= Journey to Space =

- Theatrical release poster
- Directed by: Mark Krenzien
- Written by: Mark Krenzien
- Produced by: Rick Gordon; Don Kempf; Mark Kresser; Robert Kresser; Andrew Nethery; Andy Wood
- Starring: Christian Gardner; Gabrielle Gardner; Patrick Stewart (Voice)
- Narrated by: Patrick Stewart
- Cinematography: Sean MacLeod Phillips
- Edited by: Dale Beldin
- Music by: Cody Westheimer
- Distributed by: K2 Films, Inc. and Giant Screen Films
- Release date: February 13, 2015
- Running time: 45 minutes
- Country: United States
- Languages: English; Palauan

Journey to Space (also known as Journey to Space 3D) is a 2015 American 3D documentary Adventure film directed by Mark Krenzien. It was presented in collaboration with Boeing and Toyota. It depicts an unveiling of a new era of unprecedented deep space exploration in dramatic giant screen film format. The documentary is narrated (voice) by Patrick Stewart.

== Footage ==
The documentary film features some reused and remastered in-space footage from previous IMAX films Destiny in Space, The Dream is Alive, Space Station 3D and Mission to Mir. In addition, unused archival IMAX high definition shots were used, including the astrovan approaching Space Shuttle Endeavour for STS-69 in September 1995, the launch of Challenger and Columbia on STS-8 and STS-40 in August 1984 and June 1991 respectively, landing of STS-51A, and high speed footage of the launch of STS-135 in July 2011. Remastered spectator footage of Endeavour's transport through the streets of Los Angeles is seen in 2012.

Other scenes featured computer renderings of a future SLS mission to an Ion-powered interplanetary space station and a Mars lander with an inflatable heatshield.

== Cast ==
- Christian Gardner as Tourist
- Gabrielle Gardner as Featured Tourist
- Patrick Stewart as Narrator (voice)

== Theatrical release ==
Journey to Space was released in cinemas on February 13, 2015 in USA.
