= A Beautiful Planet =

2016 film by Toni Myers

- Theatrical release poster
- Directed by: Toni Myers
- Written by: Toni Myers
- Produced by: Toni Myers
- Narrated by: Jennifer Lawrence
- Cinematography: James Neihouse
- Edited by: Toni Myers
- Music by: Micky Erbe; Maribeth Solomon
- Production companies: IMAX Entertainment; NASA
- Distributed by: IMAX Entertainment
- Release date: April 29, 2016 (United States)
- Running time: 46 minutes
- Country: United States
- Language: English
- Box office: $25.7 million

A Beautiful Planet is a 2016 IMAX Entertainment documentary produced in collaboration with NASA and filmed aboard the International Space Station by astronaut crews. Narrated by Jennifer Lawrence, it was produced and directed by Toni Myers.

The film offers distinctive views of Earth and provides insight into the day-to-day activities of the crews, captured over fifteen months aboard the space station. It also examines the impact of humans on Earth and its potential analogues in the Milky Way.

A Beautiful Planet was released in the United States on April 29, 2016 and later aired in the United Kingdom, Australia, New Zealand, and Russia/CIS.

== Overview ==
A Beautiful Planet is the first IMAX space film shot with digital cameras. It alternates between different views of Earth taken from the International Space Station and life on the station, such as exercising, transporting cargo, or following a spacewalk outside. The images are either a collection described by Lawrence with occasional comments from the astronauts, or they form part of a theme, ranging from revealing humanity’s presence on Earth at night from space to noticing the effects of the Earth’s changing climate.

The documentary features both natural and urban landscapes: capital cities illuminated by skyglow, lightning storms above clouds, Typhoon Maysak observed from its eye, polar auroras viewed from low Earth orbit, the Great Lakes of North America locked in ice and snow, and reefs below the surface of the Caribbean Sea. Images from the film capture a snow-capped segment of South America's Andes as well as some of Earth's driest and wettest areas, featuring an overhead sequence of the Namib Desert and the Atlantic Ocean's Skeleton Coast. However, the film also portrays the difference in industrialization on the Korean peninsula, with lights all over the south contrasting to the north with lights only in the capital of Pyongyang.

The documentary depicts multiple scenes of climate change and environmental degradation. Its cameras look down on deforestation in Madagascar, drought in California, the shrinking of rain forests in Brazil, and glaciers in the Himalayas. Additionally, fracking fires in southern Texas, along with other sights that highlight humanity's impact on the natural world, such as the stark borders between countries in conflict. Filmmaker Toni Myers shared with Los Angeles Times, "I wanted to inspire people, especially as to how beautiful, fragile, complex, diverse and varied the planet is... Most of all I wanted to show why we want to find solutions to look after our planet. It's our only one."

The final scenes of A Beautiful Planet briefly examine the exoplanet Kepler-186f, which was discovered in 2014. It was the first planet found to be orbiting within its star's habitable zone with a mass similar to Earth, and was the first discovery of an Earth-sized planet on which life could reside.

== Cast ==
The film's cast reflects the crew of the International Space Station. The astronauts who appeared in the movie included:

- Samantha Cristoforetti: Spent more time in an uninterrupted spaceflight than any other European astronaut.
- Scott Kelly: Spent roughly a year in space during a long, uninterrupted stay aboard the International Space Station.
- Kjell Lindgren: A medical doctor who had previously worked as a flight surgeon supporting medical operations and space-station training at NASA's Johnson Space Center.
- Anton Shkaplerov: Commander of the Soyuz spacecraft that brought Cristoforetti and Virts to the Space Station.
- Terry Virts: Commander of the 43rd expedition to the ISS from March 11, 2015 to June 11, 2015.
- Barry E. Wilmore: Commander of the 42nd expedition to the ISS from November 10, 2014 to March 11, 2015.
- Kimiya Yui: Designated as Head of the JAXA Astronaut Group after he returned from his stay on the Space Station.

== Production ==
A Beautiful Planet was written, produced, and directed by Toni Myers, who has created seven other space-themed IMAX films including Hubble 3D and Space Station 3D. Announced as a co-production between IMAX and Walt Disney Studios, the two companies jointly announced an April 29, 2016 release date on September 3, 2015. The film was premiered in Manhattan on April 16, 2016, and was released in cinemas on April 29, 2016. Despite being an initial distributor, Disney later removed association with the film prior to its release.

=== Digital IMAX cameras ===
The astronauts who filmed the movie used digital IMAX cameras, and much of the footage they produced was shot through the seven window panes on the Space Station's domed Cupola module. The use of digital cameras permitted cinematographer James Neihouse to review image sequences almost immediately and make suggestions for retakes, and was a lightweight alternative to using IMAX film which can be developed only when returned from space.

Myers and Neihouse coordinated with their astronaut camera crew to make use of the digital cameras' augmented capacity for filming in dim light. According to Myers, "We would not have the nighttime scenes without the digital dynamic range ... What the digital capture did, totally open up that night world to us, with stars, cities at night, lightning and other phenomena that you see at night, like auroras."

=== Computer-generated spaceflight scenes ===
A Beautiful Planet starts and ends with two computer-generated "trips" past stars in the Earth's region of the Milky Way Galaxy. Both scenes are based on astronomical catalog data and actual telescopic observations, and both were created by the National Center for Supercomputing Applications at the University of Illinois Urbana-Champaign. The film's first scene begins with a viewpoint “below” the plane of the Milky Way, continuing past neighboring stars and ending at the Sun, and one of the movie’s final scene begin with facing the Space Station and ends at the Earth-like planet Kepler-186f, 500 light years away.

== Reception ==
On the review aggregator website Rotten Tomatoes, 100% of 13 critics' reviews are positive.

Writing for The Guardian, Mike McCahill called it a "large-format eye-opener [which] achieves a breathtaking new perspective on Earthly life," while another appraisal in The New York Times, Ken Jaworowski asked, "how can your eyes not bug out when given 3-D views of Earth, taken from space, on a stories-high [IMAX] screen?"

== See also ==
- List of films featuring space stations
