= Destiny in Space =

- Theatrical release poster
- Directed by: Ben Burtt; Phyllis Ferguson; James Neihouse; Gail Singer
- Written by: Toni Myers
- Produced by: Graeme Ferguson
- Starring: Roberta Bondar; Eric DeJong; Ronald Grabe; David Hilmers; Ulf Merbold; Stephen Oswald; William Readdy; Lyman Spitzer; Norman Thagard
- Narrated by: Leonard Nimoy
- Cinematography: David Douglas; James Neihouse
- Edited by: Toni Myers
- Music by: Micky Erbe; Maribeth Solomon
- Distributed by: IMAX Corporation
- Release date: 1994
- Running time: 40 minutes
- Countries: United States; Canada
- Language: English

Destiny in Space is a 70mm IMAX documentary film released in 1994. The film was written by Toni Myers, directed by Academy Award-winner Ben Burtt, and narrated by Leonard Nimoy.

The film is a showcase of the daily lives of astronauts in space, particularly on the STS-42 Space Shuttle Discovery Spacelab mission, as they fix instruments and take measurements. The film includes two Space Shuttle launches and several cargo bay scenes, including an astronaut repairing the Hubble Space Telescope. CGI recreations of the surface of Venus and Mars based on satellite data from JPL are also featured. The film looks at the future of human space exploration and what future generations might accomplish in the years to come.

Four filmmakers contributed to directing the film. Director/cinematographer James Neihouse was the cinematographer for Blue Planet, The Dream Is Alive (a 1985 documentary about the Space Shuttle program), Michael Jordan to the Max and other IMAX features. Burtt, aside from his lengthy and impressive list of sound crew credits, directed both Destiny and Blue Planet. Toni Myers edited several IMAX pictures, including L5: First City in Space, Hail Columbia (a 1982 documentary focusing on the first mission of Space Shuttle Columbia), and others.

Several scenes included launch and in-orbit footage from shuttle missions STS-41-C, STS-61-B, STS-31, STS-32, STS-34, STS-40, STS-42, STS-46, STS-51 and STS-61.

== DVD ==
Destiny In Space is presented in 1.33:1 full frame and contains a Dolby Digital 5.1 presentation. A nine-minute making-of featurette is included in the extras, with the theatrical trailer and general IMAX trailer.
