= Hubble (film) =

Hubble 3D
- Theatrical release poster
- Directed by: Toni Myers
- Written by: Toni Myers; Frank Summers; Graeme Ferguson
- Produced by: Toni Myers; Graeme Ferguson
- Narrated by: Leonardo DiCaprio
- Cinematography: James Neihouse
- Edited by: Toni Myers
- Music by: Micky Erbe; Maribeth Solomon
- Production companies: NASA; IMAX Filmed Entertainment
- Distributed by: Warner Bros. Pictures
- Release date: March 19, 2010 (United States)
- Running time: 43 minutes
- Country: United States
- Language: English
- Box office: $73.6 million

Hubble (also known as Hubble 3D, IMAX: Hubble, or IMAX: Hubble 3D) is a 2010 American documentary film about Space Shuttle missions to repair and upgrade the Hubble Space Telescope. It is narrated by the actor Leonardo DiCaprio.

== Content ==
Hubble 3D is an IMAX and Warner Bros. Pictures production, in cooperation with the National Aeronautics and Space Administration (NASA). The film reunites the 2002 documentary Space Station 3D film making team, led by producer/director Toni Myers. Hubble 3D opened at IMAX and IMAX 3D theaters on March 19, 2010.

The film takes the viewer past Saturn's aurora, the Helix Nebula in the constellation of Aquarius, the Pillars of Creation in the Eagle Nebula, the Andromeda Galaxy, and the Butterfly Nebula. The Hubble Space Telescope has provided data and imagery so detailed that scientists and film technicians have been able to put viewers "inside" the images during two extended CGI fly-throughs. In one sequence, gaseous clouds billow while million-mile-an-hour stellar winds blow through a cloud canyon in the Orion Nebula some 90 trillion miles across. These data-driven animations were created by the Office of Public Outreach at the Space Telescope Science Institute and the Advanced Visualization Laboratory at the National Center for Supercomputing Applications.

== Filming ==
Footage seen within the movie was compiled from multiple sources, including IMAX cameras taken into space on Hubble Space Telescope Servicing Missions by the Space Shuttle. This allowed the camera to shoot footage of the satellite close-up and during maintenance. IMAX cameras were taken to the Hubble Space Telescope on STS-61 (Servicing Mission 1 in December 1993) and on STS-125 (Servicing Mission 4 in May 2009, the final Space Shuttle mission to the Hubble) which carried an IMAX 3D camera. The IMAX 3D camera contained a mile of film, though this allowed for only 8 minutes 30 seconds of footage to be recorded.

== Critical reception ==
The film has received positive reviews. Review aggregator Rotten Tomatoes reports that 86% of critics have given the film a positive review, based on 37 reviews, giving the film a positive review. The site's consensus reads "Offering a stunning, expansive viewing experience, Hubble 3D takes advantage of IMAX and 3-D technology like no other film." Review aggregation website Metacritic reports a score of 79 out of 100 from 13 critical reviews, indicating 'generally favorable reviews.'

New York Times critic Neil Genzlinger largely concurred, but added "... such ponderous, cliché-heavy narration. Leonardo DiCaprio delivers it, which might lead you to expect something moderately hip; instead it’s that same old leaden drone, which back when space flight was new perhaps conveyed suitable awe but these days just makes you feel as if you’re in a junior-high civics class."
