= Blue Planet (1990 film) =

- Directed by: Ben Burtt
- Written by: Toni Myers
- Narrated by: Toni Myers
- Cinematography: David Douglas; James Neihouse
- Edited by: Toni Myers
- Music by: Micky Erbe; Maribeth Solomon
- Release date: 1990
- Running time: 40 minutes
- Country: United States
- Language: English
- Box office: $22.8 million (US/Canada)

Blue Planet is a 1990 IMAX film directed by Ben Burtt, and produced by the IMAX Space Technology corporation for the Smithsonian Institution's National Air and Space Museum, as well as Lockheed Corporation. Filmed with the cooperation of the NASA, it was written, edited, and narrated by Toni Myers.

Partially filmed from orbit during Space Shuttle missions, the film is about the planet Earth. The changes and constants are highlighted, and the film attempts to show how fragile and unique Earth is. Origins of the planet, how it has changed, what man's role in change is, and other issues are discussed. The film features footage that was filmed from space, underwater, computer animations based on satellite data, and a variety of views from the surface to illustrate the topics.

== Summary ==
Blue Planet opens showing how the Apollo 11 Moon landing gives humanity a first whole and contemplative view of Earth. It then follows the Mission to Planet Earth (MTPE), a 1989 flight using Space Shuttle Discovery mission STS-29, intended to understand more about climate change.

The film first observes how living things depend on nature to thrive: for example, the unique anatomy of Lake Natron formed the lands of the Serengeti, cradle of a variety of animals. Only humans evolved and produced a global society, but they still need oxygen to thrive. Orbiters and spacesuits use a set of mechanisms to biomimick Earth's life support system. Rain helps plants grow, making rainforests a big source of oxygen. Some places, however, have different climates, and thus different types of nature, some fiercer than others. The film depicts Hurricane Hugo, Hurricane Jerry, the 1989 Sakurajima eruption, and the 1989 Loma Prieta earthquake as examples. However despite these onslaughts, humans learn to live in harmony while peace remains.

However as humanity evolves, climate change worsens, making humans themselves a force of nature, one more lethal. Water bodies, oxygen, and rainforests—notably the Amazon rainforest—have been greatly polluted by human activities like pouring harmful materials, mass-producing cars, and burning. Light pollution is also concerned. The output of carbon dioxide and carbon monoxide into the air shrunk the size of the ozone, vital to protecting Earth from the Sun's ultraviolet. Because of these damages, the idea of worldwide restriction or ban the act of pollution have been popular. Astronaut James Buchli highlights the need for this decision through an existential reflection. The film ends by saying that Earth is the only home for humans and their descendants, urging all countries to unite and make their home a better place.

=== The Dream is Alive ===
A second feature is included on the Blu-ray release. The Dream is Alive documentary was also filmed in IMAX, and originally released in 1985. The documentary topics are the Space Shuttle program and the concept of space exploration in general.

== See also ==
- Cosmic Voyage - Documentary film also commissioned by the Smithsonian Institution
