= Mission to Mir =

- Theatrical release poster
- Directed by: Ivan Galin
- Produced by: Toni Myers; Graeme Ferguson
- Cinematography: James Neihouse
- Music by: Micky Erbe; Maribeth Solomon
- Production company: IMAX Filmed Entertainment
- Release date: October 17, 1997 (United States)
- Running time: 40 minutes
- Country: United States
- Language: English

Mission to Mir is a 1997 documentary film about the Mir Space Station.

== Filming ==
Footage seen within the movie was compiled from multiple sources. These include IMAX cameras taken into space on the Space Shuttle. IMAX cameras were taken to the Mir Space Station on Space Shuttle missions: STS-63, STS-71, STS-74 and STS-79. The main subject of the film were Mir missions: Mir EO-18, Mir EO-19, Mir EO-20, Mir EO-21 and Mir EO-22.

== Narration ==
American Space Shuttle astronaut Shannon Lucid is the dominant figure in this documentary. Her delayed return to Earth by about six weeks brought her total time in near-Earth orbit to 188 days. She talks about working, sleeping, eating, exercising and relaxing in space. She also articulates her philosophy of dealing with any and all difficulties one day at a time and always cultivating a healthy sense of humor.

== See also ==
- Shuttle–Mir Program
- List of films featuring space stations
