= Ben Burtt =

American sound designer (born 1948)

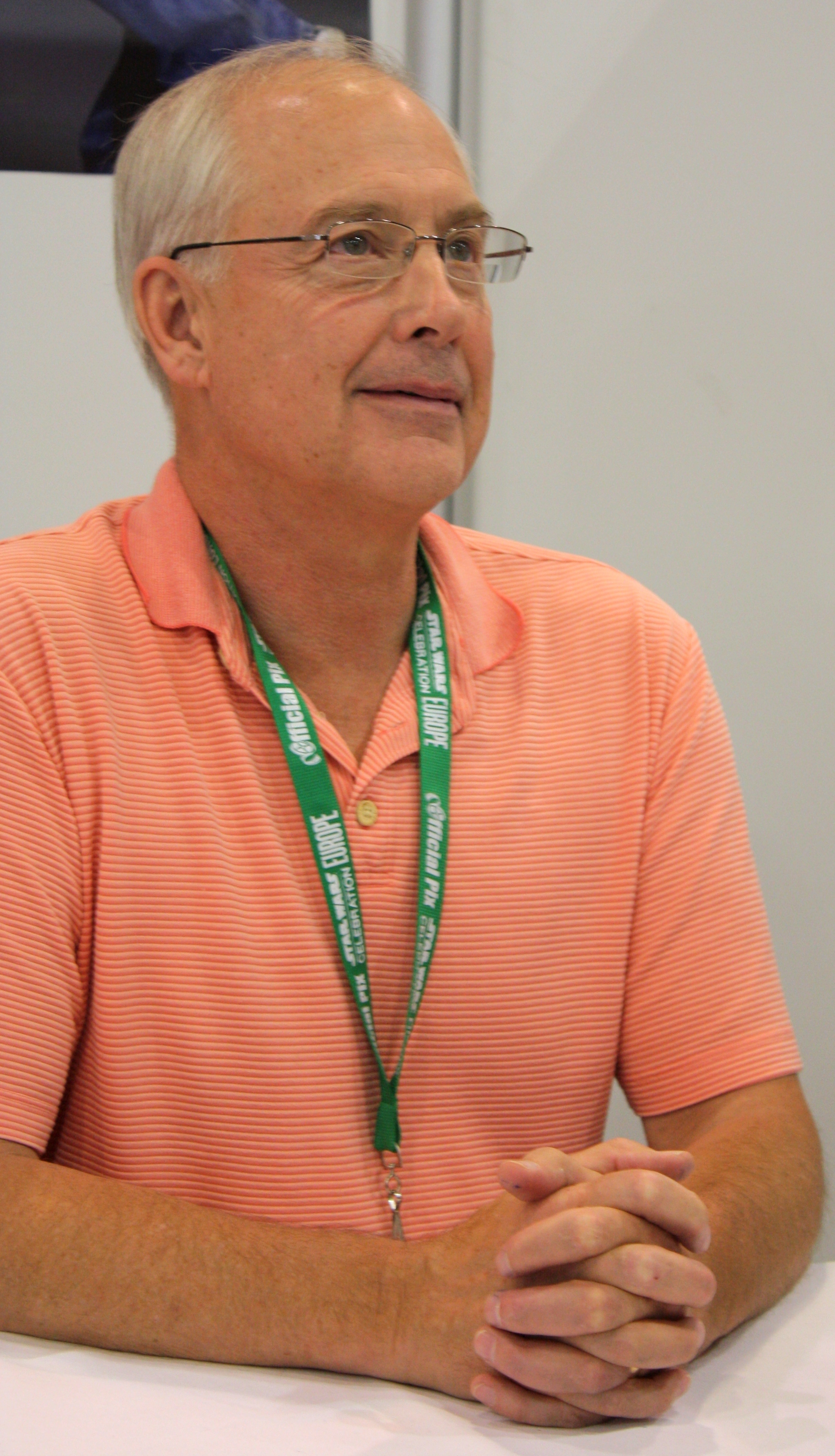
- Burtt at Star Wars Celebration Europe II in Essen, Germany in 2013
- Born: Benjamin Burtt Jr. July 12, 1948 (age 78); Jamesville, New York, U.S.
- Education: Allegheny College; University of Southern California
- Occupations: Sound designer; film director; film editor; screenwriter; voice actor
- Years active: 1975–present
- Children: Benjamin A. Burtt
- Awards: Doctor of Arts; Charles S. Swartz Award; Academy Award

Benjamin Burtt Jr. (born July 12, 1948) is an American sound designer, film director, film editor, screenwriter, and voice actor. As a sound designer, his credits include the Star Wars and Indiana Jones film series, Invasion of the Body Snatchers (1978), E.T. the Extra-Terrestrial (1982), WALL-E (2008), and Star Trek (2009).

Burtt is notable for popularizing the Wilhelm scream in-joke and creating many of the iconic sound effects heard in the Star Wars film franchise, including the 'voice' of R2-D2, the lightsaber hum, the sound of the blaster guns, the heavy-breathing sound of Darth Vader, and creating the Ewoks’ language, Ewokese. Burtt was also the sound editor for the Pixar film WALL-E and performed the vocalizations of the character of WALL-E as well as other robots in the film.

Burtt has won four Academy Awards, two of which are Special Achievement Academy Awards. He has also directed numerous documentary films for IMAX and most notably the television series Young Indiana Jones on the episode "Attack of the Hawkmen." He also served as the editor on multiple episodes of the show and the Star Wars prequel trilogy.

== Early life ==
Burtt was born in Jamesville, New York, on July 12, 1948. The son of a chemistry professor at Syracuse University and a child psychologist, Burtt made films as a child, and later studied physics at Allegheny College, Pennsylvania, graduating in 1970.

== Career ==
=== Early career ===
Burtt made films during his time in college, and in 1970 won a National Student Film Festival for his war film entitled Yankee Squadron, reputedly after following exposure to classic aviation drama. He had previously made an amateur film at the Old Rhinebeck Aerodrome, a living aviation museum in Red Hook, New York, under guidance from its founder, Cole Palen.

For his work on the special-effects film Genesis, Burtt won a scholarship to the University of Southern California, where he earned a master's degree in film production.

=== Sound designer ===
Burtt pioneered many aspects of modern sound design, especially in the science-fiction and fantasy-film genres. Before his work in the first Star Wars (now known as Star Wars Episode IV: A New Hope) in 1977, science-fiction films tended to use electronic-sounding effects for futuristic devices. Burtt sought a more natural sound, blending in "found sounds" to create the effects. The lightsaber hum, for instance, was derived from a film projector idling combined with feedback from a broken television set, and the blaster effect started with the sound acquired from hitting a guy-wire on a radio tower with a hammer.

In the Star Wars series, part of R2-D2's beeps and whistles are Burtt's vocalizations, also made using an ARP 2600 synthesizer, as are some of the squawks made by the tiny holographic monsters on the Millennium Falcon spacecraft. In Star Wars: Episode III – Revenge of the Sith (2005), Burtt's provided the voice for Lushros Dofine, captain of the Invisible Hand cruiser. The heavy breathing of Darth Vader was created by recording Burtt's own breathing in an old Dacor scuba regulator.

Burtt used the voice of an elderly lady that he had met in a photography shop for the voice of E.T. the Extra-Terrestrial. The woman's low pitch was the result of very heavy smoking, specifically Kool cigarettes. Burtt created the "voice" of the title character and many other robots in Pixar's film WALL-E (2008), about a lonely garbage-compacting robot. Additionally, Burtt is responsible for the sound effects in Indiana Jones and the Kingdom of the Crystal Skull (2008).

Burtt has a reputation for including a sound effect dubbed "the Wilhelm scream" in many of the movies he has worked on. Taken from a character named "Wilhelm" in the film The Charge at Feather River, the sound can be heard in a large number of films, including in Star Wars Episode IV: A New Hope when a stormtrooper falls into a chasm and in Raiders of the Lost Ark when a Nazi soldier falls off the back of a moving car.

One of Burtt's more subtle sound effects is the "audio black hole". In Attack of the Clones, Burtt's use of the audio black hole involved the insertion of a short interval of absolute silence in the audio track, just prior to the detonation of "seismic charges" fired at the escaping Jedi spaceship. The effect of this short (less than one second) of silence is to accentuate the resulting explosion in the mind of the listener. Burtt has recalled the source of this idea as follows: "I think back to where that idea might have come to me...I remember in film school a talk I had with an old retired sound editor who said they used to leave a few frames of silence in the track just before a big explosion. In those days they would 'paint' out the optical sound with ink. Then I thought of the airlock entry sequence in 2001. I guess the seeds were there for me to nourish when it came to the seismic charges."

Burtt was among the golden ears that critically reviewed the various audio compression systems that were proposed for the ATSC 1.0 digital television system.

A tongue-in-cheek homage to Burtt appears in the 1997 Activision PC game Zork: Grand Inquisitor - the spell 'Beburtt', which 'creates the illusion of inclement weather', plays dramatic thunderclap and rainfall sounds when cast.

=== Director, editor, and writer ===
Burtt has directed several IMAX documentary films, including Blue Planet, Destiny in Space, and the Oscar-nominated Special Effects: Anything Can Happen. He edited the entire Star Wars prequel trilogy, and several episodes of The Young Indiana Jones Chronicles. Burtt also wrote several episodes of the 1980s Star Wars cartoon Droids.

=== Cameo appearances ===
Burtt makes a cameo appearance in two of the Star Wars films as an extra. In Return of the Jedi, he appeared as Colonel Dyer, the Imperial officer who yells "Freeze!" before Han Solo knocks him off a balcony. The scream as Burtt falls is his own imitation of the Wilhelm scream that he popularized. In Episode I – The Phantom Menace, Burtt appears in the background of the scene where Palpatine arrives on Naboo; his character is named Ebenn Q3 Baobab, a reference to a Droids character.

== Filmography ==
=== Film ===
Title	Year	Credited as					Notes
Title	Year	Director	Writer	Editor	Sound designer	Other	Notes
Death Race 2000	1975				Yes		Uncredited
The Milpitas Monster	1976					Yes	Special effects artist
Star Wars	1977				Yes	Yes	1997 & 2004 versions Special dialogue and sound effects
Invasion of the Body Snatchers	1978					Yes	Special sound effects creator
More American Graffiti	1979				Yes	Yes	Supervising sound editor
The Empire Strikes Back	1980				Yes	Yes	1997 & 2004 versions Supervising sound editor
Raiders of the Lost Ark	1981				Yes		
E.T. the Extra-Terrestrial	1982					Yes	E.T. voice designer
The Dark Crystal	1982					Yes	Special sound effects creator
Return of the Jedi	1983				Yes		Appeared as Commander Dyer and voice of Tortured Power Droid
Indiana Jones and the Temple of Doom	1984				Yes	Yes	
The Adventures of André and Wally B.	1984				Yes		Short film
The Dream Is Alive	1985					Yes	Short film Supervising sound designer
Howard the Duck	1986					Yes	Sound effects editor
Nutcracker: The Motion Picture	1986				Yes		
Niagara: Miracles, Myths and Magic	1986		Yes	Yes	Yes		Short film
Willow	1988				Yes		
Indiana Jones and the Last Crusade	1989				Yes		
Always	1989				Yes		
Blue Planet	1990	Yes			Yes		
The True Story of Glory Continues	1990	Yes		Yes	Yes		
The American Gangster	1992	Yes					
Destiny in Space	1994	Yes					Co-director
Special Effects: Anything Can Happen	1996	Yes	Yes	Yes			
Star Wars: Episode I – The Phantom Menace	1999			Yes	Yes	Yes	Supervising sound editor Appeared as Naboo Courier
Star Wars: Episode II – Attack of the Clones	2002			Yes	Yes	Yes	Supervising sound editor
Star Wars: Episode III – Revenge of the Sith	2005			Yes	Yes	Yes	Supervising sound editor Provided voice for Lushros Dofine
Munich	2005				Yes	Yes	Supervising sound editor
Indiana Jones and the Kingdom of the Crystal Skull	2008				Yes	Yes	Supervising sound editor
WALL-E	2008				Yes	Yes	Provided voice for WALL-E / M-O / Robots; Supervising sound editor
BURN-E	2008				Yes	Yes	Short film Provided voice for WALL-E
Up	2009					Yes	Uncredited; Special sound effects recordist
Star Trek	2009				Yes	Yes	Sound editor
Super 8	2011				Yes	Yes	Supervising sound editor
Red Tails	2012			Yes	Yes	Yes	Supervising sound editor
John Carter	2012					Yes	Sound consultation
Lincoln	2012				Yes		
Star Trek Into Darkness	2013				Yes	Yes	Supervising sound editor
Escape from Planet Earth	2013					Yes	Additional sound design
The Signal	2014				Yes		
Star Wars: The Force Awakens	2015				Yes		
Making Waves: The Art of Cinematic Sound	2019					Yes	As himself
Ray Gunn	2026				Yes		

=== Television ===
Title	Year	Credited as					Notes
Title	Year	Director	Writer	Editor	Sound designer	Other	Notes
Star Wars Holiday Special	1978				Yes		Television film
Star Wars: Droids	1985–1986		Yes		Yes	Yes	Associate producer Story editor Stories for 4 episodes Teleplay for episode "The Great Heep"
Chip 'n Dale: Rescue Rangers	1988–1990					Yes	Uncredited; Sound effects editor (65 episodes)
The Young Indiana Jones Chronicles	1992–1996	Yes	Yes	Yes	Yes	Yes	Second unit director (2 episodes); Directed and teleplay episode "Attack of the Hawkmen"
Star Wars: Forces of Destiny	2017–2018				Yes		

=== Video games ===
- WALL-E (2008) - WALL•E / M-O / Robots
- Lego The Incredibles (2018) - WALL•E
- Star Wars Jedi: Fallen Order (2019) - BD-1
- Disney Dreamlight Valley (2023) - WALL•E
- Disney Speedstorm (2023) - WALL•E

== Awards ==
=== Academy Awards ===
- Best Sound Effects Editing in 1989 for Indiana Jones and the Last Crusade
- Best Sound Effects Editing in 1982 for E.T. the Extra-Terrestrial
- Special Achievement for Sound Effects Editing in Raiders of the Lost Ark (1981)
- Special Achievement for the creation of the alien, creature and robot voices in Star Wars (1977)
- Nominated for:
  - Best Sound Mixing and Best Sound Editing in 2008 for WALL-E
  - Best Sound Effects Editing in 1999 for Star Wars: Episode I – The Phantom Menace
  - Best Documentary Short Subject in 1996 for directing Special Effects: Anything Can Happen
  - Best Sound in 1989 for Indiana Jones and the Last Crusade
  - Best Sound Effects Editing in 1988 for Willow
  - Best Sound and Best Sound Effects Editing in 1983 for Return of the Jedi

=== Annie Awards ===
- Nominated: Voice Acting in a Feature Production in 2008 for WALL-E

=== Honorary awards ===
Burtt was awarded the Doctor of Arts, honoris causa, by Allegheny College on May 9, 2004.

The Hollywood Post Alliance awarded him with The Charles S. Swartz Award for outstanding contributions to the field of post production.

In 2024, Burtt was recognized with the Vision Award Ticinomoda at the 77th Locarno Film Festival.
