= Toni Myers =

Canadian director and filmmaker (1943–2019)

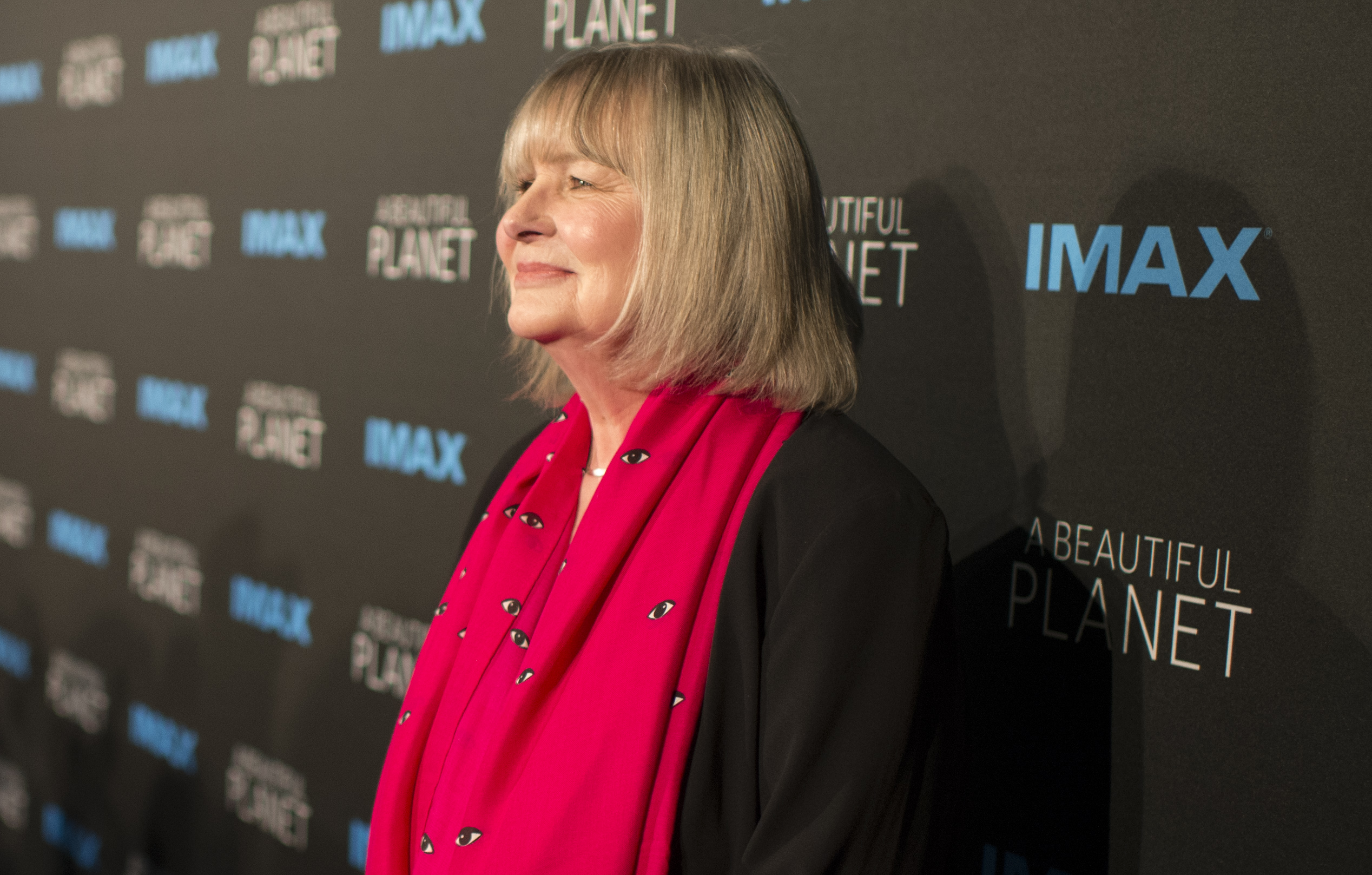
Toni Myers during the world premiere of the film "A Beautiful Planet"

Toni Myers (29 September 1943 – 18 February 2019) was a Canadian film editor, writer, director, and producer, best known for her 3D IMAX work. Her most recent film was 2016's A Beautiful Planet.

== Selected filmography ==
- Blue Planet (1990) (writer, editor, and narrator)
- Destiny in Space (1994) (writer)
- Mission to Mir (1997) (producer)
- Space Station 3D (2002) (writer, producer, editor, and director)
- Under the Sea (2009) (producer, writer)
- Hubble (2010) (writer, producer, editor, and director)
- A Beautiful Planet (2016) (writer, producer, and director)
