= The American Gangster =

- VHS cover
- Directed by: Ben Burtt
- Written by: Ray Herbeck Jr.
- Produced by: Ray Herbeck Jr.
- Narrated by: Dennis Farina
- Music by: Marco D'Ambrosio
- Distributed by: Sony Pictures Home Entertainment
- Release date: July 1, 1992
- Running time: 45 minutes
- Country: United States
- Language: English

The American Gangster is a 1992 American crime documentary film directed by Ben Burtt and written and produced by Ray Herbeck Jr. The documentary is narrated by Dennis Farina and explores the lives of America's gangsters such as Pretty Boy Floyd, John Dillinger, Al Capone, and Bugsy Siegel. It was directly released on VHS in 1992 and later released as part of a DVD box set in 2006.

== Background ==
The American Gangster is a documentary that chronicles the formation of the first generation of American gangsters. The documentary explores the illegal businesses involving gambling, prostitution, and defiance of the prohibition of alcohol that empowered the gangsters. The documentary shows actual film footage and photographs of gangsters like Pretty Boy Floyd, John Dillinger, Al Capone, and Bugsy Siegel.

== Release ==
The American Gangster was released on VHS on July 1, 1992. The documentary was later part of a box set of DVDs, The Mob Box Set, released on January 3, 2006. The documentary accompanied films like Bugsy (1991), Donnie Brasco (1997), and Snatch (2000).
