= Special Effects: Anything Can Happen =

- Directed by: Ben Burtt
- Written by: Susanne Simpson; Ben Burtt; Tom Friedman
- Produced by: Susanne Simpson; Ben Stassen
- Narrated by: John Lithgow
- Cinematography: Pepi Lenzi; Tak Fujimoto
- Edited by: Ben Burtt
- Music by: Christopher L. Stone
- Production company: NOVA Giant Screen Films
- Distributed by: IMAX Corporation
- Release date: July 4, 1996
- Running time: 40 minutes
- Country: United States
- Language: English

Special Effects: Anything Can Happen is an American documentary film directed by Academy Award-winning sound designer Ben Burtt and narrated by John Lithgow. It was released to IMAX theaters in 1996. A making of documentary for the King Kong segment entitled Behind the Scenes with King Kong in Special Effects was released on VHS to promote the film.

== Overview ==
This documentary film is an exploration of special effects techniques used in motion pictures, including traditional special effects up to modern computer-generated effects. It is also notable for featuring the making of the new digital effects created for the Special Edition version of Star Wars: Episode IV – A New Hope, which was released theatrically one year later, in 1997.

== Accolades ==
The film was nominated for an Academy Award for Best Documentary Short Subject, losing to Breathing Lessons.
