= Graeme Ferguson (filmmaker) =

Canadian filmmaker and inventor (1929–2021)

- Born: October 7, 1929; Toronto, Ontario, Canada
- Died: May 8, 2021 (aged 91); Norway Point, Ontario, Canada
- Education: University of Toronto
- Occupations: Filmmaker; executive
- Known for: Co-inventing IMAX
- Spouses: Betty Ferguson (divorced) Phyllis Wilson (m. 1982; died 2021)
- Children: 2

Ivan Graeme Ferguson CM (October 7, 1929 – May 8, 2021) was a Canadian filmmaker and inventor who co-invented the IMAX film format. He was appointed to the Order of Canada in 1992.

== Early life ==
Ferguson was born Toronto on October 7, 1929. He studied political science and economics at Victoria College, University of Toronto, from 1948 to 1952. He served as cameraman for the university's film society, and was consequently chosen for a apprenticeship program at the National Film Board of Canada during the summer of 1950. He was elected as one of the representatives of his college to the Students’ Administrative Council. After graduation, he was chosen as national secretary of the World University Service.

== Career ==
Ferguson relocated to New York during the late 1950s, and worked as a freelance filmmaker for the next decade. He worked on the television series Silents Please, as well as on the short film Rooftops of New York that was ultimately nominated for the Academy Award for Best Live Action Short Film. He subsequently worked with his high school friends Robert Kerr and William Shaw, along with Roman Kroitor, on the experimental 18-minute-long film Polar Life. It was shown at Expo 67 in Montreal and involved using 11 screens and projectors, with the audience situated on a central rotating turntable. The movie was received favourably, leading the four of them to establish the IMAX Corporation in 1967. They eventually replicated the initial experience, but with a single large screen and projector. This new system was launched at the world's fair three years later in Osaka to premiere the film Tiger Child.

Ferguson produced, directed and shot North of Superior in 1971, one of the first official IMAX films, which is still shown on IMAX screens. He played a key role in bringing IMAX cameras into space. One of the documentaries he produced, The Dream Is Alive (1985), was attributed by Susan Helms as having galvanized her to become an astronaut. She went on to feature in another documentary produced by Ferguson, Space Station 3D (2002).

Ferguson served as president of IMAX for two decades until 1990. The company was subsequently sold four years later and became a public corporation. He was still making films into the 2010s, with an executive producer credit on Hubble 3D (2010) and A Beautiful Planet (2016).

== Awards and honors ==
Ferguson was honoured with a Special Achievement Genie in 1983. He was appointed a member of the Order of Canada in October 1992 and invested in April of the following year. He was granted an honorary doctorate from the University of Bradford in 1994. Eleven years later, Ferguson was conferred the Kodak Vision Award by the Large Format Cinema Association. He received the first outstanding achievement award from the Giant Screen Cinema Association in 2016.

== Personal life ==
Ferguson married his first wife, Betty, in 1959. They met while filming in Alaska and relocated to New York after getting married. Together, they had two children: Munro and Allison. After their divorce, Graeme and Betty were involved in a landmark 1983 lawsuit brought by the latter, who had been part of the founding team of IMAX. The claim alleged a series of oppressive acts by Ferguson and his colleagues, including a resolution to discharge her from the company and being pressured to sell back her shares. Brooke JA, writing for the Ontario Court of Appeal, found that the acts were "oppressive and unfairly prejudicial", and the resolution was barred. The court established that majority shareholders owe a duty of fairness to minority shareholders. Their son, Munro, remembered how it was "quite a painful period", but noted how Ferguson kept at a distance from the case.

Ferguson married his second wife, Phyllis Wilson, in 1982. They met while he was directing and serving as cinematographer of North of Superior. She was of the Algonquins of Pikwàkanagàn First Nation, and assisted him in becoming familiar with the land and engaging with the locals. They were in a common-law relationship for ten years before marrying, and remained married until her death in March 2021.

Ferguson died on May 8, 2021, at his home in Norway Point, Ontario. He was 91, and had been diagnosed with throat cancer one year prior to his death. His wife, Phyllis, died of a heart attack eight weeks earlier.
