= Maribeth Solomon =

Canadian film and television composer and songwriter

Maribeth Solomon (born June 23, 1950) is a Canadian film and television composer and songwriter. She has been nominated for the Genie Award, the Emmy Award, the Gemini Award and the International Film Music Critics Association Award for her work.

Most of her composing work was done as a duo with her husband, Micky Erbe. They were always nominated together as composers of film or television scores, although Solomon also received two nominations on her own as a songwriter. Solomon and Erbe were partners in their own firm, Mickymar Productions, until Erbe's death in 2021.

Born in Toronto, Ontario, Solomon is the daughter of former Toronto Symphony Orchestra violinist Stanley Solomon, and the sister of jazz and pop musician Lenny Solomon. Solomon and Erbe both contributed to the debut album by Lenny Solomon's 1970s band Myles and Lenny, and Solomon's song "Falling into Rhyme" was recorded by Anne Murray on her 1972 album Annie.

Solomon's composing credits include the films Harry Tracy, Desperado, Improper Channels, Hubble, Space Station 3D, Ticket to Heaven, Shattered Trust: The Shari Karney Story, Blackjack, Threshold, Deadly Love, Destiny in Space, Picture Perfect, Utilities, Mission to Mir, The Dream is Alive and Blue Planet, and the television series It's Our Stuff, Nothing Too Good for a Cowboy, Side Effects, Earth: Final Conflict, Street Legal, E.N.G., and Schitt's Creek.

Solomon has also composed for video games, most notably for independent outfit Failbetter Games' Sunless Sea and Sunless Skies.

== Awards and nominations ==
=== Genies ===
- 3rd Genie Awards, 1982 - Best Original Score, Ticket to Heaven
- 4th Genie Awards, 1983 - Best Original Score, Threshold
- 9th Genie Awards, 1988 - Best Original Song, "Rise and Shine" (The Care Bears Adventure in Wonderland)
- 10th Genie Awards, 1989 - Best Original Score, Milk and Honey
- 11th Genie Awards, 1990 - Best Original Song, "The Best We Both Can Be" and "Elephant March" (Babar: The Movie)

=== Geminis ===
- 1988 Gemini Awards - Best Music Composition for a Series (Dramatic Underscore), Adderly (won) and Mount Royal
- 1989 Gemini Awards - Best Music Composition for a Series, The Struggle for Democracy (won)
- 1993 Gemini Awards - Best Original Music Score for a Series, Street Legal (won)
- 1995 Gemini Awards - Best Original Music Score for a Series, E.N.G.
- 1996 Gemini Awards - Best Original Music Score for a Program or Mini-Series, Street Legal: The Last Rights
- 1998 Gemini Awards - Best Original Music Score for a Dramatic Series, Earth: Final Conflict, episode "The Secret of Strandhill" (won)
- 2000 Gemini Awards - Best Original Music Score for a Dramatic Series, Earth: Final Conflict

=== Emmys ===
- 50th Primetime Emmy Awards, 1998 - Outstanding Main Title Theme Music, Earth: Final Conflict

=== IMFCA ===
- International Film Music Critics Association Awards, 2009 - Best Original Score for a Documentary Feature Film, Under the Sea 3D
