= The Dream Is Alive =

- DVD cover
- Directed by: Graeme Ferguson
- Written by: Toni Trow Myers
- Produced by: Graeme Ferguson
- Starring: David Leestma; Jon A. McBride; George Nelson; Sally Ride; Kathryn Dwyer Sullivan; James Van Hoften
- Narrated by: Walter Cronkite
- Edited by: Toni Trow Myers
- Music by: Micky Erbe; Maribeth Solomon
- Production company: Threshold Corporation
- Distributed by: IMAX Systems Corporation
- Release date: June 1, 1985
- Running time: 37 minutes
- Country: United States
- Language: English
- Box office: $70 million

The Dream is Alive is an American IMAX documentary film, released on June 1, 1985, about NASA's Space Shuttle program. The film was narrated by Walter Cronkite, and directed by Graeme Ferguson.

== Synopsis ==
The documentary includes scenes from numerous shuttle missions, beginning with the dawn landing of Discovery at Kennedy Space Center's Shuttle Landing Facility upon the conclusion of STS-51-A. A composite shot, the finished sequence is composed of footage from Discovery's landing, radio transmissions from Challenger's 1984 landing on STS-41-B (the first mission to use the SLF runway), and runway approach footage filmed from a fixed-wing aircraft.

Mission STS-41-C, the 11th for the Shuttle program and the fifth for Challenger is featured most heavily, beginning with the deployment of the Long Duration Exposure Facility (LDEF) satellite. The capture and repair of the Solar Max satellite also receives a great deal of coverage, including a detailed overview of training for the mission in a large pool at NASA. This particular mission is of interest, as the first attempt at capturing the satellite failed, and a second attempt almost 12 hours later had to be made. That portion of the mission was a success, with the satellite being brought to the payload bay on the next attempt, and was repaired quickly by astronauts James van Hoften and George Nelson. Other STS 41-C mission activities included a student experiment located in a middeck locker to determine how honeybees make honeycomb cells in a microgravity environment.

Other shuttle missions are interspersed during the feature with the STS-41-C footage. Highlights include:

- STS-41-D: The first launch of Discovery, with footage of liftoff, the deployment of two of the three satellites on this mission, and special attention given to the novelty of the experimental OAST-1 solar array, which was a precursor to the solar arrays of the International Space Station. (These arrays were also a highly publicized portion of shuttle mission STS-116, during which the astronauts made multiple—and eventually successful—attempts to fold the arrays for movement around the station.) Footage is also shown of Discovery's landing and transport from its landing site at Edwards Air Force Base to Kennedy Space Center on the back of the Shuttle Carrier Aircraft.
- STS-41-G: The sixth flight of Challenger, notable as the largest crew aboard the Shuttle at that time, the first time two women flew together on the Shuttle, and the first spacewalk by an American woman, Kathryn Dwyer Sullivan. Footage of Hurricane Josephine is also shown.

Additionally, a small amount of time is also dedicated to other aspects of the Space Shuttle program, including:

- Other crew that work on the Shuttle;
- The work of inspecting and replacing the Shuttle's heat tiles;
- Training the astronauts must complete to prepare for missions;
- What the astronauts eat on spaceflights;
- How astronauts would bail out if an emergency occurred on the launch pad.

== Challenger disaster ==
The film was produced and shot 15–18 months before the January 28, 1986, Challenger disaster, and includes appearances by two astronauts who died in the explosion; Francis Scobee and Judith Resnik. Challenger itself is featured prominently in the film. Many of the themes and tone of the documentary regarded the normalization of travel to space using the Shuttle while giving only passing mention to the dangers. The Challenger disaster would dramatically curtail this belief and subsequent experience would show that the shuttle would not make space travel more accessible or affordable.

== Release ==
By 1992, Variety reported that the film had grossed $70 million since its debut translating to $17 million in film rentals in the United States and Canada, the biggest IMAX 70mm film to that date.

The Dream Is Alive was released on LaserDisc three times (twice in the US, once in Japan), DVD (pictured), and in high definition as a bonus feature on the Blue Planet HD DVD and Blu-ray in 2007.
