= Space Station 3D =

- Theatrical release poster
- Directed by: Toni Myers
- Written by: Toni Myers
- Produced by: Toni Myers
- Narrated by: Tom Cruise
- Cinematography: James Neihouse
- Edited by: Toni Myers
- Music by: Micky Erbe; Maribeth Solomon
- Distributed by: IMAX Corporation
- Release date: April 19, 2002
- Running time: 47 minutes
- Countries: Canada; United States
- Language: English
- Budget: $1 million
- Box office: $128,363,881

Space Station 3D (simply known as Space Station in 2D format) is a 2002 3D short documentary film about the International Space Station written, produced, edited and directed by Toni Myers. Narrated by Tom Cruise, it is the first IMAX 3D production filmed in space.

== Content ==
Space Station 3D was the first 3D live-action film to be shot in space. Using advanced 3D technology, the film tells the story of the greatest engineering feat since men landed on the Moon; the on-orbit assembly of the International Space Station as it travels 220 miles above the Earth at 17,500 mph. The film included sequences that portray the force of a rocket launch, look into the depths of space, experience life in zero gravity and accompany astronauts on a space walk."

== Release ==
The film is the highest-grossing film ever to have placed in the top 10 domestic box office, grossing $93,376,342 domestically and $34,971,266 overseas for a total worldwide gross of $128,363,881.

== Reception ==
Space Station 3D has received positive reviews. On review aggregator website Rotten Tomatoes, the film has a rating of 87%, based on 23 reviews, with an average rating of 6.93/10. Metacritic gives the film a score of 69 out of 100, based on 13 critics, indicating "generally favorable reviews".

== See also ==
- List of films featuring space stations
- List of highest-grossing documentary films
