= IMAX =

Large-screen film format

- Type: Film format
- Inventor: Graeme Ferguson; Roman Kroitor; Robert Kerr; William C. Shaw
- Inception: 1970
- Manufacturer: IMAX Corporation
- Website: imax.com

Footage of the Space Shuttle Discovery from the 1994 documentary Destiny in Space, shot using an IMAX camera by NASA astronauts

IMAX is a proprietary system of high-resolution cameras, film formats, film projectors, and cinemas originally known for having steep stadium seating and very large screens with a tall aspect ratio (about 1.43:1), though many films shot using IMAX cameras are shown in a wider format. Graeme Ferguson, Roman Kroitor, Robert Kerr, and William C. Shaw were the co-founders of what would later be named IMAX Corporation in September 1967, and they developed the first IMAX theatre projection standards in the late 1960s and early 1970s in Canada.

The largest IMAX format, Grand Theater (GT), can show 1.43:1 content on a 1.43:1 screen that is large enough to take up almost all of the audience's vision for an immersive experience. The IMAX 15/70 film format uses very large screens of 18 by 24 metres (59 by 79 feet) and, unlike most conventional film projectors, the film runs horizontally so that the image width can be greater than the width of the film stock.

IMAX is often shown in cinemas built specifically for IMAX to accommodate the taller aspect ratio. The dedicated buildings and projectors require high construction and maintenance costs, and many installations of this type limit themselves to a projection of high-quality, short documentaries. The IMAX SR and MPX systems were introduced in 1998 and 2004, respectively, to make IMAX available to existing film theaters. The SR system featured slightly smaller screens than GT theaters, though still in purpose-built auditoriums with a 1.43:1 aspect ratio. The MPX projectors were solely used to retrofit existing multiplex auditoriums with wider screens, losing much of the quality of the GT experience. IMAX Digital 2K and IMAX with Laser 4K were introduced in 2008 and 2014, respectively. Both technologies are purely digital and suitable to retrofit existing cinemas.

== History ==
A comparison between 35 mm and 15/70 mm negative areas

=== Multiscreen Corporation ===
The single-projector/single-camera system they eventually settled upon was designed and built by Shaw based upon a novel "Rolling Loop" film-transport technology purchased from Peter Ronald Wright Jones, a machine shop worker from Brisbane, Australia. Film projectors do not continuously flow the film in front of the bulb, but instead "stutter" the film travel so that each frame can be illuminated in a momentarily-paused still image. This requires a mechanical apparatus to buffer the jerky travel of the film strip. The older technology of running 70 mm film vertically through the projector used only five sprocket perforations on the sides of each frame; however, the IMAX method used fifteen perforations per frame. The previous mechanism was inadequate to handle this intermittent mechanical movement that was three times longer, and so Jones's invention was necessary for the novel IMAX projector method with its horizontal film feed. As it became clear that a single, large-screen image had more impact than multiple smaller ones and was a more viable product direction, Multiscreen changed its name to IMAX. Co-founder Graeme Ferguson explained how the name IMAX originated:

... the incorporation date [of the company was] September 1967. ... [The name change] came a year or two later. We first called the company Multiscreen Corporation because that, in fact, was what people knew us as. ... After about a year, our attorney informed us that we could never copyright or trademark Multivision. It was too generic. It was a descriptive word. The words that you can copyright are words like Kleenex or Xerox or Coca-Cola. If the name is descriptive, you can't trademark it so you have to make up a word. So we were sitting at lunch one day in a Hungarian restaurant in Montreal and we worked out a name on a placemat on which we wrote all the possible names we could think of. We kept working with the idea of the maximum image. We turned it around and came up with IMAX.

The name change actually happened more than two years later, because a key patent filed on January 16, 1970, was assigned under the original name Multiscreen Corporation, Limited. IMAX Chief Administration Officer Mary Ruby was quoted as saying, "Although many people may think 'IMAX' is an acronym, it is, in fact, a made-up word."

=== IMAX Corporation ===
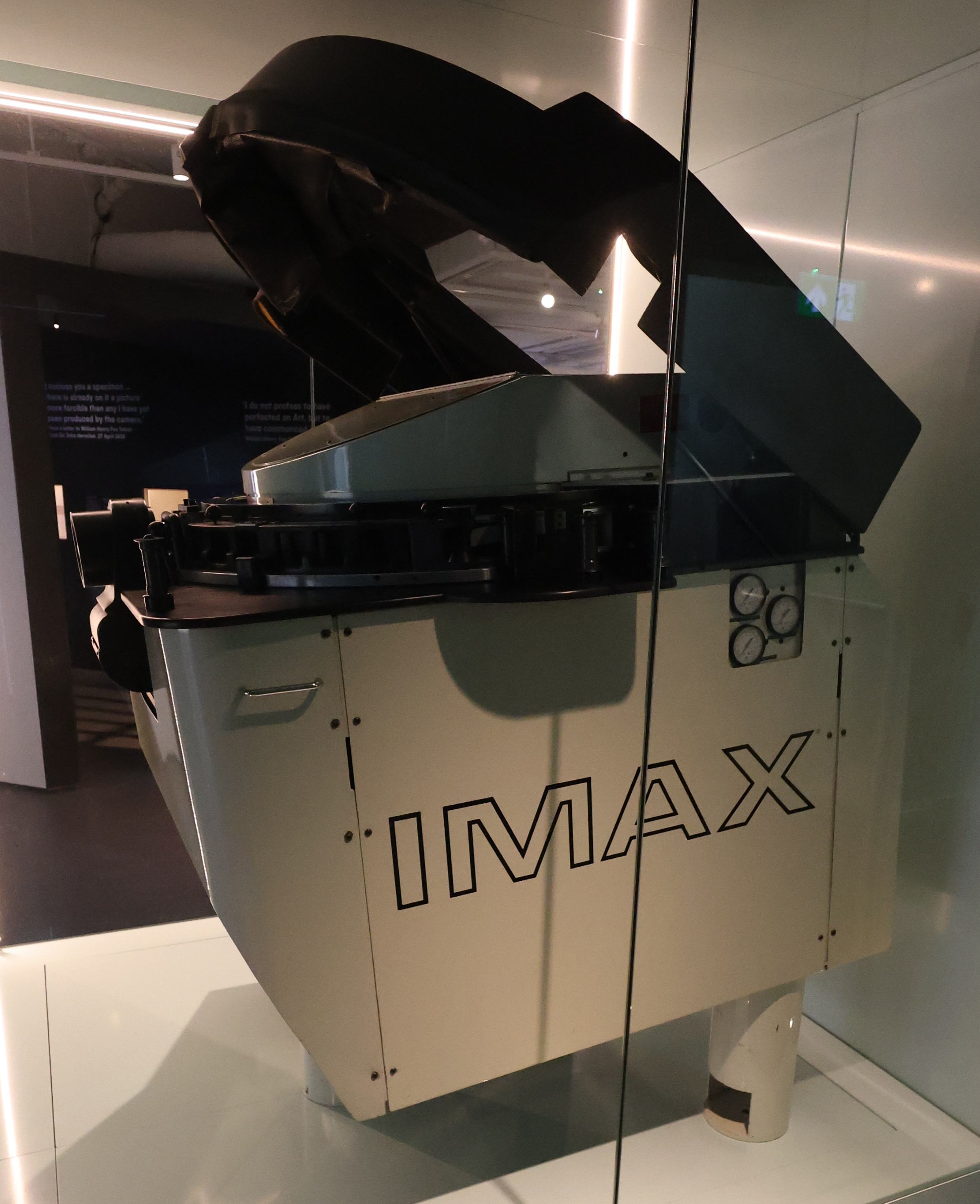
IMAX projector with horizontal film reel

Tiger Child, the first IMAX film, was demonstrated at Expo '70 in Osaka, Japan. The first permanent IMAX installation was built at the Cinesphere theatre at Ontario Place in Toronto. It debuted in May 1971, showing the film North of Superior. The installation remained in place during Ontario Place's hiatus for redevelopment. The Cinesphere was renovated while Ontario Place was closed and re-opened on November 3, 2017, with IMAX 70 mm and IMAX with laser illumination.

During Expo '74 in Spokane, Washington, an IMAX screen that measured 27×20 metres (89×66 ft) was featured in the 'Environmental Theater' of the US Pavilion, the largest structure in the expo; at the time, it was the largest movie screen in the world. It became the first IMAX Theatre to not be partnered with any other brand of movie theatres. About five million visitors viewed the short film Man Belongs to the Earth. Because the screen covered the viewer's total visual field when looking directly forward, most felt a sensation of motion and some experienced motion sickness.

The large pavilion screen was torn down after the exposition closed and was replaced by a nearby permanent IMAX film theater which opened in 1978 and was demolished in 2018; however, its screen size is less than half. Due to protests, the City of Spokane officials decided to work with the IMAX Corporation to demolish the 1978 theatre, under the condition they renovate the former US Pavilion itself into IMAX's first permanent outdoor giant-screen theatre. The plan was to use material on the inside of the structure similar to that used when first constructed. However, it was expected to last only five years, due to weather conditions destroying previous materials. In 2017, concept art was released in videos featured on Spokane's renovation site, and its budget revealed that seating was planned for more than 2,000.

The first permanent IMAX Dome installation, the Eugene Heikoff and Marilyn Jacobs Heikoff Dome Theatre at the Reuben H. Fleet Science Center, opened in San Diego's Balboa Park in 1973. It doubles as a planetarium theater. The first permanent IMAX 3D theatre was built in Vancouver, British Columbia, for Transitions at Expo '86, and was in use until September 30, 2009. It was located at the tip of Canada Place, a Vancouver landmark.

=== Digital projection ===
In 2008, IMAX expanded its brand into traditional theaters with the introduction of IMAX Digital, a lower-cost system that utilizes two 2K digital projectors to project onto a 1.90:1 aspect ratio screen. This lower-cost option, which allowed for the conversion of existing multiplex theater auditoriums, helped IMAX to grow from 300 screens worldwide at the end of 2007 to over 1,000 screens by the end of 2015. By 2017, there were 1,302 IMAX cinemas located in 75 countries, of which 1,203 were in commercial multiplexes.

The switch to digital projection came at a steep cost in image quality, with 2K projectors having roughly an order of magnitude less resolution than traditional IMAX film projectors. Maintaining the same 7-story screen size would only make this loss more noticeable, so many new cinemas were instead built with significantly smaller screens. These newer film theaters with much lower resolution and much smaller screens soon began to be referred to by the derogatory name "LieMAX", particularly because the company still marketed the new screens similarly to the old ones, without making the major differences clear to the public, going so far as to market the smallest "IMAX" screen, having 10 times less area, similarly to the largest while persisting with the same brand name.

Since 2002, some feature films have been converted into IMAX format for displaying in IMAX cinemas, and some have also been (partially) shot in IMAX. By late 2017, 1,305 IMAX systems were installed in 1,205 commercial multiplex cinemas, 13 commercial destinations, and 86 institutional settings in 75 countries, with less than a quarter of those having the capability to show 70 mm film at the resolution of the large format as originally conceived.

== Technical aspects ==
=== Camera ===
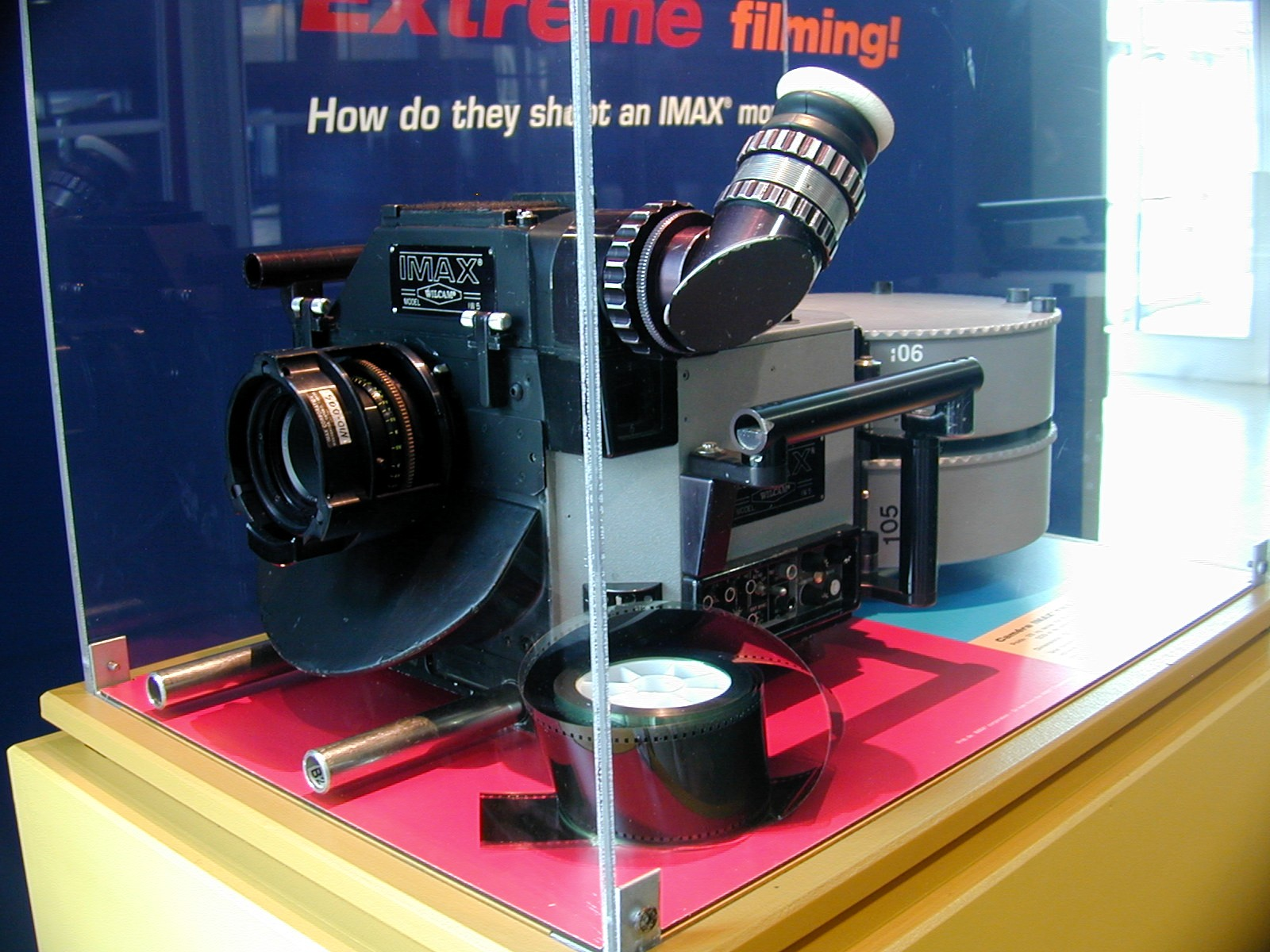
An IMAX cinema camera, displayed at the National Science and Media Museum, Bradford, United Kingdom

==== Film cameras ====
The IMAX process increases the image resolution by using a larger film frame; in relative terms, a frame of IMAX format film has three times the theoretical horizontal resolution of a frame of 35 mm film. To achieve such increased image resolution, 65 mm film stock passes horizontally through the IMAX movie camera, 15 perforations at a time. At 24 frames per second, this means that the film moves through the camera at 102.7 meters (337 ft) per minute (just over 6 km/h). In a conventional 65 mm camera, the film passes vertically through the camera, five perforations at a time, or 34 meters (112 ft) per minute. In comparison, in a conventional 35 mm camera, 35 mm film passes vertically through the camera, at four (smaller) perforations at a time, which translates to 27.4 meters (90 ft) per minute.

In the Todd-AO 70 mm-format of widescreen cinema, the image area of a 65 mm film-frame is 48.5 mm × 22.1 mm (1.91 in × 0.87 in); in the IMAX-format of widescreen cinema, the film-frame dimensions are 69.6 mm × 48.5 mm (2.74 in × 1.91 in). To match the standard image resolution of the moving image produced with the film-speed of 24 frames per second, an IMAX film requires three times the length of (negative) film stock required for a 65 mm film of comparable scope and cinematic technique.

In March 2022, IMAX announced a new initiative in collaboration with Kodak, Panavision, and FotoKem to develop "a new fleet of next-generation IMAX film cameras", to deploy the first four units in the next two years. Christopher Nolan and Jordan Peele were among a group of advisors, made up of filmmakers and cinematographers, assisting in identifying new specifications and features for the prototype development phase.

In May 2024, an interview with Collider, IMAX CEO Richard Gelfond revealed that four new identical cameras that are 30% quieter than the existing cameras would be made. The Wall Street Journal revealed that the new cameras will be made out of carbon fiber and titanium, and they will feature a five inch color display along with wireless capability. These were introduced as the Keighley IMAX cameras and were named in honor of IMAX's late Chief Quality Officer, David Keighley and his colleague and wife, Patricia.

==== Phantom 65 IMAX 3D digital camera ====
In 2011, IMAX announced a 4K 3D digital camera. The camera was developed alongside Vision Research and AbelCine, integrating two Phantom 65 engines. A prototype camera was used for the documentary Born to be Wild, in which approximately 50% of the finished film was shot with the system. The company has said they have no intention of replacing the higher resolution film cameras with the new digital camera, but the latter can be used in scenes that require a lightweight or relatively small 3D camera. While IMAX has completed the production camera and has placed it in service on several films, they have no plans to produce an IMAX film solely with the new digital system. Transformers: Age of Extinction is the first feature film partially filmed with the Phantom 65 IMAX 3D camera.

==== Arri Alexa IMAX digital camera ====
In 2015, IMAX announced a 2D digital camera that was developed alongside Arri, the camera being based on the latter company's Arri Alexa 65 technology. The first production to use the camera was Captain America: Civil War. The Russo brothers have stated that they solely used the Arri Alexa IMAX on Avengers: Infinity War (2018) and Avengers: Endgame (2019). For Transformers: The Last Knight (2017), two Arri Alexa IMAX cameras were combined in a rig to provide native 3D, with the film containing 98% of IMAX footage.

==== IMAX-certified cameras ====
In September 2020, IMAX launched the "Filmed in IMAX" program (later renamed to "Filmed for IMAX"), which certifies high-quality digital cameras that can be used to create IMAX-format films. As the scope of certified cameras expands, it will be easier for filmmakers to create films to meet the projection needs of the IMAX giant screen theaters.

IMAX certified cameras	Resolution
ARRI Alexa LF	4.5K (4448 x 3096)
ARRI Alexa Mini LF	4.5K (4448 x 3096)
Panavision Millennium DXL2	8K (8192 x 4320)
RED Ranger Monstro	8K (8192 x 4320)
RED V-Raptor	8K (8192 x 4320)
Sony CineAlta VENICE	6K (6048 x 4032)
ARRI Alexa 65 IMAX	6.5K (6560 × 3100)
Fujifilm GFX ETERNA 55	8K (8192 x 4320)

Top Gun: Maverick (shot with the Sony CineAlta Venice) and Dune (shot with the Arri Alexa LF and Mini LF) were among the first films that used IMAX-certified cameras. Other films between 2021 and 2023 that captured with this program are The Suicide Squad (shot with the Red Ranger Monstro and Komodo), Shang-Chi and the Legend of the Ten Rings (shot with the Arri Alexa LF and Mini LF), The Battle at Lake Changjin and The Battle at Lake Changjin II (shot with the Red Ranger Monstro), Eternals (shot with the Arri Alexa LF and Mini LF), Doctor Strange in the Multiverse of Madness (shot with Panavision Millennium DXL2), Thor: Love and Thunder (shot with the Arri Alexa LF and Mini LF), Black Panther: Wakanda Forever (shot with the Sony CineAlta Venice), Guardians of the Galaxy Vol. 3 (shot with the Red V-Raptor), The Marvels (shot with the Arri Alexa LF and Mini LF) and Dune: Part Two (shot with the Arri Alexa LF and Mini LF).

=== Film stock ===
The IMAX format is generically called "15/70" film, the name referring to the 15 sprocket holes or perforations per frame. The film's bulk and weight require horizontal platters, rather than conventional vertically mounted film reels. IMAX film is fed through the projector horizontally, and the film is drawn from the inner circumference of the platter, not from the outer circumference like in conventional film reels. A system is in place to keep the film in the outer circumference from flying outwards due to centrifugal force while the platter is spinning. IMAX film is shipped to theaters in several small reels that are spliced into one continuous length that is then wound into a platter, a process that may take hours to complete. Films may be several kilometers in length: Avatar, which was 2:45 hours in duration, was close to 16 km (9.9 mi) long. Platters are handled using special forklifts. IMAX platters range from 1.2 to 1.83 m (3.9 to 6.0 ft) diameter to accommodate 1 to 3 hours of film. Platters with a 2.5-hour feature film weigh 250 kg (550 lb). IMAX uses ESTAR-based print film in their 15/70 rolling-loop film projection systems. ESTAR-based print film provides greater precision. The chemical development process does not change the size or shape of ESTAR print film, and IMAX's pin registration system (especially that of the camera mechanism) does not tolerate either sprocket-hole or film-thickness variations, but the film can still swell or shrink under varying temperature and humidity. This requires projection booths to be kept at a temperature of between 20 and 23.8 °C (68.0 and 74.8 °F) and a humidity of 50%. The film is too large to be moved using its sprockets, so they are instead used for registration, to aid in aligning the film. A feature film platter can cost US$36,000 to print. The camera negative is actually 65 mm film stock, but it runs horizontally and with 15 perforations per frame. The camera, like the projector, has a vacuum system; this makes the camera noisy, forbidding the sync-sound recording of quiet scenes. The camera has enough film for three minutes of shooting. The large frame of the film also imposes optical limitations such as an extremely shallow depth of field when shooting with an open aperture.

=== Soundtrack – double-system ===
To use more of the image area, IMAX film does not include an embedded soundtrack. Instead, the IMAX system specifies a separate six-channel 35 mm (1.4 in) magnetic film, recorded and played back on a film follower locked to picture, just as Vitaphone had been (utilizing 16-inch 33 1/3 RPM electrical transcription discs) in the early 20th century, and was the same technology used to provide the 7-channel soundtrack accompanying films photographed and exhibited in the Cinerama process in the mid-1950s. By the early 1990s, a separate DTS-based 6-track digital sound system was used, similarly locked to the projector by a SMPTE time code synchronization apparatus, the audio played off a series of proprietarily encoded CD-ROM discs. In the late 1990s, IMAX upgraded this system to use a hard drive that carries a single uncompressed audio file. These are converted directly to analogue rather than processed through a decoding method such as DTS. IMAX film and IMAX digital theaters utilize a 6-channel surround sound system, with Left, Center, Right speakers positioned behind the screen, similar to conventional theaters, plus an additional "top-center" speaker to create the effect of height on the screen. There are also 2 rear left and rear right surround sound speaker, arranged as clusters of speakers rather than a spaced array of speakers such as used in a Dolby surround sound system. IMAX with Laser adds another 6 channels of sound: 4 channels of overhead speakers plus 2 extra side surround speakers.

== Projectors ==
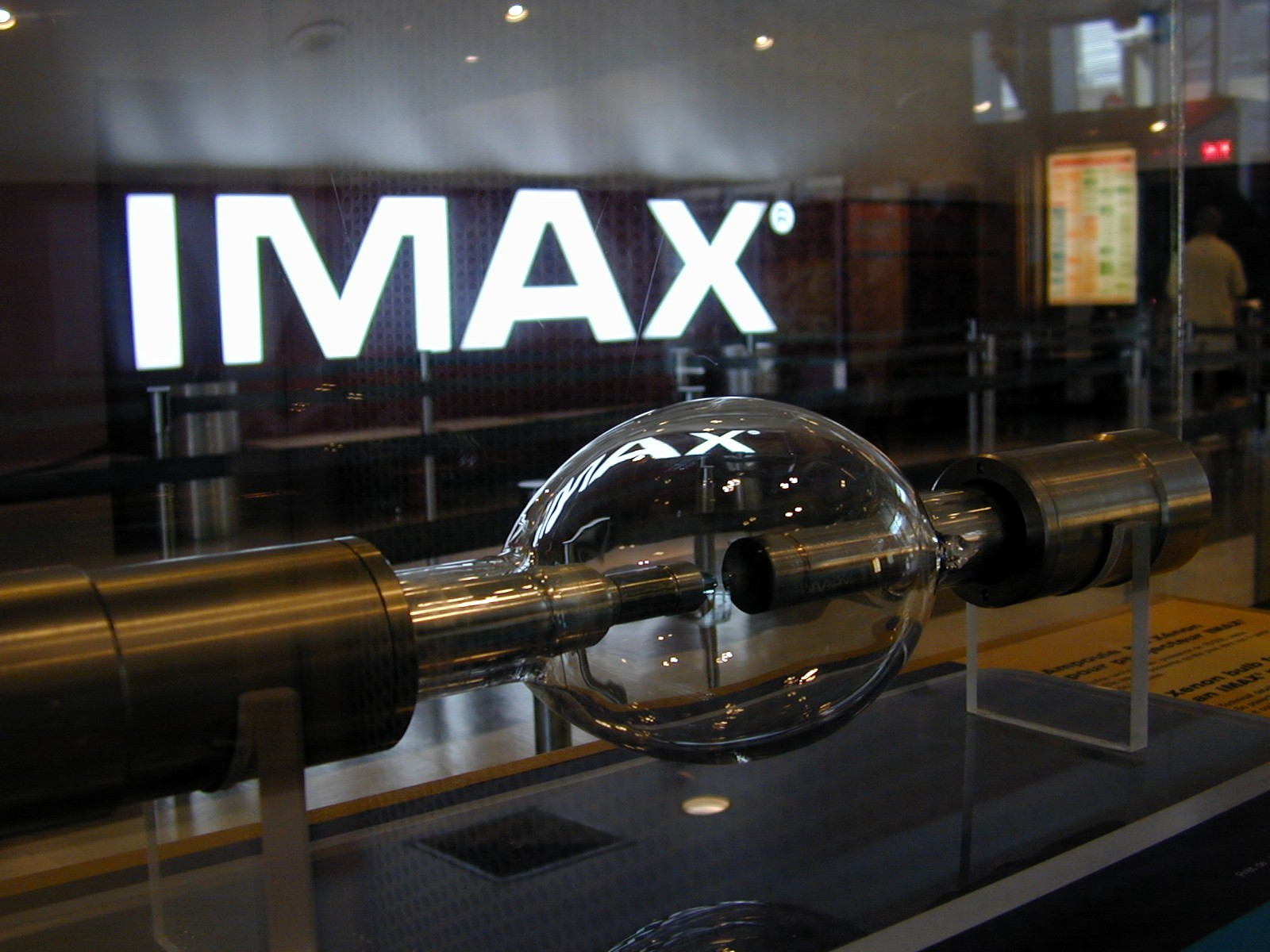
The 15 kW Xenon short-arc lamp used in IMAX film projectors, as seen here, being displayed at the Montreal Science Centre

Transporting the large film stock through the optical system presented challenges for both the camera and the projector. Conventional 70 mm systems were not steady enough for the 586× magnification. On the projector side, William Shaw adapted an Australian patent (no. 291,375) for film transport called the "rolling loop" by adding a compressed air "puffer" to accelerate the film, and put a cylindrical lens in the projector's "aperture block". The rolling loop mechanism is used to move the film in projectors and cameras; the sprockets in the film are only used for registration as the film is too large to be moved with sprockets at the necessary speeds for projection and filming without damage.

The projector uses a vacuum to pull the film into contact with this lens. Thus, the "field flattener" flattens the image field. The lens is twice the height of the film and connects to a pneumatic piston so it can be moved up or down while the projector is running. This way, if a piece of dust comes off the film and sticks to the lens, the projectionist can switch to a clean portion of the lens at the push of a button. The lens also has "wiper bars" made of a felt or brush-like material that wipes dust off the lens as it moves up or down. The projector uses a vacuum to keep the film flat and oriented correctly for projection. The shutter of an IMAX projector is also kept open for longer than a 35 mm projector shutter to increase image brightness.

IMAX projectors are pin-stabilized; this means that four registration pins engage the perforations at the corners of the projected frame to ensure perfect alignment. Shaw added cam-controlled arms to decelerate each frame to eliminate the microscopic shaking as the frame "settled" onto the registration pins. The projector's shutter is open around 20% longer than in conventional equipment, and the light source is brighter. The xenon short-arc lamps are made with a thin envelope of fused quartz and contain xenon gas at a pressure of about 25 atmospheres (367 psi (2,530 kPa)). Because of this, projectionists are required to wear protective body armor when changing or handling the lamp in case it breaks (e.g., due to a drop to the floor) because of the danger from flying quartz shards propelled by the high pressure of the xenon gas within; this applies to all projection xenon lamps. An IMAX xenon lamp runs on DC power, lasts for 1,000 hours and requires its own pump and water cooler. The projector's optics also require compressed air cooling. An IMAX projector weighs up to 1.8 tonnes (2 short tons) and is over 178 cm (5.8 ft) tall and 195 cm (6.4 ft) long. The projector is raised and locked into position before each screening.

IMAX Corporation has released four projector types that use its 15-perforation, 70 mm film format: GT (Grand Theatre), GT 3D (Dual Rotor), SR (Small Rotor), and MPX, which was designed for retrofitted theatres. In July 2008, the company introduced a digital projection system, which it has not given a distinct name or brand, designed for multiplex theatres with screens no wider than 21.3 m (70 ft). All IMAX projectors, except the standard GT system, can project 3D images. GT 3D projectors require two separate lamps and polarized projection optics.

== Digital projection ==
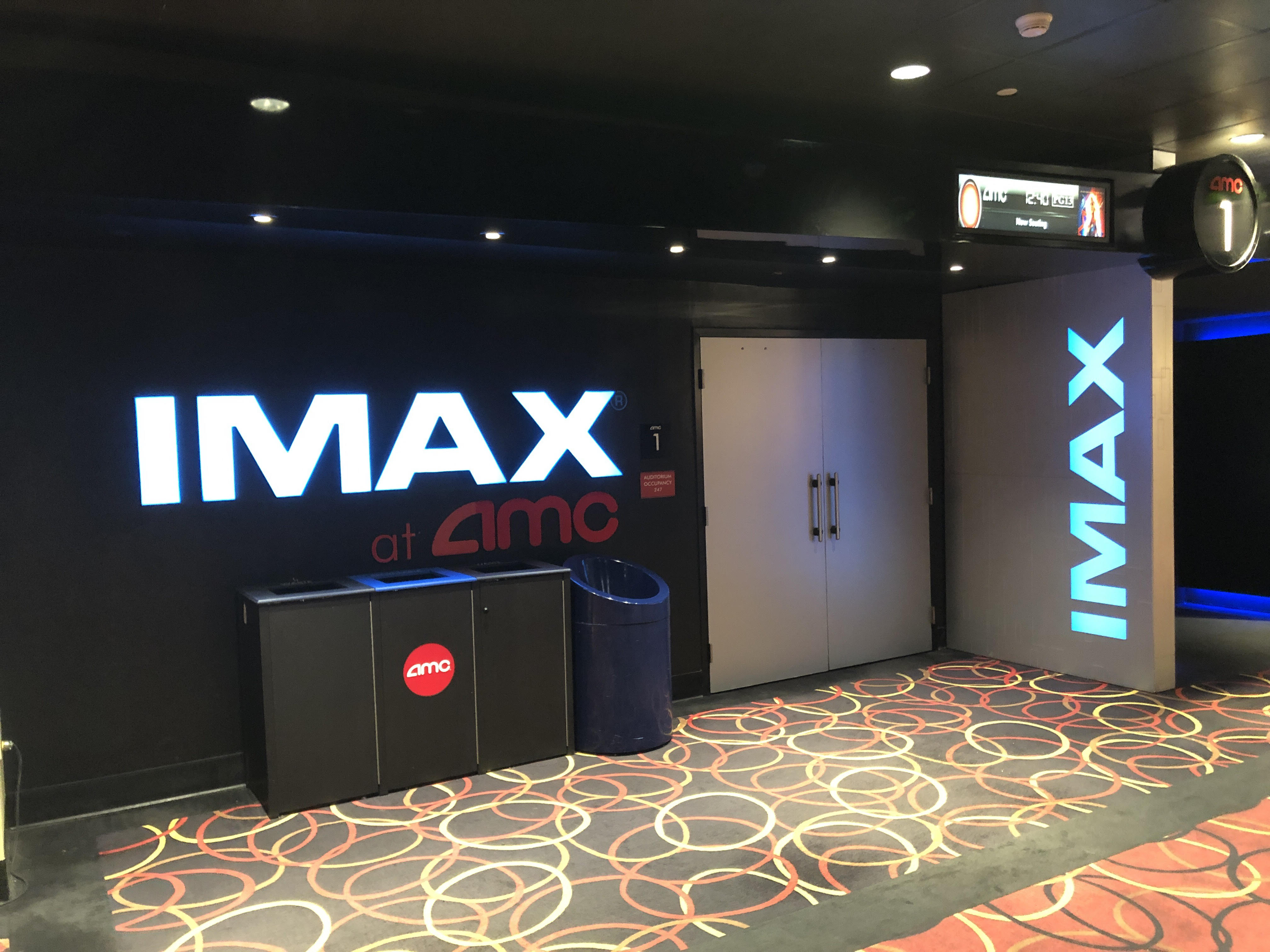
An entrance to an IMAX digital theater, such as the AMC Barton Creek Square 14 in Austin, Texas

The digital cinema IMAX projection system, which debuted in 2008, is designed for use with shorter 1.90:1 aspect ratio screens. The system uses two 2K projectors that can present either 2D or 3D content in DCI or IMAX Digital Format (IDF; which in itself is a superset of DCI). IDF initially used 2K-resolution Christie xenon projectors, with a Texas Instruments Digital Light Processing (DLP) engine, but in 2012 IMAX announced that they would be switching to Barco as their primary supplier. The two 2K images are projected superimposed on each other with a half-pixel offset, using super-resolution imaging to increase the perceived resolution to approximately 2.9K.

For 3D presentations, one projector is used to display the image for each eye, while 2D presentations use the superimposed images to allow for a brighter 75 cd/m^{2} image. The IMAX Digital projection system includes a proprietary IMAX Image Enhancer that modifies the output of the digital media server based on feedback from cameras and microphones in the auditorium, and maintains alignment with sub-pixel accuracy.

Mainly because the system facilitates inexpensive distribution of IMAX features, the company announced in February 2012 that they were renovating specially selected locations around the world to present both 70 mm analog as well as digital presentations. To do so, IMAX developed a rail system that moves the projectors in and out to accommodate either a full-frame film print or a digital-only release. These theaters were prepared in time for the release of The Dark Knight Rises in July 2012.

== Laser projection ==
In April 2012, IMAX began testing a new 4K laser projection system, based on patents licensed from Eastman Kodak. Like the 3D film and digital systems, it used two projectors, but it improved over the smaller digital screens by retaining the traditional IMAX aspect ratio and letting films be shown on screens 36 m (118 ft) wide or more. In December 2014, IMAX began rolling out its new dual 4K laser projector system, dubbed "IMAX with Laser" and known as IMAX GT, with the first installation occurring at the Cineplex Scotiabank Theatre in Toronto. The system allows digital projection of the 1.43:1 aspect ratio surface of a traditional IMAX screen, but can also be used on other screens, e.g. with a 1.90:1 aspect ratio.

The system replaces the xenon arc lamp of a traditional digital projector with a laser light source, and is capable of 60 fps with "50 percent greater" brightness than the Digital Cinema Initiatives spec, a contrast ratio "double" that of IMAX 15/70 mm film projection and "higher" than the 2,500:1 contrast ratio of IMAX's xenon lamp-based projection systems, and displaying the full Rec. 2020 color gamut. The system also features a new 12-channel surround sound system, which adds speakers on either side of the theater as well as four new overhead speakers.

While still not matching the theoretical resolution of traditional IMAX film, which is estimated at up to 12,000 lines of horizontal resolution on the 65 mm camera negative (12K) and approximately 6,000 on a 35 mm release print (6K), the new laser system features dual-4K resolution projectors, each capable of displaying four times the detail of one IMAX Digital projector. Like IMAX Digital, images from the two projectors are projected superimposed on each other with a half-pixel offset, using super-resolution imaging, which makes the perceived resolution greater than 4K. In-theater cameras and microphones are used to automatically calibrate the projectors and sound system between showings. For 3D presentations, one projector is used to display the image for each eye, while 2D presentations use the superimposed images to allow for a brighter image. For 3D presentations, IMAX with Laser systems use dichroic filter glasses, similar to those used by Dolby 3D, as opposed to the linear polarization glasses used in IMAX Digital theaters.

On April 24, 2018, IMAX announced that they would begin rolling out a new single-unit version of their laser projector system later that year, with this iteration designed to replace the IMAX Xenon digital projection system for 1.90:1 screens.

== Theatres ==
IMAX theatres are described as either "Classic Design" (purpose-built structures), or "Multiplex Design" (retro-fitted auditoriums). Classic IMAX theatre construction differs significantly from conventional theatres. The increased resolution lets the audience be much closer to the screen. Typically, all rows are within one screen height – conventional theatre seating runs 8 to 12-screen heights. Also, the rows of seats are set at a steep angle (up to 30° in some domed theatres) so that the audience is facing the screen directly.

The world's largest IMAX screen as of 2021 stands in Leonberg near Stuttgart, Germany, and measures 38 by 22 m (125 by 72 ft). Until the Leonberg IMAX opened in 2021, the largest operating IMAX screen was in IMAX Melbourne, located within the Melbourne Museum in Melbourne, Australia, measuring 32 m × 23 m (105 ft × 75 ft). Until its demolition in 2016, the world's largest IMAX screen had been in IMAX Sydney in Darling Harbour, Sydney, Australia, measuring 35.72 m × 29.57 m (117.2 ft × 97.0 ft). It reopened on 12 October 2023, with a screen measuring 693 square meters 31.2 by 22.2 m (102 by 73 ft) within The Ribbon building, after years of extensive redevelopment, making it the world's third-largest screen.

== Variations ==
=== Dome and Omnimax ===
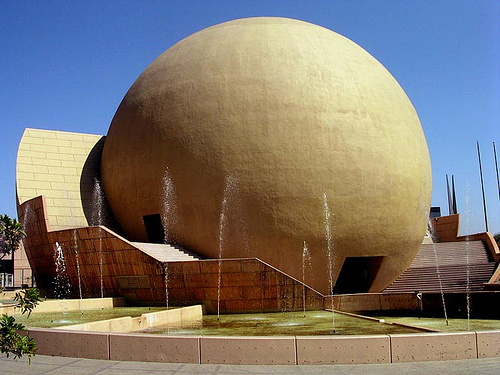
Outside of the IMAX dome in Tijuana, Baja California, Mexico

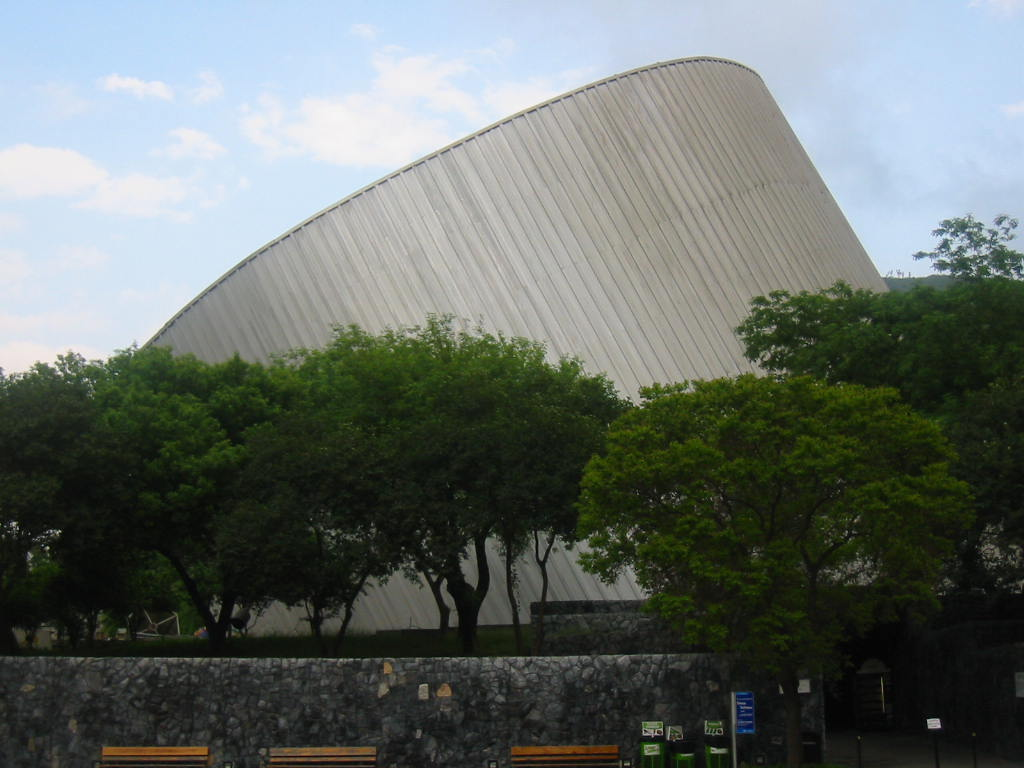
Planetario Alfa, museum, astronomical observatory and IMAX Dome system, Monterrey, Nuevo León, Mexico

The frame layout of the IMAX Dome film

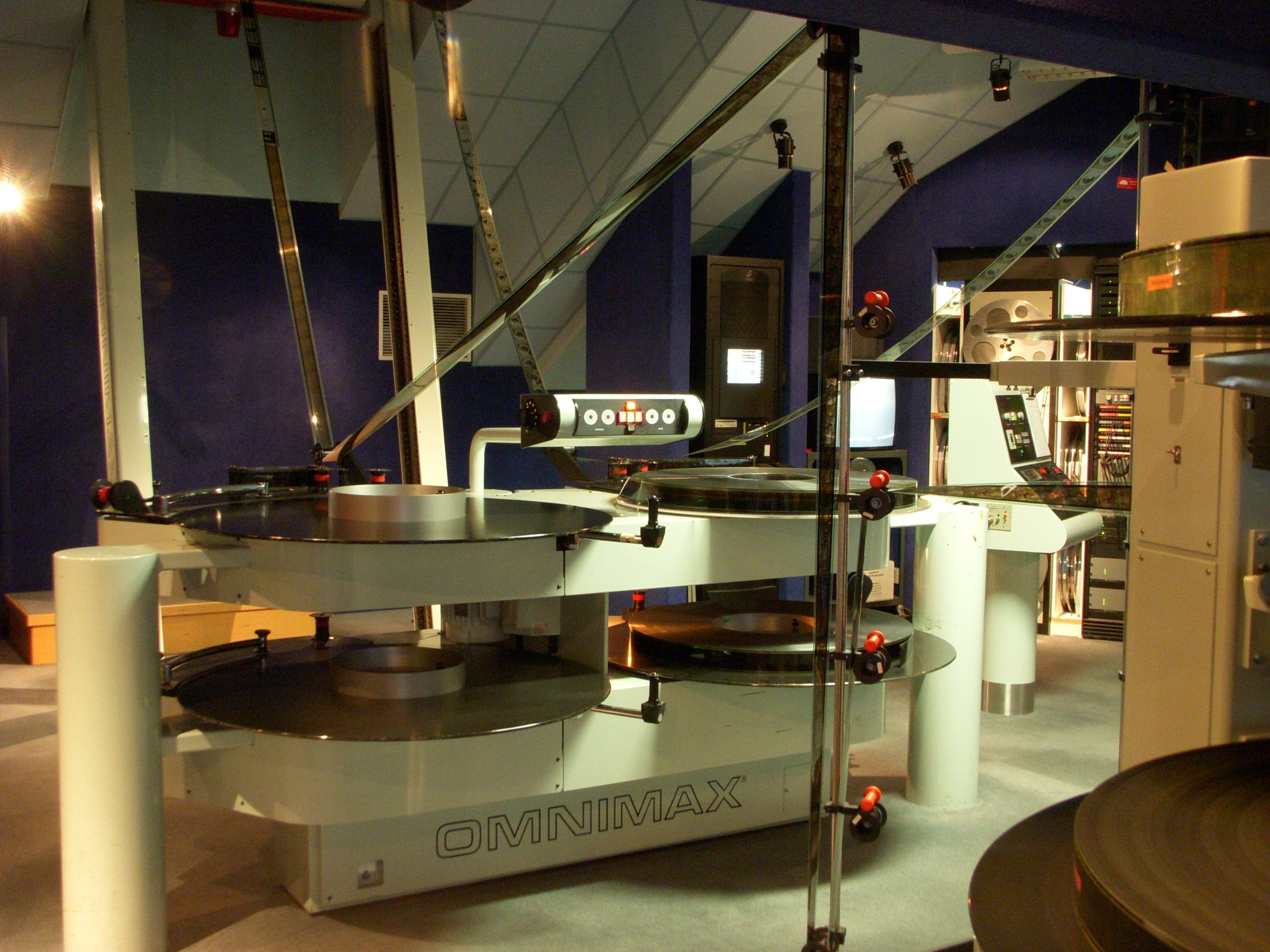
The control room of an IMAX Dome theatre at Cosmonova at the Swedish Museum of Natural History in Stockholm, Sweden

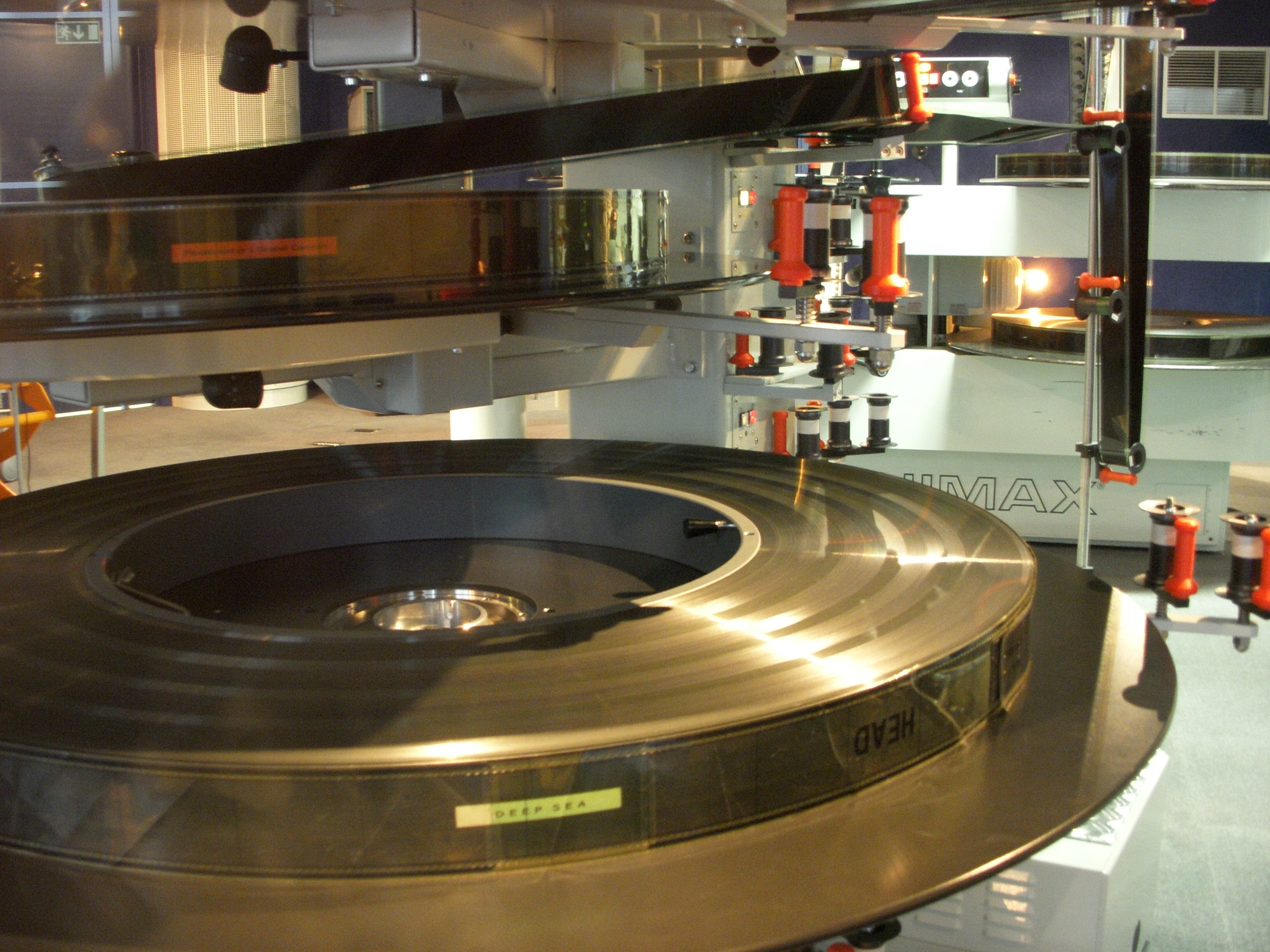
Closeup of an IMAX Dome 70 mm film reel at Cosmonova

In the late 1960s, the San Diego Hall of Science (later known as the San Diego Space and Science Foundation) began searching North America for a large-format film system to project on the dome of their planned 23.16 m (76.0 ft) tilted dome planetarium. The standard IMAX projector was unsuitable for use inside a dome because it had a 3.65 m (12.0 ft) tall lamp house on top. IMAX Corporation redesigned its system, adding an elevator to lift the projector to the center of the dome from the projection booth below. Spectra Physics designed a suitable lamphouse that took smaller, 46 cm (18 in) lamps and placed the bulb behind the lens instead of above the projector. In 1970, Ernst Leitz Canada, Ltd. (now ELCAN Optical Technologies) won a contract to develop and manufacture a fisheye lens projection system optimized to project an image onto a dome instead of a flat screen.

The dome system, which the San Diego Hall of Science called "Omnimax", uses films shot with a camera equipped with a fisheye lens that squeezes a highly distorted anamorphic 180° field of view onto the 65 mm IMAX film. The lens is aligned below the center of the frame, and most of the bottom half of the circular field falls beyond the edge of the film. The part of the field that would fall below the edge of the dome is masked. When filming, the camera is aimed upward at an angle that matches the tilt of the dome. When projected through a matching fisheye lens onto a dome, the original panoramic view is recreated. Omnimax wraps 180° horizontally, 100° above the horizon and 22° below the horizon for a viewer at the center of the dome. Omnimax debuted in 1973, showing Voyage to the Outer Planets (produced by Graphic Films) and Garden Isle (by Roger Tilton Films) on a double bill. Later in the 1970s a successful Omnimax center was built at Caesars Palace, Las Vegas, and ran strongly through the 1980s and 1990s, eventually being closed and rebuilt.

IMAX has since renamed its Omnimax system "IMAX Dome", but some theaters (primarily those opened before the 2000s) continue to call it "Omnimax". IMAX Dome theatres are used in theme parks and many North American museums, particularly those with a scientific focus, where the technical aspects of the system may be highlighted as part of the attraction. The projection room is often windowed to allow public viewing of the equipment in operation, and it is often accompanied by informational placards like other exhibits. For some theaters, before the show begins, the screen can be backlit to show the speakers and girders behind it.

The screen may be a permanent fixture, such as at the Museum of Science and Industry (Henry Crown Space Center) in Chicago, Illinois; the Fort Worth Museum of Science and History; the Franklin Institute in Philadelphia, Pennsylvania; the St. Louis Science Center; Boston's Museum of Science; Richmond's Science Museum of Virginia; the Charlotte Observer IMAX Dome Theatre at Discovery Place, Charlotte, North Carolina; Birmingham, Alabama's McWane Science Center; US Space and Rocket Center in Huntsville, Alabama; the Cincinnati Museum Center at Union Terminal; the Great Lakes Science Center in Cleveland, Ohio; the Ontario Science Centre in Toronto, Ontario; and Science World in Vancouver, British Columbia.

Alternatively, the dome may be lowered and raised as needed, such as at the Science Museum of Minnesota, and the former installation at the Canadian Museum of History (where it shared an auditorium with a standard IMAX screen, all replaced with a Barco CINE+ digital theatre system in 2016). The entire dome could be raised to show flat-screen features, and repositioned for immersive features. While the majority of museum installations focus on educational and documentary films, on special occasions, entertainment films are also shown, such as Charlie and the Chocolate Factory at the Oregon Museum of Science and Industry. The largest screen in North America is at the Science World in Vancouver, British Columbia, which has a dome screen 27 metres (89 ft) in size.

Due to the age of the IMAX Dome format as well as its entirely analogue nature, some theatres may opt to replace their existing IMAX Dome systems with newer, more versatile digital systems. Examples of former IMAX Dome theatres that have had their IMAX equipment replaced with newer equipment include the Omni-Theatre at Science Centre Singapore, the National Museum of Natural Science in Taichung, Taiwan (which both had their original IMAX Dome 1570 projection systems installed respectively in 1987 and 1985 replaced with Evans & Sutherland Digistar 5 8K digital systems in 2015), and the Jennifer Chalsty Planetarium at Liberty Science Center in Jersey City, New Jersey, which replaced its IMAX Dome 1570 projection system from 1993 (when built was the largest IMAX Dome/OMNIMAX theatre in the world) with an Evans & Sutherland Digistar 6 "True8K" digital system in 2017.

In November 2018, the Hackworth IMAX dome in The Tech Museum (now The Tech Interactive) replaced its 70 mm IMAX projector with a 4K IMAX Laser projector. It became the first digital IMAX Laser dome theater in the world.

=== 3D ===
To create the illusion of depth, the IMAX 3D process uses two separate camera lenses that represent the left and right eyes. The lenses are separated by a distance of 64 mm (2.5 in), the average distance between a human's eyes. Two separate rolls of film are used to capture the images they produce. The IMAX 3D camera weighs over 113 kg (249 lb). By projecting the two films superimposed on the screen and using one of several available methods to direct only the correct image to each eye, viewers see a 3D image on a 2D screen. One method is to use polarizing filters to oppositely polarize the light used in projecting each image. The viewer wears glasses with polarizing filters oriented to match the projector filters, so that the filter over each eye blocks the light used to project the images intended for the other eye. In another method, the two projections rapidly alternate. While one image is being shown, the projection of its mate is blocked. Each frame is shown more than once to increase the rate and suppress flicker. The viewer wears shutter glasses with liquid crystal shutters that block or transmit light in sync with the projectors, so each eye sees only the images meant for it. Several of the early films that had been produced in Digital 3D for release in conventional theaters were also presented in IMAX 3D, including Avatar, Gravity and The Amazing Spider-Man. The first full-color IMAX 3D film was the 1986 short documentary Transitions, produced for Expo 86 in Vancouver.

=== HD ===
Variations on IMAX included the 48 frames per second IMAX HD process, which sought to produce smoother, more lifelike motion, while also reducing the blurring of moving objects, by doubling the normal film rate. The IMAX HD system was tested in 1992 at the Canada Pavilion of the Seville Expo '92 with the film Momentum. Higher production costs, and the high "wear-and-tear" on the prints and projectors, doomed the IMAX HD system, but, not before many theatres had been retrofitted to project at 48 frames, especially in Canada, in order to play Momentum. In the 1990s, theme parks in Thailand, Germany, and Las Vegas used IMAX HD for their Motion Simulator rides. The Disney parks attraction Soarin' Over California features a modification of both IMAX HD and IMAX Dome, projecting in 48 frames per second.

=== Digital ===
Because 70 mm film and projectors are costly, difficult to produce en masse, and the size of auditoriums that house full-size IMAX screens make them expensive to construct, IMAX debuted a digital projection system in 2008 to use with 1.90:1 aspect ratio screens. It uses two 2K-resolution projectors that can present either 2D or 3D content in DCI or IMAX Digital Format (IDF; which in itself is a superset of DCI). The digital installations have caused some controversy, as many theaters have branded their screens as IMAX after merely retrofitting standard auditoriums with IMAX Digital projectors. The screen sizes in these auditoriums are much smaller than those in the purpose-built auditoriums of the original 15/70 IMAX format, and are limited to the 1.90:1 aspect ratio. Another disadvantage is the much lower resolution of IMAX Digital. The technology has a maximum perceived resolution of 2.9K, compared to traditional IMAX 70 mm projection, which has an estimated resolution of 12K. Some reviewers have also noted that many non-IMAX theaters are projecting films at 4K resolution through competing brands such as Dolby Cinema and UltraAVX.

IMAX has held to a uniform branding of "The IMAX Experience" across various underlying technologies and screen sizes. Some have criticized the company's marketing approach, with the format being dubbed "Lie-MAX". The company has defended the format by saying it has a bigger screen, brighter picture and better sound than standard theatres. Despite the differences with digital IMAX, the cost-effective format has aided in the company's worldwide growth, especially in Russia and China.

=== IMAXShift ===
In May 2016, IMAX announced the test launch of IMAXShift, a multimedia indoor cycling concept, but decided to discontinue it June 4, 2017.

=== Virtual reality ===
On September 2, 2016, IMAX announced plans to include virtual reality (VR) into the IMAX theater experience with the opening of a new VR center in Los Angeles that would use a new StarVR headset created by Acer. The VR experience was intended for short but interactive videos. IMAX opened a total of seven IMAX VR centers and established a US$50 million fund for the creation of VR content, as well as collaborating with Google for the production of IMAX VR cameras. However, as of May 2021, all seven IMAX VR centers have closed.

== Films ==
=== Entertainment ===
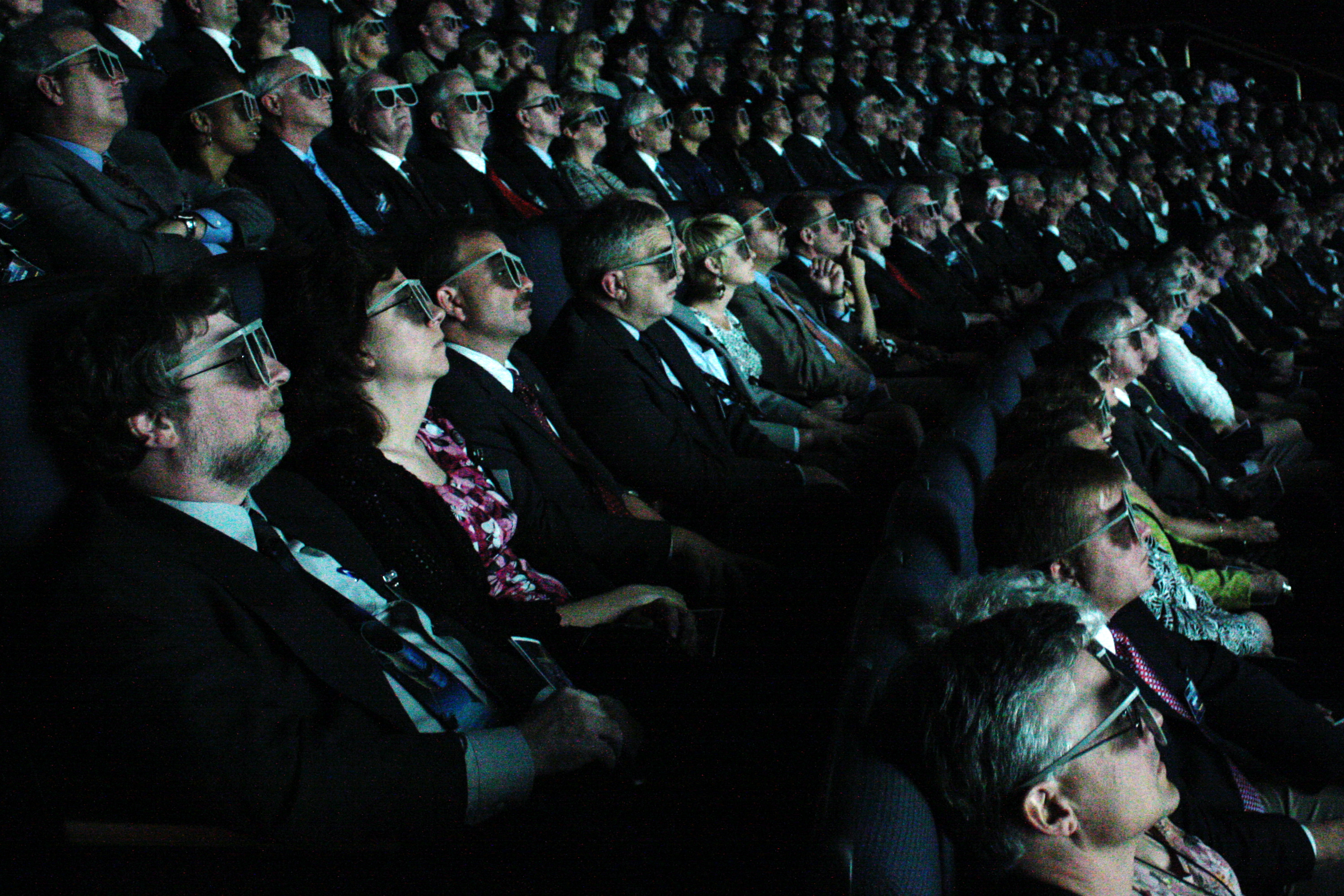
An audience viewing an IMAX film using 3D glasses

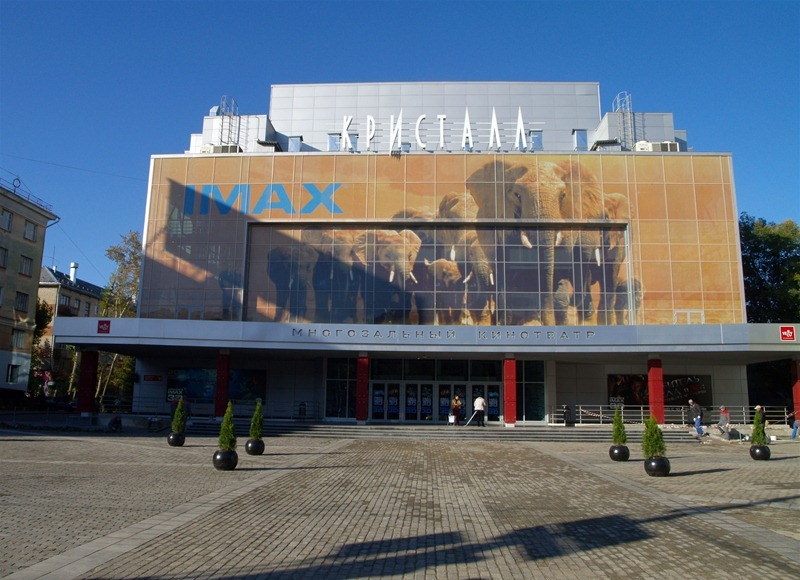
A movie theatre in Perm, Russia, advertising itself as having IMAX

In the US, IMAX has mostly been used for specialty applications. The expense and logistical challenges of producing and presenting IMAX films have led to approximately 40 minutes shorter running times than conventional films. Most are documentaries suited for institutional venues such as museums and science centers. IMAX cameras have been used while orbiting the Earth, climbing Mount Everest, exploring the bottom of the Atlantic Ocean, and visiting the Antarctic. A film about the Mars Exploration Rovers, titled Roving Mars (2006), used exclusive data from the rovers.

An early attempt at presenting mainstream entertainment in IMAX format was The Rolling Stones: Live at the Max (1991), an 85-minute compilation of concert footage filmed in IMAX during the rock band's 1990 Steel Wheels tour, edited to give the impression of a single concert. In the 1990s, more entertainment short films were created, notably T-Rex: Back to the Cretaceous in 1998, and Haunted Castle in 2001 (both in 3D). In 1995, French director Jean-Jacques Annaud directed Wings of Courage, the first dramatic picture shot for IMAX. In 1998 and 1999, More and The Old Man and the Sea became the first short films produced using the IMAX format; both earned Academy Award nominations, with Old Man and the Sea becoming the only IMAX film to win an Academy Award. In 2000, Disney produced Fantasia 2000, the first full-length animated feature initially released exclusively in the IMAX format.

=== Use in Hollywood productions ===
Before the end of the 1990s, theatrical features were deemed impossible to run in IMAX venues at the time, as there was a technical limitation on the size of the film reel where films had to run around two hours. Originally, IMAX and Pixar considered releasing Toy Story in IMAX 3D, but test results showed that the render resolution could not match the size of the IMAX image. DreamWorks in the early 2000s wanted to re-release Shrek in IMAX 3D, but this too was canceled as a result of creative changes in the studio. These failed attempts at re-releases did inspire IMAX to experiment and improve their ability in presenting computer animation in their theaters. Their compilation CyberWorld was the result, which contained new original animation and IMAX-presented versions of computer-animated tests and music videos. Cyberworld even presented open-matte 3D versions of the bar sequence from Antz and the "Homer3" segment from The Simpsons; both coincidentally were animated at Pacific Data Images.

Walt Disney Pictures became the first studio to release theatrical films in the IMAX process. Released on New Year's Day in 2000, Fantasia 2000 was the studio's first IMAX release and the first theatrical feature presented in IMAX theaters. It was originally planned as a standard theatrical release, but in agreeing with the company to release the film, the IMAX sound system incorporated a multi-channel and multi-layer stereo system for the orchestrated soundtrack, similar to the Fantasound system Walt Disney had envisioned for the original film in 1940. The company agreed to Disney's terms and conditions to gain the exclusive first showings of the film. These included a limited engagement of four months (from January 1 to April 30) and 50% of the box office receipts. Not all IMAX theatres were prepared to accept Disney's terms to present the film; however, following the IMAX release, a standard 35 mm run followed in June at regular theaters.

Although Fantasia 2000 had a lukewarm financial run, the critical praise for its use of the IMAX format convinced Disney to put more releases in the giant-screen format in the pipeline. In 2002, IMAX re-releases of Beauty and the Beast and The Lion King were released in select theaters over the winter and Christmas seasons of that year. New digital masters were created from the original Computer Animation Production System (CAPS) production files, and select scenes of animation were cleaned up to make use of the high-resolution IMAX film negatives. Treasure Planet was also released in select IMAX theaters and was the first theatrical film released in regular and IMAX theaters simultaneously. But all of these releases had underwhelming box office returns and Disney canceled later big-screen re-releases, including Aladdin.

With the unveiling of the DMR process, Warner Bros. Pictures especially embraced the format beginning in 2003 with the two Matrix sequels, Reloaded and Revolutions. Since The Prisoner of Azkaban in 2004, Warner Bros. began releasing the Harry Potter film franchise in IMAX to strong financial success. Also in 2004, the studio released Robert Zemeckis' motion-capture film The Polar Express in IMAX 3D. Polar Express became the most successful film released in IMAX theaters, producing at least a quarter of the film's gross of $302 million from fewer than 100 IMAX screens. Success for Warner Bros. and IMAX followed in later years with I Am Legend, Happy Feet, Batman Begins and The Dark Knight. Progressively other studios became further interested in releasing films in IMAX through the DMR process and have earned success through it. In May 2009, J. J. Abrams's Star Trek was released in IMAX venues for the initial two weeks of its theatrical run and opened to $8.3 million. The IMAX opening weekends of The Avengers and Harry Potter and the Deathly Hallows – Part 2 have since grossed $15 million.

Though they were not filmed with IMAX cameras, Skyfall and The Amazing Spider-Man were optimized for IMAX Digital screens when they were released. Both movies were filmed in high-resolution cameras and the digital negative ratio was equal to that of the IMAX Digital frame. Skyfall increased the visual information of the entire film while Amazing Spider-Man optimized the finale battle with the Lizard. When James Cameron's Titanic was restored and re-released in theaters there was also specially made open-matte version for IMAX. In 2010, after years of successful IMAX DMR releases, Warner Bros. signed a deal to release up to 20 feature films in IMAX up to 2013, including educational documentaries that were in production.

In May 2015, Marvel Studios announced that its next two Avengers films – Avengers: Infinity War (2018) and Avengers: Endgame (2019) – would be filmed entirely in IMAX, the first Hollywood feature films to do so, using a modified version of Arri's Alexa 65 digital camera. The camera was used first to film select sequences in another Marvel production, 2016's Captain America: Civil War.

=== DMR (Digital Media Remastering) ===
IMAX's proprietary DMR (Digital Media Remastering) process up-converts conventional films to IMAX format. This special digital intermediate technology lets IMAX venues show films shot on 35 mm for conventional theaters. In 2002, Star Wars: Episode II – Attack of the Clones and an IMAX-format re-release of the 1995 film Apollo 13, were the first official applications of the DMR process. Because of projection limitations at the time, the studios had to edit Apollo 13 and Attack of the Clones to have a shorter playing time. As IMAX updated the system and expanded the size of the platters, the later DMR releases did not have this limitation; current platters provide a run time of up to 180 minutes. Reviewers have generally praised the results of the DMR blowup process, which are visually and audibly superior to the same films projected in 35 mm. But some filmmakers, such as producer Frank Marshall, point out that DMR blowups are not comparable to films created directly in the 70 mm 15 perf IMAX format, and that directors Ron Howard and George Lucas expected better. They note that the decline of Cinerama coincided roughly with its replacement by a simpler, cheaper, technically inferior version, and view DMR with alarm. IMAX originally reserved the phrase "the IMAX experience" for true 70 mm productions, but now allows its use on DMR productions as well.

After The Lion King in 2003, no Hollywood studio engaged in re-releasing and restoring classic films through the IMAX DMR process until 2012 although ongoing conversion of new releases continued and continued to grow in number. James Cameron's Titanic underwent both 3D conversion and DMR conversion to 3D in 2012 as did Men in Black 3. In August 2012, IMAX and Paramount Pictures announced a one-week exclusive re-release of Raiders of the Lost Ark on September 7, 2012, to promote the release of the Blu-ray collection. The film, before it underwent DMR, was already restored in a 4K digital intermediate with 7.1 surround sound from the original negative. The process for IMAX theaters, like with the complete restoration, was supervised by Steven Spielberg and sound designer Ben Burtt. "I didn't know if the 1981 print would stand up to a full IMAX transfer, so I came expecting a sort of grainy, muddy, and overly enlarged representation of the movie I had made years ago", Spielberg said. "I was blown away by the fact that it looked better than the movie I had made years ago."

=== Feature films ===
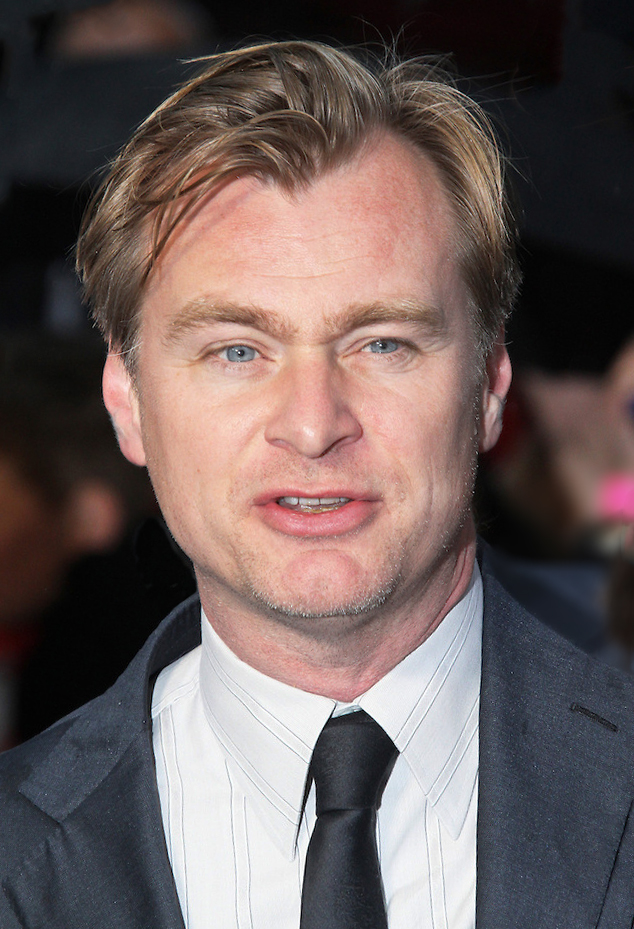
Christopher Nolan has been a vocal supporter of the IMAX 70 mm film format, and has collaborated with the company since the mid-2000s.

==== Feature films shot on IMAX 70 mm film ====
Prior to 2026, no full-length feature film had been shot entirely using IMAX 15/70 mm film cameras due to the technical difficulties associated with the format's older camera models: The cameras were considerably larger and heavier than standard cameras, and the noise they produced made dialogue recording difficult. The 15/70 cameras also had short film loads, ranging from 30 seconds to two minutes, while the cost of the 15 perforation 70 mm film film stock was significantly higher than standard 35 mm movie film.

The first major feature film to use IMAX cameras was Christopher Nolan's The Dark Knight (2008), which featured six sequences, totalling 28 minutes, shot using IMAX, that according to the film's press notes, it was the "first time ever that a major feature film has been even partially shot using IMAX cameras". Nolan previously tested the viability of IMAX cameras for visual effects and 35 mm reduction prints by filming a singe visual effects shot in his preceding film The Prestige (2006) in the format. Nolan had wanted to shoot a film in the IMAX format, and he also used it for quiet scenes that it would make pictorially interesting. Nolan said that he wished that it were possible to shoot the entire film in IMAX: "if you could take an IMAX camera to Mount Everest or outer space, you could use it in a feature movie." Nolan chose to edit some of the IMAX sequences using the original camera negative to eliminate generation loss, while scenes that were digitally mastered were scanned and printed out at 8 thousand lines of horizontal resolution (8K). When the film opened in 94 IMAX venues in 2008, all of them were sold out for the opening weekend.

A year later, director Michael Bay was inspired by IMAX's use in The Dark Knight to feature big-screen sequences in Transformers: Revenge of the Fallen. The film's co-writer Roberto Orci suggested that the IMAX footage would be 3D, but Bay later said that considering himself an "old school" filmmaker, he found 3D gimmicky and added that shooting in IMAX was easier than using stereoscopic cameras. The IMAX version of the film, in the end, contained almost ten minutes of IMAX-filmed footage out of the two-and-a-half-hour film.

Two years later, Terrence Malick's The Tree of Life filmed select sequences using IMAX cameras, and often used natural light. The film used a mix of 35 mm film and standard 65 mm and the IMAX 15/70 mm format. The set of guidelines they fine-tuned for this film included an edict to achieve maximum resolution whenever possible. "We would have preferred to shoot the entire movie in IMAX," says the cinematographer of the film Emmanuel Lubezki. "When the 65 mm and IMAX scenes do appear in the movie, they give you a jolt. It's a feeling of enhancement and majesty. It's almost as if someone cleaned off the window you were looking through". However the film was not screened on any IMAX screen.

After The Tree of Life, Brad Bird's Mission: Impossible – Ghost Protocol included 25 minutes of footage shot using IMAX cameras. Bird believed that using IMAX format would bring back "a level of showmanship" to the presentation of Hollywood films, which he believes the industry has lost due to its emphasis on screening films in multiplexes as opposed to grand theaters, and vetoing "first runs" in favor of wider initial releases. He also added that the IMAX format offered the viewer more immersion than digital 3D due to its brighter, higher quality image, which is projected on a larger screen, without the need for specialized 3D glasses. Ghost Protocol opened on December 16, 2011, in almost 500 IMAX venues worldwide a week before its wide release where it earned third place in the box office and $12 million.

As with The Dark Knight, Christopher Nolan decided to film sequences of the sequel, The Dark Knight Rises, in 15/70 IMAX. Nolan elected not to film in 3D and stated that he intends to focus on improving image quality and scale using the IMAX format. In a then-Hollywood record, The Dark Knight Rises featured 72 minutes of footage shot in 70 mm IMAX, the most ever for a feature film at the time at roughly 2.5 times that of The Dark Knight's 28 minutes. However due to the considerable noise IMAX cameras made, standard 35 mm cameras were still used to shoot dialogue scenes, as dialogue needed to be dubbed in scenes shot with IMAX cameras. Chairman and president of the IMAX Corporation, Greg Foster, stated that IMAX plans to run the film in its theaters for two months, despite only being contractually committed to run the film for two weeks in some theaters.

Between 2013 and 2014, J. J. Abrams's Star Trek Into Darkness, Francis Lawrence's The Hunger Games: Catching Fire, Luc Besson's Lucy, and Christopher Nolan's Interstellar were films that had sequences filmed with 15/70 IMAX cameras. On July 9, 2014, Bad Robot (J. J. Abrams's production company) confirmed via a picture uploaded to Twitter that one sequence in Disney and Lucasfilm's Star Wars: The Force Awakens would be captured with the IMAX 15/70 perf film cameras, in addition to the standard 35 mm film cameras that Abrams and his cinematographer Dan Mindel have employed for shooting the movie. The next installment in the franchise Rian Johnson's Star Wars: The Last Jedi, released in December 2017, also included sequences shot with 15/70 IMAX cameras. Adele's music video "Hello", released in 2015, became the first music video that was partially filmed with IMAX cameras.

From 2016 and 2021, films with sequences filmed with IMAX 70 mm film cameras included Zack Snyder's Batman v Superman: Dawn of Justice, Damien Chazelle's First Man, Patty Jenkins' Wonder Woman 1984 and Cary Joji Fukunaga's No Time to Die. Christopher Nolan used 15/70 IMAX cameras again on his next film, Dunkirk. However, unlike the previous films, where he used the cameras for select sequences, Nolan used IMAX as the primary shooting format, with 75% (about 79 minutes) of the 106-minute film featuring footage shot in 70 mm IMAX, breaking the aforementioned record that a previous Nolan film, The Dark Knight Rises, held. This was possible due to the sparsity of dialogue in the film: non verbal sequences were filmed in 15/70 mm IMAX cameras, while dialogue-heavy scenes were shot with regular 70 mm film cameras from Panavision. IMAX cameras were also used hand-held for the first time, as Nolan was advised by both Steven Spielberg and Ron Howard that it was the best way to shoot on water vessels. Dunkirk received the widest release on 70 mm IMAX since his last film, Interstellar, with the film being released on the format in 37 theaters around the world. The director's 2020 film, Tenet filmed 76 minutes with 15/70 mm IMAX cameras, the rest of the film was shot with regular 70 mm film cameras from Panavision. The film's six-minute opening sequence was shown before IMAX screenings of Star Wars: The Rise of Skywalker. Tenet was shown over 13 theaters globally in 70 mm IMAX. Jordan Peele's 2022 film Nope was filmed with the current generation of 15/70 IMAX cameras and Kodak 65 mm film, as was 30 minutes of 137 minutes of the 2025 film Sinners, directed by Ryan Coogler, was shot with IMAX MSM 9802 camera using 65 mm film stock. Nolan's Oppenheimer was also filmed with the current generation of 15/70 IMAX cameras and Kodak 65 mm film, but was also the first film to shoot sections in IMAX black and white analog photography.

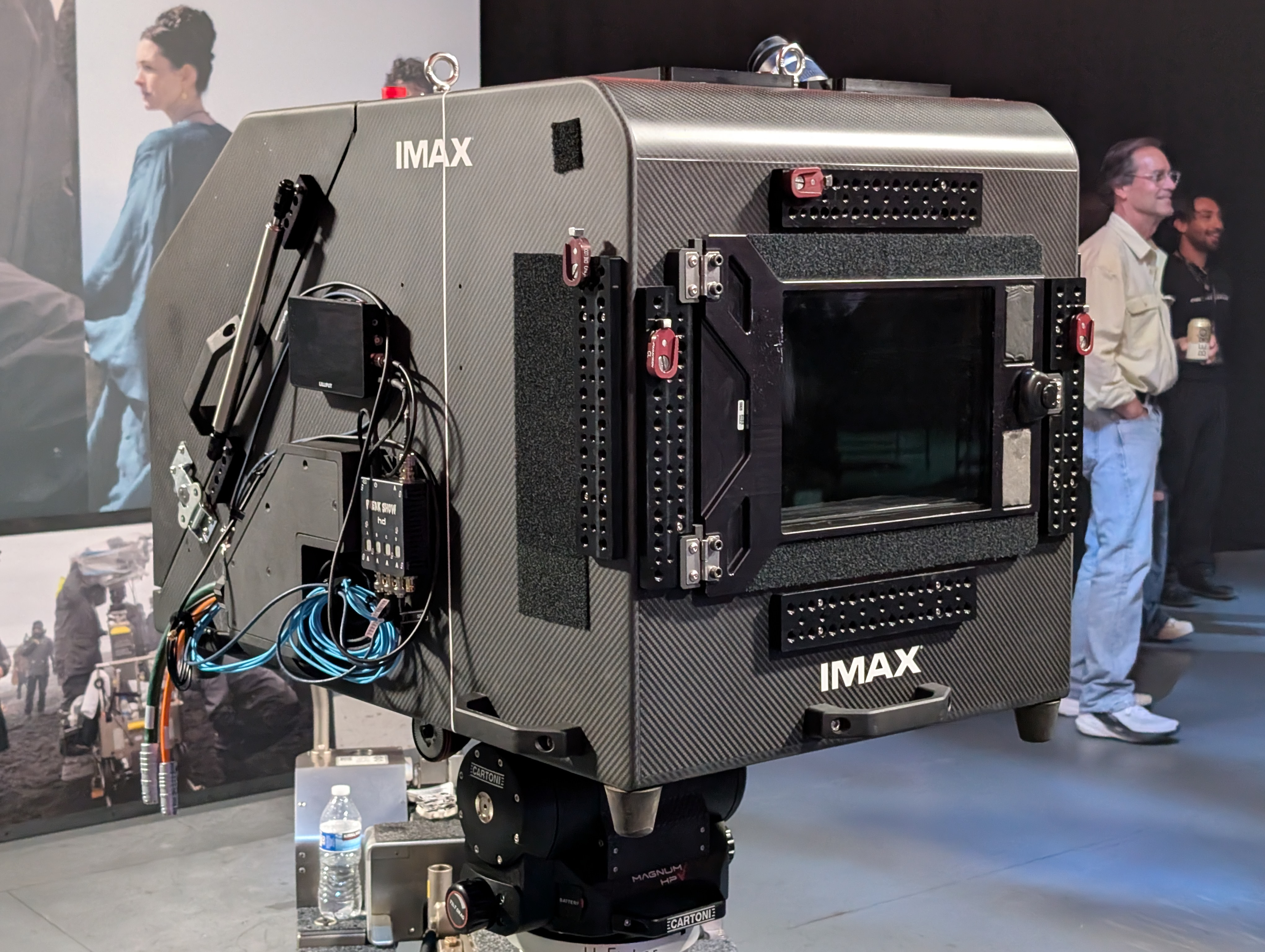
The Odyssey (2026) was able to be the first feature film shot entirely on IMAX 70 mm film cameras, due to the invention of a soundproof blimp (pictured) as well as the 30% quieter Keighley series of IMAX cameras.

In March 2022, IMAX planned to develop new 15/70 cameras that would be created with input from filmmakers such as Jordan Peele and Christopher Nolan. The work will be done in collaboration with Kodak, camera maker Panavision, and post-production company and film lab FotoKem. The large format company is also consulting with leading cinematographers including Linus Sandgren (No Time to Die), Rachel Morrison (Black Panther), Bradford Young (Arrival), Dan Mindel (Star Trek) and Nolan's go-to DP, Hoyte van Hoytema. IMAX intended to add at least four new 15/70 cameras to its offering over the next two years, with the first new camera expected to be put into use by late 2023. This was the Keighley series of carbon fibre and titanium bodied cameras, resulting cameras that were lighter and 30% quieter than previous models. These new cameras were first used to film Nolan's The Odyssey, shot over 91 days between February 25 and August 5, 2025, and released in cinemas in July 2026, which was the first full length feature to be entirely filmed in the IMAX format and was projected in IMAX 70 mm in 41 theatres worldwide. To keep the camera noise from being too distracting during dialogue scenes, IMAX engineered a camera sound blimp that encased the entire camera, with the rig and the camera together weighing over 300 pounds. In August 2026, global IMAX ticket sales for The Odyssey surpassed $400 million, making it the first film to exceed $400 million in IMAX box-office revenue. IMAX screenings accounted for nearly 30% of the film's worldwide box-office sales despite IMAX screens representing less than 1% of movie screens worldwide.

In 2026, Tyler Shields directed Chapter 51, a comedic thriller which was the first film to be partially filmed with IMAX 70 mm cameras equipped with custom designed anamorphic lenses.

==== Films shot using IMAX certified digital cameras ====
Michael Bay returned to IMAX for the fourth film in the Transformers series, Age of Extinction, in 2014. It was the first feature film shot using digital IMAX 3D cameras. He again used IMAX 3D cameras while shooting the fifth film, Transformers: The Last Knight, filming 98% of the film with 2 Alexa/IMAX cameras attached together to a special mount.

In April 2015, Marvel Studios announced that Russo brothers' Captain America: Civil War would be the first film to use the new Arri Alexa IMAX 2D digital camera, which was used to shoot approximately 15 minutes of the film. In May 2015, the Russo brothers announced that their films Avengers: Infinity War and Avengers: Endgame, released in 2018 and 2019, would be the first Hollywood feature films shot entirely in IMAX, albeit using Arri Alexa IMAX cameras instead of 15/70 perf film. Rihanna's music video "Sledgehammer", released in 2016, was the second music video to use the new Arri Alexa IMAX camera.

Clint Eastwood's Sully was filmed with Arri Alexa IMAX cameras for almost the entire film, and Jon Favreau's The Lion King used the cameras for select sequences. Five Chinese titles have been captured with IMAX digital cameras (including two with IMAX-certified cameras); selected scenes in Jiang Wen's Gone with the Bullets in 2014, the entirety of Guan Hu's The Eight Hundred in 2020, almost all of Chen Sicheng's Detective Chinatown 3 in 2021 and the entirety of Chen Kaige, Tsui Hark and Dante Lam's The Battle at Lake Changjin and The Battle at Lake Changjin II with IMAX-certified Red Ranger Monstro cameras in 2020 and 2022.

In September 2020, IMAX announced a new program called 'Filmed for IMAX', a brand new collaboration with camera manufacturers to meet filmmaker demand for the format. Through the program, IMAX will certify digital cameras with brands including Arri Alexa, Panavision, Red Digital Cinema, and Sony to work in the IMAX format when paired with its post-production process. The new program certifies the Arri Alexa LF and Mini LF, Panavision Millennium DXL2, Red Ranger Monstro and Komodo and Sony's CineAlta Venice cameras along with the Arri Alexa IMAX camera previously announced with Arri Rental. As part of the program, IMAX will also certify independent camera rental houses that can supply certified cameras worldwide, starting with Panavision, Arri and Keslow Camera. IMAX will select only a limited number of films to participate in the program each year. James Gunn's The Suicide Squad (shot with the Red Ranger Monstro and Komodo), Colin Tilley's If I Can't Have Love, I Want Power (shot with the Arri Alexa IMAX), Destin Daniel Cretton's Shang-Chi and the Legend of the Ten Rings, Denis Villeneuve's Dune, Chloé Zhao's Eternals (all three titles shot with the Arri Alexa LF and Mini LF) and Joseph Kosinski's Top Gun: Maverick (shot with the Sony CineAlta Venice) are among the first releases certified as 'Filmed for IMAX' through the new program.

In April 2022, it was announced that the 2022 Pixar animated film Lightyear had created a virtual IMAX camera in its production and was the first 'animated' film to capture with it. "We created a virtual IMAX camera with 1.43:1 aspect ratio and developed a pipeline to allow us to simultaneously shoot the film for IMAX, and then crop down for our standard 2.39:1 format," Jane Yen, Lightyear visual effects supervisor, revealed during a press conference. One of the two directors of photography, Jeremy Lasky, later said "I think this is the first that has been made for IMAX in this way. There's about a third of the film that was shot for IMAX. And the easy answer is that we have a set of lenses. And when I say lenses, I mean CGI made". A set of lenses that recreate the look of an anamorphic lens, which is your typical widescreen. You'll notice things out of focus in the background instead of being round are like stretched a little bit. There's like that blue lens flare that you see. It's anamorphic lenses where the way to shoot widescreen in the sixties, seventies, and then later got phased out a little bit, but they're still used today. But those visual effects call to a period of sci-fi that we were looking at, which is why those same lenses or versions of those lenses were used on WALL-E. Later he recommended "So for the 30 or so minutes of the movie in IMAX, we shot with those lenses opened up to the 1.43 aspect ratio and composed for that while keeping the composition as clear and as solid for a 2.39:1 crop from the center. So the widescreen image is pulled out of the IMAX image. Which all sounds really technical, but all it really means is, when you're watching it an IMAX screen, we were thinking about those scenes as IMAX. And it wasn't just some after the film was done, blow up of the movie".

In December 2022, it was announced that IMAX had certified the Red V-Raptor as a new certified camera and that James Gunn's Guardians of the Galaxy Vol. 3 would be the first film to shoot with the cameras instead of the Red Ranger Monstro. Other films between 2022 and 2024 that are captured with IMAX-certified cameras are Sam Raimi's Doctor Strange in the Multiverse of Madness (shot with the Panavision Millennium DXL2), Taika Waititi's Thor: Love and Thunder (shot with Arri Alexa LF and Mini LF), Ryan Coogler's Black Panther: Wakanda Forever (shot with the Sony CineAlta Venice), Peyton Reed's Ant-Man and the Wasp: Quantumania (shot with the Arri Alexa LF and Mini LF), Michael B. Jordan's Creed III (shot with the Sony CineAlta Venice), James Wan's Aquaman and the Lost Kingdom (shot with the Panavision Millennium DXL2), James Gunn's Guardians of the Galaxy Vol. 3 (shot with the Red V-Raptor), Christopher McQuarrie's Mission: Impossible – Dead Reckoning Part One (shot with Arri Alexa LF, Mini LF and Sony CineAlta Venice), Nia DaCosta's The Marvels (shot with the Arri Alexa LF and Mini LF), Ángel Manuel Soto's Blue Beetle, Denis Villeneuve's Dune: Part Two (shot with Arri Alexa LF and Mini LF).

=== In space exploration ===
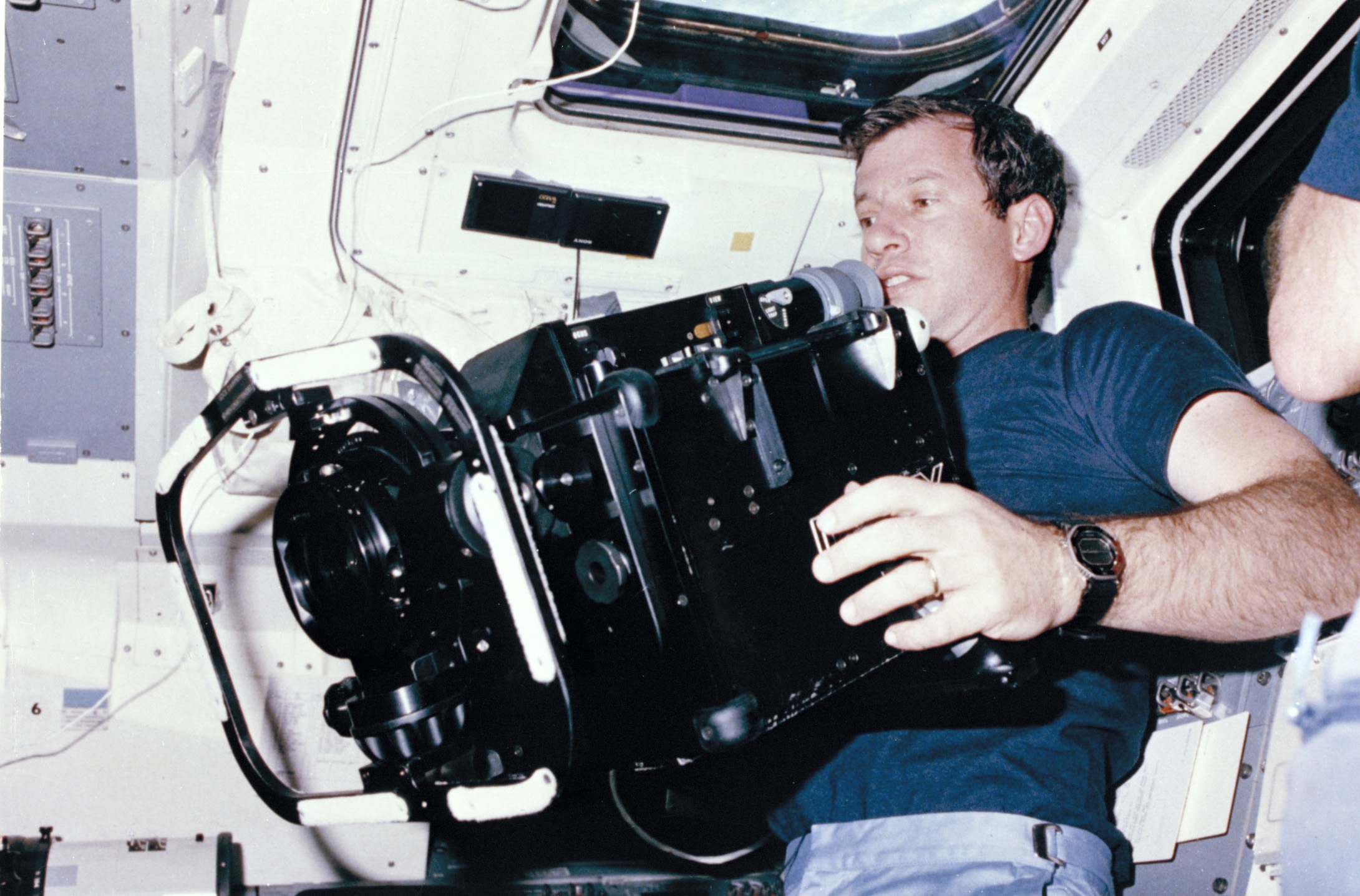
STS 41-C mission specialist Terry J. Hart holds a 70-pound IMAX camera in the mid-deck of the space shuttle Challenger in 1984.

IMAX cameras have flown in space on 17 occasions, NASA astronauts have used handheld IMAX cameras to document missions, and an IMAX camera has also been mounted in the payload bay of the Shuttle. Space shuttle mission STS-41-C filmed the deployment of the LDEF (Long duration exposure facility) and the repair of the Solar Max satellite. This footage was included in the 1985 IMAX movie The Dream Is Alive. Kennedy Space Center in Florida has two IMAX 3D theaters. These show space movies, including footage shot on missions and narrated by celebrities. Two of the IMAX cameras used by NASA are now on display at the National Air and Space Museum in Washington, D.C..

== Awards ==
In 1996, IMAX was awarded the Oscar for Scientific and Technical Achievement by the Academy of Motion Picture Arts and Sciences. The award cited IMAX's innovations in creating and developing a method of filming and exhibiting large-format, wide-angle motion pictures.

To date, ten native-format IMAX films have received Academy Awards nomination, with one winner. While on technical aspects and the usage of the IMAX system, only Hoyte van Hoytema's cinematography on Oppenheimer and Autumn Durald Arkapaw's cinematography on Sinners have won, while Wally Pfister's cinematography on The Dark Knight and Hoytema's cinematography on Dunkirk have also earned nominations.

- The Eruption of Mount St. Helens!, 1980 Documentary Short Subject
- Fires of Kuwait, 1992 Documentary Feature
- The Living Sea, 1995 Documentary Short Subject
- Special Effects: Anything Can Happen, 1996 Documentary Short Subject
- Cosmic Voyage, 1996 Documentary Short Subject
- Amazon, 1997 Documentary Short Subject
- Alaska: Spirit of the Wild, 1997 Documentary Short Subject
- More, 1998 Animated Short Film
- The Old Man and the Sea, 1999 Animated Short Film (winner)
- Dolphins, 2000 Documentary Short Subject

== Other uses ==
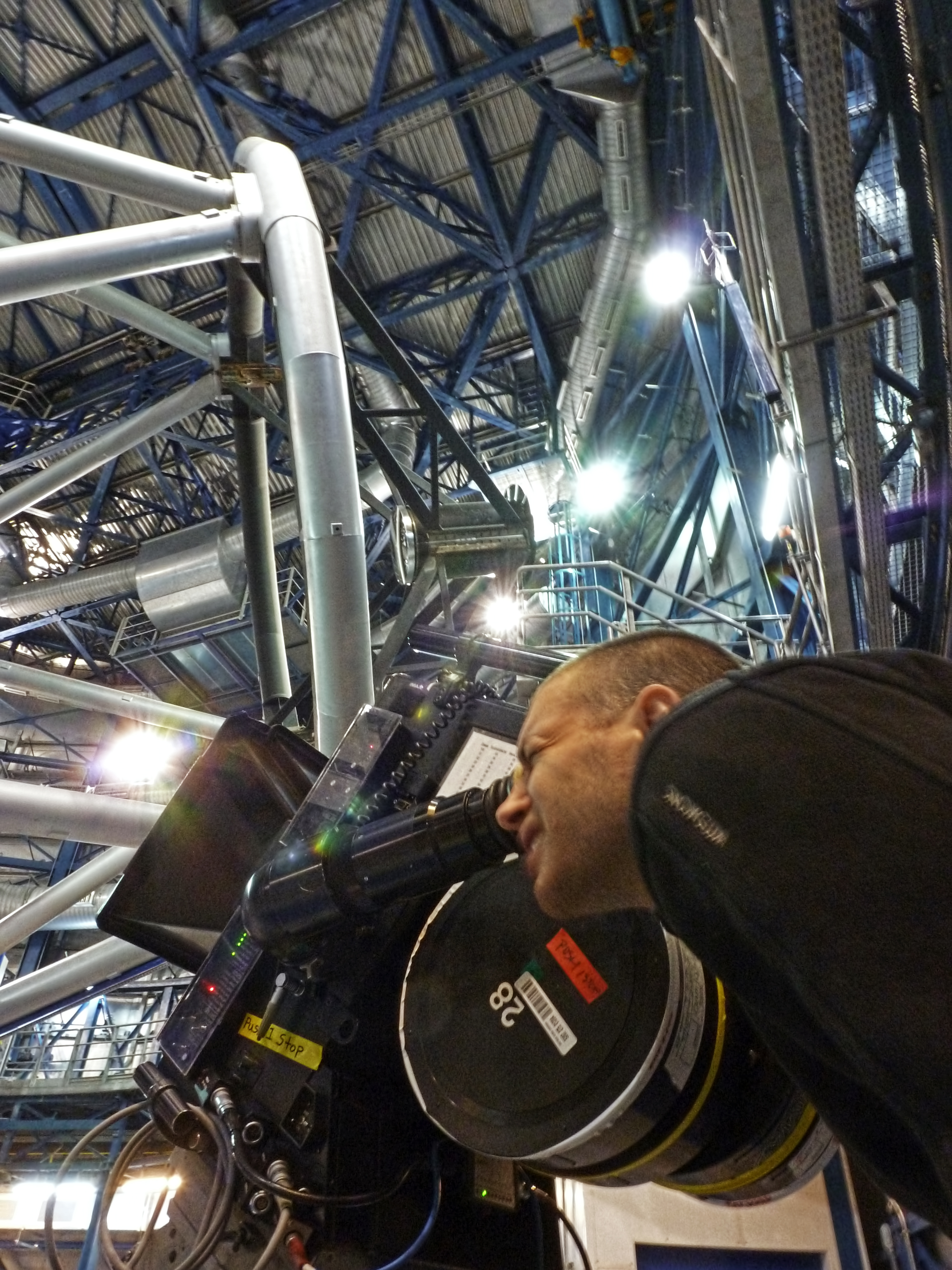
IMAX Filming at Paranal Observatory

Many IMAX films have been remastered into HDTV format (cropped to fit into HDTV's 16:9 aspect ratio) for the MOJO HD, HDNet and HD Theatre networks and release on DVD and Blu-ray Disc. In July 2005, the BFI IMAX Cinema in London became the first to host live music concerts, using a digital non-IMAX projector. The Science Museum London and BFI IMAX Cinema have also hosted computer game tournaments using digital projectors. Several amusement park attractions have integrated IMAX film segments, including Back to the Future: The Ride formerly at Universal Studios in Florida and California, Horizons formerly at Epcot and Soarin’ Over California at Disney California Adventure and Epcot.

== Technical specifications ==
IMAX (15/70)

- spherical lenses
- 70 mm film, 15 perforations per frame
- horizontal rolling loop movement, from right to left (viewed from the emulsion side)
- 24 frames per second
- camera aperture: 70.41 mm × 52.63 mm (2.772 in × 2.072 in)
- projection aperture: at least 2 mm (0.079 in) less than camera aperture on the vertical axis and at least 0.41 mm (0.016 in) less on the horizontal axis
- aspect ratio: 1.43:1
- DMR aspect ratio: 1.90:1, 2.39:1

IMAX Dome/Omnimax

Same as IMAX with the addition of:

- fisheye lenses
- lens optically centered 9.4 mm (0.37 in) below film horizontal center line
- projected elliptically on a dome screen, 20° below and 110° above perfectly centered viewers

== Competitors ==
In late 2014, Dolby announced Dolby Cinema as an IMAX competitor with super-vivid image mainly in High Dynamic Range with shadow. In Australia and New Zealand, Event Cinemas sells a premium cinema experience with a bigger screen, improved imagery and better seats marketed as Vmax. In the United States, Cinemark has its Cinemark XD: Extreme Digital Cinema.

== See also ==
- List of films released in IMAX
- List of IMAX films
- List of IMAX-based rides
- China Film Giant Screen, a similar format developed to break IMAX's large-screen monopoly in China
