= Micky Erbe =

Canadian composer (1946–2021)

Micky Erbe (June 1, 1946 – April 11, 2021) was a Canadian film and television composer, who was a partner with his wife Maribeth Solomon in the music studio Mickymar Productions.

Erbe and Solomon received three Genie Award nominations for Best Original Score as a duo, with nods at the 3rd Genie Awards in 1982 for Ticket to Heaven, the 4th Genie Awards in 1983 for Threshold, and the 10th Genie Awards in 1989 for Milk and Honey.

They were four-time Gemini Award winners for their work in television, winning at the 3rd Gemini Awards in 1988 for Adderly, the 4th Gemini Awards in 1989 for The Struggle for Democracy, the 7th Gemini Awards in 1993 for Street Legal, and the 13th Gemini Awards in 1998 for Earth: Final Conflict. They were also nominated at the 9th Gemini Awards in 1995 for E.N.G., at the 10th Gemini Awards in 1996 for the Street Legal finale film Last Rights, and at the 15th Gemini Awards in 2000 for Earth: Final Conflict.

With Jackie Rae and Laurie Bower, he was a cofounder of The Spitfire Band, a jazz band active in the 1980s.
