= List of IMAX films =

Movies shot with IMAX cameras

Filming of Hidden Universe 3D using an IMAX 70mm camera

This is a list of films shot partially or in full with IMAX cameras, either on 15/70 film, with the Phantom 65 IMAX 3D, with the ARRI Alexa IMAX, with other IMAX-certified digital cameras or IMAX Live Events shot with IMAX-certified cameras.

The US premiere dates are displayed where available. Due to the ease of downconverting, most IMAX 3D films have also been remastered and exhibited in 2D, with an appropriate name change (for example Space Station 3D becomes Space Station).

== Films shot entirely with IMAX 70mm cameras ==
| Title | Release date | Format | Cameras & Information |
|---|---|---|---|
| Tiger Child | 1970 Mar 15 | | |
| North of Superior | 1971 May 22 | | |
| Garden Isle | 1973 Aug | OMNIMAX | First OMNIMAX film. |
| Capture the Sun | 1973 | OMNIMAX | |
| Catch the Sun | 1973 | | |
| Volcano | 1973 | | |
| Voyage to the Outer Planets | 1973 | OMNIMAX | |
| Standing Up Country | 1973 | OMNIMAX | |
| Man Belongs to Earth | 1974 May 4 | | Expo '74 |
| Circus World | 1974 May | | |
| Cosmos: The Universe of Loren Eiseley | 1974 Jun | OMNIMAX | Dynavision (8/70 negative, blown up to OMNIMAX). |
| Snow Job | 1974 | | |
| Energy | 1975 May 18 | | |
| Viva Baja | 1975 | OMNIMAX | |
| To Fly! | 1976 Jul 01 | | |
| Ontario: Summertide | 1976 | | |
| Rivers of North America | 1976 | OMNIMAX | |
| Ocean | 1977 | OMNIMAX | |
| Silent Sky | 1977 | | |
| Alfa 78 | 1978 | OMNIMAX | |
| Genesis | 1978 | OMNIMAX | |
| Living Planet | 1979 | | |
| Nomads of the Deep | 1979 | | |
| Atmos : Storm | 1980 | OMNIMAX | |
| The Eruption of Mount St. Helens! | 1980 May 18 | OMNIMAX | |
| My Strange Uncle | 1981 Nov 20 | | |
| An American Adventure | 1981 | | |
| The Great Barrier Reef | 1981 | OMNIMAX | |
| World Coaster | 1981 | | |
| Energy!, Energy! | 1982 May | | |
| Hail Columbia! | 1982 Jun 15 | OMNIMAX | |
| Tomorrow in Space | 1982 | OMNIMAX | |
| Flyers | 1982 | | |
| Omni News | 1982 | OMNIMAX | |
| Omnisphere | 1983 Oct 01 | | Ride film. Omnisphere portion of EPCOT Center's Horizon attraction. |
| Darwin on the Galapagos | 1983 | | |
| Huapango | 1983 | | |
| El Pueblo del Sol (The People of the Sun) | 1983 | | |
| Behold Hawaii | 1983 Apr | | |
| Journey of Discovery | 1984 | | |
| Faces of Japan | 1984 | | |
| Dance of Life : Indonesia Indah I | 1984 | | |
| River Journey : Au fil de l'eau | 1984 May 12 | | Louisiana World Exhibition. |
| Speed | 1984 | | |
| Grand Canyon: The Hidden Secrets | 1984 Jun 16 | | |
| The Magic Egg | 1984 Dec | | |
| Skyward | 1985 Mar 17 | | Expo 85 in Tsukuba, Japan. |
| Picture Holland | 1985 | | |
| Chronos | 1985 Jan 01 | | |
| A Freedom to Move | 1985 Apr 05 | OMNIMAX | |
| The Dream Is Alive | 1985 Jun 01 | OMNIMAX | |
| We Are Born of Stars | 1985 | OMNIMAX 3D | First IMAX 3D film. Anaglyph 3D. |
| Omni-news II | 1985 | OMNIMAX | |
| Water and Man (L'eau et les hommes) | 1985 Dec 12 | OMNIMAX | |
| Dance of the East | 1986 | | |
| Sacred Site : Night of the Comet | 1986 | | |
| Transitions | 1986 May 2 | 3D | First full-colour IMAX 3D film |
| Making Transitions | 1986 | | |
| Niagara: Miracles, Myths, and Magic | 1986 Jun 21 | | |
| On the Wing | 1986 Jun 27 | | |
| Seasons | 1987 Jun 11 | | |
| Heart Land | 1987 Jun 18 | | |
| Island Child : Indonesia Indah II | 1987 | | |
| New England Time Capsule | 1987 | OMNIMAX | signature film for Museum of Science Boston OMNIMAX |
| Weaving Ants : Les fourmis tisserandes | 1987 | | |
| Time Concerto | 1987 | | |
| Alamo: The Price of Freedom | 1988 Mar 05 | | |
| Primiti Too Taa | 1988 Aug 01 | | |
| Beavers | 1988 | | |
| Emergency : Urgence | 1988 | | |
| The Philadelphia Anthem | 1988 | | signature film for Franklin Institute |
| From a Little World | 1989 Mar 25 | | Produced for the Kanagawa Prefecture Pavilion IMAX Theatre, Yokohama Exotic Showcase '89. |
| Hydro | 1989 | | |
| To the Limit | 1989 Apr 01 | | |
| Deepest Garden : Le benthos: ou la terre sous-marine | 1989 Jun 24 | | |
| Race the Wind | 1989 Jul 10 | | |
| Sea Fantasy | 1989 | | Expo '89. |
| Only the Earth | 1989 | | |
| J'écris dans l'espace (I Write in Space) | 1989 | IMAX DOME | Produced for the bicentennial of the French Revolution. |
| The First Emperor of China | 1990 Jan 05 | | |
| Echoes of the Sun | 1990 Apr 01 | IMAX DOME 3D | IMAX Solido. Expo '90, Osaka, Japan. First film produced in IMAX DOME 3D. |
| Creatures of the Seasons | 1990 | | |
| Flowers in the Sky | 1990 Apr 01 | IMAX Magic Carpet | Expo '90. |
| The Flying Raft | 1990 Apr 01 | | Sankin-Kai Heartopia Pavilion at Expo '90 in Osaka, Japan. |
| The Last Buffalo | 1990 Apr 01 | 3-D | Suntory Pavilion at Expo '90 in Osaka, Japan. |
| Blue Planet | 1990 Jul 13 | | |
| The Country Bears Down Under | 1990 Dec 25 | | |
| Ring of Fire | 1991 Jan 19 | | |
| Antarctica | 1991 Oct 18 | | |
| Rolling Stones: Live at the MAX | 1991 Oct 25 | | |
| Homeland | 1991 | IMAX DOME | for Singapore Science Center. |
| Black Widow | 1991 | | |
| Praying Mantis | 1991 | | |
| Emeralds of the Sea : Indonesia Indah III | 1991 | | |
| Switzerland | 1991 | | |
| Polynesian Odyssey | 1991 | | |
| Light & Life | 1991 | | |
| Taiwan : Baodao Caifenglu : The Many Faces of Taiwan | 1992 | | |
| Tropical Rainforest | 1992 Feb 01 | | |
| Mountain Gorilla | 1992 Mar 26 | | |
| Momentum | 1992 Apr 20 | | First IMAX HD film. |
| Fires of Kuwait | 1992 Jun 09 | | |
| Titanica | 1992 Oct 12 | | long 95-minute version. Short version 1995. |
| At Sea | 1992 | | 5/70 presented exclusively at the Burke Theater at the US Navy Memorial in Washington, DC. |
| To Be an Astronaut | 1992 | | |
| Top Chrono | 1992 | | |
| Hidden Hawaii | 1993 | | |
| Welcome to the MAX | 1993 Jan 23 | | Liberty Science Center signature film |
| In Search of the Obelisk | 1993 Jul 31 | IMAX Ridefilm | First IMAX Ridefilm (VistaVision 48 fps). First part of a three part interactive show at Luxor Resort and Casino in Las Vegas, Nevada. |
| Breaking Through : Imagine! 3D | 1993 Aug 07 | 3-D | Expo 93 in Taejon, Korea. |
| The Discoverers | 1993 Oct 01 | | Expanded version of Eureka! (1992). |
| The Secret of Life on Earth | 1993 Oct 14 | | |
| Journey to the Planets | 1993 | | |
| Flight of the Aquanaut | 1993 | | |
| Reach for the Sky | 1993 | | |
| Lost Animals | 1993 | | |
| Yampa: The Untamed River | 1993 | | Denver Museum of Natural History signature film |
| Neighbors | 1994 | | Ozarks Discovery IMAX Theater signature film |
| Beautiful Indonesia : Indonesia Indah IV | 1994 | | |
| Endless Summer: The Ride | 1994 | | |
| Viva la Blanca Paloma | 1994 | | Shima Spain Village at Mie, Japan |
| Destiny in Space | 1994 Jan 17 | | |
| Africa: The Serengeti | 1994 Apr 08 | | |
| Yellowstone | 1994 Jun 15 | | |
| Asteroid Adventure | 1994 Jun 20 | IMAX Ridefilm | 48fps OMNIMAX/IMAX HD ride film |
| Into the Deep | 1994 Nov 03 | 3-D | |
| The Journey Inside | 1995 | | |
| Fun House Express | 1995 | | |
| Mystery of the Maya | 1995 | | |
| Search for the Great Sharks | 1995 | | |
| The Living Sea | 1995 Feb | | |
| Titanica | 1995 Apr 04 | | 40-minute version. 95-minute version released 1992 Oct 12 |
| Wings of Courage | 1995 Apr 21 | 3-D | First narrative short film to be filmed in IMAX 70mm. |
| Ozarks: Legacy & Legend : The Fiddle: An American Family Saga | 1995 Apr 28 | | |
| Stormchasers | 1995 Oct 01 | | |
| The Great American West | 1995 Oct 22 | | |
| Across the Sea of Time | 1995 Oct 25 | 3-D | |
| Valencia, Spain | 1995 | | |
| The Story of Winds | 1995 | | |
| Cities of the Wild | 1996 | | |
| Crashendo | 1996 | | |
| Making Momentum | 1996 | | |
| Mexico | 1996 Mar 09 | Iwerks | |
| Survival Island: The Animal Cities of South Georgia | 1996 Jun 11 | | |
| Zion Canyon: Treasure of the Gods | 1996 | | |
| Special Effects: Anything Can Happen | 1996 Jul 04 | | |
| Cosmic Voyage | 1996 Aug 08 | | |
| Hearst Castle: Building the Dream | 1996 Aug 17 | 870 | |
| L5: First City in Space | 11 October 1996 | 3-D | |
| Whales: An Unforgettable Journey | 1996 Nov 01 | | |
| Reunion Magique : Island Adventure | 1996 | | |
| Dallas: A Unique Place in Time | 1996 | | |
| Imagine Indiana | 1996 | | |
| Urushi: The Japanese Beauty | 1996 | | |
| Pilialoha | 1996 | 870 | |
| Ocean | 1997 | | |
| On the Wing | 1997 | | |
| Super Speedway | 1997 Feb 01 | | |
| Mission to Mir | 1997 Mar 01 | | |
| The Magic of Flight | 1997 Mar 01 | | |
| Alaska: Spirit of the Wild | 1997 Apr 11 | | |
| Amazon | 1997 Apr 28 | | |
| Thrill Ride: The Science of Fun | 1997 May 01 | | |
| Four Million Houseguests : The Hidden Dimension | 1997 May 09 | 3-D | |
| Symphony Philadelphia | 1997 May 14 | | signature film |
| The IMAX Nutcracker | 1997 Nov 23 | 3-D | |
| Race for Atlantis | 1998 Jan 15 | IMAX Ridefilm | 3-D 48fps ride film at Caesars Palace, Las Vegas |
| Shinsyu Symphony | 1998 | | |
| The Way to B | 1998 | | |
| Passion for Life | 1998 | | Ciudad de las Artes y las Ciencias signature film |
| The Greatest Places | 1998 Feb 07 | | |
| Everest | 1998 Mar 06 | | |
| Africa's Elephant Kingdom | 1998 May 01 | | |
| Mark Twain's America | 1998 May 01 | 3-D | |
| Mysteries of Egypt | 1998 Jun 02 | | |
| T-Rex: Back to the Cretaceous | 1998 Oct 23 | 3-D | |
| Olympic Glory | 1999 Jan 22 | | |
| Hemingway: A Portrait | 1999 | | |
| Wolves | 1999 Mar 01 | | |
| Extreme | 1999 Mar 12 | | |
| La Patrouille de France (The France Patrol) | 1999 Apr 01 | | |
| The Spirit of Silicon Valley | 1999 Apr 05 | | |
| Island of the Sharks | 1999 Apr 23 | | |
| The BFI London IMAX Signature Film : Monty Python: How Big Is Ny IMAX film? | 1999 May 01 | | signature film |
| East End | 1999 May 19 | | Super-8 enlarged to 15/70 |
| The Old Man and the Sea | 1999 Jun 18 | | |
| Gold Fever | 1999 Jun 19 | | |
| Wildfire: Feel the Heat | 1999 Jul 30 | | |
| Alien Adventure | 1999 Aug 17 | 3-D | |
| Sydney: A Story of a City | 1999 Aug 19 | | |
| Chang Jiang: The Great River of China | 1999 Aug 24 | | |
| Siegfried & Roy: The Magic Box | 1999 Sep 22 | 3-D | |
| Amazing Journeys | 1999 Oct 15 | | |
| Galapagos: The Enchanted Voyage | 1999 Oct 27 | 3-D | |
| Fifty | 1999 Oct 29 | | |
| Cirque du Soleil: Journey of Man | 1999 Dec 24 | 3-D | |
| SolarMax | 1 January 2000 | | |
| Ultimate G's | 17 February 2000 | 3D | |
| The Testaments | 24 March 2000 | | |
| Dolphins | 14 April 2000 | | |
| Adventures in Wild California | 3 May 2000 | | |
| Michael Jordan to the Max | 5 May 2000 | | |
| Pandorama | 19 May 2000 | | |
| Ocean Oasis | 13 September 2000 | | |
| Ski to the Max | 12 October 2000 | | |
| India on IMAX | 2001 | | |
| Celebrate Detroit! | 2001 | | |
| Bears | 1 January 2001 | | |
| Pittsburgh's Big Picture | 12 January 2001 | | |
| 'N Sync: Bigger Than Live | 2 February 2001 | | |
| Journey into Amazing Caves | 1 March 2001 | | |
| Lost Worlds: Life in the Balance | 14 April 2001 | | |
| Great North | 11 May 2001 | | |
| The Princess and the Pea | 19 May 2001 | | |
| China: The Panda Adventure | 9 June 2001 | | |
| Ocean Origins | 26 June 2001 | | |
| Ocean Men: Extreme Dive | 31 August 2001 | | |
| The Human Body | 14 October 2001 | | |
| The Trip | 2002 | | |
| Straight Up: Helicopters in Action | 1 January 2002 | | |
| In Five Minutes, The Feature | 10 February 2002 | | |
| Kilimanjaro: To the Roof of Africa | 8 March 2002 | | |
| Space Station 3D | 19 April 2002 | 3D | |
| Lewis & Clark: Great Journey West | 1 May 2002 | | |
| Ultimate X: The Movie | 6 May 2002 | | |
| Australia: Land Beyond Time | 25 May 2002 | | |
| Horses: The Story of Equus | 12 June 2002 | | |
| India: Kingdom of the Tiger | 14 June 2002 | | |
| Skydance, Rendezvous à Paris | 3 July 2002 | | |
| The Legend of Loch Lomond | 25 July 2002 | | |
| Pulse: A Stomp Odyssey | 11 October 2002 | | |
| Jane Goodall's Wild Chimpanzees | 25 October 2002 | | |
| Home of Freedom | 11 December 2002 | | |
| Coral Reef Adventure | 14 February 2003 | | |
| Top Speed | 18 April 2003 | | |
| Where the Trains Used to Go | 14 May 2003 | | |
| Country Music: The Spirit of America | 2 June 2003 | | |
| Bugs! A Rainforest Adventure | 25 July 2003 | 3D | |
| Stage Fright | 15 September 2003 | | |
| The Young Black Stallion | 25 December 2003 | | |
| Mystic India | 2004 | | |
| Forces of Nature | 2004 | | |
| Texas: The Big Picture | 1 January 2004 | | |
| Majestic White Horses | 14 January 2004 | | |
| NASCAR 3D: The IMAX Experience | 12 March 2004 | 3D | |
| Hubble: Galaxies Across Space and Time | 15 March 2004 | | |
| Voyageurs Du Ciel Et De La Mer | 3 April 2004 | | IMAX Magic Carpet |
| Sacred Planet | 22 April 2004 | | |
| Roar: Lions of the Kalahari | 1 May 2004 | | |
| Adventures in Animation 3D | 18 May 2004 | 3D | |
| Vikings: Journey to New Worlds | 10 September 2004 | | |
| Fighter Pilot: Operation Red Flag | 4 December 2004 | | |
| Mystery of the Nile | 18 February 2005 | | |
| Magnificent Desolation: Walking on the Moon 3D | 23 September 2005 | 3D | |
| Roving Mars | 27 January 2006 | | |
| Greece: Secrets of the Past | 17 February 2006 | | |
| Deep Sea 3D | 3 March 2006 | 3D | |
| Ride Around the World | 2 June 2006 | | |
| Hurricane on the Bayou | 22 December 2006 | | |
| Journey Across India | 2007 | | |
| Mummies 3D: Secrets of the Pharaohs | 16 March 2007 | 3D | |
| Dinosaurs: Giants of Patagonia | 5 April 2007 | 3D | |
| Sea Monsters: A Prehistoric Adventure | 5 October 2007 | 3D | |
| Grand Canyon Adventure: River at Risk | 12 March 2008 | 3D | |
| Mysteries of the Great Lakes | 5 May 2008 | | |
| Journey to Mecca | 7 January 2009 | | |
| Under the Sea | 7 February 2009 | 3D | |
| Van Gogh: Brush with Genius | 25 March 2009 | | |
| Hubble | 19 March 2010 | 3D | |
| Tornado Alley | 18 March 2011 | | |
| Rescue | 9 June 2011 | | |
| Rocky Mountain Express | 30 September 2011 | | |
| To the Arctic 3D | 20 April 2012 | 3D | |
| Hidden Universe 3D | 5 September 2013 | 3D | |
| Journey to the South Pacific | 27 November 2013 | 3D | |
| Island of Lemurs: Madagascar | 4 April 2014 | 3D | |
| National Parks Adventure | February 2016 | 3D | |
| Dream Big: Engineering Our World | 17 February 2017 | 3D | |
| America's Musical Journey | 16 February 2018 | 3D | |
| Into America’s Wild | 14 February 2020 | | |
| Deep Sky | 20 October 2023 | | |
| The Odyssey | 17 July 2026 | | First narrative feature film to be entirely shot in IMAX 70mm. |

== Films shot partially with IMAX 70mm cameras ==
| Title | Release date | Format | Cameras & Information |
|---|---|---|---|
| Fantasia 2000 | 1 January 2000 | | |
| Shackleton's Antarctic Adventure | 10 February 2001 | | |
| All Access: Front Row. Backstage. Live! | 20 May 2001 | | |
| Adrenaline Rush: The Science of Risk | 18 October 2002 | | |
| Santa vs. the Snowman 3D | 1 November 2002 | 3D | |
| Wired to Win | 1 January 2005 | | |
| The Prestige | 17 October 2006 | | Not screened in IMAX, used for single visual effects shot as a test. |
| The Alps | 9 March 2007 | | |
| Dinosaurs Alive! | 30 March 2007 | 3D | |
| Sea Monsters: A Prehistoric Adventure | 5 October 2007 | | |
| Wild Ocean | 18 March 2008 | 3D | |
| The Dark Knight | 14 July 2008 | | First narrative feature film to be shot in IMAX 70mm. |
| Transformers: Revenge of the Fallen | 24 June 2009 | | |
| Legends of Flight | 9 June 2010 | 3D | |
| Born to Be Wild | 8 April 2011 | 3D | |
| The Tree of Life | 27 May 2011 | | Not screened in IMAX theatres. |
| Mission: Impossible – Ghost Protocol | 16 December 2011 | | |
| The Dark Knight Rises | 16 July 2012 | | |
| Star Trek Into Darkness | 17 May 2013 | | Converted to 3D. Cropped to 1.66:1 |
| Jerusalem | 18 September 2013 | 3D | |
| The Hunger Games: Catching Fire | 22 November 2013 | | |
| Transformers: Age of Extinction | 27 June 2014 | 3D | IMAX 70mm as well as Phantom 65 IMAX 3D. |
| Lucy | 25 July 2014 | | Converted to 3D. Cropped to 2.39:1 |
| Interstellar | 5 November 2014 | | |
| Humpback Whales | 13 February 2015 | 3D | |
| Journey to Space | 13 February 2015 | 3D | Recycled footage from Space Station 3D |
| Hello | 23 October 2015 | | Music video |
| Star Wars: The Force Awakens | 18 December 2015 | | Converted to 3D. |
| Batman v Superman: Dawn of Justice | 25 March 2016 | | Converted to 3D. |
| Dunkirk | 21 July 2017 | | |
| Star Wars: The Last Jedi | 15 December 2017 | | Converted to 3D. Cropped to 2.39:1 |
| First Man | 12 October 2018 | | |
| Ancient Caves | 5 March 2020 | | Converted to 3D. |
| Tenet | 26 August 2020 | | |
| Wonder Woman 1984 | 16 December 2020 | | Converted to 3D. Cropped to 1.90:1 |
| No Time to Die | 30 September 2021 | | Converted to 3D. |
| Nope | 22 July 2022 | | |
| Oppenheimer | 21 July 2023 | | |
| Nokia | 1 April 2025 | | Music Video |
| Sinners | 18 April 2025 | | |
| The Smashing Machine | 3 October 2025 | | |
| Chapter 51 | 23 June 2026 | | First film shot using IMAX cameras with anamorphic lenses. |
| The Eyes of Ghana | 28 October 2026 | | |
| Dune: Part Three | 18 December 2026 | | |
| Black Panther III | 15 December 2028 | | First movie in MCU to be shot with IMAX 70mm |

== Films shot entirely with IMAX-certified digital cameras ==
| Title | Release date | Format | Cameras & Information |
|---|---|---|---|
| A Beautiful Planet | 29 April 2016 | 3D | Canon EOS 1D-C and Canon EOS C500. |
| Inhumans | 1 September 2017 | | ARRI Alexa IMAX. TV Series. First two episodes. |
| Pandas | 6 April 2018 | 3D | ARRI Alexa IMAX. |
| Avengers: Infinity War | 27 April 2018 | | ARRI Alexa IMAX. Converted to 3D. |
| Avengers: Endgame | 26 April 2019 | | ARRI Alexa IMAX. Converted to 3D. |
| The Eight Hundred | 21 August 2020 | | ARRI Alexa IMAX. |
| The Suicide Squad | 6 August 2021 | | RED Ranger Monstro and Komodo. |
| If I Can't Have Love, I Want Power | 25 August 2021 | | ARRI Alexa IMAX. |
| Shang-Chi and the Legend of the Ten Rings | 3 September 2021 | | ARRI Alexa LF and Mini LF. Converted to 3D. |
| Spider-Man: No Way Home | 17 December 2021 | | ARRI Alexa LF and Mini LF. Converted to 3D. |
| Doctor Strange in the Multiverse of Madness | 6 May 2022 | | Panavision Millennium DXL2. Converted to 3D. |
| Guardians of the Galaxy Vol. 3 | 5 May 2023 | | RED V-Raptor. Converted to 3D. |
| Gran Turismo | 25 August 2023 | | Sony CineAlta VENICE. Presented in 1.90:1. |
| Aquaman and the Lost Kingdom | 22 December 2023 | | Panavision Millennium DXL2. Converted to 3D. |
| Dune: Part Two | 1 March 2024 | | ARRI Alexa IMAX and Mini LF. |
| The Blue Angels | 17 May 2024 | | Sony CineAlta VENICE. |
| F1 | 27 June 2025 | | Sony CineAlta VENICE. |
| Superman | 11 July 2025 | | RED V-Raptor. Converted to 3D. |
| The Fantastic Four: First Steps | 25 July 2025 | | ARRI Alexa IMAX. Converted to 3D. |
| Varanasi | 7 April 2027 | | TBA. |
| Man of Tomorrow | 9 July 2027 | | TBA. |
| Miami Vice '85 | 19 May 2028 | | TBA. |

== Films shot partially with IMAX-certified digital cameras ==
| Title | Release date | Format | Cameras & Information |
|---|---|---|---|
| Born to Be Wild | 8 April 2011 | 3D | Phantom 65 IMAX 3D. |
| Transformers: Age of Extinction | 27 June 2014 | 3D | Phantom 65 IMAX 3D. |
| Gone with the Bullets | 18 December 2014 | 3D | Phantom 65 IMAX 3D. |
| Captain America: Civil War | 6 May 2016 | | ARRI Alexa IMAX. Converted to 3D. |
| Sully | 9 September 2016 | | ARRI Alexa IMAX. |
| Transformers: The Last Knight | 21 June 2017 | 3D | ARRI Alexa IMAX. |
| The Lion King | 19 July 2019 | 3D | ARRI Alexa IMAX. |
| Detective Chinatown 3 | 12 February 2021 | | ARRI Alexa IMAX. |
| Dune | 16 September 2021 | | ARRI Alexa LF and Mini LF. Converted to 3D. |
| Eternals | 5 November 2021 | | ARRI Alexa LF and Mini LF. Converted to 3D. |
| Top Gun: Maverick | 27 May 2022 | | Sony CineAlta VENICE. |
| Thor: Love and Thunder | 8 July 2022 | | ARRI Alexa LF and Mini LF. Converted to 3D. |
| Black Panther: Wakanda Forever | 11 November 2022 | | Sony CineAlta VENICE. Converted to 3D. |
| Ant-Man and the Wasp: Quantumania | 17 February 2023 | | Panavision Millennium DXL2. Converted to 3D. |
| Creed III | 3 March 2023 | | Sony CineAlta VENICE. |
| The Little Mermaid | 26 May 2023 | | ARRI Alexa IMAX and Mini LF. |
| Mission: Impossible – Dead Reckoning Part One | 12 July 2023 | | Sony CineAlta VENICE. Cropped to 2.39:1. |
| Blue Beetle | 18 August 2023 | | ARRI Alexa Mini LF. |
| The Marvels | 10 November 2023 | | ARRI Alexa IMAX and Mini LF. Converted to 3D. |
| The Hunger Games: The Ballad of Songbirds & Snakes | 17 November 2023 | | ARRI Alexa Mini LF. |
| Godzilla x Kong: The New Empire | 29 March 2024 | | ARRI Alexa LF and Mini LF. Converted to 3D. |
| Dancing Village: The Curse Begins | 11 April 2024 | | RED Ranger Monstro. |
| Joker: Folie à Deux | 4 October 2024 | | ARRI Alexa IMAX and Mini LF. |
| Venom: The Last Dance | 25 October 2024 | | ARRI Alexa Mini LF. Converted to 3D. |
| Captain America: Brave New World | 14 February 2025 | | ARRI Alexa Mini LF. Converted to 3D. |
| Thunderbolts* | 2 May 2025 | | ARRI Alexa Mini LF. Converted to 3D. |
| Final Destination Bloodlines | 16 May 2025 | | Sony CineAlta VENICE. |
| Mission: Impossible – The Final Reckoning | 23 May 2025 | | Sony CineAlta VENICE. |
| How to Train Your Dragon | 13 June 2025 | | ARRI Alexa LF and Mini LF. Converted to 3D. |
| Tron: Ares | 10 October 2025 | | RED V-Raptor. Converted to 3D. |
| Mercy | 23 January 2026 | | Sony CineAlta VENICE. Converted to 3D. |
| The Bride! | 6 March 2026 | | Sony CineAlta VENICE. |
| Project Hail Mary | 20 March 2026 | | ARRI Alexa IMAX and Mini LF. |
| Mortal Kombat II | 8 May 2026 | | ARRI Alexa LF. |
| The Mandalorian and Grogu | 22 May 2026 | | ARRI Alexa LF and Mini LF. Converted to 3D. |
| Supergirl | 26 June 2026 | | Sony CineAlta VENICE. Converted to 3D. |
| The End of Oak Street | 14 August 2026 | | Sony CineAlta VENICE. |
| Resident Evil | 18 September 2026 | | Sony CineAlta VENICE. |
| Street Fighter | 16 October 2026 | | ARRI Alexa Mini LF. |
| Godzilla Minus Zero | 3 November 2026 | | Sony CineAlta VENICE and ARRI Alexa Mini LF. |
| Ramayana: Part 1 | 6 November 2026 | | ARRI Alexa LF and Mini LF. Converted to 3D. |
| The Hunger Games: Sunrise on the Reaping | 17 November 2026 | | ARRI Alexa IMAX. |
| Children of Blood and Bone | 15 January 2027 | | TBA. |
| The Thomas Crown Affair | 5 March 2027 | | TBA. |
| Star Wars: Starfighter | 28 May 2027 | | TBA. |
| Elden Ring | 3 March 2028 | | TBA. |

== Films shot formatted with non-certified IMAX cameras ==
| Title | Release date | Format | Cameras & Information |
|---|---|---|---|
| Apollo 13 | 20 September 2002 | | Panavision Panaflex Gold II. First narrative feature film to be Specially Formatted for IMAX Exclusive. |
| Tron: Legacy | 17 December 2010 | | Sony CineAlta F35. |
| The Amazing Spider-Man | 3 July 2012 | | Red Epic. |
| Skyfall | 9 November 2012 | | ARRI Alexa M. |
| Oblivion | 19 April 2013 | | Sony CineAlta F65. |
| Riddick | 6 September 2013 | | ARRI Alexa. |
| I, Frankenstein | 24 January 2014 | | Red Epic. |
| Guardians of the Galaxy | 1 August 2014 | | ARRI Alexa XT. |
| Tomorrowland | 9 May 2015 | | Sony CineAlta F65. |
| Ghostbusters | 15 July 2016 | | ARRI Alexa XT. |
| Doctor Strange | 4 November 2016 | | ARRI Alexa 65 and XT Plus. |
| Beauty and the Beast | 17 March 2017 | | ARRI Alexa XT Plus. |
| Guardians of the Galaxy Vol. 2 | 6 May 2017 | | Red Weapon Dragon. |
| Pirates of the Caribbean: Dead Men Tell No Tales | 26 May 2017 | | ARRI Alexa XT and Mini. |
| Blade Runner 2049 | 6 October 2017 | | ARRI Alexa XT Studio and Mini. |
| Only The Brave | 27 October 2017 | | Sony CineAlta F65. |
| Thor: Ragnarok | 3 November 2017 | | ARRI Alexa 65 and Mini. |
| Maze Runner: The Death Cure | 26 January 2018 | | ARRI Alexa XT. |
| Black Panther | 16 February 2018 | | ARRI Alexa XT and Mini. |
| Ant-Man and the Wasp | 6 July 2018 | | ARRI Alexa 65 and Mini. |
| Mission: Impossible - Fallout | 27 July 2018 | | Panavision Millennium DXL. |
| Iron Man | 30 August 2018 | | Panavision Panaflex Gold II. A part of the Marvel Studios 10th Anniversary IMAX Film Festival. |
| Aquaman | 20 December 2018 | | ARRI Alexa SXT and Mini. |
| Alita: Battle Angel | 14 February 2019 | | ARRI Alexa Mini. |
| Captain Marvel | 8 March 2019 | | ARRI Alexa 65. |
| Spider-Man: Far From Home | 3 July 2019 | | ARRI Alexa Mini. |
| Maleficent: Mistress of Evil | 18 October 2019 | | Panavision Millennium DXL2. |
| The Aeronauts | 4 November 2019 | | Red Monstro. |
| 1917 | 19 January 2020 | | ARRI ALEXA Mini LF. |
| Nomadland | 19 February 2021 | | ARRI ALEXA Mini. |
| Black Widow | 9 July 2021 | | Panavision Millennium DXL2. |
| Uncharted | 18 February 2022 | | ARRI Alexa SXT and Mini. |
| Lightyear | 17 June 2022 | | First Animation feature film to be shot in Fully Virtual IMAX Camera. |
| Alien: Romulus | 16 August 2024 | | ARRI Alexa 35. |
| Megalopolis | 27 September 2024 | | ARRI Alexa 65. |
| The Conjuring: Last Rites | 5 September 2025 | | ARRI Alexa 35. |
| One Battle After Another | 26 September 2025 | | VistaVision 35mm Cameras. |
| Spider-Man: Brand New Day | 31 July 2026 | | ARRI Alexa 265 and Sony CineAlta VENICE. |
| Digger | 2 October 2026 | | VistaVision 35mm Cameras. |
| Avengers: Doomsday | 18 December 2026 | | ARRI Alexa 265. |
| Spider-Man: Beyond the Spider-Verse | 18 June 2027 | | Fully Virtual IMAX Camera. |
| Incredibles 3 | 16 June 2028 | | Fully Virtual IMAX Camera. |

== See also ==
- List of films released in IMAX
- List of IMAX-based rides
- Postcard from Earth
