= Sandi Sissel =

American cinematographer, director and producer

- Born: August 9, 1949 (age 77)
- Education: University of Wisconsin
- Occupations: Cinematographer; director; producer

Sandra "Sandi" Sue Sissel (born August 9, 1949) is an American cinematographer, director and producer. Her interest in photography was apparent as early as high school, where she was a photojournalist for her school paper. She is best known for documentaries such as Chicken Ranch, The Endurance: Shackleton's Legendary Antarctic Expedition , and Mother Teresa (1986) as well as TV shows like 60 Minutes, and feature films like Salaam Bombay!, Master and Commander Far Side of the World and Mr. and Mrs. Smith. She has been a member of the American Society of Cinematographers since 1994, the Academy of Motion Picture Arts and Sciences since 2004, and the Australian Cinematographers Society since 2017.

== Biography ==
She started college in 1967. She pursued her interests and desire to become a reporter by studying journalism and television. While she still wanted to pursue journalism, she did contribute to a few small films during her time in college. After completing this degree, she moved to Wisconsin where she pursued a graduate degree and filmed for the University of Wisconsin. After this she moved to New York City, where she soon got a job with both NBC and later ABC. During this time, she contributed as cinematographer for "The Wobblies" and assisted in camera or electrical work for Best Boy, Paul Jacobs and the Nuclear Gang, Free Voice of Labor: The Jewish Anarchists, Fame, No Nukes and "Rush". After working for ABC for a few years, she eventually decided to pursue a career that focused primarily on cinematography for documentaries and feature films in Los Angeles. In her pursuit of this career she has gained a great deal of respect from her colleagues as a female working behind the camera. She taught "Advanced Cinematography Techniques" and "Advanced Cinematography Practicum" at Tisch School of the Arts. from 2001 until 2015. Sissel adopted Raju Barnad (now known as Bernard Chamblis Sissel), one of the real-life street children who was cast in Salaam Bombay! In 2005 she married Kelly Drummond Cawthon with whom she has two children Joshua Cawthon and Jack Thomas Cawthon.

== Cinematography ==
Sandi is best known for her work as a cinematographer. Her interest in being behind the camera may have originated from her father's career as a photographer during her childhood.

=== Credits ===
- Paul Jacobs and the Nuclear Gang (documentary), 1977.
- The Wobblies (documentary), 1979.
- Americas in Transition, 1981.
- Anarchism in America (documentary), 1983.
- Chicken Ranch (documentary), 1983.
- The Making of Piscatory, 1983
- Seeing Red: Stories of American Communists (documentary), 1983.
- High Wire (documentary short), 1984.
- Before stonewall: The Making of a Gay and Lesbian, 1984.
- Broken Treaty at Battle Mountain, 1984.
- Witness to War: Dr. Charles Clements, 1984.
- Blood Circus, 1985
- Lilly Tomlin (documentary), 1985.
- The Global Assembly Line, 1985.
- Speaking Our Peace (documentary), 1985.
- Mother Teresa (documentary), 1986.
- Krik? Krak! Tales of a Nightmare, 1988.
- Salaam Bombay!, 1988.
- Calling the Shots (documentary), 1988.
- Heavy Petting (documentary), 1989.
- Fine Young Cannibals: The Concert, 1989.
- Russian Diary, 1989.
- To Protect Mother Earth: Broken Treaty II, 1991.
- Blood in Face, 1991.
- No Secrets, 1991.
- The People Under the Stairs, 1991.
- Roommates, 1993.
- Camp Nowhere, 1994.
- Barney's Great Adventure, 1998.
- The Reef, 1999.
- A Conversation with Gregory Peck (documentary), 1999.
- The Mod Squad, 1999.
- Austin Powers: The Spy Who Shagged Me, 1999.
- Yellow Card, 2000.
- The Endurance: Shackleton's Legendary Antarctic Expedition (documentary), 2000.
- Exit Wounds, 2001.
- Rock Star, 2001.
- Black Knight, 2001.
- Stealing Harvard, 2002.
- Master and Commander: The Far Side of the World, 2003.
- Cellular, 2004.
- Chisholm'72: Unsought 7 Unbossed (documentary), 2004.
- New York Minute, 2004.
- Going Upriver: The Long War of John Kerry (documentary), 2004.
- The Ballad of Jack and Rose, 2005.
- Roving Mars (documentary), 2006.
- The Lord God Bird (documentary), 2007.
- One Heartbeat: Bobby Bowden and the Florida State Seminoles (documentary), 2007.

== Teaching ==
Sandi has had experience teaching at the University of Wisconsin, and Tisch School of the Arts. In both cases she has taught film related classes.

== Awards ==
- Vision Award Nescens (1998)
- Women in Film Crystal Awards (1998)
- Television Award, nominated (2001)
- Best photography, British Academy of Film and Television Awards (2001)
- Golden Satellite Award, nomination (2004)
- Best cinematographer, International Press Academy (2004)
