= List of highest-grossing documentary films =

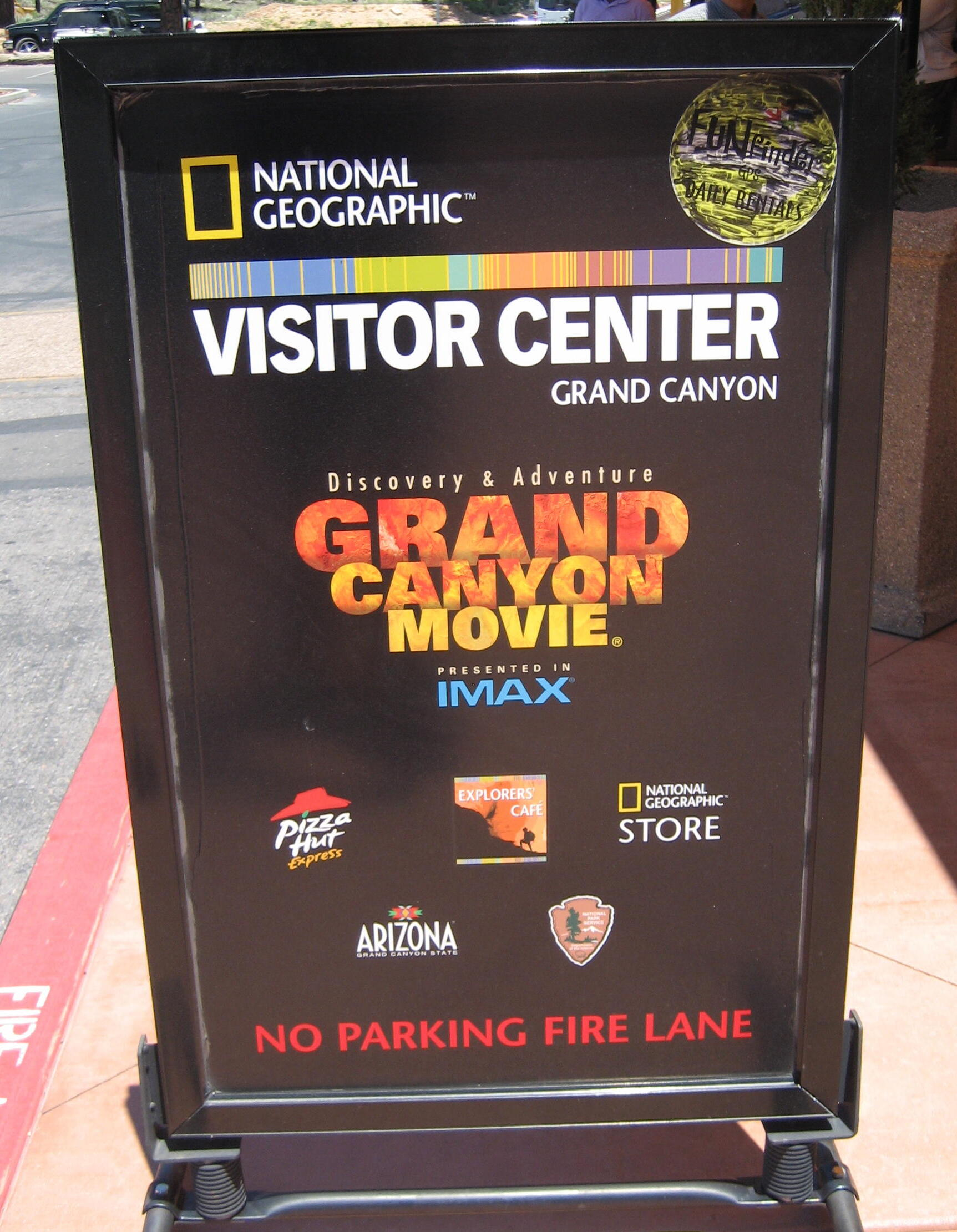
A sign for Grand Canyon: The Hidden Secrets (1984) at the National Geographic Society visitor center of Arizona. It remains one of the highest-grossing documentary films.

The following are the highest-grossing documentary films worldwide. The list also charts the highest-grossing documentary movies by calendar year. It includes different hybrid genre documentary films while excluding performance movies such as concert films, sometimes categorized as documentaries. Almost all reported figures are taken from Box Office Mojo and The Numbers, two publications that provide figures of film revenues. (Note: Box office figures may vary between sources due to differences in reporting practices, data availability, territorial coverage, theatrical re-releases, and methodological approaches.)

Traditional observational-stylized films are dominant in the list, notably space and nature documentaries. Few documentaries have outspaced the $100 million mark. The highest-grossing documentary film is the biographical film Michael Jackson's This Is It (2009) released following the artist's death that year, surpassing Fahrenheit 9/11 (2004), both of which grossed over $200 million. Grand Canyon: The Hidden Secrets (1984) also earned more than $200 million, while March of the Penguins (2005), Space Station 3D (2002), Everest (1998), To Fly! (1976), and Earth (2007) are the only other documentary films to reach $100 million in revenue as of 2026.

In addition, Grand Canyon: The Hidden Secrets remains the highest-grossing IMAX documentary film in history and from the 20th century. Fahrenheit 9/11 had the biggest opening weekend sales for a documentary at over $23.9 million in the U.S. as well the widest release for a documentary film in its opening weekend.

== Key ==
Key
†	Indicates films currently playing in theaters
‡	Indicates US and Canada grosses only
*	Indicates films shown primarily in premium large format theaters

== Highest-grossing documentary films ==
Top 50 highest-grossing documentaries as of November 2026 (See also The-Numbers Top 50)
Rank	Title	Lifetime gross	Year	Narrator(s)	Topic(s)	Ref.(s)
1	Michael Jackson's This Is It	$267,983,588	2009	—N/a	Rehearsals for a concert residency by Michael Jackson	
2	Grand Canyon: The Hidden Secrets*	$239,000,000	1984	—N/a	Grand Canyon	
3	Fahrenheit 9/11	$222,446,882	2004	Michael Moore	The presidency of George W. Bush, the Iraq War	
4	March of the Penguins (La Marche de l'empereur)	$133,276,359	2005	Charles Berling	Emperor penguin of Antarctica	
5	Space Station 3D*	$128,363,881	2002	Tom Cruise	International Space Station	
6	Everest*	$127,990,128	1998	Liam Neeson	Mount Everest	
7	To Fly!*	$120,700,000	1976	Thomas McGrath	History of aviation in the U.S.	
8	Earth	$108,975,160	2009	Patrick Stewart	Diversity of wild habitats and creatures across the planet	
9	Deep Sea 3D*	$98,230,905	2006	Johnny Depp	Sea life	
10	You Can See Everything	$91,963,385‡	2026	Nathan Fielder	Elizabeth Holmes and Billy Evans	
11	Oceans	$86,787,530	2009	Pierce Brosnan	Marine species of Earth's five oceans	
12	Hubble*	$74,249,729	2010	Leonardo DiCaprio	Repair and update of the Hubble Space Telescope	
13	Amazing China (Li hai le, wo de guo)	$72,506,344	2018	—N/a	China during Xi Jinping's tenure from a Chinese perspective	
14	The Dream Is Alive*	$70,000,000‡	1985	Walter Cronkite	NASA's Space Shuttle program	
15	Dolphins*	$69,600,000	2000	Pierce Brosnan	Dolphins	
16	Antarctica*	$66,070,389	1991	Alex Scott	Antarctica	
17	The Living Sea*	$64,800,000‡	1995	Meryl Streep	Marine biology/oceans (conservation)	
18	Bowling for Columbine	$58,008,423	2002	Michael Moore	Gun violence and causes of Columbine High School massacre (Moore perspective)	
19	In Search of Noah's Ark	$55,700,000‡	1976	—N/a	Alleged resting place of Noah's Ark	
20	To the Limit*	$53,000,000	1989	—N/a	Effects of intense physical activity on the human body	
21	Sea Monsters: A Prehistoric Adventure*	$50,728,163	2007	Liev Schreiber	Prehistoric marine reptiles	
22	An Inconvenient Truth	$49,782,012	2006	—N/a	Global warming	
23	Under the Sea*	$48,059,141	2009	—N/a	A look at the underwater of Indo-Pacific areas / Impact of global warming on the oceans	
24	Born to Be Wild*	$47,309,175	2011	Morgan Freeman	Orphaned orangutans and elephants	
25	Mysteries of Egypt*	$44,703,731	1998		Howard Carter's discovery of King Tutankhamun's tomb in 1922	
26	This Is Cinerama*	$41,600,000‡	1952	Lowell Thomas	Demonstration of the Cinerama film format	
27	Magnificent Desolation: Walking on the Moon 3D*	$40,339,402	2005	Tom Hanks	Apollo program (first humans on the Moon)	
28	Encounter in the Third Dimension*	$40,102,213	1999	Harry Shearer	Fictional characters describe the history and technology of 3D movies	
29	Galapagos*	$40,070,358	1999		Carole Baldwin (marine biologist, Smithsonian Institution) and her first trips to Galapagos Islands	
30	Winged Migration	$39,134,983	2001	Jacques Perrin; Philippe Labro	Bird migration	
31	Chimpanzee	$36,834,823	2012	Tim Allen	Common chimpanzee named "Oscar"	
32	Sicko	$36,093,504	2007	Michael Moore	Healthcare in the U.S. (health insurance and pharmaceutical industry)	
33	Woodstock	$34,699,266‡	1970		Woodstock Festival, 1969	
34	My Love, Don't Cross That River	$34,100,278	2014		76-year marriage of a South Korean couple	
35	2016: Obama's America	$33,449,086	2012		Barack Obama	
36	Wild Safari: A South African Adventure*	$32,446,750	2005		Real-life safari experience in South Africa following a scientist and tracker in search of the "Big Five"	
37	Justin Bieber's Believe	$32,226,781	2013	—N/a	Justin Bieber	
38	Seven Wonders of the World*	$32,100,000‡	1956		Natural and man-made wonders	
39	Thrill Ride: The Science of Fun*	$31,279,211	1997		Fun parks (imagination of movement)	
40	African Cats	$30,857,747	2011	Samuel L. Jackson; Patrick Stewart	Lions and cheetahs in the African savannah	
41	Cinerama Holiday*	$29,600,000‡	1955		Travel	
42	Bugs!*	$29,445,226	2003		Insects in Borneo's rainforest	
43	Free Solo	$29,390,279	2018		Alex Honnold in his route to free solo climb on El Capitan	
44	Ghosts of the Abyss*	$28,742,313	2003	Bill Paxton	Expedition staged by James Cameron and others to the Wreck of the RMS Titanic	
45	The Glacier Fox	$27,000,000	1978	Eiji Okada	Two foxes in Hokkaido	(Note: See The Glacier Fox § Box office)
46	Beavers*	$26,400,000‡	1988	Earl Pennington	Beavers	
47	Twenty Two	$26,289,378	2017		Chinese women (200,000 estimated) forced into prostitution by the Japanese army during WWII.	
48	Ocean Wonderland*	$25,977,417	2003		Underwater environment	
49	Extreme*	$25,956,582	2003		6 extreme sports: big wave surfing, ice climbing, skiing, snowboarding, windsurfing and rock climbing.	
50	Chariots of the Gods (Erinnerungen an die Zukunft)	$25,900,000‡	1970	Heinz-Detlev Bock (various)	Extraterrestrial life	

== Sub-genres ==
=== Nature documentaries ===
Nature documentaries that surpassed $20 million
Rank	Title	Lifetime gross	Year	Ref.(s)
1	March of the Penguins (La Marche de l'empereur)	$133,276,359	2005	
2	Earth	$108,975,160	2009	
3	Deep Sea 3D	$98,230,905	2006	
4	Oceans	$86,787,530	2009	
5	Dolphins	$69,600,000	2000	
6	Antarctica	$66,070,389	1991	
7	The Living Sea	$64,800,000‡	1995	
8	Sea Monsters: A Prehistoric Adventure	$50,728,163	2007	
9	Under the Sea	$48,059,141	2009	
10	Born to be Wild	$47,309,175	2011	
11	Galapagos	$40,070,358	1999	
12	Winged Migration	$39,134,983	2001	
13	Chimpanzee	$36,834,823	2012	
14	Wild Safari	$32,446,750	2005	
15	African Cats	$30,857,747	2011	
16	Bugs!	$29,445,226	2003	
17	The Glacier Fox	$27,000,000	1978	
18	Beavers	$26,400,000‡	1988	
19	Ocean Wonderland	$25,977,417	2003	
20	A Beautiful Planet	$25,520,273	2016	
21	Born in China	$25,081,168	2016	
22	To the Arctic 3D	$23,695,388	2012	

=== Space ===
Space documentaries that surpassed $15 million as of May 2025
Rank	Title	Lifetime gross	Year	Ref.(s)
1	Space Station 3D	$128,363,881	2002	
2	Hubble	$74,249,729	2010	
3	The Dream Is Alive	$70,000,000‡	1985	
4	Magnificent Desolation: Walking on the Moon 3D	$40,339,402	2005	
5	A Beautiful Planet	$25,520,273	2016	
6	Blue Planet	$22,800,000‡	1990	

== Highest-grossing documentaries by year ==
Yearly highest-grossing documentaries (According to The Numbers and, where unavailable, Box Office Mojo)
Year	Title	Total gross
2026	You Can See Everything	$92,134,658
2025	Becoming Led Zeppelin	$16,766,323
2024	Am I Racist?	$12,311,598‡
2023	Beijing 2022 (北京 2022)	$24,790,100
2022	Moonage Daydream	$13,910,491
2021	The Arctic: Our Last Great Wilderness	$16,894,562
2020	Break the Silence: The Movie	$10,670,308
2019	Bring the Soul: The Movie	$12,984,708
2018	Amazing China (Li hai le, wo de guo)	$72,506,344
2017	Twenty-Two	$25,733,825
2016	A Beautiful Planet	$25,520,273
2015	Amy	$23,778,585
2014	My Love, Don't Cross That River	$34,100,278
2013	Justin Bieber's Believe	$32,226,781
2012	Chimpanzee	$36,834,823
2011	Born to Be Wild	$47,309,175
2010	Oceans	$86,787,530
2009	Michael Jackson's This Is It	$261,183,588
2008	Dolphins and Whales Tribes of the Ocean	$17,252,287
2007	Sea Monsters: A Prehistoric Adventure	$50,728,163
2006	Deep Sea 3D	$88,452,735
2005	March of the Penguins (La Marche de l'empereur)	$133,276,359
2004	Fahrenheit 9/11	$222,446,882
2003	Winged Migration	$39,134,983
2002	Space Station 3D	$128,363,881
2001	Shackleton's Antarctic Adventure	$19,667,161
2000	Dolphins	$69,600,000
1999	Encounter in the Third Dimension	$40,102,213
1998	Everest	$127,990,128
1997	Thrill Ride: The Science of Fun	$31,279,211
1996	Microcosmos	$6,973,842
1995	The Living Sea	$64,800,000‡
1994	Hoop Dreams	$11,768,371
1993	Black Diamond Rush	$1,634,386
1992	Daddy and the Muscle Academy	$109,513‡
1991	Antarctica	$66,070,389
1989	To the Limit	$53,000,000
1988	Beavers	$26,400,000‡
1987	Hail! Hail! Rock 'n' Roll	$719,323‡
1986	Stripper	$39,065‡
1985	The Dream Is Alive	$70,000,000‡
1984	Grand Canyon: The Hidden Secrets	$239,000,000
1982	It Came from Hollywood	$2,091,037‡
1981	This Is Elvis	$429,146‡
1980	In Search of Historic Jesus	$22,000,000‡
1979	Dirt	$9,200,000‡
1978	The Glacier Fox	$27,000,000
1977	In Search of Noah's Ark	$55,700,000‡
1976	To Fly!	$120,700,000
1973	Chariots of the Gods (Erinnerungen an die Zukunft)	$25,900,000‡
1972	Five Summer Stories	—N/a
1970	Woodstock	$34,699,266‡
1969	Muhammad Ali: The Greatest	—N/a
1967	Bob Dylan: Don't Look Back	—N/a
1966	The Endless Summer	$20,000,000
1964	Belarmino	—N/a
1956	Seven Wonders of the World	$32,100,000‡
1955	Cinerama Holiday	$29,600,000‡
1952	This Is Cinerama	$41,600,000‡
1927	The Epic of Everest	$133,823
1922	The Great White Silence	$85,214
1919	South	$66,676

== See also ==
- Lists of highest-grossing films
  - List of highest-grossing films
  - List of highest-grossing concert films
- List of films by box office admissions
