= Caroline Alexander (author) =

American / British author, classicist and filmmaker (born 1956)

- Caroline Alexander (1982)
- Born: March 13, 1956 (age 70); United States
- Education: Somerville College, Oxford
- Occupations: Classicist, filmmaker

Signature
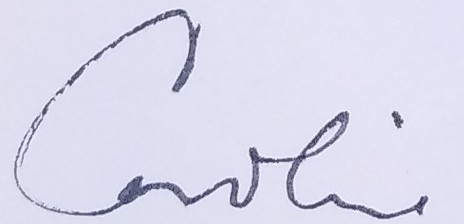

Caroline Alexander is an American author, classicist and filmmaker. She is the author of the best-selling Skies of Thunder, The Endurance, The Bounty, and other works of literary non-fiction. In 2015, she published a translation of Homer's Iliad, the first English translation of an Homeric poem by a woman.

Alexander is also a writer and producer of documentaries such as The Endurance (based upon her book of the same title) and Tiger Tiger.

== Personal life and education ==
Born March 13, 1956, in the United States to British parents, Alexander grew up in North Florida, but travelled widely, living in the West Indies, Italy, England, Ireland, and the Netherlands. She began her classical studies at Florida State University in her senior year of high-school. In 1977, among the first class of female Rhodes Scholars, she attended Somerville College, Oxford, taking her degree in Philosophy and Theology.

Between 1982 and 1985, she established a small department of classics at the University of Malawi, in south-central Africa. Following this, she obtained her doctorate in Classics at Columbia University, as a Mellon Fellow in the Humanities. A competitive athlete, Alexander helped open the sport of Modern Pentathlon to women, and was a US Modern Pentathlon World Team alternate (1982).

== Career ==
Alexander began her career as a freelance writer while in graduate school, and subsequently has published widely on subjects ranging from Antarctic exploration, travels in central Africa, tigers, butterfly poachers, ancient history, lost treasure, Xanadu, and military subjects such as shell shock and blast-induced neurotrauma. She has published two New York Times best-sellers (The Endurance, The Bounty).

Alexander was a Contributing Writer for National Geographic Magazine for many years, and has also written for The New Yorker, Outside and Smithsonian among other publications; her work has appeared in a number of anthologies of literary non-fiction.

Her National Geographic Magazine cover story, "The Invisible War on The Brain", was praised for exploring the effects of blast-induced trauma on modern soldiers, and nominated for a Kavli Science Journalism Award.

Alexander is a member of the American Philological Association, the Royal Geographical Society, the Explorer's Club, and the Directors Guild of America.

== Published books ==
- Skies of Thunder: The Deadly World War II Mission Over the Roof of the World, Viking / Ithaka (2024 / 2025). “Alexander’s vivid retelling of this aerial feat is matched only by her exquisite rendering of the pilots’ fear.” —The New York Times Book Review (Editors' Choice).
- The Iliad: A New Translation Ecco Press/Vintage Classics (2015).
- Lost Gold of the Dark Ages: War, Treasure and the Mystery of the Saxons, Random House/National Geographic Society (2011).
- The War that Killed Achilles: The True Story of the Iliad and the Trojan War, Viking / Faber (2009).
- The Bounty: The True Story of the Mutiny on the Bounty, Viking / Harper Collins (2003). A New York Times bestseller. National Book Critics Circle Award finalist. New York Times top nine books of 2003.
- The Endurance: Shackleton's Legendary Antarctic Expedition. Knopf/Bloomsbury (1998). A New York Times bestseller, translated into several languages and made into a documentary.
- Mrs. Chippy's Last Expedition, 1914–1915. HarperCollins/Bloomsbury (1997). Also published in German and Greek.
- Battle's End: A Seminole Football Team Revisited, Knopf (1995).
- The Way to Xanadu, Orion (1993)/Knopf (1994) travels to the landmarks of Coleridge's poem Kubla Khan. A New York Times “Notable Book of the Year.”
- One Dry Season: In the Footsteps of Mary Kingsley in Equatorial Africa, Knopf / Bloomsbury (1989). A Book of the Month Club selection. Published in paperback by Vintage, 1991; and Phoenix, 1993.

== Filmography ==
Tiger, Tiger	2015	White Mountain Films/Kennedy Marshall production	George Butler producer/director; Caroline Alexander writer/producer	Theatrical documentary (90 min) and Giant Screen and IMAX® version (40min), following big-cat conservationist Alan Rabinowitz into one of the last tiger habitats, the mangrove forest of the Indian and Bangladesh Sundarbans. The Giant Screen version is narrated by Oscar® winner Michelle Yeoh.
The Lord God Bird	2008	White Mountain Films Production	George Butler producer/director; Caroline Alexander writer	90-minute theatrical documentary about the possible re-discovery of the ivory-billed woodpecker
Shackleton's Antarctic Adventure	2001	White Mountain Films Production	George Butler producer/director; Caroline Alexander writer/consultant	An Imax® and Giant Screen about Shackleton's epic adventure, filmed in original 15/70mm Imax film.
The Endurance	2000	White Mountain Films Production	George Butler producer/director; Caroline Alexander writer/Executive Producer	90 minute theatrical documentary about Shackleton's 1914 expedition, narrated by Liam Neeson. Released in 2001; National Board of Review Best Documentary and numerous other awards; two hour television version nominated for a British Academy Award, 2000.

== Articles ==
- “Crossing the Wine-Dark Sea: In Search of the Places that inspired the Iliad.” (the refugees who carried the Iliad tradition out of Greece). The American Scholar, Summer 2019.
- "War of Words" (Britain's secret propaganda unit in WW1). Lapham’s Quarterly, Spring 2018.
- "The Dread Gorgon" (origin of the face of fear). Lapham's Quarterly, Summer 2017.
- "Greece, Gods, and the Great Beyond" (Ancient Greek quest for immortality). National Geographic Magazine. July 2016.
- “War Shock: Blast and the Brain” (blast-induced traumatic brain injury). National Geographic Magazine. February 2015.
- “500 pounds of Stealth” (seeking tigers in the Indian and Bangladesh Sunderbans). Outside. June 2014.
- “The Wine-Like Sea” (what did Homer mean?). Lapham's Quarterly. Summer 2013.
- “Cry of the Tiger” (the plight of our greatest cat). National Geographic Magazine. December, 2011. Nominated for Overseas Press Club Award.
- “Gold in the Ground” (discovery of an Anglo-Saxon treasure hoard). National Geographic Magazine. November, 2011.
- “Shock of War” (WW1 shell-shock and Traumatic Brain Injury). Smithsonian. September 2010.
- “The Great Game” (war and sport). Lapham's Quarterly. Summer, 2010.
- “Captain Bligh's Cursed Breadfruit” (Jamaica's botanical legacy from the Bounty). Smithsonian. September 2009.
- “If the Stones Could Speak” (new theories about Stonehenge). National Geographic Magazine, June 2008.
- “Tigerland” (travels in the Indian Sundarbans). The New Yorker, April 21, 2008.
- “Making a New World’: Gertrude Bell and the Creation of Iraq” (nation-building in the 1920s). National Geographic Magazine (international editions), March, 2008.
- “The Face of War” (masks for soldiers mutilated in WW1). Smithsonian. February 2007.
- “Murdering the Impossible” (profile of mountaineer Reinhold Messner). National Geographic Magazine, November 2006. National Magazine Award Finalist.
- “Across the River Styx” (looking for MIA's in Vietnam). The New Yorker, October 25, 2004.
- “The Wreck of the Pandora” (wreck of the ship carrying the captured mutineers of the Bounty). The New Yorker, August 4, 2003.
- “Echoes of the Heroic Age”; “Ascent to Glory”; “Alexander the Conqueror” (three part series on the history of ancient Greece). National Geographic Magazine, December 1999 – March 2000.
- “Shackleton and the Legend of Endurance” (Sir Ernest Shackleton's 1914-16 Expedition). National Geographic Magazine, November 1998.
- “Crimes of Passion” (a butterfly poaching conspiracy). Outside, January 1996.
- “Plato Speaks” (the trial of Hastings Banda, dictator of Malawi and ardent classicist). Granta, September 1995.
- “A Shot in the Night” (death at a girl's camp in Tennessee) Outside, July 1994.
- “Little Men” (the mysterious shrunken men of Ecuador). Outside, April 1994.
- “An Ideal State” (Plato's Republic in Malawi). The New Yorker, December 16, 1991.
- “The White Goddess of the Wangora” (the earliest dramatic movie made in Africa). The New Yorker, April 8, 1991.
- “Vital Powers: a Profile of Daphne Park, O.B.E., C.M.G.” (a profile of one Britain's first female diplomats). The New Yorker, January 30, 1989.
- "The North Borneo Expedition of 1981" (insect collecting in Borneo). The New Yorker, September 14, 1987.
