= The Princess and the Pea (disambiguation) =

"The Princess and the Pea" is a fairy tale by Hans Christian Andersen.

The Princess and the Pea may also refer to:

- The Princess and the Pea (2001 film), an IMAX film directed by Curtis Linton
- The Princess and the Pea (2002 film), an animated film directed by Mark Swan
- Princess and the Pea (board game), a children's game
- "The Princess and the Pea" (Faerie Tale Theatre), an episode of Faerie Tale Theatre
