= Going Upriver =

- Promotional poster for the documentary
- Directed by: George Butler
- Written by: Douglas Brinkley (book)
- Produced by: George Butler; Daniel Holton-Roth; Mark N. Hopkins; Sarah Scully
- Edited by: Tim Squyres
- Music by: Philip Glass
- Production company: White Mountain Films
- Distributed by: THINKFilm
- Release date: September 14, 2004
- Running time: 87 minutes
- Country: United States
- Language: English

Going Upriver: The Long War of John Kerry is a 2004 documentary film on U.S. Senator John Kerry's military service during the Vietnam War and his subsequent participation in the peace movement. There is significant emphasis on Kerry's famous speech before a Senate committee, historical footage from the Winter Soldier Investigations, and coverage of the Dewey Canyon III anti-war demonstrations in Washington, D.C. The majority of the film is composed of archival footage, with much of it in the original black-and-white format.

From the producer's website:

This is a feature length documentary about character and moral leadership during a time of national crisis. Loosely based on the bestselling book Tour of Duty by Douglas Brinkley, Going Upriver examines the story of John Kerry and the key events that made him a national figure and the man he is today. Going Upriver director George Butler (best known for his highly acclaimed films Pumping Iron, featuring Arnold Schwarzenegger and The Endurance: Shackleton's Legendary Antarctic Expedition) first realized Kerry’s importance to his generation and began documenting his journey in photographs in 1969, covering Kerry's leadership of the Vietnam Veterans Against the War (VVAW), his early political campaigns, as well as intimate moments of his personal life. The film weaves together Butler’s extraordinary photographs with archival film, interviews with Kerry’s closest associates, and more contemporary images of the Senator at home and abroad.

Going Upriver is the culmination of a forty-year friendship between Kerry and George Butler. They first met in 1964 while Butler was a reporter and photographer, and published a book together (The New Soldier, about Vietnam veterans and the anti-war Movement) in 1971. Butler has documented Kerry's political career with thousands of photographs, and Kerry is godfather to one of Butler's sons. Butler builds a portrait of Kerry through conversations with the men who served with him, people who went to college with him, and relatives. He narrows the story to Vietnam, and uses vintage footage to show the duty to which Kerry asked to be transferred. The recollections from his shipmates, and shots of battle and battle damage on his and other swift boats, underscores the nature of the duty and Kerry's performance of it.

The video of his TV appearances and congressional testimony when he got back provides the context to Kerry's change of heart on the war and his determination to see to it that his comrades stopped dying over there. Considerable attention is paid to the lesser known activities and details behind some of that era's most tumultuous events, such as the occupying of the Washington Mall despite court injunctions and the two marches to the Arlington National Cemetery. Descriptive narrative often gives way to the more powerful messages conveyed by the expressions and actions of participants caught on film at these events. Some of the footage shot in Vietnam could be considered mildly graphic.

Going Upriver was first pre-released at the Toronto International Film Festival under the "Real to Reel" documentary category on September 9 through September 18, 2004.

== Cast ==
Credited Cast - Partial Listing:

Douglas Brinkley........ Himself - Official Kerry Biographer
Max Cleland.............. Himself - Former Democratic Senator (Georgia)
Bestor Cram.............. Himself - VVAW Anti-War Activist, Vietnam Veteran (as Bester Cram)
Richard Holbrooke...... Himself - Former US Ambassador to the UN
John Kerry................. Himself (archive footage)
Joe Klein................... Himself - Writer
Lenny Rotman............ Himself - VVAW Anti-War Activist, Vietnam Veteran
Wade Sanders........... Himself - Fellow Swift Boat Skipper, Vietnam Veteran
Neil Sheehan............. Himself - Author, Historian
David Thorne.............. Himself - Childhood Friend, Yale Classmate, Vietnam Veteran
Thomas Oliphant........ Himself - Boston Globe reporter who covered the veterans' protest

== Reception ==
On review aggregator website Rotten Tomatoes, the film holds an approval rating of 89% based on 85 reviews, and an average rating of 7.23/10. The website's critical consensus states that the film contains "Interesting and revealing footage of both Kerry and the Vietnam era in general." On Metacritic, the film has a weighted average score of 70 out of 100, based on 31 critics, indicating "generally favorable" reviews.
