= Chicken Ranch =

Chicken Ranch can refer to:

- Chicken Ranch (Texas), a former brothel in Texas
- Chicken Ranch (Nevada), an operating brothel in Nevada, inspired by the original Texas brothel
  - Chicken Ranch (film), a 1983 documentary film about the brothel in Nevada
- Chicken Ranch Rancheria, an Indian reservation or rancheria in Tuolumne County, California
- A facility for Poultry farming, traditionally called a "chicken ranch"
