= Amazing China =

- Theatrical release poster

Chinese name
- Simplified Chinese: 厉害了，我的国
- Traditional Chinese: 厲害了，我的國
- Literal meaning: Amazing, my country
Transcriptions
Standard Mandarin
- Hanyu Pinyin: lìhaile, wǒde guó
- Directed by: Wei Tie
- Based on: Amazing China (2017 series)
- Starring: Xi Jinping
- Production companies: China Central Television; China Film Co., Ltd
- Distributed by: Alibaba Pictures
- Release dates: March 2, 2018 (Mainland China); May 9, 2018 (Macao)
- Running time: 90 minutes
- Country: China
- Language: Standard Mandarin Chinese

Amazing China (Chinese: 厉害了, 我的国) is a 2018 Chinese propaganda documentary film that depicts Chinese advancements in science, technology, and industry, and poverty reduction during Xi Jinping's tenure as the General Secretary of the Chinese Communist Party (paramount leader of China).

== Name ==
The Chinese title of the film is "厉害了, 我的国" (pinyin: lìhaile, wǒde guó roughly translates to "Amazing, My Country"), and derives from the online slang expression "厉害了，我的哥", meaning "bravo, my brother", often used by several official social media accounts of state organizations like the Communist Youth League of China.

== Content ==
The content of the film is from a six-episode TV documentary with the same English title shown in 2017 (Chinese title: 辉煌中国), which includes the construction of the China Railway High-speed, the Hong Kong-Zhuhai-Macau Bridge and the Five-hundred-meter Aperture Spherical radio Telescope.

The film highlights China's achievements during Xi Jinping's tenure, particularly major manufacturing, infrastructure, science and technology, and military projects.

Huajian Group, a Chinese shoe making company hiring thousands of workers in Ethiopia, was portrayed in the film as a model of "introducing China's experience of prosperity to Africa." According to a report of the Associated Press, however, the company's Ethiopian workers complained about low wages, the lack of safety equipment, forced labor and not being permitted to form a trade union.

The documentary ends with "New World", a song performed by pop singer Sun Nan.

== Production ==
The film was co-produced by China Central Television and China Film Co., Ltd, both state-owned enterprises, and directed by Wei Tie.

== Release ==
The film was released in Mainland China on March 2, 2018, distributed by Alibaba Pictures. It was reported by South China Morning Post that some state companies and government-affiliated organizations required employees to watch the film. On 19 April 2018, the Publicity Department of the Chinese Communist Party issued a memo requesting that Chinese websites and cinemas stop showing the film.

The film was screened in a theater in Macao from May 9 to May 14, 2018.

== Reception ==
Douban, the leading film review website in China, disabled the commenting and rating functions on the film's page, instead showing a "media rating" of 8.5/10 and reviews written by state media including Xinhua and the People's Daily. In 2018, the Cyberspace Administration of China requested the Chinese branch of its owner, Amazon, for the film to be removed from IMDb because of the bad reviews. Shortly after the request, some negative reviews disappeared. Amazon denied that it removed the bad reviews at the request of the Chinese government.

Internationally, it is widely considered to be a propaganda film, and an effort by the Chinese Communist Party to increase its soft power. The film also is believed to be a significant step towards a personality cult of Xi Jinping by some observers. While Amazing China does demonstrate a new level of sophistication in state propaganda, along with other self-congratulatory representations of China's growth "betrays an unshakeable anxiety about the continuing legitimacy of CCP rule."

== See also ==
- List of highest-grossing documentary films
