= Deepsea =

Deepsea, deep-sea, or deep sea may refer to:

- the deep sea, the lowest layer of the ocean
- Deepsea ASA, a subsidiary of Odfjell Drilling
- Deep Sea 3D, an IMAX film
- Deep Sea (film), 2023 Chinese film

== See also ==
- Deep-Sea Trench
- Deep-sea exploration
- Deepsea mining
- Deep-sea submersible
  - Deepsea Challenger
