= James Neihouse =

American cinematographer (born 1955)

- Born: James Lawson Neihouse; April 3, 1955 (age 71); Paris, Arkansas, U.S
- Other name: James Neihouse
- Occupation: Cinematographer
- Years active: 1976–present
- Spouse(s): Leslie Vock (1985–present; 2 children)

James Lawson Neihouse (born April 3, 1955) is an American cinematographer who has been involved with many IMAX 2D and IMAX 3D films.

== Early life ==
Neihouse was born in Paris, Arkansas; his father, Joe Neihouse, was a construction worker, and his mother, Pauline Neihouse, a school teacher. Neihouse graduated from Paris High School in 1973, where he served as the school's yearbook photographer. He received his bachelor's degree from Brooks Institute in Santa Barbara, California in 1976.

He went on to work for Marine Photographic Associates (MPA), a Santa Barbara-based production company that specialized in underwater photography and filmmaking. It was during this time that he met Graeme Ferguson, the president and co-inventor of the IMAX film format, while working on the first underwater IMAX film, OCEAN. The two became friends and under Ferguson's mentorship, Neihouse continued working in the IMAX format.

His first credit as director of photography was on the first IMAX film to be nominated for an Academy Award — The Eruption of Mount St. Helens! — which was nominated for Best Documentary Short in 1980.

Between 1982 and 1984 Neihouse worked as a news cameraman at the Santa Barbara, CA ABC affiliate KEYT.

In 1984 Neihouse was called to the Kennedy Space Center (KSC) to help film shuttle launches for Graeme Ferguson's documentary about the US Space Shuttle program, The Dream Is Alive. It was during filming that Neihouse met his future wife, Leslie Vock, a NASA public affairs specialist at KSC. They were married in 1985 and Neihouse moved from Santa Barbara, to Cocoa, FL.

He became astronaut training manager for the IMAX Space Team in 1988. He was responsible for training space shuttle crews, and later space station crews, on the use and operation of the IMAX film cameras. Neihouse has trained more than 150 NASA astronauts and 20 Russian cosmonauts on 20 Space Shuttle flights and 6 Space Station Expeditions to film in space aboard the Space Shuttle, the Russian Space Station Mir, and the International Space Station. He also oversees and assists in IMAX hardware integration into the NASA space flight system.

In 2017 he was selected as a "Film Envoy" by the U.S. State Department's film diplomacy program, American Film Showcase, and continues to be involved as an AFS "Film Expert".

As a member of the American Society of Cinematographers, Neihouse is Vice Chair of The Friends of the ASC and serves on both the Membership Committee and the Education & Outreach Committee. He also currently serves on the Board of Directors for the Giant Screen Cinema Association and is on the Executive Committee and the Innovations Committee.

== Awards ==
- Silver Snoopy - 2001, presented by the Astronauts for outstanding contributions to mission safety and success.
- Best Cinematography Award for his work on the IMAX 3D film Space Station 3D, 2002.
- NASA Group Achievement Award - for "providing innovative solutions, demonstrating the ability to overcome technical and logistical obstacles, and ensuring a complete commitment to achieving success" International Space Station, Phase I and II, July 2003
- Distinguished Alumni Award Alumni Association of Brooks Institute, 2008.
- NASA Group Achievement Award - for "outstanding accomplishment" Hubble Space Telescope repair mission STS-125, May 2009
- Best Cinematography Award for his work on the IMAX 3D film Hubble 3D, 2010.
- Paris, Arkansas Hall of Fame, Inductee - 2011
- Hubble 25th Anniversary Commendation - "for contributions that rival the best that NASA has achieved in innovation and overcoming challenges", 2015
- Distinguished Alumni Award from the University of Central Arkansas - April 2–16
- Imaging Alliance, Visionary Photographer Award - January, 2017
- Outstanding Achievement Award from the Giant Screen Cinema Association (GSCA) - September, 2025

== Professional Organizations ==
- Member of the American Society of Cinematographers (ASC) 2015–Present
- Member of the Academy of Motion Picture Arts and Sciences (AMPAS), cinematography branch, 2014–Present
- Honorary Member of the Malaysian Society of Cinematographers (MySC) 2017–Present
- Member of International Camera Guild, Local 600 - First Camera, 1987–Present
- Member of the Giant Screen Cinema Association (GSCA), 1986–Present

== Filmography (partial list) ==
Space: The New Frontier
One More Orbit
Expedition Chesapeake, A Journey of Discovery
A Beautiful Planet
Hubble 3D
NASCAR 3D: The IMAX Experience
Forces of Nature (IMAX)
Roving Mars
Space Station 3D (IMAX Hall of Fame Inductee 2014)
Pulse: A Stomp Odyssey
Jane Goodall's Wild Chimpanzees
Bears
Ocean Oasis (Winner Wildscreen Film Festival Panda Award 2002 Jackson Hole Wildlife Film Festival 2001)
India, Kingdom of the Tiger
Michael Jordan to the Max
Olympic Glory
Mexico
L5, First City In Space
Whales
Destiny in Space
Mission To MIR
Blue Planet (IMAX Hall of Fame Inductee 2003)
Rolling Stones At The MAX (IMAX Hall of Fame Inductee 2010)
The Dream Is Alive (IMAX Hall of Fame Inductee 2002 Special Recognition Award 2012)
Arkansas: Center of Attraction
The Eruption of Mount St. Helens! (Academy Award Nomination - Best Short Documentary 1980)
Race The Wind
Hail Columbia
To Be An Astronaut
On The Wing
Darwin On The Galapagos
