= Antarctica (1991 film) =

- Directed by: John Weiley
- Written by: Les Murray; Michael Perfit; John Weiley
- Produced by: John Weiley; David Flatman
- Narrated by: Alex Scott
- Music by: Nigel Westlake
- Production company: Heliograph Productions
- Distributed by: IMAX
- Release date: 1991

Antarctica is a 1991 IMAX documentary film documenting the continent of Antarctica. The film has a 38-minute runtime, and consists of aerial footage of the topography and fauna of the continent. It was narrated by Alex Scott and has music by Australian composer Nigel Westlake, who later adapted his score into a popular concert suite of the same name for guitar and orchestra.

As well as screening in IMAX theatres, the movie was released on laserdisc, DVD, Blu-ray and has been available in high definition on streaming services, although the quality of the image on DVD was poor.

It grossed more than US$65 million and is one of the most profitable Australian-financed films, and one of the highest-grossing documentary films.

== Personnel ==
- Director: John Weiley
- Producers: John Weiley, David Flatman
- Writers: Les Murray, Michael Perfit, John Weiley
- Narrator: Alex Scott
- Music: Nigel Westlake
