= Sun Nan =

Chinese pop singer (born 1969)

- Born: 18 February 1969 (age 57); Dalian, Liaoning, China
- Genre: Mandopop
- Occupation: Singer
- Instrument: Vocals
- Years active: 1990–present

Chinese name
- Traditional Chinese: 孫楠
- Simplified Chinese: 孙楠
Transcriptions
Standard Mandarin
- Hanyu Pinyin: Sūn Nán

Sun Nan (Chinese: 孙楠; pinyin: Sūn Nán; born February 18, 1969) is a pop singer from Dalian in mainland China. His songs include "Be there or Be Square", "The Wind Goes to North", "Save", and his song for the 2008 Summer Olympics, "Forever Friends". Sun's album Crescent Moon was released in 1990. He has released 12 albums with over 10 million sales in total. Since 2012, Sun has judged or hosted numerous singing competitions in China.

Sun has held over 30 concerts in Asia and over 100 concerts around the world.

== Early life ==
Sun Nan was born in Dalian in Liaoning, China, on February 18, 1969. Sun Nan was born into a family of artists. His father was a tenor who taught bel canto and his mother, sister, and brother all participated in a dance troupe. Raised in such a family environment, Sun Nan learned to play the piano and the guitar and formed a band at an early age. Though he did not consider music to be his life's work after graduating from high school, he was soon attracted to pop songs from Hong Kong and Taiwan. Under those circumstances, he opted for a career in music and learned to sing.

== Career ==
In the 1990s, Sun was a popular singer in the Beijing music scene. He rose to international prominence after 2002.

In August 2012, Sun served on the judging panel of Asian Wave on Dragon Television. He cancelled all of his concerts in Japan during the territorial dispute of Senkaku Islands between China and Japan.

On February 17, 2015, he participated in the 2015 CCTV Spring Festival Gala and performed the song "Hands". On January, Sun took part in the third season of Hunan TV's I Am a Singer as one of the seven initial singers and a host. However, Sun withdrew from I Am a Singer due to the fact that he wanted the rest of the singers to stand a higher chance in the title. In July, he participated in Jiangsu Television's "Mongolian Song King", eventually winning. In November, he participated in the "China Star" competition airing on Dragon Television. He won the grand prize on "China Star" and subsequently traveled to the United States to participate, receiving the 58th Recording Academy's President's Merit Award.

On October 28, 2017, Sun Nan held the "Xi Xi Ya Ji" in Hangzhou's Xixi Wetland. Director Zhang Jizhong, "New Weekly" publisher Sun Wei, and other guests attended the event and released "Nan's Story" under the brand of Guoxue. This traditional craft is intended to spread the beauty of Chinese traditional culture to every Chinese person.

The documentary Amazing China ends with a song performed by Sun.

On February 15, 2018, in the 2018 CCTV Spring Festival Gala, Sun Nan and Tan Weiwei performed "New Beginning of Happiness". On March 2, he participated in the 2018 CCTV Lantern Festival and performed "New World".

On February 4, 2019, the Central Radio and Television General Station Spring Festival Gala invited Sun Nan and Zhang Jie to perform the song "The Distance of Time".

== Personal life ==
Sun Nan married Chinese actress Mai Hongmei (买红妹) in 2000. They had a daughter and a son. Due to Sun's frequent traveling for his concerts, Sun and Mai communicated less and less frequently. In 2009, Sun filed for divorce.

In 2009, Sun married hostess Pan Wei (潘蔚). Sun's interests and hobbies include Formula One, golf, and soccer; he is the captain of the Meng Zhou soccer team.

== Discography ==
- 1990: Curved Moon (弯弯的月亮)
- 1993: We're All Sad People (我们都是伤心人)
- 1995: Life after Life (生生世世)
- 1997: Understanding (认识孙楠)
- 1998: Go there and be Healed (不见不散)
- 1999: Aurora (南极光)
- 2001: Marvellous Nan (楠得精彩)
- 2002: Heaven's Destiny (缘份的天空)
- 2003: First Nan Protagonist (第一楠主角)
- 2004: Burning Fire (燃烧)
- 2005: Can't Forget You (忘不了你)
- 2009: Happiness (痛快)
- 2011: First Nan Protagonist 2011 or SUN-NAN2011 (第一楠主角2011)
- 2012: Journey (旅途)
- 2017: Wake Up, Earthlings (地球人醒来吧) with Alan Tam

== TV series theme songs ==
Sun has performed several theme songs for Chinese television series, including the following:

- "Ai Tai Nan" (爱太难) To Love is Too Difficult, Da Xi Fa theme song (China Central Television, 2012)
- "Ai Ni Ai Bu Gou" (爱你爱不够) Can't Love You Enough, Zhang Xiao Wu's Spring opening theme song (China Central Television, 2010)
- "Bi Tian Geng Gao" (比天更高) Higher than the Sky, The Prince's Education opening theme song (China Central Television, 2008)
- "He Ni Zai Yi Qi" (和你在一起) Together with You, Sword Stained with Royal Blood ending theme song (2007)
- "Dun Huang Ri Yue" (敦煌日月), The Great Dunhuang opening theme song (China Central Television, 2006)
- "Bu Mie De Xin" (不灭的心) Inextinguishable Heart, Lotus Lantern opening theme song (China Central Television, 2005)
- "Zhen Qing Zhen Mei", Legend of the Condor Heroes ending theme song, with Valen Hsu (China Central Television, 2003)
- "Zhi Yao You Ni", Young Justice Bao ending theme song, with Na Ying (2000)
- "Wu Kui Yu Xin" (无愧于心), Young Justice Bao opening theme song (2000)
- "Jin Sheng De Ai Zou Yuan" (今生的爱走远), Love Story in Shanghai ending theme song, with Ai Yu (2000)
- "Shi Fou Ai Guo Wo" (是否爱过我), Love Story in Shanghai opening theme song (2000)

== Notable achievements ==
Sun has had numerous notable achievements early on in his career:

- 1987 to 1989: Beijing coal mine Art
- 1990 to 1991: Dalian Churos
- 1991 to 1993: The central song and dance ensemble (Gu Jianfen Art Center)
- 1990: Sun's first album, Curved Moon, was released by Guangdong Media Publishing House
- 1992: Sun Nan went to Hong Kong as one of the ten most popular singers in China. (The other nine members were: Na Ying, Xie Xiaodong, Mao Amin, Cai Guoqing, Cheng Fangyuan, Yang Yuying, Tao Jin, Xie Jin, and Teng Geer.)
- 1992: Sun Nan held six concerts "The night of Sun Nan" in Indonesia, and that was the first time a Chinese pop singer can hold a concert in another country.
- 1993: Sun Nan joined Music Impact Ltd. (Taiwan), other artists including Andy Liu, Tony Leung Chiu-Wai, Rosamund Kwan, Max Mok, Leo Ku discography, Serene Koong.

== Awards ==
- 1996 Ten golden song Awards: Most Popular Chinese Song of the Year
- 1997 The song 《淡淡的忧》 became the Top ten songs of 1997 in China
- 2001 CCTV-MTV Music Festival: The mainland's most popular male singer (3rd)
- 2002 CCTV-MTV Music Festival: The mainland's most popular male singer (4th)
- 2004 Pepsi Music Chart "Golden song" and "Male singer of the year"
- 2008 Ten golden song Awards: Most popular Chinese song of the year
- 2008 TVB ten golden song Awards " The best pop singer of Mainland China"
- 2010 CCTV-MTV Music Festival: The mainland's most popular male singer (Sun was the first person to win this award three times)
- 2012 The Knowledge China "Special Contribution of the year"

== Concerts ==
- Marvellous Nan Tour (2001)
- Concert in Changchun
- Concert in Dalian
- Concert in Shanghai
- Nan Era Music Festival (2009)
- Concert in Beijing
- Concert in Wuxi
- Concert in Shenzhen
