= NASCAR 3D: The IMAX Experience =

2004 film

- Theatrical release poster
- Directed by: Simon Wincer
- Written by: Mark Bechtel (narration)
- Produced by: Lorne Orleans; Douglas "Disco" Hylton
- Starring: Jimmie Johnson; Ryan Newman; Mike Helton
- Narrated by: Kiefer Sutherland
- Cinematography: James Neihouse
- Edited by: Terry Blythe
- Music by: Eric Colvin
- Production company: IMAX Corporation
- Distributed by: Warner Bros. Pictures
- Release date: March 12, 2004
- Running time: 48 minutes
- Country: United States
- Language: English
- Box office: $22 million

NASCAR 3D: The IMAX Experience is a 2004 American IMAX 3D documentary film directed by Simon Wincer and narrated by Kiefer Sutherland. The film provides an educational overview of the origins, evolution, and current state of the American motorsport NASCAR. It also explains how the sport works, from the rules, to the aerodynamics, the various tasks the teams take on to prepare for each race weekend, and the risks NASCAR drivers experience during every race. It was released on March 12, 2004, by Warner Bros. Pictures, and was the first IMAX film to be distributed by Warner Bros.

While a small amount of the film uses archival TV broadcast footage of NASCAR races from the past, several scenes were filmed with IMAX cameras at actual NASCAR Winston Cup Series races during the 2003 season. Other racing scenes, which did not take place during actual races, had cameras on, or in the race cars, or on the track. The film was advertised to be sponsored by AOL for Broadband. The #30 Winston Cup Series Chevrolet Monte Carlo race car of Jeff Green and then later Steve Park– which was primarily sponsored by AOL during the 2003 season– is prominently featured in various shots of the film, as well as its promotional material. In the 2004 Cup Series season, the same car, then-driven by Johnny Sauter, had a special design to promote the film at the March 7 race at Las Vegas Motor Speedway, and once more at the May 2 race at Infineon Raceway.

A soundtrack released alongside the film consisted of licensed songs and its original score by Eric Colvin. Some time after its original run at IMAX theaters, NASCAR 3D was released on DVD, and included bonus features, such as a compilation of close finishes in the history of NASCAR's top three racing divisions- the Winston Cup Series, the Busch Series, and the Craftsman Truck Series.
