= Wade Sanders =

American attorney and Navy captain

Wade Rowland Sanders
- Military career
- Allegiance: United States of America
- Branch: United States Navy
- Rank: Captain
- Conflicts: Vietnam
- Awards: Purple Heart, Bronze Star
- Other work: Government; politics

Wade Sanders is an attorney from San Diego, California, and a retired United States Navy captain who served as Deputy Assistant United States Secretary of the Navy for Reserve Affairs during the Clinton Administration. He was formerly California Lt. Gov. John Garamendi's senior adviser for veterans and military affairs. As an attorney, he specialized in the legal practice of corporate governance and ethics, as well as employee owned companies and lobbying for major corporations. In December 2008, he pleaded guilty to one charge of possession of child pornography and served almost three years in prison. On January 9, 2013, he was disbarred.

== Early life and education ==
Sanders is the son of a career U.S. Navy officer who was injured while serving aboard the USS Pensacola, and Mary Houston, an artist.

Sanders received his Bachelor of Arts from California State University, Long Beach, his Juris Doctor from the University of San Diego School of Law, and is a graduate of the Naval War College. He also attended Harvard Kennedy School at Harvard University.

== Career ==
=== Government and politics ===
Sanders was the senior adviser for veterans and military affairs to John Garamendi, D-Calif., while Garamendi served as California's lieutenant governor in 2008.

A former Deputy Assistant United States Secretary of the Navy for Reserve Affairs during the Clinton Administration, he contributed to post-Cold War restructuring and modernization of the Armed Forces of the United States and worked with the United States Secretary of Defense to achieve full integration of the Reserve and Guard Components of the U.S. Military.

Sanders sat on the board of the non-profit organization Vietnam Veterans of San Diego. He was a member of the San Diego Police Department Senior Oversight Committee and briefly ran for the United States Congress as a Democrat in 2000 before dropping out of the race, citing a lack of funding.

During the 2004 presidential campaign, Sanders made an appearance in the documentary Going Upriver: The Long War of John Kerry (2004), and made public rebuttals to criticisms of Kerry's war record made by the group Swift Boat Veterans for Truth.

=== Navy ===
A combat veteran of the Vietnam War, where he served as Swift Boat skipper, PCF-98 and retired reserve Navy captain, Sanders served nearly thirty years of active and reserve Naval service and received the Bronze Star, the Purple Heart, and in 1992 was awarded the Silver Star. In August 2010, Navy Secretary Ray Mabus stripped Sanders of the Silver Star. According to a Navy spokesperson, "Had the subsequently determined facts and evidence surrounding both the incident for which the award was made and the processing of the award itself been known to the secretary of the Navy in 1992, those facts would have prevented the award of the Silver Star."

Sanders is the author of many published articles and opinion pieces in major newspapers and the Navy Institute Proceeding, and served as a columnist for Military.com and a television commentator on national security matters and the war in Iraq for NBC and Fox.

== Personal life ==
On December 22, 2008, Sanders pleaded guilty to one felony charge of possession of images of minors engaged in sexually explicit conduct, before the U.S. District Court for the Southern District of California in San Diego. Investigators found eight videos in addition to individual photos containing child pornography on Sanders' computers. On May 4, 2009, Sanders was sentenced by U.S. District Court Judge Thomas Whelan to 37 months in prison. He was released from federal prison on March 16, 2012.

On January 9, 2013, Sanders was disbarred by the California Bar.
