= George Butler (filmmaker) =

British filmmaker (1943–2021)

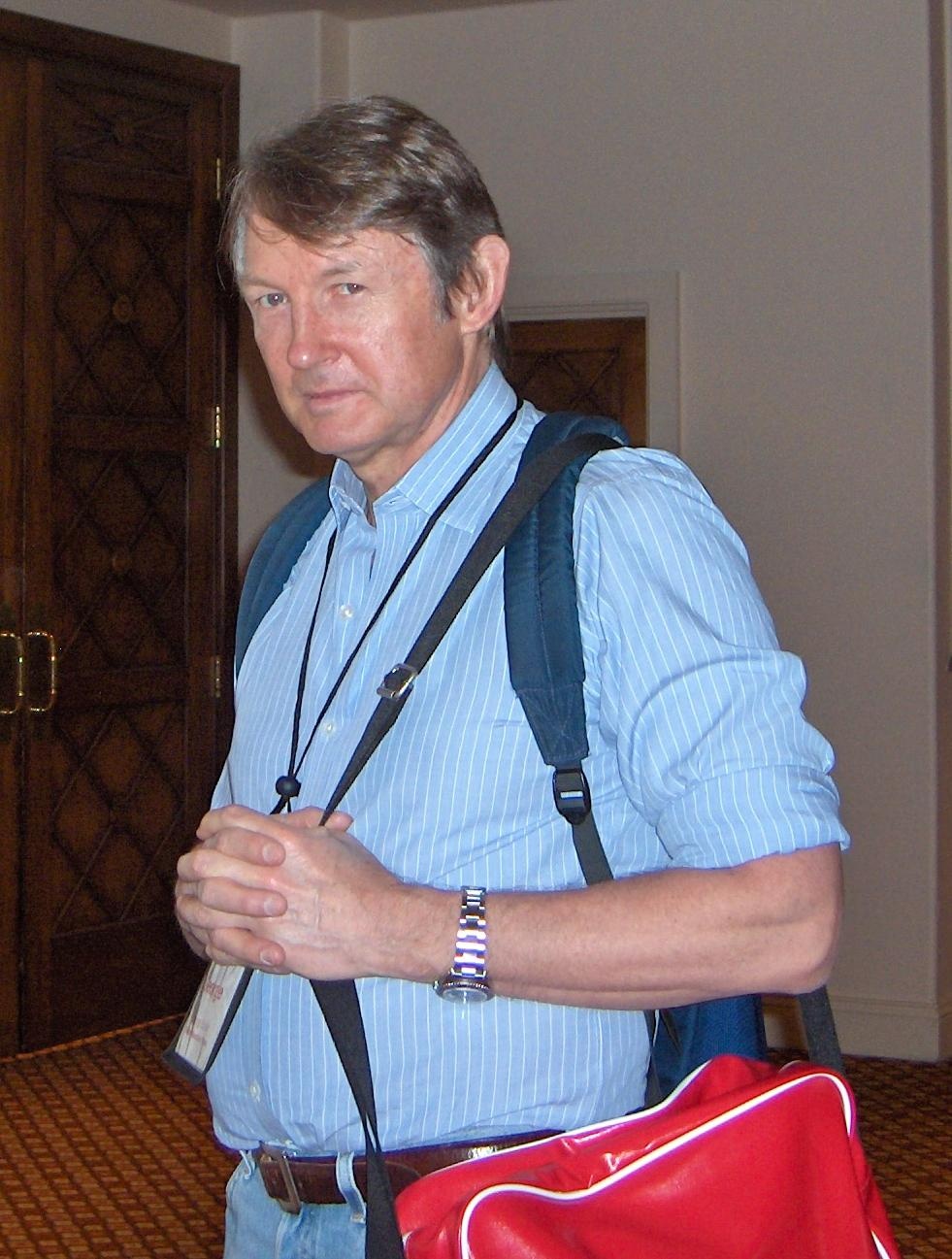
- Butler in 2004
- Born: 12 October 1943; Chester, England
- Died: 21 October 2021 (aged 78); Holderness, New Hampshire, U.S.
- Education: University of North Carolina at Chapel Hill; Hollins College
- Occupations: Filmmaker; photographer

George Tyssen Butler (12 October 1943 – 21 October 2021) was a British-American filmmaker and photographer, and a pioneer of the theatrical documentary. Some of his most popular films include Pumping Iron (1977), which introduced a wider audience to Arnold Schwarzenegger, The Endurance films, retelling Sir Ernest Shackleton's saga of Antarctic survival, and Going Upriver: The Long War of John Kerry (2004), about his friend John Kerry's leadership in the peace movement.

Butler's films are known for their combination of high artistic, educational and entertainment values, as he believed well-crafted documentaries can hold their own against dramatic features. In addition to his feature-length documentary classics, Butler has also produced acclaimed IMAX features, such as the award-winning Shackleton's Antarctic Adventure (2001) and Roving Mars (2006).

== Early life ==
Born in Chester, England on 12 October 1943, Butler grew up in Somalia, Kenya, and Jamaica, the son of Dorothy (West) and Tyssen Desmond Butler. His father was a British Army officer and his mother was an American Boston Brahmin socialite. Butler jokingly described himself as "half American, half Irish, and half English."

Butler attended the Groton School before graduating from University of North Carolina at Chapel Hill in 1966. He received a Master of Arts degree in creative writing from Hollins College in 1968.

== Career ==
After completing his M.A. degree, Butler worked as a reporter for Newsweek. Objecting to the Vietnam War, he joined VISTA (the domestic Peace Corps) as a volunteer, working in the inner city of Detroit's North End, where he established a successful community newspaper, The Oakland Lion. The author of a number of books, Butler collaborated with David Thorne and former Secretary of State John Kerry on The New Soldier (1971), a highly praised book about the Vietnam Veterans Against War.

In 1972, a photo assignment for Life magazine to cover the Mr. Universe Championship inspired Butler to make a theatrical documentary on the subject of bodybuilding; this proved to be a challenging undertaking, as he had difficulty convincing potential investors that bodybuilders and their Austrian-accented star performer could hold the screen. The eventual movie Pumping Iron launched Arnold Schwarzenegger, put bodybuilding and the gym business on the map, and became a film classic. With Pumping Iron, George Butler established White Mountain Films, named for the White Mountains of New Hampshire, where he made his home.

White Mountain Films has gone on to create some of the most commercially successful and critically acclaimed documentaries made. Butler's films have screened at festivals such as Sundance, Telluride, Toronto, Leningrad and Full Frame, and won honors ranging from National Board of Review Best Documentary of the Year (2001, The Endurance), IDA Best Documentary finalist (1990, In the Blood), the Whitney Biennial (2006, Going Upriver), National Academy of Science Best Science Film of the Year (2008, Roving Mars) to the Warner Prize for Best Director, Environmental Film Festival (2015, Tiger Tiger).

A lifelong conservationist (The Lord God Bird, In the Blood), Butler created Tiger Tiger as both a feature documentary (completed in 2015) and an IMAX film (shown in 2024). Both versions followed world-renowned big-cat biologist Dr. Alan Rabinowitz as he traveled into the mangrove forests of the Sundarbans, searching for royal Bengal tigers—one of the world's largest remaining tiger populations.

== Photography ==
Butler's photographs have appeared in many major publications including Time, Smithsonian, Vogue, Newsweek, Sports Illustrated, Vanity Fair and The New York Times. His work has been showcased in a one-man show at the International Center of Photography in New York, and exhibited in the Detroit collection, among other galleries around the country. Additionally, Butler is known for his life-size portraits of Arnold Schwarzenegger.

== Unfinished projects ==
Reportedly, Butler's White Mountain Films was also developing a medical thriller probing the mystery of how "shell shock" affects the brains of soldiers and veterans. The project is based on author Caroline Alexander's National Geographic cover story.

== Personal life ==
Butler, who had been battling Parkinson's disease, died from pneumonia at his farm in Holderness, New Hampshire, on 21 October 2021, at the age of 78.

== Filmography ==
- Pumping Iron (1977)
- Pumping Iron II: The Women (1985)
- In the Blood (1989)
- The Endurance: Shackleton's Legendary Antarctic Expedition (2000)
- Shackleton's Antarctic Adventure (2001)
- Going Upriver (2004)
- Roving Mars (2006)
- The Lord God Bird (2008)
- The Good Fight (2010)
- Tiger, Tiger (2015)
- Tiger, Tiger: The IMAX Experience (upcoming)
