= Bugs! A Rainforest Adventure =

2003 IMAX film

Bugs! A Rainforest Adventure is a 2003 IMAX film documenting insect life in the rainforests of Borneo. The movie has a 40-minute runtime and is narrated by Judi Dench. The movie depicts Hierodula and Papilio species, amongst many others. The film was shot in Image Quest 3D.

== Reception ==
According to Dave McGinn of The Globe and Mail, the film has "fantastic visuals", including "a tiny white egg on a lush green leaf, an extreme close-up of the wings of a newly hatched butterfly, [and] bugs flitting across the screen, magnified up to 250,000 their normal size". The Edmonton Journal reviewer Mari Sasano thought that the magnified viewing of the bugs is "dramatic" and, along with Judi Dench's narration, gives the film "an air of class". Patric Evans of the Toronto Star called Bugs! A Rainforest Adventure "a kid-friendly mix of cute and gross" that shows a caterpillar chomping on a leaf and producing "sweet little crunching" sounds as well as a mantis consuming the head of a fly.
