= New World (Sun Nan song) =

Song by Sun Nan
- Released: October 1, 2017
- Songwriter: Wen Yi

"New World" (Chinese: 新的天地) is a song about the development of China and its transformation, composed by Sun Nan and written by Wen Yi. The song was released on October 1, 2017 and was the theme song of the China Central Television documentary Glorious China, sung by Sun Nan.

According to Sun, the song "chronicles the great achievements of the new era", representing the changes and progress in China with a lighter style of music than is typical of patriotic themes. The song has been used again since its release in subsequent national celebrations and events.

== Creation ==
In 2017, China Central Television planned to shoot a documentary called Glorious China to record the changes in Chinese society since the 18th CCP National Congress. After the film was completed, the director approached composer Sun Nan, hoping to convey the confidence of the Chinese people through the documentary. After Sun Nan took on the task, he went to Shenzhen and Shanghai for field research and contacted singer Sun Nan, with whom he had worked for many years, to sing the song. Sun Nan also deliberately chose a popular singing style to fit the people, and used a "silent and subtle way of expression" to describe the changes in Chinese society. Two months later, he provided the director with two different versions of the song for selection. At first, the crew was more satisfied with the first version, but after Sun Nan re-recorded it, the director chose the second version as the theme song. On October 1, 2017, New World was released as a single.

== Performance occasions ==
The song has been sung on many occasions, including the Chinese Communist Party's anniversary and the National Day of the People's Republic of China. In addition, many contestants in vocal competitions have chosen to sing New World.

- 2018 Gala to celebrate the 40th anniversary of reform and opening up
- 2019 CCTV Spring Festival Gala
- 2019 Celebration of the 70th anniversary of the People's Republic of China
- The 2021 cultural performance The Great Journey to celebrate the 100th Anniversary of the Chinese Communist Party was performed in the form of drums, music, singing and dancing.
- In 2021, the 100th anniversary celebration of the founding of the Chinese Communist Party was held, with composer Sun Nan serving as music director.
