= Michael Jordan to the Max =

2000 film directed by Don Kempf and James D. Stern

- Directed by: Don Kempf; James D. Stern
- Written by: Jonathan Hock
- Produced by: Don Kempf; Steve Kempf; Estee Portnoy; James D. Stern
- Starring: Michael Jordan
- Narrated by: Laurence Fishburne
- Cinematography: James Neihouse
- Edited by: Jonathan Hock
- Music by: John Debney
- Distributed by: Giant Screen Films
- Release date: May 5, 2000
- Running time: 46 minutes
- Country: United States
- Language: English
- Box office: $21.5 million

Michael Jordan to the Max is a 2000 American IMAX documentary film produced and directed by Don Kempf and James D. Stern. The film is about the life and career of basketball player Michael Jordan, focusing mainly on his 1998 NBA Playoffs and other significant achievements in his career. It is narrated by Laurence Fishburne.

The film includes appearances by numerous celebrities and professional athletes including Phil Jackson, Doug Collins, Bob Costas, Bill Murray, Ken Griffey Jr., Steve Kerr, Spike Lee, Willie Mays, Stan Musial, Ahmad Rashad, and Pat Riley.

== Release ==
The film was released on May 5, 2000. 20 years later, it was remastered and re-released to IMAX theaters.

== Reception ==
On the review aggregator website Rotten Tomatoes, 65% of 26 critics' reviews are positive, with an average rating of 6.4/10. Metacritic, which uses a weighted average, assigned the film a score of 57 out of 100, based on 15 critics, indicating "mixed or average" reviews.

Robert Koehler of Variety wrote that the film is "an honorific but unmoving portrait of the Chicago Bulls' No. 23."

Roger Ebert of the Chicago Sun-Times gave it two out of four stars and wrote, "Michael Jordan to the Max, like almost everything that has been filmed or written about Jordan, is essentially just a promotional film for Jordan as a product. It plays like a commercial for itself."

A. O. Scott of The New York Times wrote, "It's an entertaining, intermittently thrilling 45 minutes, but nothing compared to what the man himself could do in 48."

== See also ==
- List of basketball films
