= Sea Monsters: A Prehistoric Adventure =

- DVD cover
- Directed by: Sean MacLeod Phillips
- Written by: Mose Richards
- Narrated by: Liev Schreiber
- Edited by: Jonathan P. Shaw
- Music by: Richard Evans; David Rhodes; Peter Gabriel
- Production company: National Geographic Films
- Distributed by: National Geographic
- Release date: October 5, 2007
- Running time: 40 minutes
- Country: United States
- Language: English

Sea Monsters: A Prehistoric Adventure, also known as Sea Monsters, is a 2007 American IMAX 3D documentary film produced by National Geographic, featuring marine reptiles. The film alternates between present-day sequences documenting scientists' research and computer-animated reconstructions of prehistoric marine environments.

Sea Monsters received generally positive reviews from critics, whereas its tie-in video game, released 20 days after the film's premiere, was heavily criticized.

== Plot ==
The documentary covers prehistoric ocean organisms and includes animation as well as digital recreations.

=== Prehistory segments ===
The protagonist of the story is Dolly, a female Dolichorhynchops who travels the Kansas Inland Sea with her family, 80 million years ago during the late Cretaceous period.

They encounter various creatures, including, Tylosaurus, Xiphactinus, Cretoxyrhina, and Ammonites.

Dolly gets attacked by a shark (Squalicorax) after her mother was killed by another shark (Cretoxyrhina). Dolly survives due to a passing Tylosaurus killing the shark, albeit with a tooth embedded in her flipper. Later, Dolly's brother is swallowed whole by a young Tylosaurus, who in turn is killed by a larger member of its kind, leaving Dolly alone. Dolly survives to adulthood and goes on to have young of her very own. After seasons of traveling around the Inland sea, Dolly finally dies peacefully of old age.

=== Live-action segments ===
- South Australia, 2002: Two paleontologists in the Australian Outback discovered plesiosaurs, 95% of them juveniles.
- Central Texas, 1980: A road crew near Austin, Texas, discover ammonite fossils in a quarry. During the Cretaceous, Texas was underwater and the quarry was part of the Permian Basin.
- Western Kansas, 1918: Charles Sternberg and his sons Levi and George discover a 29-foot-long Tylosaurus that had a Dolichorhynchops in it.
- Phosphate Mine, Negev Desert, Israel, 1998: A quarry in Europe reveals a mosasaur skull.
- Western Kansas, 1952: George Sternberg, Charles's older son, makes a discovery in Gove County, Kansas. A 13-foot-long Xiphactinus containing, below the ribs, a 6-foot-long fish, a Gillicus, which took up about half of the length of the Xiphactinus, killing it instantly.
- North Dakota, 1995: Two amateur collectors go into a cave in North Dakota, and find a wealth of teeth from sharks, specifically Cretoxyrhina and Squalicorax.
- The Netherlands, 1998: A Dutch quarry reveals a mosasaur skeleton with bite marks from sharks.
- South Dakota, 1978: The Badlands National Park, in Rapid City, South Dakota, reveals a Tylosaurus skeleton that had eaten multiple creatures in one meal.

== Creatures featured ==
- Ammonite
- Baculites (identified as "straight-shelled ammonites")
- Bananogmius, an extinct genus of bony fish
- Caproberyx, an extinct genus of bony fish
- Cretoxyrhina, a large shark
- Dolichorhynchops (often shortened to "dollies" in the story), a genus of plesiosaur and the main animal in the film.
- Enchodus, an extinct genus of bony fish
- Gillicus, a relatively small, 2-meter long ichthyodectid fish
- Gorgosaurus, a genus of tyrannosaurid theropod dinosaur
- Henodus (cameo), a placodont with an elaborate shell of the Late Triassic period
- Hesperornis, an extinct genus of flightless aquatic birds
- Inoceramus, an extinct genus of giant clam
- Jellyfish (live-acted)
- Kronosaurus (cameo), an extinct genus of short-necked pliosaur
- Leptecodon, a genus of prehistoric fish
- Nothosaurus (cameo), an extinct genus of sauropterygian reptile
- Platecarpus, an extinct genus of aquatic lizard belonging to the mosasaur family
- Protosphyraena, a fossil genus of swordfish-like marine fish
- Protostega, an extinct species of marine turtle
- Pteranodon, one of the largest pterosaur genera
- Squalicorax, a genus of extinct lamniform shark
- Styxosaurus, a genus of plesiosaur of the family Elasmosauridae
- Temnodontosaurus (cameo), a big ichthyosaur
- Tusoteuthis, a genus of Cretaceous cephalopod molluscs
- Tylosaurus, a giant mosasaur
- Uintacrinus (identified as "crinoid"), a floating colonial crinoid
- Xiphactinus, a 4.5 to 5 m (15 to 16 ft) long predatory bony fish

== Soundtrack ==
The film's ambient soundtrack was composed by Richard Evans. David Rhodes and Peter Gabriel performed the end credits song "Different Stories Different Lives". The soundtrack has never been officially released.

== Release ==
The film was released on October 5, 2007. It was promoted with a line of toys from Wild Republic. It won the "Outstanding Visual Effects in a Special Venue Project" award at the Visual Effects Society Awards 2007.

=== Reception ===
The film earned a 100% "Fresh" rating from 12 positive reviews on Rotten Tomatoes. John Anderson of Variety wrote "the science seems sound and the story is exciting", and found it superior to 3D films that merely use the extra dimension as a gimmick. Matt Seitz of The New York Times was impressed by the digital spectacle. The Seattle Times, Orlando Sentinel and Chicago Tribune were of much the same mind.

== Video game ==
Sea Monsters: A Prehistoric Adventure was made into a game by DSI Games and published by Zoo Digital Publishing. It was released on the Wii, PlayStation 2 and Nintendo DS on October 25, 2007. Players can control Henodus, Temnodontosaurus, Tylosaurus, Dolichorhynchops, Nothosaurus and a species exclusive to the game called Thalassomedon in an open-world setting, with no fixed goal besides collecting all the hidden fossils.

Unlike the film it's based on, the game received overwhelmingly negative reviews across all platforms due to multiple factors.

== See also ==
- Walking with Dinosaurs
- Sea Monsters (TV series)
- Walking with Monsters
- List of films featuring dinosaurs
- List of highest-grossing documentary films
