= The Eruption of Mount St. Helens! =

1980 film

- DVD cover
- Directed by: George Casey
- Written by: George Casey
- Produced by: George Casey; Ammiel G. Najar; Paul Novros
- Narrated by: Robert Foxworth
- Cinematography: James Neihouse
- Music by: Michael Stearns
- Production company: Graphic Films
- Release date: 1980
- Running time: 25 minutes
- Country: United States
- Language: English

The Eruption of Mount St. Helens! is a 1980 American short documentary film directed by George Casey.

== Accolades ==
It was nominated for an Academy Award for Best Documentary Short at the 53rd Academy Awards a year later. It was the first 15/70 film to be nominated with such an honor.

== Home media ==
It was released on DVD by SlingShot Entertainment May 23, 2000.

== See also ==
- 1980 eruption of Mount St. Helens
