= Michael Perfit =

American geologist

Michael Roger Perfit (born 1949) is an American geologist who is currently an emeritus distinguished professor at the University of Florida.

Perfit graduated from St. Lawrence University in 1971, and earned a master's degree and Ph.D. from Columbia University in 1974 and 1977, respectively. After working for five years as a research fellow at the Australian National University, he joined the University of Florida faculty in 1982. He is a Fellow of the Geological Society of America, elected in 2008 for "his distinguished contributions in marine geology and igneous petrology."

He has published over 150 professional papers and articles as well as two books – one is a children's book written and illustrated with Perfit's college roommate, Don Brown, - entitled “Older Than Dirt: A Wild but True History of Earth”. The other is an academic book that focuses mainly on the exploration of the deep ocean floor, mid-ocean ridges, deep sea volcanism and hydrothermalism, and the structure and composition of oceanic crust. The highly illustrated book is entitled “Discovering the Deep: A Photographic Atlas of the Seafloor” by Jeff Karson, Deb Kelley, Dan Fornari, Mike Perfit and Tim Shank.

== Selected publications ==
- Brown, Don; Perfit, Mike (2017). Older Than Dirt: A Wild but True History of Earth. Houghton Mifflin Harcourt. ISBN 9780544805033. LCCN 2016018643.
- Karson, Jeffrey A.; Kelley, Deborah S.; Fornari, Daniel J.; Perfit, Michael R.; Shank, Timothy M. (2015). Discovering the Deep: A Photographic Atlas of the Seafloor and Ocean Crust. Cambridge University Press. ISBN 978-0-521-85718-5. LCCN 2014028680. In 2016, this book received a PROSE Award from the Association of American Publishers.
- Lowell, Robert P.; Seewald, Jeffrey S.; Metaxas, Anna; Perfit, Michael R., eds. (2013). Magma to Microbe: Modeling Hydrothermal Processes at Oceanic Spreading Centers. American Geophysical Union, Geophysical Monograph Series. Vol. 178. John Wiley & Sons.
