= Hidden Universe 3D =

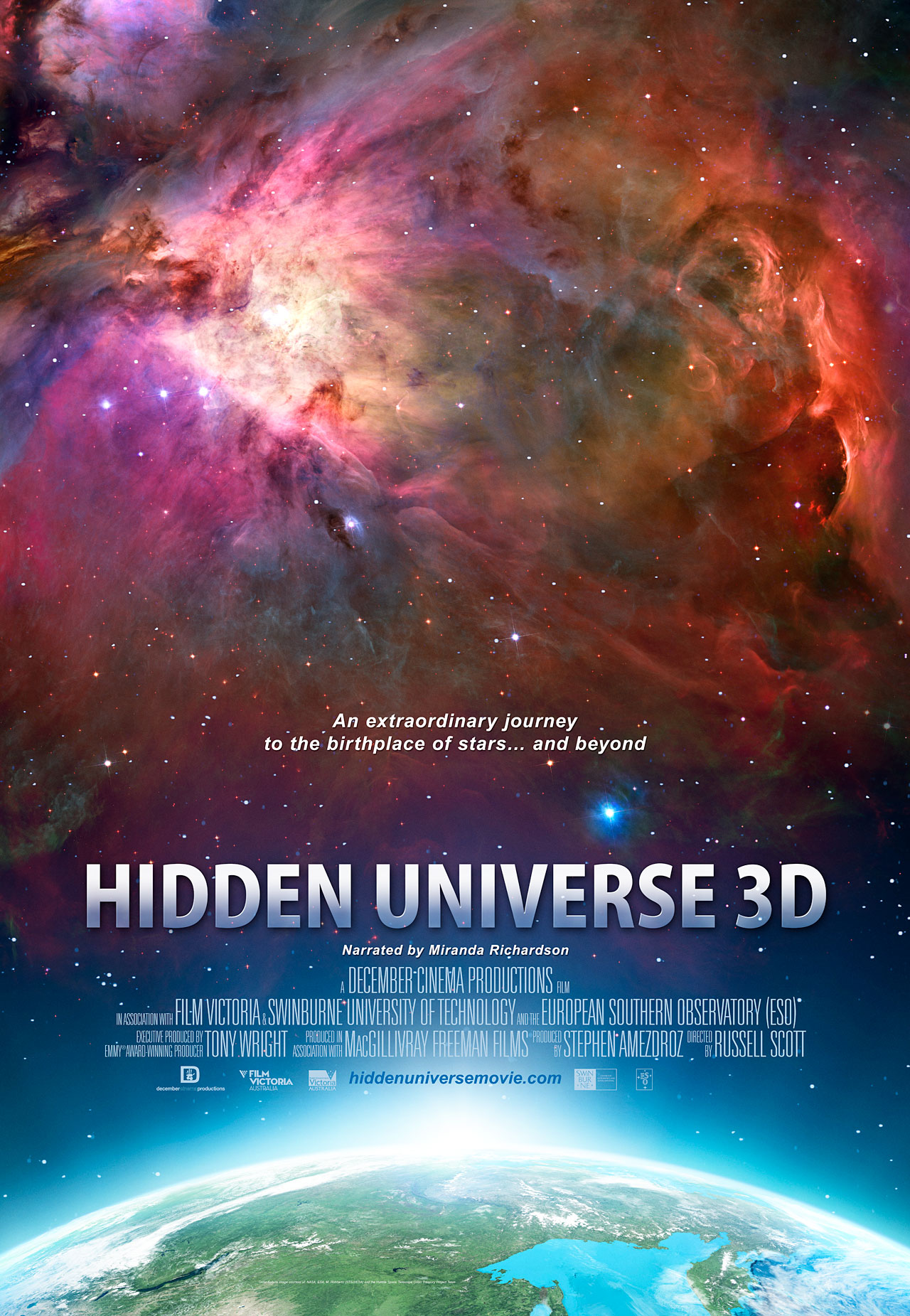
- Directed by: Russell Scott
- Written by: Russell Scott
- Narrated by: Miranda Richardson
- Release date: 5 September 2013
- Country: Australia
- Language: English

Hidden Universe 3D is a 2013 Australian documentary written and directed by Russell Scott. The film is narrated by Golden Globe winner Miranda Richardson and was released to IMAX 3D theaters in 2013.

== Description ==
This documentary takes audiences on a journey deep into space through real images captured by the world's most powerful telescopes. High-resolution images of space allow moviegoers to explore the earliest galaxies, watch stars being born in vivid clouds of gas and dust, tour the surface of Mars and witness images of distant celestial structures including stunning views of the Sun. These new images offer fresh insight into the origins and evolution of the universe.

The movie is produced by December Cinema Productions in association with Film Victoria, Swinburne University of Technology, and the European Southern Observatory (ESO).
