= Australia: Land Beyond Time =

2002 IMAX film

Australia: Land Beyond Time is a 2002 IMAX film documenting the natural environment of Australia. The film has a 40-minute runtime. The film was captured by pilot/filmmaker David Flatman on a two-engine kit plane. The film depicts natural landmarks such as Lake Eyre and Uluru. It was written by Les Murray, scored by David Bridie, and narrated by Alex Scott.
