= The New Soldier =

- 1971 first edition cover of The New Soldier; Raising the flag upside down in the universal sign of distress
- Author: Vietnam Veterans Against the War and John Kerry
- Cover artist: George Butler
- Language: English
- Publisher: The Macmillan Company
- Publication date: October 30, 1971
- Publication place: United States
- Media type: Print (hardcover and paperback)
- Pages: 174 (first edition); 174 (paperback)
- ISBN: 978-0-02-073610-3
- OCLC: 195273

The New Soldier was published as both a hard and soft cover book in October, 1971, by Vietnam Veterans Against the War. Principally a photographic essay accompanied by text, the work was edited by David Thorne and George Butler, with a section written by John Kerry. The work includes photographs captured by many photographers across five days in April, 1971.

== Overview ==
The New Soldier documents what VVAW called Operation Dewey Canyon III. This pseudo-operation, "a limited incursion into the country of Congress", was basically a series of demonstrations, marches and street theatre designed to protest US involvement in the war in Vietnam. In one activity, Vietnam War combat veterans, wearing uniforms and carrying unloaded weapons, enacted for astonished visitors to Washington, DC, the actions common to descending upon and sweeping a Vietnamese village for enemy combatants. This theatre was performed on Constitution Mall, under heavy police supervision. This was only one of several events participated in by hundreds of Vietnam Veterans and not a few Gold Star Mothers from across the country.

The New Soldier documents two events of emotional significance. In one, war veterans queue up in a long line to return their medals and decorations to the U.S. government. They hurled them upon the steps of Congress. This was a shocking scene on American television.

A second event was a worship service held at the main gate to Arlington National Cemetery. The desire had been to hold the service on the actual hallowed grounds but the Vietnam Veteran demonstrators were locked out of Arlington. Marines guarded the gates with loaded weapons and kept them pointed outward. The worship service had to be conducted with the clergyman's back to those Marines. To some readers, a shortcoming of The New Soldier is that the words spoken by this Vietnam War battlefield chaplain, a United Methodist clergyman, were not included in the volume. That sermonette has not been lost to American history (see link below).

The book contains excerpts of testimony by veterans at the Winter Soldier Investigation on war crimes committed during the Vietnam War and a portion of the Fulbright Hearing testimony given by John Kerry to the Senate committee.

The New Soldier documents a most unusual event in American history: returned veterans of a foreign war appearing en masse in the nation's capital to demand that the war be stopped. Only 5000 copies of the book were printed, consequently, the book is considered a collector's item.
