= Chicken Ranch (film) =

1982 film

- Directed by: Sandi Sissel; Nick Broomfield
- Produced by: Nick Broomfield
- Cinematography: Sandi Sissel
- Edited by: Julian Ware
- Distributed by: First Run Features
- Release date: September 1982
- Running time: 74 minutes
- Language: English

Chicken Ranch is a 1982 British documentary film directed by Nick Broomfield and Sandi Sissel. Its subject is the Chicken Ranch, a legalized brothel in Pahrump, Nevada. It was produced by Broomfield and photographed by Sissel.

The documentary, which remains purely observational for the most part, depicts the prostitutes as likeable characters often looking for a way out of the remote location where the brothel is situated. The film shows the girls lining up for potential clients, joking about their job, and interacting with one another within the brothel.

== Synopsis ==
The documentary begins without narration as a plane lands down in the remote part of the desert where Chicken Ranch is situated while a number from the Broadway musical based on the Texas situated Ranch is played. Before the documentary scenes begin, we are advised that the women working at Chicken Ranch only work for three weeks out of the month and that their earnings are split 50/50 with the owner (plus rent).

Our introduction to the Ranch is of the girls being led into the parlor (client greeting area) to be lined up in front of two potential clients for choosing. In another room, Madame Fran busily takes calls and quotes services to a client over the telephone. The camera goes from room to room following the daily routines of the girls as they put makeup on and get dressed up provocatively. Ranch owner Walter Plankinton walks around trying to influence the girls to dress and be styled more exquisitely than what the clients left at home but is disregarded by all the women in the room.

While there are several women in the ranch that share the camera time, the documentary itself focuses frequently on two particular young prostitutes, Mandy and Connie. Mandy is the typical busty blonde, doing well for herself and seeming to connect well to her clients whereas alternatively, Connie is finding it harder and harder to work in the Ranch due to her growing dislike of being used by men.

In a brief scene of Claudia and Connie doing their makeup and getting ready for work, they discuss their 'previous lives' before coming to the Ranch, both revealing they have come from bad relationships with men. In the parlor, Mandy and J.J. are running around the table enjoying a momentary lighter side of life.

A small group of Japanese tourists arrive, led by a travel agent who is the only one who can speak English and interpret. After several moments of the uncomfortable language barrier and not understanding the rules, Madame Fran gets irritable and direct and encourages the men to pick a lady. Most of the girls are chosen, the remaining few (including Connie) sit in the parlor with the remainder of the tour. Connie engages the travel agent in conversation but is unable to get a client to take her to her room.

During a cigarette break, Connie, Linda and Diane discuss their strategies and techniques (so-called 'tricks of the trade') and have candid discussions about what they hate. Connie reveals why she is growing to hate men so much and explains that her technique is to use her hand to get a man off as quickly as she can so that if possible, there doesn't actually need to be any intercourse at all (as clients are being too rough with her and she doesn't like to be hurt).

Two French journalists arrive while the girls are still in the process of waking up. One girl admits that she has nightmares if a client disappoints her while Mandy admits that she had a nightmare that a client cut her head off. Madame Fran is seen giving the girls access to the normally locked cabinet to retrieve their contraceptive pills, vitamins and other medications revealing the Ranch's strict policy on drugs, alcohol and medicating responsibly. Brothel owner Walter Plankinton gives an interview to the French journalists in the parlor of the Ranch and talks righteously about the services they provide to the public is a 'form of love'. Claudia and J.J. show the journalists to one of the rooms with a specialist 'passion chair' which allows for thirty-two different positions, some of which they demonstrate for the camera.

Following the interview, Walter and Fran confront their 'ladies' about them running a game where they try to get the men in and out of their bedrooms as quick as possible. The group of Japanese tourists have reported the ladies for servicing them in ten minutes flat. After Walter explains that the prices were raised on the tours and now that the girls are earning $64 per trick, the girls are gently warned off and that if these situations continue to occur, a clock will be set each time they take a new client to ensure the man gets what he pays for. The camera focuses briefly on Connie who tries to hide she is visibly annoyed.

A middle-aged client who is employed as a long-distance trucker arrives and chooses Mandy for her services – in the bedroom they privately discuss the price and variety of what she can offer him. He is advised for straight sex it would be a couple of hundred dollars, but he wants services for under fifty. He claims he can't afford anything more than sixty dollars and her desperation to get the client's money leads her to agreeing to straight sex for twenty minutes for sixty dollars. In the office area, Fran is seen counting the money and noting down income.

Connie is taken to the parlor area by owner Walter for a discussion. Connie is told her services have suddenly fallen out of demand and that her intake the previous week had been almost $2000 whereas now her income has fallen dramatically because no one is booking her. Connie – normally quite in control of her emotions – lets her walls drop and begins to weep admitting she's not particularly sure why men no longer want to be with her and she wants Walter to tell her why he thinks that is. Walter gently suggests that he suspects that something in her attitude is turning men off (if he knows Connie is behind the strategy of quickly getting men off before intercourse can occur, it remains unmentioned) but he suggests she take her week off to pull herself together and get her confidence back.

J.J. and Claudia are seen in a bedroom smoking marijuana and keeping an eye out for Fran or Walter. The two have a fight with deodorant cans afterwards trying to hide the smell of smoke.

Connie and Linda are sitting in one of the rooms talking. The conversation begins with Connie determining if she should straighten out her hair or not as she thinks it is hurting her desirability. Linda admits openly that when she first saw Connie's frizzy hair that she personally thought the girl would never make money in their trade. Connie explains that after her time off if she returns and Walter is still at the Ranch, then she won't stay as she 'can't handle him'. It is revealed through the discussion that Walter is starting to sexually harass Connie since her last return and she can't take it as she was always taught to never have sex with an employer. Connie admits she would like to leave the Ranch and go travelling or go to college but to do either it takes money which means doing what she does. The conversation concludes with Connie deciding she will eventually straighten her hair as it has to be the reason she isn't booking clients.

Diane begs for Fran's help with a client known as Buck who expects services for $20 which is under the Ranch minimum spend of $50. At this point, it is revealed that the services are expensive because the girls are checked over by doctors to ensure they don't have sexually transmitted diseases. As Buck waits in the parlor for his friend to be serviced by one of the other girls, he tries to buy the services of Connie and the other girls for the $20 he has. Connie becomes increasingly hostile during the conversation, especially when Buck suggests his friend is being ripped off.

Following the altercation with Buck, Fran decides to open the liquor cabinet and allow the girls the opportunity to dance and unwind in the parlor. The girls are seen slow dancing with each other and enjoying themselves. The next night the girls and Fran are in the parlor for a meeting because Walter is unhappy that the girls got drunk while business hours were still going on elsewhere in the building causing frustration for another girl who was trying to service a client. A mention is made of a ghost in the Ranch called 'Harold' that the girls talk about to scare each other with frequently – a fine of $100 is to be put in place the next time a girl mentions 'Harold' in future.

Some time later (no mention of how long) J.J. decides to leave the Ranch. She is seen packing in her room; in a discussion with Mandy a short while later she admits that the business is starting to mess her up emotionally as three weeks of work at a time is making her feel like a machine. J.J. reveals she was very happy in her original profession as a cosmetologist but she just wasn't making enough money to support herself and her husband with.

In the morning, Ginger, Joey and Claudia are awakened for a line up in the Parlor following J.J.'s resignation from the brothel. While the two clients are being serviced, Fran goes to the living room to talk to J.J. who is stuck at the Ranch until she can be picked up by car. Fran advises J.J. to call her if things don't work out or if she ever needs a friend to talk to, J.J. admits she will keep in touch regardless as she will miss everyone. Fran hopes things will work for J.J. but advises her to be careful as she has seen girls leave before to go back to men who only want to pimp the girls out and she doesn't want to see this happen.

A few of the prostitutes wish J.J. goodbye; later, thanksgiving comes along and the remaining girls on the ranch celebrate with Walter and Fran. Walter gives a religious speech about all the nice things that have happened recently and that all the people who have come to the brothel has been thanks to God. The girls toast to a wonderful holiday and then following their meal, go out to line up in front of more clients. While the clients are being serviced, Connie dances provocatively in the parlor to music from the record player.

After thanksgiving Walter fires Mandy. Mandy is seen rushing to pack her bags following some kind of altercation with Walter. Walter enters Mandy's room while the cameras are rolling and warns the director to stop filming and that he wants the film reel from this scene so it doesn't end up being put in the documentary.

Moments later, Mandy is seen in the office after speaking to an airport on the phone as she tries to desperately get the next plane out of there; near tears she tells the director (Broomfield) that Walter threw all her luggage outside and told her to walk because she'd apparently 'quit'. So angry is Mandy that she tells the director Walter wouldn't even allow her a ride on his aeroplane (which other than by car, is the only transportation away from the Ranch). The firing of Mandy stems from her booking a client with Jacuzzi extra for $150 (far under the normal asking price) and Walter deducting $20 of the fee for the plane ride to the ranch before Mandy has had her 50/50 cut of her profits, meaning she is several dollars short on her earnings. As the director tries to query Mandy what started the argument, Walter comes into the hallway and warns the director again if they don't stop filming the situation at that moment, the film is stopping indefinitely and he will rip it all up and he will sue.

At this point, the documentary is ended absolutely with a short scene of a car driving away from the ranch (presumably with Mandy inside) and no follow up information is offered as to what happened to J.J. or Mandy or any of the other girls.

== Aftermath ==
The Ranch was sold in 1982 for $1,000,000 to Kenneth Green, a San Francisco business man who changed several policies and introduced dental and health insurance to the young women in service. Chicken Ranch's value is now estimated to be over $8,000,000. References to this famous brothel have been made in movies and television shows (the name is always changed for legal reasons).

Walter Plankinton's absence from a large portion of the documentary was due to his being in jail because of violation laws after the ranch was discovered to be within the limits of Pahrump where prostitution was still illegal. After several appeals he served 60 days in jail. Later, he was arrested in connection with the murder of three girls from another brothel. In 1984, while still in prison, Plankinton had a fatal heart attack and died a few days prior to the trial.

Mandy was murdered a few years following her dismissal from the ranch, and the murder is still unsolved. Diane went on to be a successful computer analyst while J.J. reportedly fell into the unfortunate fate that Fran had warned her of.

== See also ==
- Prostitution in Nevada
