= Mummies 3D: Secrets of the Pharaohs =

2007 short documentary film

Mummies 3D: Secrets of the Pharaohs is a 2007 IMAX film documenting Egypt's mummies as part historical recreation, and part archaeological expedition. Co-produced by the Franklin Institute, it was the companion film to the museum's Tutankhamun exhibition. The movie features Zahi Hawass and was narrated by Christopher Lee with a runtime of 39 minutes.
