= Grand Canyon: The Hidden Secrets =

- A screenshot of the title sequence
- Directed by: Kieth Merrill
- Written by: Kieth Merrill
- Produced by: Kieth Merrill
- Narrated by: (uncredited)
- Cinematography: Reed Smoot
- Edited by: Stephen L. Johnson
- Music by: Bill Conti
- Production company: Destination Cinema
- Distributed by: IMAX; Slingshot Entertainment
- Release date: June 16, 1984
- Running time: 34 minutes
- Country: United States
- Language: English
- Box office: $52.8 million (US)

Grand Canyon: The Hidden Secrets is a 34-minute short IMAX documentary film that was theatrically released on June 16, 1984. The film was created, directed, and written by American filmmaker Kieth Merrill and was produced by Destination Cinema. The music is composed by Bill Conti.

The IMAX film was followed by The Making of Grand Canyon: The Hidden Secrets, a 24-minute making-of documentary short released on January 11, 1999, but produced by Destination Cinema in 1993.

== Synopsis ==
The film covers the human history of the Grand Canyon area, being from a home to indigenous tribes to a major tourist destination. It portrays reenactments of the "Anasazi" people, European explorers, and the first expedition led by Major John Wesley Powell.

Much of the film was shot from a helicopter flying throughout the Canyon. The ending features a flight sequence following a lone, orange ultralight aircraft.

== Production ==
In addition to the Grand Canyon, parts of the film were shot in Kanab, Utah.

== Venue near the Grand Canyon ==
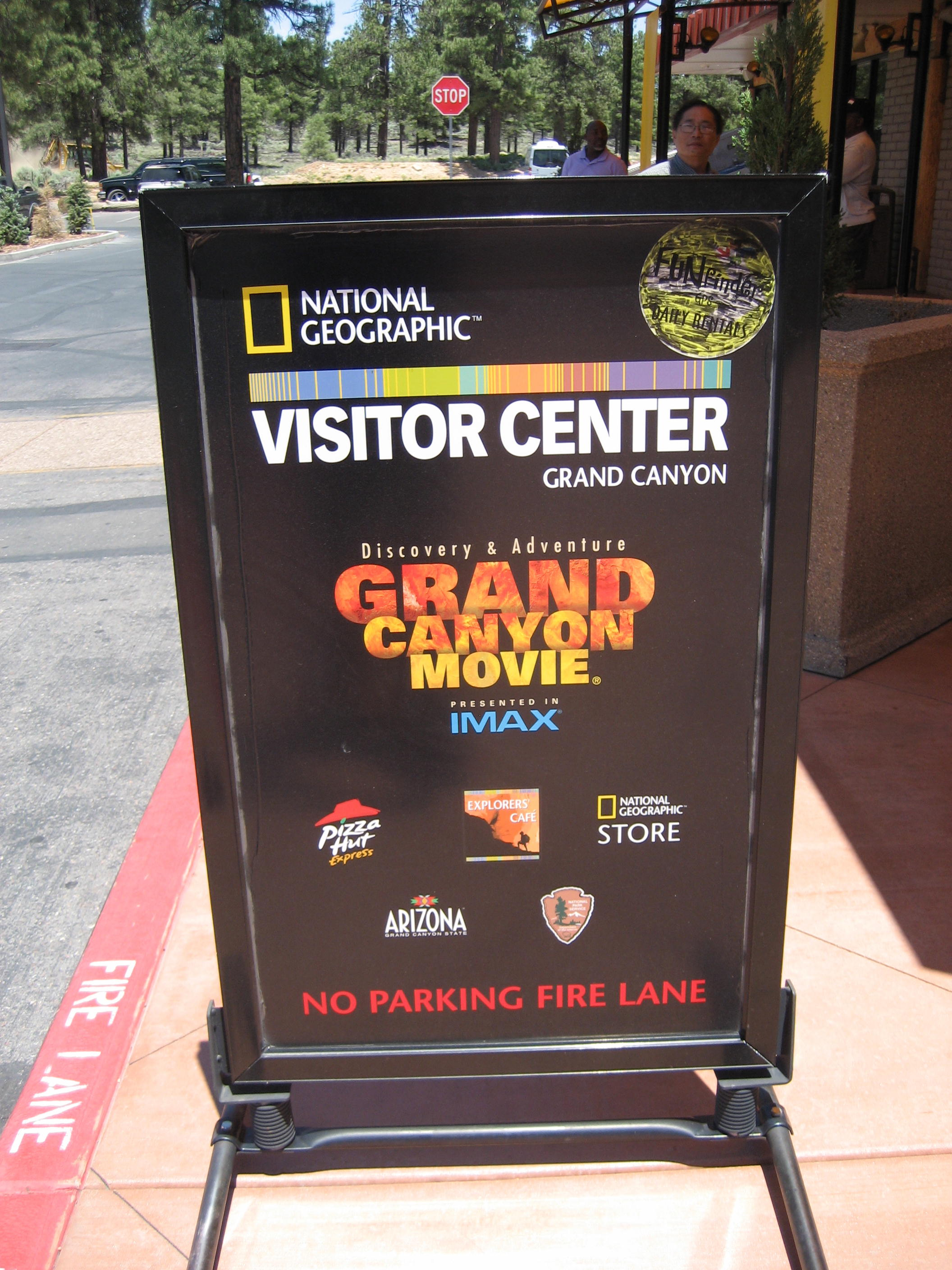
A poster at the Grand Canyon visitor center

As of 2016, the film has been playing at the IMAX theater adjacent to the National Geographic visitor center in Tusayan, Arizona, which is located near the South Rim of the Grand Canyon, in Grand Canyon National Park. There, the film is promotionally titled the Grand Canyon Movie.

== See also ==
- List of highest-grossing documentary films
- History of the Grand Canyon area
- Grand Canyon
- Grand Canyon National Park
- Grand Canyon Village
- Grand Canyon Village Historic District
