= Beavers (film) =

1988 film by Stephen Low

- Promotional poster
- Directed by: Stephen Low
- Produced by: Stephen Low
- Narrated by: Earl Pennington
- Cinematography: Andrew Kitzanuk
- Edited by: Janice Brown
- Music by: Eldon Rathburn
- Distributed by: The Stephen Low Company (IMAX), Image Entertainment (DVD)
- Release date: 1988
- Running time: 31 minutes
- Country: United States
- Language: English
- Budget: $2,000,000
- Box office: $26.4 million (US/Canada)

Beavers is a 1988 IMAX documentary directed by Stephen Low, focused on the lives of a group of beavers in Port Perry, Ontario and Kananaskis Country, Alberta. Wildlife expert William Carrick had hand-raised the beavers prior to filming, but they were not trained to perform; Low later described their performance as "very natural" and uninhibited by the presence of cameras and crew.

Beavers was Low's second IMAX film, following his short documentary Skyward, which had debuted at Expo 85 in Tsukuba, Japan. Dentsu, a Japanese advertising company, liked Skyward's depiction of Canada geese and contracted with Low for Beavers. Filmed in 15/70 IMAX format, the movie was eventually screened in 21 countries in 17 different languages.

A 34-minute "Director's Cut" was released in 2019, and again shown in IMAX theaters, with 12.1 surround sound and new aerial sequences.

Critics' reviews were generally positive, with Michael Walsh awarding it three stars, but noting Low's tendency to anthropomorphize his subjects in a Disney-like fashion. Jeff Strickler of the Star Tribune felt the knowledge that the beavers "are, in effect, actors" takes the edge off the amazement of the photography, but nonetheless gave the film eight out of ten stars and praised the cinematography. By 1995, the film had grossed $26.4 million in the United States and Canada.
