= The Princess and the Pea (2001 film) =

2001 short film by Curtis Linton

The Princess and the Pea is a short IMAX- lensed and filmed in IMAX. The film is an adaptation of the fairy tale "The Princess and the Pea" by Hans Christian Andersen. Written and directed by Curtis Linton, with Cinematographer Jimmy Matlosz lensing and Operating camera, the film was set in the Old West and was shot on location in Goblin Valley State Park, Utah, and Yucaipa, California. It was released on May 19, 2001 by Linton Films and was six minutes long.

The film was nominated twice for Motion Picture Sound Editors USA Golden Reel Award, in 2002 and 2003, for Best Sound Editing.

Among the cast members: Bruce Bohne (Papa Joe), Rusty Schwimmer (Mama Pat), Kirsten Moore (Princess Vee) and Hamilton von Watts (Billy Boy).
