= Deep Sea 3D =

- Theatrical release poster
- Directed by: Howard Hall
- Narrated by: Johnny Depp; Kate Winslet
- Cinematography: Howard Hall
- Music by: Danny Elfman; Deborah Lurie
- Production company: IMAX Entertainment
- Distributed by: Warner Bros. Pictures
- Release dates: March 3, 2006 (United States); April 6, 2006 (United Kingdom); January 27, 2007 (At-Bristol (United Kingdom))
- Running time: 40 minutes
- Country: Canada
- Language: English
- Budget: $1 million
- Box office: $96.9 million

Deep Sea 3D is a 2006 Canadian 3D IMAX documentary film about sea life. The documentary is directed by Howard Hall who has also directed other undersea films such as Into the Deep and Island of the Sharks. The film is narrated by Johnny Depp and Kate Winslet. It also features music by Danny Elfman. The film is 40 minutes long.

The film shows various sea animals, such as jellyfish, octopuses, and turtles as well as coral reef life.
