= The Endurance: Shackleton's Legendary Antarctic Expedition =

- Directed by: George Butler
- Written by: Caroline Alexander, Joseph Dorman
- Produced by: George Butler
- Narrated by: Liam Neeson
- Music by: Michael Small
- Production companies: WGBH Boston; White Mountain Films; Discovery Channel Pictures
- Distributed by: Cowboy Booking International
- Release date: 2 September 2000
- Running time: 97 minutes
- Country: United Kingdom
- Language: English
- Box office: $2.4 million

The Endurance is a 2000 documentary film directed by George Butler about Ernest Shackleton's legendary Antarctic expedition in 1914. It is based on the book of the same name. Endurance was the name of the ship of Shackleton's expedition. Butler followed it up the next year with another documentary about Shackleton's expedition titled Shackleton's Antarctic Adventure.

== Summary ==
After failing to be the first to reach the South Pole by only 97 miles in 1909, Shackleton set out to be the first to cross the Antarctic continent via the pole. The expedition met disastrous results when its ship became trapped and ultimately crushed in the ice pack. Shackleton and his 28-man crew endured the long polar winter before ultimately finding rescue following an 800-mile open boat voyage on the Weddell Sea. Against all odds, the entire crew of Endurance survived. Frank Hurley's original film footage was used by Butler, along with interviews of surviving relatives to present the story of Shackleton's expedition.

== Reception ==
The film was well received by critics, and was nominated for and won several awards.

== See also ==
- Survival film – Film genre depicting survival efforts
