= Shackleton's Antarctic Adventure =

2001 film by George Butler

- DVD release poster
- Directed by: George Butler
- Written by: Mose Richards; Crystal Spijer
- Produced by: George Butler; Scott Swofford
- Starring: Michael Gambon; Conrad Anker; Iain Fraser
- Narrated by: Kevin Spacey
- Cinematography: Reed Smoot
- Music by: Sam Cardon
- Production companies: WGBH Boston; White Mountain Films
- Distributed by: WGBH Giant-Screen Films
- Release date: 10 February 2001
- Running time: 40 minutes
- Country: United States
- Language: English
- Box office: $15,553,324

Shackleton's Antarctic Adventure is an IMAX film about the Imperial Trans-Antarctic Expedition led by Ernest Shackleton between 1914 and 1917. Directed by George Butler, the film was released in February 2001 and was narrated by Kevin Spacey. It documents Shackleton's journey aboard the Endurance and was the follow-up to Butler's previous film, The Endurance: Shackleton's Legendary Antarctic Expedition.

== Summary ==
In 1914, Shackleton set out to walk across the whole of Antarctica. While the South Pole had already been discovered, people had yet to make the cross-continent trek on foot. Before making landfall, however, his ship became trapped in the ice floe of the Weddell Sea where he and his crew stayed for over 400 days.

== Cast ==
- Kevin Spacey – Narrator (voice)
- Michael Gambon – Sir Ernest Shackleton (voice)
- Conrad Anker – Himself
- Reinhold Messner – Himself
- Stephen Venables – Himself

== Production ==
The film was shot on location in Antarctica and also utilizes footage taken by the original expedition photographer, Frank Hurley.

== Critical reception ==
- The film received "Two Thumbs Up" from Ebert and Roeper.
- Rotten Tomatoes suggests it is "a gorgeously made film tracking the explorer's legendary 1914 expedition to the icey, uninhabited continent."
- Joe Leydon, in Variety, wrote, "Despite its brevity, 'Adventure' vividly conveys the character and courage of Shackleton, one of the last great champions of the Heroic Age of Adventure. Butler glosses over a few unpleasant details in this telling of the story—for the sake of school-aged sensibilities, he was requested to refrain from showing how crewmen were forced to kill sled dogs for food—but the story remains gripping nonetheless."

== See also ==
- South: Sir Ernest Shackleton's Glorious Epic of the Antarctic, a 1919 documentary film
