= Roving Mars =

- Theatrical release poster
- Directed by: George Butler
- Written by: Robert Andrus; George Butler
- Produced by: George Butler; Frank Marshall
- Narrated by: Paul Newman (introduction only)
- Cinematography: T.C. Christensen
- Edited by: Nancy Baker
- Music by: Philip Glass; Sigur Rós
- Production companies: Walt Disney Pictures; White Mountain Films; The Kennedy/Marshall Company
- Distributed by: Buena Vista Pictures Distribution
- Release date: January 27, 2006
- Running time: 40 minutes
- Country: United States
- Language: English
- Budget: $1 million
- Box office: $11 million

Roving Mars is a 2006 American IMAX documentary film about the development, launch, and operation of the Mars Exploration Rovers, Spirit and Opportunity. The film uses few actual photographs from Mars, opting to use computer generated animation based on the photographs and data from the rovers and other Mars probes. The film has been released on Blu-ray disc by distributor Disney.

Roving Mars has made over US$10 million as of January 25, 2009.

Roving Mars is also the title of a non-fiction book by MER principal investigator Steve Squyres about the rover mission.

== Music ==
The musical score for Roving Mars was composed by Philip Glass. A soundtrack album was released by Lakeshore Records on June 27, 2006. The album also features the song "Glósóli" by Sigur Rós.

== Reception ==
Roving Mars received positive reviews from critics. Rotten Tomatoes reports a 70% rating based on 37 reviews, with an average rating of 6.8/10. Its consensus states that "Roving Mars is a decent thrill ride even when it starts feeling like a commercial plug for NASA's failing space program."

Entertainment Weekly gave the film a B−, stating that "Only a series of pics featuring a set of strange little nodes that look like blueberries planted in a pile of red rocks carry any kind of translatable otherworldly kick." The New York Post called it a "splendidly photographed 2D IMAX film." The Boston Globe said "Despite audiences knowing the happy ending from the get-go, [director] [George] Butler manages to inject considerable drama."

Conversely, the Los Angeles Times claimed, "Not having a way to capture images of the machines at work means that too much of Butler's film... is disappointingly made up of computer simulations.", while the San Francisco Chronicle claimed that "There aren't enough pyrotechnics in the paltry 40-minute run time to justify the ticket price."
