= Chris Palmer (film producer) =

Hong Kong–born English film producer

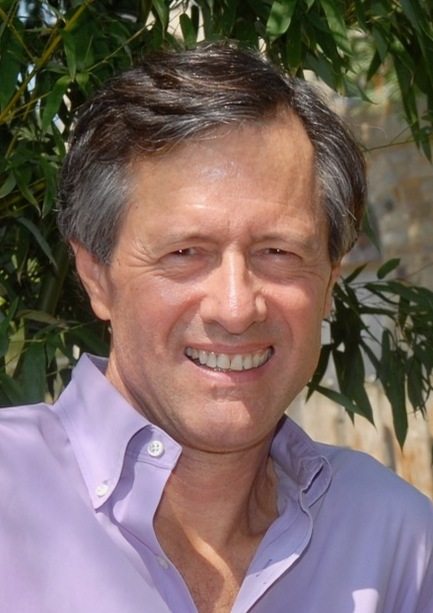
- Born: 25 August 1947 (age 79); Hong Kong
- Occupations: Film producer, Professor, Author
- Years active: 1983–present

Chris Palmer (born on 25 August 1947) is a Hong Kong-born English environmental and wildlife film producer and director of the Center for Environmental Filmmaking at American University. He was executive producer for the Oscar nominated film Dolphins. He is author of Shooting in the Wild: An Insider's Account of Making Movies in the Animal Kingdom (ISBN 1578051487), Confessions of a Wildlife Filmmaker: The Challenges of Staying Honest in an Industry Where Ratings Are King (ISBN 193895405X), and Now What Grad: Your Path to Success After College (ISBN 1475823665).

== Early life ==
Born in Hong Kong, Palmer grew up in England, served as an officer in the Royal Navy for seven years, and immigrated to the United States in 1972. He holds a B.S. with First Class Honors in Mechanical Engineering and an M.S. in Ocean Engineering and Naval Architecture from University College London and a Master of Public Administration from Harvard University where he was a Kennedy Scholar and received a Harkness Fellowship.

== Career ==
After his immigration to the United States in 1972, he worked as chief energy advisor to Senator Charles H. Percy. He then served as a political appointee in the Environmental Protection Agency under President Jimmy Carter. In 1983, he founded National Audubon Society Productions, where he served as president and CEO for 11 years. In 1994, he founded the nonprofit National Wildlife Productions (part of the National Wildlife Federation, the largest conservation organization in the United States) which he managed as president and CEO for 10 years, directing NWF's launch into broadcast, cable, IMAX, and other media markets. He is a professor in the American University School of Communication. He publishes articles regularly (including a bimonthly column for Realscreen Magazine) and currently serves on the boards of fourteen non-profits.

=== Film and television production ===
Since the early 1980s, Palmer has been actively involved in film and television production, specializing in environmental and wildlife filmmaking. His films have been broadcast on the Disney Channel, TBS, PBS, Animal Planet, and other channels. Palmer has executive produced several IMAX films with MacGillivray Freeman Films, including Coral Reef Adventure and Dolphins. Dolphins was nominated for the 2000 Academy Award for Best Short Subject Documentary. His other IMAX film include Bears, Wolves, and Whales, "To The Arctic 3D", and "Journey to the South Pacific 3D". He Also Worked on RSPCA's My Little Puppy PSA. In 2004, Palmer was named president of the MacGillivray Freeman Films Educational Foundation, which produces and funds IMAX films and companion educational outreach materials and programs.

=== Teaching ===
In August 2004, Palmer joined the full-time faculty of American University as Distinguished Film Producer in Residence. At American, he founded the Center for Environmental Filmmaking. He continues to serve as director of the Center for Environmental Filmmaking while also teaching classes in the School of Communication.

Palmer is a frequent speaker at conferences and film festivals and gives workshops on such subjects as effective networking and giving effective presentations. In 2010, he was a featured speaker at the Environmental Film Festival in Washington, DC as well as at the Jackson Hole Wildlife Film Festival in Jackson Hole, Wyoming. He has been interviewed on The Today Show and The Fox News Channel and in May, 2010, appeared on the Diane Rehm Show as a guest panelist. His book, Shooting in the Wild: An Insider's Account of Making Movies in the Animal Kingdom was published in 2010 by Sierra Club Books and has received critical acclaim for being "a sharp and searching assessment of the contemporary wildlife media universe from someone who loves the field and wants to see it live up to its promise." On 1 March 2012. In the book Palmer said, "You have to send your kids to college, you want to retire with some money. You cannot go back with dull footage. When you're under that pressure, and the weather is closing in, ethics is the last thing in your mind." His book was recently made into a public television documentary entitled "Shooting in the Wild", and was narrated by Alexandra Cousteau. Palmer was a guest panelist on the Kojo Nnamdi Show.

=== Awards ===
In 1994, Palmer received the Frank G. Wells Award for ongoing commitment to environmental protection from the Environmental Media Association. In 2009, he was honored with the Lifetime Achievement Award for Media at the International Wildlife Film Festival. Palmer was recognized in 2010 as the "Environmental Film Educator of the Decade" at the Green Globe Film Awards. Palmer received the International Wildlife Film Festival's first-ever "IWFF Wildlife Hero of the Year Award" on 13 May 2011 in Missoula, Montana at the 34th annual award ceremony. In 2012, he was named the recipient of the Ronald B. Tobias Award for Achievement in Science and Natural History Filmmaking Education. In 2015, Palmer received a Lifetime Achievement Award at the International Wildlife Film Festival.

== Personal life ==
Palmer lives in Bethesda, Maryland. He is married to Gail Shearer and is father to three grown daughters: Kimberly, Christina, and Jennifer. In his free time, he performs stand-up comedy in DC area comedy clubs.

== Filmography ==
=== Executive producer ===
Year	Film	Notes
1986	Condor	TV documentary
1986	The Mysterious Black-Footed Ferret	TV documentary
1987	On the Edge of Extinction: Panthers and Cheetahs	TV documentary
1987	Common Ground: Farming and Wildlife	TV documentary
1987	Ducks Under Siege	TV documentary
1987	Woodstork: Barometer of the Everglades	TV documentary
1987	Whales!	TV documentary
1988	Grizzly & Man: Uneasy Truce	TV documentary
1988	Messages from the Birds	TV documentary
1988	Sea Turtles: Ancient Nomads	TV documentary
1988	World of Audubon: Sharks!	TV documentary
1989	Greed and Wildlife: Poaching in America	Video documentary
1989	Crane River	TV documentary
1989	Ancient Forests: Rage Over Trees	TV documentary
1989	Wolves	TV documentary
1990	If Dolphins Could Talk	TV documentary
1990	Arctic Refuge: A Vanishing Wilderness?	TV documentary
1990	Ivory Hunters	TV movie
1990	Danger at the Beach	TV documentary
1990	Wildfire	TV documentary
1991	Hope for the Tropics	TV documentary
1991	The New Range Wars	TV documentary
1991	Great Lakes, Bitter Legacy	TV documentary
1991	Caribbean Cool	TV documentary
1991	Mysterious Elephants of the Congo	TV documentary
1992	This Island Earth	TV documentary
1992	Battle for the Great Plains	TV documentary
1992	The Environmental Tourist	TV documentary
1992	Greenhouse Gamble	TV documentary
1992	Sex, Lies and Holes in the Skies	TV documentary
1993	Hawaii: Paradise in Peril	
1993	Galapagos: My Fragile World	TV documentary
1993	Backlash in the Wild	TV documentary
1993	Cathedrals in the Sea	TV documentary
1994	Desperately Seeking Sanctuary	TV documentary
1994	Hunt for the Giant Bluefin	TV documentary
1994	The World of Audubon 10th Anniversary Special	TV movie
1996	An African Love Story	TV documentary
1996	Dolphins in Danger	TV documentary
1996	Survival of the Yellowstone Wolves	TV documentary
1996	The Last Great American Gold Heist	TV documentary
1996	Wild Life Adventures	TV series - 8 episodes (1996–2000)
1997	Tiger!	Documentary
1997	Wildlife Encounters: Alaska	TV documentary
1997	BirdWatch	TV series documentary
1998	Whales: An Unforgettable Journey	Documentary short Producer - as Christopher Palmer
1998	Nature	Episode: "American Buffalo: Spirit of a Nation"
1998	Wildlife Wars	TV documentary
1998	Wildlife Emergency	TV series documentary
1999	Return of the Eagle	TV movie
1999	Wolves	IMAX documentary short
1999	Wild City	TV documentary
2000	Tracks: Tracking with the San People of the Kalahari	TV documentary
2000	Dolphins	IMAX documentary short
2000	Troubled Waters	TV documentary
2002	India: Kingdom of the Tiger	IMAX documentary short
2003	Coral Reef Adventure	IMAX documentary short - as Christopher Palmer
2004	Bears	IMAX documentary short
2008	Grand Canyon Adventure: River at Risk	Documentary short - Senior coordinating producer
2009	Ocean for Life: Ocean Melody	IMAX documentary short
2011	Working with Fire	Documentary short
2012	True Wolf	Theatrical documentary
2012	To the Arctic 3D	IMAX documentary short
2012	Safe Haven: The Delmarva Fox Squirrel and Blackwater National Wildlife Refuge	Documentary short
2013	Journey to the South Pacific	IMAX documentary short
2013	Shooting in the Wild	TV documentary - author
2015	Fifty Years of Farming	TV documentary
2016	The Culture of Collards	TV documentary
2016	When Mickey Came to Town	TV documentary

=== Director ===
Year	Television	Notes
2006	The Simpsons	Episode: "Homer Simpson, This Is Your Wife" (uncredited); The Live action opening sequence
