= Alec Lorimore =

American film producer and screenwriter (born 1948)

- Born: 1948 (age 77–78)
- Education: University of Southern California (BA)
- Occupations: Film producer, screenwriter
- Spouse: Alison Logan (died 2003)

Alec Lorimore (born 1948) is a twice Academy Award-nominated film producer and screenwriter who has concentrated his focus in creating giant screen, IMAX documentary films. He is credited as one of the three producers of 1998 IMAX film Everest, which had generated over $140 million in worldwide box office, making it the highest-grossing IMAX documentary film of the time.

== Early life and education ==
He received a Bachelor of Arts in cinema from the USC School of Cinematic Arts of the University of Southern California in 1971.

He was previously married to actress Alison Logan, who died in April 2003.

== Career ==
From 1993 to 2005, he was Vice President of Production & Development at MacGillivray Freeman Films, a production and distribution entity in the giant screen, 70 mm film industry.

Previous to his involvement in the IMAX industry he worked for over ten years as a screenwriter, and wrote a number of feature film scripts which were either purchased or commissioned by the major studios, including Warner Brothers, Columbia Pictures, Metro-Goldwyn-Mayer, and Paramount Pictures, and worked with such producers as Jerry Bruckheimer, Jonathan Taplin, Ray Stark, and Steve Tisch.

He has served on the Informal Science Review Panel of the National Science Foundation (NSF), which determines which media projects receive NSF grants, as well as on the board of directors of the Environmental Media Association (EMA), creators of the Green Seal program for environmentally sustainable motion picture and television production practices.

He has been a member of the Academy of Motion Picture Arts and Sciences since 1995, and served for over 15 years on the Executive Committee of the Academy's Documentary Branch.

== Awards and recognition ==
He was first nominated (with Greg MacGillivay) for an Academy Award for Best Documentary (Short Subject) in 1995 for The Living Sea, and the two men were subsequently nominated for Dolphins in the same Academy category in 2000. Other films include The Magic of Flight (Producer) and At Sea (Writer, Producer), for which he received the Alfred Thayer Mahan Award for Literary Achievement from the Navy League of the United States.

== Filmography ==
- Behold Hawaii (1982): writer
- Dance of Life (1982): writer
- Homeland (1990): writer, producer
- At Sea (1992): writer, producer
- The Magic of Flight (1996): producer
- Everest (1998): producer
- Adventures in Wild California (2000): producer
- Dolphins (2000): producer
- Journey into Amazing Caves (2001): producer
- Coral Reef Adventure (2003): producer
- Top Speed (2003): producer
- Greece: Secrets of the Past (2006): producer
