= To Fly! =

1976 IMAX film by MacGillivray Freeman Films

- 2013 theatrical release poster
- Directed by: Greg MacGillivray; Jim Freeman
- Written by: Francis Thompson; Greg MacGillivray; Jim Freeman; Robert M. Young; Arthur Zegart; Thomas McGrath
- Produced by: Greg MacGillivray; Jim Freeman
- Starring: Peter Walker
- Cinematography: Greg MacGillivray; Jim Freeman
- Edited by: Greg MacGillivray; Jim Freeman
- Music by: Bernardo Segall
- Production companies: MacGillivray Freeman Films; Francis Thompson, Inc.
- Distributed by: Lawrence Associates; Conoco
- Release date: July 1, 1976
- Running time: 27 minutes (Note: Several sources misstated the running time by a few minutes)
- Country: United States
- Language: English
- Budget: US$590,000
- Box office: $135 million

To Fly! is a 1976 American short docudrama film directed by Greg MacGillivray and Jim Freeman of MacGillivray Freeman Films, who wrote the story with Francis Thompson, Robert M. Young, and Arthur Zegart. It premiered at the giant-screen IMAX theater of the National Air and Space Museum, which opened to celebrate the United States Bicentennial. The film chronicles the history of aviation in the US, with a narration written by Thomas McGrath. Thematically, it explores the search for national identity through the country's westward expansion as well as humanity's relationship with aviation.

The idea of the film was proposed in 1970 and revisited two years later following the museum's interest in an IMAX theater for the planned building. MacGillivray and Freeman expanded a treatment written by the Smithsonian Institution and Thompson, adding various scenes in the storyboard intended to jolt IMAX audiences. Due to the large dimensions of the screens, the filmmakers aimed for immersion and clarity via novel cinematographic techniques. This was further enhanced by the surround sound design. The ending space sequence, featuring the first IMAX rocket launch scene, was made with various experimental special effects. The film was edited by MacGillivray and Freeman, and features a score composed by Bernardo Segall. It was finished on schedule in two years, with a low US$590,000 fund from Conoco.

To Fly! was released on July 1, 1976, distributed by Lawrence Associates and Conoco. It was initially scheduled to screen only for the Bicentennial, but due to public demand was kept indefinitely. In response to these demands, a 20th-anniversary special edition was released in 1996. The film led to the worldwide building of IMAX theaters and helped popularizing the nascent format, with various intense reactions evoked by audiences. It was inducted into the National Film Registry and IMAX Hall of Fame, and set MacGillivray as a major IMAX filmmaker. With increasing popularity, To Fly! remained among the highest-grossing giant-screen documentaries. Critics praised the film in its audiovisual aspect but were polarized by its narrative, and it received several accolades.

== Summary ==
To Fly! begins in Vermont on July 4, 1831. After reciting a zestful quatrain declaring himself a pioneer, a fictional hot air balloonist named Ezekiel ascends on a voyage around New England. Spectators below look at the balloon in awe and surprise. Ezekiel sees a canoeist heading to whitewater at Horseshoe Falls and warns him to shore to avoid the rapid.

The film then chronicles the history of aviation, beginning with hot air balloons. Its advent is described by the narrator as "like the opening of a new eye", allowing humans to reach untouched places and extend their limits, furthering their perspectives about the world. Despite this, the majority of Americans still used horses; for speedier travel, trains were invented, then cars and powered aircraft. The Roaring Twenties saw the rise of barnstorming, expanding access to aviation among Americans. As part of diversifying aviation, military jets were created, thereupon forming aerobatic teams like the Blue Angels. The use of jetliners made travel faster, and the American territory expanded beyond the mainland. Then, ultralight aviation was invented.

After describing the human imagination as limitless due to a philosophical awakening from the aerial view of the world, To Fly! lastly depicts the Saturn IB rocket launch for the Apollo–Soyuz mission at the Kennedy Space Center on July 15, 1975. Dubbing spaceflight a globally historical feat, the film suggests it can be used in finding extraterrestrial intelligence. The film ends with the narration:

We have come a long way from the time when people gazed enviously upon the birds in-flight. Today, we look upon our planet from afar, and feel a new tenderness for the tiny and fragile Earth. For we know now, that even as we walk upon the ground, we are ever in-flight through the universe. And so, we begin to realize that human destiny has ever been, and always must be, to fly!

== Production ==
=== Background ===
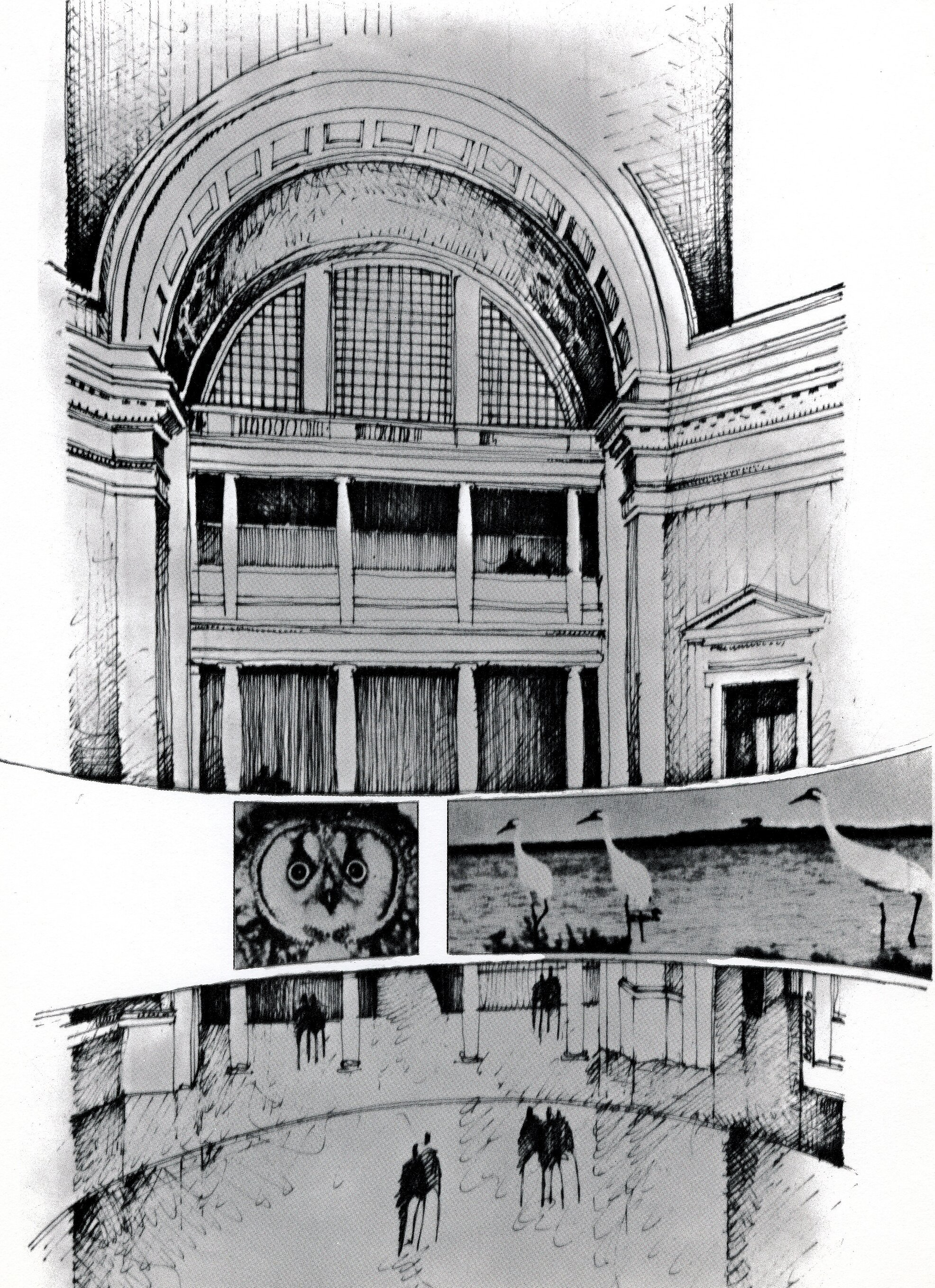
Illustration of a proposed IMAX-decorated rotunda at the National Museum of Natural History; this was canceled for an IMAX theater at the National Air and Space Museum.

The Smithsonian Institution made efforts starting in 1911 to modernize its museums with multimedia content, though this only accelerated since the 1960s. The idea of a giant-screen theater at the National Air and Space Museum (NASM) was mooted in 1970 in a 153-page report by the National Museum of Natural History's (NMNH) curator team, which argued the museum needed a "contemporary medium of communications" that will resonate intellectually and psychologically. It suggested an experiential film that would showcase the American landscape and the country's introduction to technology, ending with predictions of the country's future. Among these giant-screen film formats was IMAX, characterized by its tall screen which fills the audiences' peripheral vision, triggering immersive telepresence which creates the illusion of being present within the film's setting. The NMNH proposed a panoramic, curved IMAX screen that envelops its rotunda, but this was discarded.

In 1972, the deputy director of the Smithsonian, Melvin B. Zisfein, wrote a memo praising IMAX over other giant-screen formats like Cinerama and Circle-Vision 360°, and suggested making an IMAX film for the NASM. Several film treatments were written, the first titled "The Beautiful Mysteries of Flight", though all were rejected. (Note: Other treatments include "Flying For Fun" (rejected as only catering to enthusiasts), "The Evolution of Flight" (rejected for excessive animation), "To the Stars and Beyond" (rejected for its monotony), and "Speed".) A year later, IMAX's co-founder Graeme Ferguson expressed interest in an IMAX film for the US Bicentennial, also considering the possibility of it being feature-length. In 1974, after hearing about plans for a new building of the NASM at the National Mall in Washington, D.C. as part of the Bicentennial, he proposed this to the museum director Michael Collins. While Ferguson believed this would enhance the museum, Collins had not seen an IMAX film and initially rejected the proposal. However, at Expo '74, an IMAX representative convinced him to go to the IMAX theater and see Ferguson's film Man Belongs to the Earth; he became convinced that an IMAX theater would provide a sense of realism to visitors and accepted the idea.

=== Pre-production ===
On July 1, 1974, giant-screen filmmaker Francis Thompson joined in proposing a film about the history of flight for the Bicentennial at the NASM theater. With a US$590,000 fund from the Continental Oil Company (Conoco), with an additional $160,000 for film rights, they set the production deadline to 1976. After writing a third treatment with Thompson, the Smithsonian commissioned filmmaker duo Greg MacGillivray and James "Jim" Freeman, who had previously made surf and giant-screen films with experimental editing; they had also shot aerials for Jonathan Livingston Seagull (1973) and The Towering Inferno (1974). Collins told them that he did not want the film to be too history-oriented and instead be more fun. With Collins giving them full creative freedom, pre-production meetings took place in New York City for several months.

The opening scene of Man Belongs to the Earth (1974), which convinced Collins to build an IMAX theater, and the highlight of MacGillivray and Freeman's research for To Fly!

Collins and Zisfein gave around 30 suggestions, about 20 of which were incorporated into the film. MacGillivray and Freeman thought the treatment was imperfect and expanded it into a narrative docudrama with several moments of comedy. They analyzed the existing IMAX films for inspiration, including Man Belongs to the Earth, whose opening aerial shot of the Grand Canyon enthused them. Per Collins, they included scenes with comic relief in To Fly! in order to not make the film feel like a dry historical drama. Thompson agreed, saying there were enough fact-based Bicentennial films being made and that people needed more entertainment. MacGillivray said IMAX is perfect for the film because it "allows me [...] to impact the audience in a greater way". He and Freeman storyboarded it with John Divers at their Laguna Beach, California, office, creating "IMAX moments" to thrill audiences and to rely on visuals more than narration. Seven months were spent on research, with aviators Walter J. Boyne and Donald S. Lopez Sr. as technical advisors.

Actor and real-life balloonist Peter Walker was chosen to portray Ezekiel due to his comic charm. The character was based upon a balloonist who in 1790 apparently made flights over New England while reciting self-written poems, purportedly to impress young women. Walker listed To Fly! among his favorite films to star in. Through filmmaker Randal Kleiser, whom he knew from his friend Basil Poledouris, MacGillivray partook in courses with actress Nina Foch to master in directing his cast. Extras were not mandated to speak because they comprise locals, some of whom the filmmakers felt were amateur. Freeman's girlfriend Cindy Huston, MacGillivray's girlfriend Barbara Smith, and production manager-costumer Jeff Blyth made cameo appearances as different characters. Huston was also focus puller, and Smith was production assistant, craft service specialist, and unit still photographer. Other writers were Thompson, Robert M. Young, and Arthur Zegart; Thomas McGrath wrote the narration. Additionally, Byron McKinney was executive producer. Documentarian and historian Jon Wilkman was briefly involved, alongside NASA, the Office of Naval Research, and the California Institute of Technology.

=== Filming ===
Principal photography occurred for five months in 1975. Filming paused two and a half months later during June for MacGillivray and Freeman to film the action scenes of Sky Riders (1976), then resumed for two and a half months. They directed and cinematographed the film, frequently switching roles and working seven days a week with a 5 a.m. to 9 p.m. shooting schedule. They often filmed together in a multiple-camera setup, like in one of the barnstorming shots. According to MacGillivray, To Fly! was the most fun film that he and Freeman worked on throughout their 11 years of partnership.

At the time, IMAX cameras weighed 80 pounds (36 kilograms) and felt "crude" to the filmmakers, dismaying them as they wanted to experiment with the cinematography. Furthermore, they were worried about damaging the only camera available to them, and wanted to minimize the need for retakes. Ferguson and fellow IMAX co-founders, Bill Shaw and Robert Kerr, ideated creating three new cameras with better specifications, with one of them to be used for Thompson in his other Bicentennial film, American Years. Ferguson granted the proposal. When filming an aerial scene in American Years, the camera's parachute failed to deploy, destroying it. The pre-existing camera was also modified to be on par with the new ones.

To make the film bright, colorful, and naturalistic, the crew used the Eastman Color Negative 5254 tungsten 65 mm film stock, with the opening scene in 35 mm. The costly stock caused the short duration of 27 minutes. To give a dramatic look, they emphasized the characters with cross-backlighting or crosslighting. Because of IMAX's large screens and where the perceived center would be, many novel techniques were implemented. Extreme long shots were treated as wide-angle shots, while the latter were treated as normal shots, and close-ups were treated as medium close-ups. The latter has a wider headroom for visual comfort. Movement was condensed to ease the switching between an extreme long shot to medium close-up, and a wide-angle lens was used to further expand the film's view. Camera lenses were also carefully chosen, ranging from the fisheye 30 mm to the telephoto 600 mm. Pentax and Hasselblad lenses were used; the latter had their focal lengths changed, shutters removed, and mounts modified. It took three months to test them and the camera magazines. However, they had no zoom lenses which MacGillivray said would have eased filming.

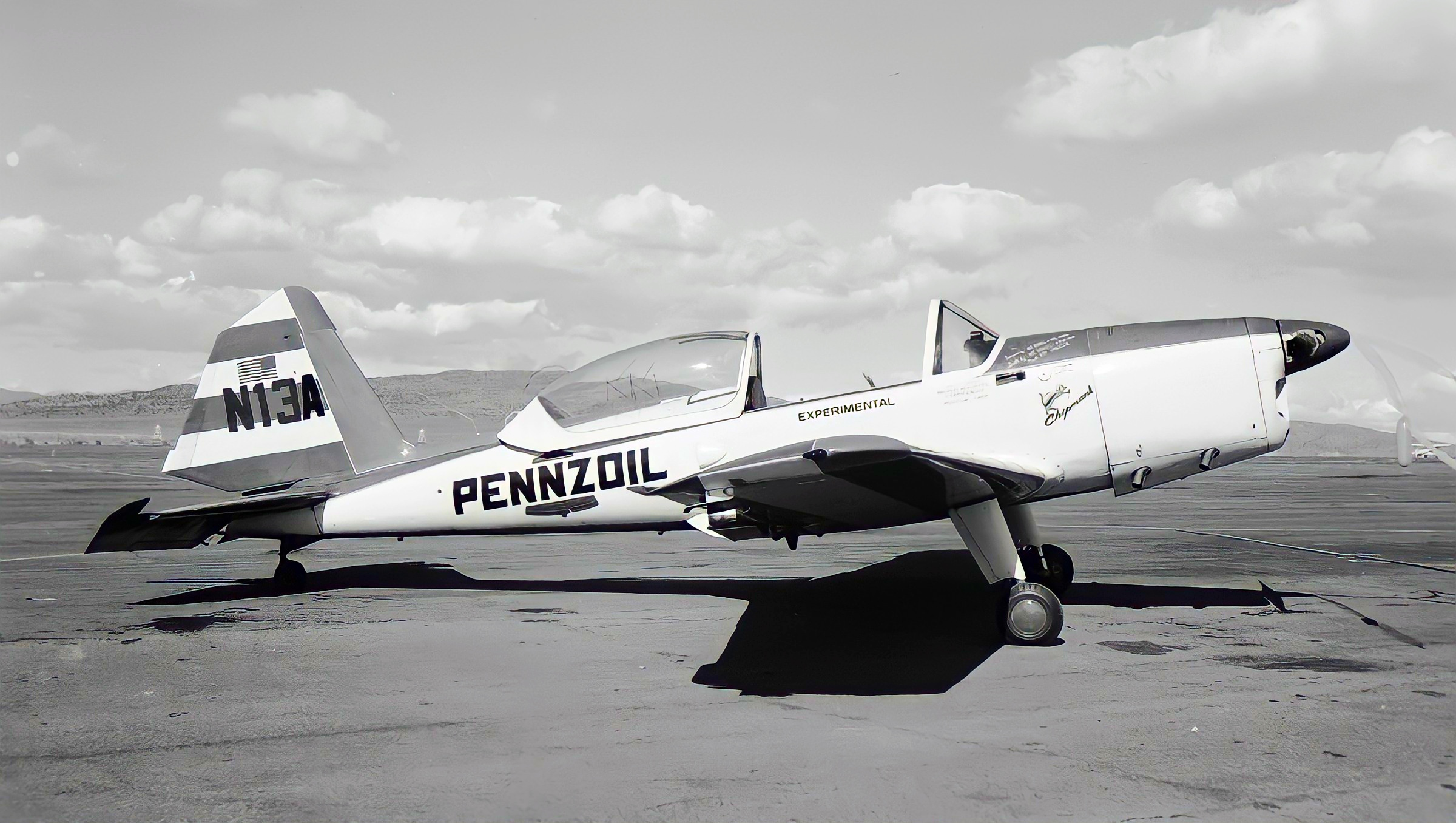
Art Scholl's "Super Chipmunk" (pictured 1968), used as a camera plane for the filming of To Fly!

Many shots in the film were time-consuming to make: a 35-second shot of the Blue Angels flying over the Colorado River and Yuma Desert took over four months to choreograph. Camera mounts were designed by the United States Navy for a McDonnell Douglas F-4 Phantom II piloted by Kevin O'Mara used to film the shot. Nelson Tyler spent two months developing two mounts for the camera helicopters to film front and side shots, providing smoothness as the smallest vibrations would be noticeable on IMAX. The helicopters were piloted by George Nolan, Chuck Phillips, and Adrian Brooks. Mounts were also made by Boeing for the Boeing 747; they used its first prototype. (Note: Attributed to multiple references:) Art Scholl's "Super Chipmunk" aircraft was used to film front shots. The Navy donated helium for the hot air balloon, thanks to the Blue Angels' presence in the film. The balloon, in shots where it actually flies, was piloted by Kurt Stehling, with whom MacGillivray has collaborated in Above San Francisco (1973).

Aerial work platforms were used to support the balloon basket and camera; two platforms supported the basket as it moved in opposing directions to heighten the illusion of flight. The balloon was decorated with 13 American flags, the number of states in the US in 1831, sewn by a vexillography shop. To create a shot in which a Sierra No. 3 train seemingly hits the camera, inspired by the allegedly jolting effects of L'Arrivée d'un train en gare de La Ciotat (1895), the crew placed a mirror in a diagonal position at the rail facing towards the camera, which imaged the mirror for a symmetrical view of the rail as the train approached and shattered it. The illusion of pilots flying was made by filming close-ups of the aircraft backdropped by the sky while the camera dawdles within a rigid camera dolly. Bob Wills flew a hang glider above the Nā Pali coastline.

Various kinds of transportation were used. In one scene, a stagecoach races with the train; previously there is a Conestoga wagon. Frank Tallman flew a Curtiss Model D for the mechanical flight scene. A Ford Model T was used in the scene talking about the invention of cars; the succeeding scene was filmed above Coastal California. The Blue Angels flew Douglas A-4 Skyhawks. Aerials of the 747 were filmed from a provided 737. Other filming locations include the Gateway Arch, Lake Powell, Monument Valley, Zion Canyon, Yosemite Falls, the Appalachian Mountains, and the Sierra Nevada. The barnstorming scene was filmed in California, and the opening sequence's forests in Parsons, West Virginia. Filming also occurred in Alaska and Craftsbury, Vermont. A barn raising scene from the opening was cut from the final release. Overall, 150,000 feet (46,000 metres) of film stock were used. (Note: Attributed to multiple references:)

==== Space sequence ====
Video of the Saturn V's interstage ring, also shown in the film

To Fly!'s space sequence depicts the launch of the Saturn IB, before showing a fictional spaceship voyaging around the Solar System. Five nebulae are then depicted before ending with a view of Earth.

The filmmakers were given permission to film the launch, marking the first time such was filmed in IMAX. They took this part more seriously because it could not be repeated. After filming 1,200 feet (370 metres) away from the launch pad, they left their camera outside for a day, forming condensation inside and exacerbated by seasonal thunderstorms. It was found wet and jammed, and the crew spent three hours cleaning it to recover the recording. Meanwhile, a shot of the Saturn V's interstage ring jettisonning back to Earth was filmed in 16 mm film from the actual rocket's second stage, during Apollo 4 in 1967.

With a low budget, they initially conceived the space sequence as merely a compilation of astronomical images but realized they needed some kind of movement for an IMAX film, and thus saved money on the live-action filming in order to achieve a better space sequence. They expected To Fly! to be compared with the film 2001: A Space Odyssey (1968), and tried to make the sequence as reminiscent of that film as possible. They learned that small objects like stars on an IMAX screen are much smaller on a traditional presentation, and typical small stars would be oversized in IMAX; after some difficulty, they were able to create perfect-sized stars on an 8-by-360-inch (20-by-914-centimetre) Kodalith negative sheet film. Because of the nature of IMAX, filming some scenes at six and twelve frames per second (fps) was preferred over stop motion. George Casey and Lester Novros of special effects company Graphic Films (Note: They had worked on another IMAX film, Voyage to the Outer Planets (1973).) provided planetary models and a studio, and also assisted the crew.

The spaceship seen was a transparent two-inch (5.1-centimetre) portion of a larger 36-inch (0.91-metre) model built by MacGillivray and Freeman, backlit on a glass frame. As special effects supervisor, Blyth designed it to have the same color palette as the 747, and inspired by concepts of advanced ion thrusters and magnetically confined fusions like deuterium and helium-3. It took 150 hours to create, with Collins as technical advisor. For a shot in which the spaceship passes Jupiter and Io, the crew filmed each object one by one; the film would be rewound back to layer in the next object. The camera was placed on a motorized dolly. Some shots, including the one of Saturn, were filmed at an animation stand. Others used a faux version of the slit-scan photography kit used for 2001: A Space Odyssey: the sheet film was projected onto a white board, which the fisheye-lensed camera was put close to. Models were attached to a peg bar, near where their glass frame was suspended on. To film extreme slow shots with distinct movement, a geared head and a zoom-motored gear were used, creating a slight pan. They filmed all these on 16 mm first to see if it could be done on IMAX.

Bellows and close-up lenses by Hasselblad were used for the penultimate nebulae shots; the camera was facing a tray filled with water and a mixture of black ink and white enamel paint lit by color gels. The materials' temperature, thickness, size, and type had to be precise to achieve the reaction. Unable to film at the desired 96 fps, mineral oil and paint thinner were poured into the tray to slow down movement; the thinner was favored because it created more interesting 3D-like movements. Often, a short wire was shaped and dipped in to create specific patterns. Special effects designers Jim Palmer and Barney Kaelin created laser patterns, the first in any IMAX film. Overall, the space sequence took four and a half months to prepare, test, and film.

=== Post-production ===
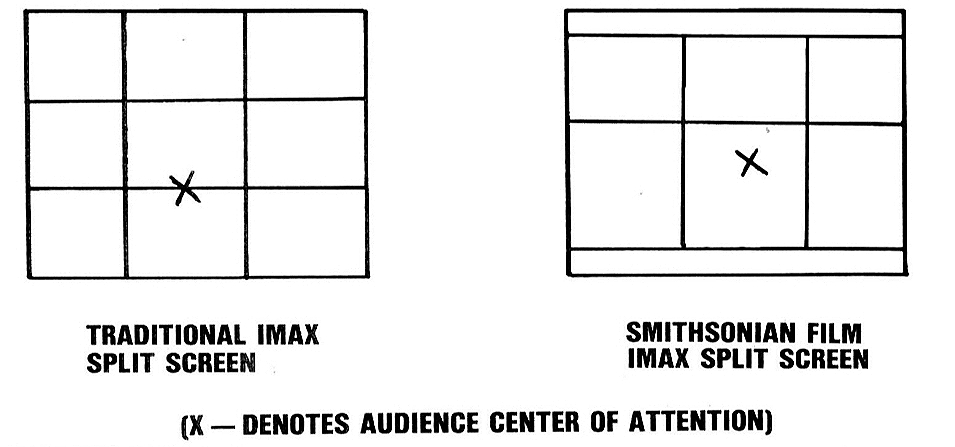
Illustration of the new mattes for the multi-image scenes

To Fly! was edited by MacGillivray and Freeman, with Alexander Hammid supervising, using a Moviola. Knowing they would experiment with the editing, the film's shots were directed beforehand to allow them to do so. The pacing of the shots was designed so that audiences can explore the entire IMAX screen. The 35 mm opening where Ezekiel is still at ground is windowboxed to 1/6th of the screen; as he ascends, the scene smash-dissolves and the whole screen is filled, intendedly to intensify the scene's mood and as a reference to aviation, which the narration calls "like the opening of a new eye". This was inspired by the opening scenes of This Is Cinerama (1952) and the first ever IMAX film North of Superior (1971).

The placing of multiple images on the same screen were occasionally used; these were inspired by the multi-image films In the Labyrinth (1967) and Tiger Child (1970), made by IMAX's precursor Multiscreen. In one scene of the Blue Angels, the screen divides into 36 duplicates of the same shot. With IMAX screens having a different focus center, thus making an evenly-divided multi-image scene confusing for audiences, Jim Liles of the Optical Department at Metro-Goldwyn-Mayer and filmmaker Dennis Earl Moore designed new mattes in which the bottom row is 15% larger than the top. Smith supervised the curation of archival and original footage to be incorporated into these scenes. After four months of editing, two Norelco AAII 70/35 mm projectors were installed to preview in the highest quality possible.

MacGillivray chose the film's score to be composed and conducted by Bernardo Segall. It was performed by a 49-piece symphony orchestra at the Burbank Studios which he considered "the most professional and experienced" in California that he could find. Segall's works were described by MacGillivray as having "an air of sophistication and elegance, which would maintain the steady rhythm and pulse of the film". The score was the first in history to use a keyed bugle, which is also depicted in the film's opening scene: at the gathering for Ezekiel's ascent, a small fanfare band plays a fife, drum, clarinet, and B♭ keyed bugle. The score was then edited by Richard R. McCurdy and mixed by Dan Wallin. It was recorded in 16 channels and then downmixed to three of the six channels on a 35 mm sound follower, which would play in sync with the picture in theaters.

Sound design was done at Todd-AO's Hollywood, Los Angeles, studio. Sam Shaw edited the sound effects while Ray West and Jack Woltz mixed them. Some scenes in the film were made solely to exploit IMAX's sound technology. For example, a multi-image scene in which two jets cross each other uses the surround nature of the sound system; MacGillivray expected audiences to "shiver" due to the dramatic shift of attention. In the train screen-hitting shot, the horn and engine noise gradually surround the audience. Joseph Ellison also helped with the sound design, which completed on June 18, 1976. After post-production, which—combined with the space sequence production—took six months, Conoco applauded the film's rough cut. The company's investors and the Smithsonian gave input for the final cut, which spanned more than 8,000 feet (2,400 metres) of film stock.

== Themes and style ==
To Fly is [...] about the uncontaminated America that we all long to see and have so much trouble finding. [It] edit[ed] out the deteriorations of which we are daily more conscious at ground level. [...] The weather is always perfect. We never get to see a rundown city, a huge and outmoded industrial complex or a countryside [...] ruined forever. [It] is what the historians call "nature's nation".

— John Russell, The New York Times (1980)

To Fly! is described as a hegemonic film on how the imagination of the American people pioneered aviation, illustrated with scenes of aircraft flying over various American landscapes. Film critic Daniel Eagan said most of the views depicted in its opening sequence are "stately, processional, celebrating the American landscape while remaining distant from it". From there, the film explores the US, triggering "some patriotic empathy." It was also viewed as a nationalist film, linking the American quest for national identity to the development of aviation through metanarratives like the linear, westward journey of Americans. Like other early IMAX films, its omniscient visual rhetoric is most distinct in the space sequence. (Note: Attributed to multiple references:) The film generally shies away from the Industrial Revolution's effects on the US in favor of displaying untouched nature. The Smithsonian said that To Fly!'s theme is: "Flight, in all its forms, is part of the Human condition, part of our Destiny". This refers to manifest destiny, a mythic cultural belief that propelled the westward expansion.

Collins said To Fly!'s style makes it "a break from the learning going on in the rest of the museum", and NASM board members said it is an amplification of visitors' fascination of flying after seeing the museum's exhibits. Film author Alison Griffiths agreed, saying that as an add-on to a museum admission, whereas the exhibits give visitors information and interest, the film gives them a sense of wonder for aviation in an effect akin to synesthesia. This is achieved through its immersive cinematography, which provides viewers with vicarious participation. Steve McKerrow of The Baltimore Sun opined certain scenes reference classic films: the train screen-hitting scene is similar to the one from The Great Train Robbery (1903); the hot air balloon scenes are reminiscent of Around the World in 80 Days (1956); and the barnstorming scene is seemingly set in the same field as the North by Northwest (1959) crop duster chase scene. As a travelogue film of the US, To Fly! was also compared to the closing sequence of This Is Cinerama. The aerial shots of various lands also signify aviation's usage in cartography, reconnaissance, resource exploration, land-use planning, and navigation.

== Release ==
=== NASM ===
"Pachelbel's Canon"
An unrelated rendition of Pachelbel's Canon, which played in To Fly!'s NASM screenings as an overture

The first press announcements of To Fly! were issued on May 16, 1976, and the film was previewed to members of the US Congress on June 24 at the NASM's IMAX theater (later renamed Samuel Pierpoint Langley, then Lockheed Martin). Two days prior to the preview, Freeman died in a helicopter crash while finding locations for a commercial at the Sierra Nevada. Grief-stricken, MacGillivray initially doubted he could continue filmmaking but decided to retain, keeping the company's name, MacGillivray Freeman Films (MFF), as a tribute.

To Fly! premiered on July 1, 1976, labeled as sponsored by Conoco. The New York City-based Lawrence Associates handled theatrical distribution. With underwriting concerns, the Smithsonian prohibited Conoco from using the Smithsonian's name for commercial uses, but granted "limited right" to use Conoco's name for it. It was later relabeled as sponsored by parent company DuPont. MacGillivray assisted the inexperienced projectionists and frequently visited the booth to ensure that the film roll was in consistently mint condition. A Pachelbel's Canon rendition was played as an overture; it was praised as being memorable and evocative. The Washington Post credited the film alongside Ordinary People (1980) for the music's popularity. The NASM also released pin-back buttons depicting a hot air balloon, manufactured by Horn Co.

The film was initially scheduled for a one-year run, as were other Bicentennial films, but was retained due to high demand. At times, there were 14 shows daily. In the 1990s, attempts were made again to remove To Fly!, but due to public grievances it was decided that a special edition be made in conjunction with the theater's digital sound system upgrade, released for its 20th anniversary in 1996. The audio was digitally remastered with new sound effects, a new narrator, and alterations of the score such as trimming, editing, and adding choral sounds. The Lake Powell-Monument Valley scene and space sequence have their music changed, and two existential narrations from the space sequence were cut. Celebrating its silver jubilee in 2001, a screening was made free. During its 35th anniversary in 2011, screenings were charged at 50 cents for adults and 25 cents for children, the same price up to the 1980s; (Note: As of 2025, 50 cents is $2, and 25 cents is $1.) in 1976, it was charged at $1 for adults and 50 cents for children, but fearing they were making too much profit, it was halved six months later. (Note: As of 2025, $1 is $6, 50 cents is $3, and 25 cents is $1.) The Airbus IMAX Theater of the NASM's annex, the Steven F. Udvar-Hazy Center, has also been screening To Fly!.

=== Other venues ===
To Fly! spurred the mass construction of IMAX theaters in various countries. The Smithsonian later also built an IMAX theater at the NMNH. Due to the film's intrigue, especially the transformative opening sequence, various museums established IMAX theaters. Other screening formats include the dome-shaped Omnimax and the digital IMAX with Laser. For the first 15 months since its opening in April 1983, To Fly! was the only film shown at the IMAX theater at the National Museum of Photography, Film & Television (NMPFT) in Bradford, England, and its reception made them retain the theater. It was rescreened in 2013 for the museum's 30th anniversary. Michael Kernan of The Washington Post credited word of mouth to the popularity because advertising was mainly via brochures, newspapers, and television. MacGillivray noted a 1981 Today interview of him and Thompson by Tom Brokaw as among the things that led to the film's continued popularity, though said he did not expect such popularity.

Several theaters played the film in a double feature, like the NASM and American Museum of Natural History's Naturemax Theater (February 11, 1982), who bundled it with Living Planet (1979) (Note: Directed by Moore and also produced by Thompson) and Man Belongs to the Earth. The NASM later replaced Living Planet with MFF's Speed (1984). To Fly! was put with Blue Planet (1990) at the Montreal and Maryland Science Center as they similarly showcase spaceflight. It was also the premiere film for IMAX theaters of theme parks like Six Flags Great America's Pictorium (1979), Dreamworld in Gold Coast, Australia (1981), and Speelland Beekse Bergen at Hilvarenbeek, Netherlands (June 19, 1981). Dreamworld founder John Longhurst was inspired to build the theater after seeing To Fly!. (Note: Attributed to multiple references:)

Overall, the film has screened in over 24 countries, including Germany, Japan, Mexico, and Indonesia (Keong Emas IMAX Theater, Jakarta). It has been translated to 10 languages and screened at around 150 theaters worldwide. It was also shown in festivals like the 1976 Toronto International Film Festival, who took it from the Edinburgh International Film Festival, and the 2019 IMAX Victoria Film Festival who made a double feature with North of Superior titled "The Dawn of IMAX Filmmaking". Conoco also distributed To Fly! to schools, organizations, and non-IMAX theaters after September 6, 1976 (Labor Day), but the lack of non-IMAX screenings made it unpopular among filmgoers. They also sent 16 mm copies of the film to all 600 existing independent television stations in the US to be aired for free, as a marketing strategy. On May 28, 2023, the non-IMAX theater Cleveland Cinematheque put it together with MFF's Great Barrier Reef (2018) and Great Bear Rainforest (2019), in a series of MFF double features.

=== Home media ===
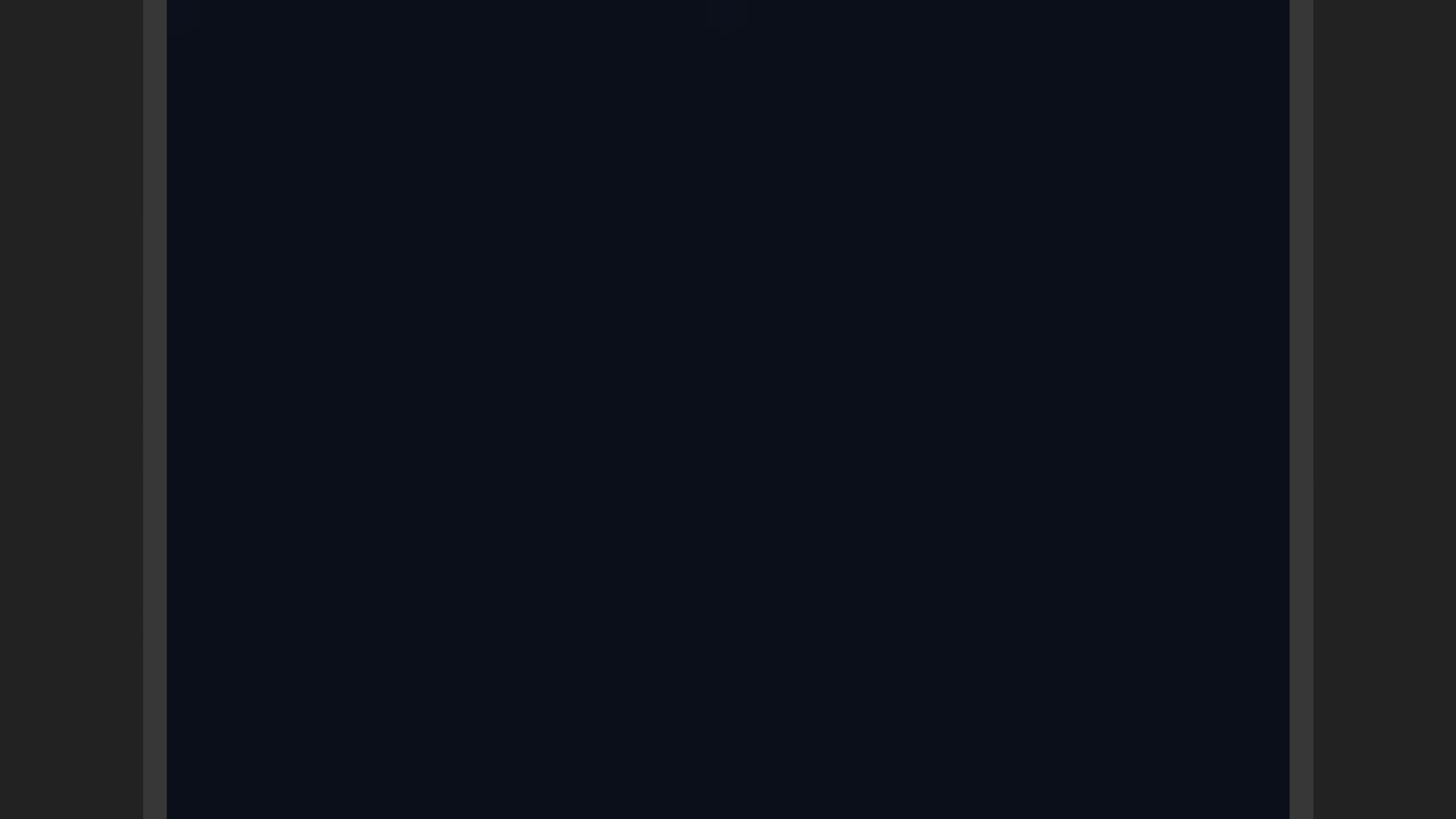
Comparison between the 1.33:1 (dark blue), 1.44:1 (light gray), and 1.78:1 aspect ratios (the entire frame)

In 1985, To Fly! was released on videocassette formats Betamax and VHS, while its LaserDisc was in 1991 by Lumivision, catalog number LVD9113. The latter, as well as a VHS of the anniversary edition by IMAX subsidiary DKP 70MM Inc., features Dolby Surround-encoded audio. On March 20, 2011, the first VHS was preserved at the Hagley Museum and Library and is freely available at their finding aid website. For the VHS, the windowboxed opening scene was zoomed to fill the entire screen, and a large portion of the opening drum roll was cut. Together with the LaserDisc and second VHS, the film is cropped to the television 1.33:1 aspect ratio, in lieu of the slightly wider IMAX 1.44:1. On October 7, 2021, MFF launched a streaming service called Movies For Families and included To Fly!'s anniversary edition, cropped to the widescreen ratio of 1.78:1. The multi-image scenes were re-adjusted, like the 36-duplicate shot which became 30.

== Reception ==
=== Box office ===
To Fly! is regarded as the first blockbuster IMAX film. (Note: Attributed to multiple references:) Over one million people watched it during its first year at the NASM, with approximately 80% of its 485 seats occupied. Initially, Collins had projected three and a half NASM visitors to view it. By 1980, it amassed more than 6.3 million viewers, with an average seat occupation of 77%, growing to 6.5 million by 1983. Over 15 million people have watched it at the museum; 4 million of which were in its three years, then 4.5 million the following year. By 1982, around 100 million audiences were recorded across the US. By 1991, over 100 million people have viewed To Fly! at schools and on television. In 1996, CBS This Morning dubbed To Fly! "the longest-running ticketed film in one location in history" and reported that it accumulated over 300 million views worldwide. From 2000 to 2012, there was an audience addition of 1.5 million at the NASM. Overall, the film is the longest-exhibited documentary and sponsored film in the world.

Museums like the NASM and NMPFT used early earnings of the film to underwrite expenses, maintain theaters, and/or fund IMAX films. It grew from $20 million in 1993—thus being the 14th highest-grossing independently distributed film in the US and Canada (excluding erotic films)— to $100 million in 1999. Up to 2000, it earned $50 million in the NASM alone. To Fly! was the third highest-grossing IMAX documentary as of 2002, earning $113 million, behind The Dream is Alive (1985, $150 million) and MFF's Everest (1998, $114 million). It gained a net addition of $2.7 million up to early 2003, then a gross $900,000 throughout the year, and another $11.3 million up to 2011. In between that, The Numbers reported over $86.6 million within the US and Canada and $34.1 million elsewhere, totaling at $120.7 million. This meant the film became the second-highest-grossing 1976 film behind Rocky, which earned $117.2 million, and above A Star is Born, which earned $63.1 million. MFF reported an overall $135 million gross as of December 2019, thus being the company's second highest-grossing documentary film after Everest.

=== Critical response ===
Can you really call yourself a Washingtonian if you haven't seen To Fly?

— John Kelly, The Washington Post (2016)

To Fly! was well-received by many film critics; John Alderson of the Chicago Sun-Times summarized that "the subject charms its imagination, while the IMAX format goes right to the brink of sensory overload". Contemporary critics called it underrated and electric, (Note: Attributed to multiple references:) with David Handler of the Newspaper Enterprise Association dubbing it "the ultimate film trip". The Washington Post called it an icon of the city and a must-watch to all Washingtonians. The film was cited by scholars and authors as exemplifying the role of screen size in amplifying a film's kinesthetic thrills. (Note: Attributed to multiple references:) Some called To Fly! one of the best IMAX films, (Note: Attributed to multiple references:) with guides like the Michelin Green Guide and one by BioScience calling it a must-watch for those planning to visit the NASM.

The cinematography was praised for its innovativeness and vertiginous aesthetics, (Note: Attributed to multiple references:) equated to theme park rides and epic films, which was further amplified by Segall's score. The Tampa Tribune rated the film three out of four stars, deeming the Horseshoe Falls and barnstorming scenes the best. The opening scene was praised for being banal which effectively shocks audiences during the giant-screen transition. (Note: Attributed to multiple references:) Donna Whitehead of Norwalk News called it intimate and stellar, and the ending uplifting. John Russell, an art critic for The New York Times, credited the cinematography to the audiences' immersion in the story, which progressively improves throughout the film. Critics called it poetic and paean-like, citing its expressive depictions of nature and aviation. (Note: Attributed to multiple references:) The film's vintage-contemporary duality was credited by The Gaffney Ledger for its nostalgic weight. Nathan Southern of AllMovie gave the film four and a half stars out of five, deeming it a visually vivid historical insight and "one of the greatest unsung landmarks of American documentary". As the filmmakers intended, Alderson likened the space sequence to that of 2001: A Space Odyssey.

The narration was praised as personal and meditative, though others found it cursory and superfluous. Some critics panned Ezekiel's character as banal and mawkish, and the omissions of real-life aviation pioneers were noted, alongside how in some shots the balloon appears to be immobile. Filmmaker Mark R. Hasan thought the Betamax audio lacks quality in the dialogue, though he noted the film is highly degraded on videocassette from the original, and said To Fly! excels starting from the barnstorming scene. While some praised its effectiveness for inspiring audiences even in smaller formats, others found its panoramas to be boring, similar to other IMAX films that are said to overexploit immersion as a gimmick. With familiarity to the later catalog of "more intrepid" IMAX films, the St. Petersburg Times found To Fly!'s impressiveness debatable for many modern first-time viewers. Because of this, the newspaper graded it C in a 1998 review. Meanwhile, documentarian Ross Anthony graded it B+, or two and a half stars out of four, noting that he would have graded it A in the 1970s, and deemed To Fly! "amusing and informative (on a basic level)".

=== Audience response ===
As the squared scene transitions to this one, audiences were heard exclaiming in awe.

The Smithsonian reported a diverse demographic of audiences, who were reportedly "astonished" by To Fly!'s IMAX vertiginous shots. Shouts and gasps were heard in screenings, especially during the opening sequence—where people exclaimed in awe—as well as at the Blue Angels and hang-gliding scenes. Others, however, screamed in fright and "hastily" left the theater during its vertiginous scenes; journalist Douglas Preston attributed this to nausea. For some, uncontrollable dizziness lingered long after the film had finished, equated by Time magazine with airsickness. Vomit bags were unavailable, making the film inaccessible for people with vertigo. Later, the NASM added pre-entry warnings about potential dizziness and motion sickness. On the contrary, some people noted they were able to watch To Fly! without getting scared due to it being illusionary.

Many who watched the film returned with their children to rewatch it, akin to a generational tradition. Similar remarks were made by Carl Sagan, who remained astonished after seeing it more than five times at the NASM. Several pilots credited the film for propelling their interest in aviation, including astronaut Terry W. Virts to whom To Fly! is his first, and among his most memorable, childhood IMAX films. Dan Moran of the Chicago Tribune said it is among the few films that kept Pictorium audiences awake instead of asleep. The 2011 Virginia earthquake coincided with To Fly!'s Horseshoe Falls scene at Lockheed Martin; projectionist Keith Madden and audiences assumed the shaking they felt came from the theater's subwoofers rather than an earthquake. Modern expert hang-gliders were surprised at the hang-gliding stunt by Wills, described as dynamic yet on an "impossibly simple craft".

Responding to the film's popularity, Bill McCabe of the DuPont Aerospace Enterprise said that because humans have a supposedly innate interest in flying, the film has a universal appeal. Several educators categorized it as educational entertainment, though with less interest among field trip groups than other IMAX documentaries. The audience response prompted the Smithsonian to write a tagline on their website: "Feel the Earth Drop Away Beneath You". "Feel" was later changed to "Watch". In 2013 to commemorate its 37th anniversary, a new poster artwork was created with the tagline "Go where dreams have wings", and in 2016, a 40th-anniversary one-minute trailer was released. MacGillivray opined that the film's "unpretentiousness and lightheartedness" makes it a form of escapism and its unconventional ending makes it "more profound and in a way, more lasting".

=== Accolades ===
By 1992, To Fly! had received 11 awards.

List of accolades received by To Fly!
Awarder	Category	Recipient(s)	Result	Ref(s)
CINE	Golden Eagle Award	To Fly!	Won	
Chicago International Film Festival	Best Film Award	To Fly!	Won	
Chicago International Film Festival	Special Jury Award (Cinematography)	To Fly!	Won	
Berlin Inforfilm Festival	N/A	To Fly!	First	
Bicentennial Festival of Films on Aeronautics and Space	N/A	To Fly!	Grand	
Festival of the Americas	Special Jury Award	To Fly!	Won	
Columbus International Film Festival	Chris Bronze Plaque Award	To Fly!	Won	
Information Film Producers Association	Best Documentary of the Decade	To Fly!	Won	

== Legacy ==
To Fly! is regarded as an influential IMAX film, with filmmaker and author Lenny Lipton calling it the giant-screen film industry's "signature film". Jon Wilkman, writing for Literary Hub, listed the film in 2020 as one of the "21 Documentaries That Redefined the Genre". In 1980, Kernan listed the film as one of the top reasons people visited Washington, D.C., alongside the Washington Monument and J. Edgar Hoover Building. It also has a significant history with political figures, viewed by heads of state from Egypt, Greece, Indonesia, Spain, and the United Kingdom. During his first inauguration in 1981, US President Ronald Reagan handed a copy of it to Soviet General Secretary Mikhail Gorbachev, and later showed it to him while in Moscow. When George H. W. Bush met Israeli Prime Minister Yitzhak Shamir in 1989, they went to the NASM and watched To Fly!.

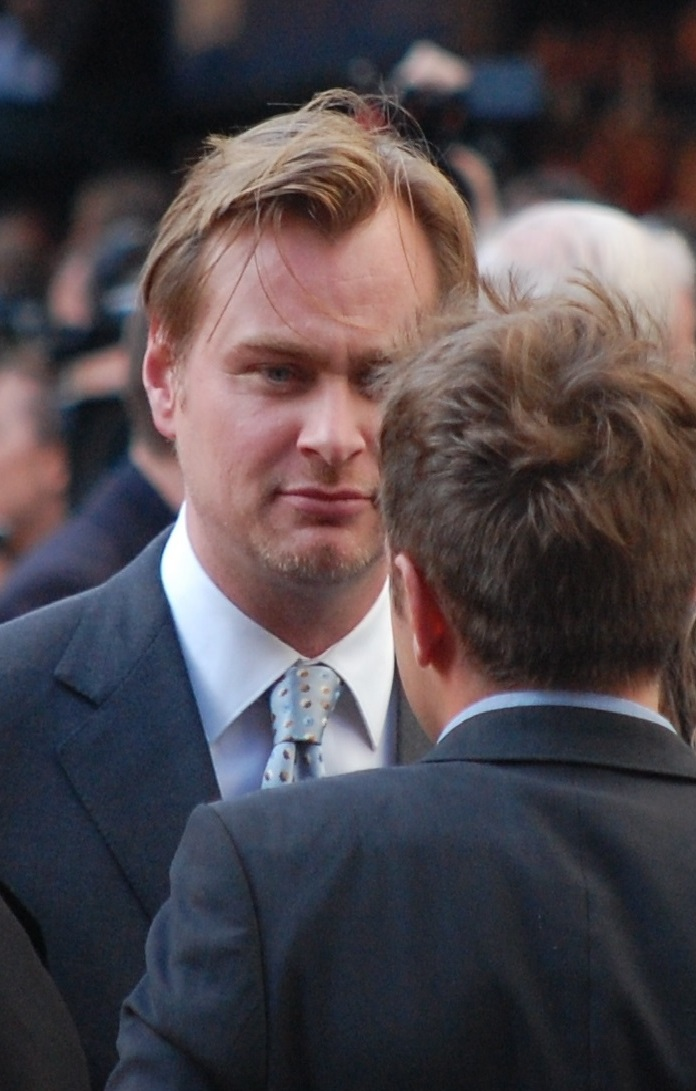
Christopher Nolan at the premiere of his film The Dark Knight (2008), whose IMAX cinematography was inspired by To Fly! and consulted by MacGillivray

Contrary to popular belief, the film is not the first in IMAX, though was instrumental in introducing more people to the format. This was acknowledged by IMAX filmmakers like Kieth Merrill of Grand Canyon: The Hidden Secrets (1984), and Ron Fricke who decided to film Chronos (1985) in IMAX after seeing To Fly!, regretting not shooting his more-popular film Koyaanisqatsi (1982) with it. Brian J. Terwilliger theatrically premiered his IMAX film Living in the Age of Airplanes (2015) at Lockheed Martin as a tribute to To Fly! which he watched as a teenager. Christopher Nolan watched the film at the age of 14 and noticed the audience tilting their heads during the aerial scenes; MacGillivray also consulted him on the IMAX cameras for The Dark Knight (2008), the first major feature-length film to be shot on IMAX and whose aerial scenes were inspired by To Fly!. After watching the film, scientist Anatoly Sagalevich ideated the underwater IMAX film Titanica (1992) to filmmaker Stephen Low.

The film was also cited as a great influence on the legitimization of IMAX and multi-image scenes in IMAX films, which has been common practice ever since. A reviewer urged major film companies to "watch out", predicting To Fly! would set IMAX as a leading film format over Cinerama and 3D. In 1995, the Library of Congress deemed To Fly! a pioneer of the format, thus culturally, historically, and aesthetically significant for the National Film Registry, an American film preservation effort, which archived its reduction prints. Voters at the Giant Screen Theater Association included it in the IMAX Hall of Fame on September 24, 2001, a decision praised by IMAX's then-co-chief executive officers Richard Gelfond and Bradley J. Wechsler, stating the film deserves such recognition.

In 1980, the NASM requested another IMAX film, prompting Moore to collaborate with MacGillivray on Flyers (1982), which Conoco funded and became a box-office success too. MFF continued making IMAX documentaries, two of which were nominated for the Academy Award for Best Documentary Short Subject: The Living Sea (1995), also inducted into the IMAX Hall of Fame; and Dolphins, which was the highest-grossing documentary of 2000. Still active, the company is regarded one of the most influential IMAX figures with over $1 billion of box-office earnings. In 1996, MacGillivray released The Magic of Flight, a film about the Blue Angels which serves as the spiritual sequel of To Fly!'s scene featuring the squadron.

== See also ==
- Denver & Rio Grande Railroad, whose tender is used for the train scene
- Sonnet 18, whose concluding couplet is recited by one of the film's characters
- Travel Air 4000, flown in the barnstorming scene
