= Ancient Caves =

2020 giant-screen documentary film

- Directed by: Jonathan Bird
- Cinematography: Jonathan Bird, Tim Geers, Zach Peterson
- Production companies: Oceanic Research Group, Inc.
- Distributed by: MacGillivray Freeman Films
- Release date: 6 March 2020
- Country: United States
- Language: English

Ancient Caves is a 2020 American giant-screen documentary film directed by Jonathan Bird. The film explores underwater cave systems and scientific research into submerged environments. The film is distributed by MacGillivray Freeman Films and exhibited in IMAX and other giant-screen theaters.

== Production ==
Ancient Caves was produced by Oceanic Research Group. The film features underwater cinematography documenting cave exploration and geological formations. Actor Bryan Cranston served as narrator.

== Plot ==
Ancient Caves explores underwater cave systems around the world, documenting geological formations and the processes that shape them. The film follows scientists and explorers as they investigate submerged caves and the environmental records preserved within them. The film features cave scientist Gina Moseley, whose research in paleoclimatology examines how cave formations such as stalactites and stalagmites preserve evidence of past climate conditions. The film illustrates how changes in sea level and climate over thousands to millions of years have influenced cave formation. The film also highlights the challenges of underwater cave exploration and the techniques used by divers to navigate and study these environments.

== Release ==
Ancient Caves premiered on March 6, 2020, at the Science Museum of Minnesota's IMAX Dome theater in Saint Paul. The film was subsequently exhibited in IMAX and other giant-screen theaters, including science centers and aquariums. Coverage of the film appeared in media outlets including CBS News and Global News. The film received awards from the Giant Screen Cinema Association, including Best Film, Best Cinematography, and Best Film for Lifelong Learning. The film received positive reviews for its cinematography and immersive presentation.
