= Jonathan Bird =

American underwater cinematographer and television host

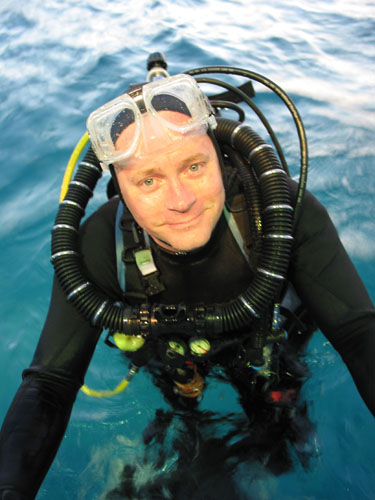
- Bird in 2007
- Born: March 1969 (age 57)
- Education: Electrical engineering
- Occupations: Cinematographer, photographer, director, television host
- Spouse: Christine Bird
- Children: Elise Bird, Liam Bird
- Awards: International Scuba Diving Hall of Fame
- Website: www.jonathanbird.net

Jonathan Bird (born March 1969) is an American underwater cinematographer, photographer, director and television host known for his work in marine filmmaking. He is the creator, host and producer of the Emmy Award–winning public television series Jonathan Bird's Blue World.

Bird has produced underwater films for broadcast and educational distribution, with his work appearing on networks including PBS, National Geographic Channel and Discovery Channel.

His cinematography has earned nine Emmy Awards and two CINE Golden Eagle Awards.

In addition to television production, Bird has directed large-format documentary films for IMAX and giant-screen theaters, including Astronaut: Ocean to Orbit (2015), Ancient Caves (2020), Secrets of the Sea (2022), and Call of the Dolphins (2025).

== Underwater photography ==
Bird learned to scuba dive while in college at Worcester Polytechnic Institute.

He worked as an electrical engineer before leaving his position in 1993 to pursue underwater photography full-time.

His first book, Beneath the North Atlantic, was published in 1997.

== Cinematography ==
Bird co-founded Oceanic Research Group, Inc. in 1991.

The organization became a non-profit in 1993 and produced educational marine science films for schools.

His first television film, Sharks: The Real Story, aired on PBS in 1995.

In 2005, he completed Sharks: Deep Trouble for National Geographic.

His film Ancient Caves (2020) received Giant Screen Cinema Association awards including Best Film, Best Cinematography and Best Film for Lifelong Learning.

== Jonathan Bird’s Blue World ==
Premiering in 2008, the series was distributed to public television through NETA.

The series has received multiple Emmy Awards, including recognition for Outstanding Magazine/Feature Segment and Children/Youth Programming.

Beginning in 2012, episodes were released on YouTube, where the channel has attracted over one million subscribers. It is also distributed on the educational platform Epic!.

== Selected filmography ==
- Sharks: The Real Story (1995)
- Beneath The North Atlantic (1998)
- Sharks: Deep Trouble (2005)
- Jonathan Bird's Blue World (2008–present)
- Astronaut: Ocean to Orbit (2015)
- Ancient Caves (2020)
- Secrets of the Sea (2022)
- Call of the Dolphins (2025)

== Scientific contributions ==
Bird has contributed to marine science literature. In 1997, he was a co-author of an early paper documenting in situ observations of a live oarfish, Regalecus glesne, published in Copeia. The paper is considered a foundational in situ observation of the Oarfish.

Bird also co-authored research on sea lamprey parasitism of sharks and teleost fishes, published in Comparative Biochemistry and Physiology Part A in 2004.

Bird's underwater photography and video footage have also been incorporated into peer-reviewed marine science research, including studies of Atlantic wolffish behavior and Hawaiian monk seal vocalizations.

== Awards and honors ==
- 9 Emmy Awards
- 2 CINE Golden Eagle Awards
- Inducted into the International Scuba Diving Hall of Fame (2019)
- NOGI Award in the Arts category (2026)
- Worcester Polytechnic Institute Ichabod Washburn Alumni Award (2000)

== Personal life ==
Bird lives in Massachusetts with his wife and two children. He is the grandson of Kenneth T. Bird, a pioneer in telemedicine.
