= Wiedenkeller =

Wiedenkeller is a Germanic surname. Notable people with the surname include:

- Michael Wiedenkeller (born 1963), Swedish-Luxembourgian chess player
- Tim Weed (born Timothy James Wiedenkeller in 1959), American multi-instrumentalist and singer-songwriter
