= Robert Andrew Parker =

American illustrator (1927–2023)

- Born: Robert Andrew Parker; 4 May 1927; Norfolk, Virginia,
- Died: 27 December 2023 (aged 96); Cornwall, Connecticut
- Education: Art Institute of Chicago
- Known for: Painting, printmaking, drawing
- Movement: Expressionism
- Spouses: Dorothy Daniels (divorced) Judith Mellecker (death)
- Children: (5) Christopher, Anthony, Eric Geoff, and Nicholas

Robert Andrew Parker (May 14, 1927 – December 27, 2023) was an American painter and watercolorist who was widely known for illustrating magazines, album covers, and books for over 70 years. Afflicted by macular degeneration in his later years, he nevertheless managed to continue working well into his 90s. Parker received the 1970 Caldecott Honor for his work in Pop Corn and Ma Goodness by Edna Mitchell Preston.

== Early life ==
Parker was born in Norfolk, Virginia, on May 14, 1927. Parker's father was a dentist who worked for the U.S. Public Health service. His mother was an amateur artist who encouraged Parker to follow artistic pursuits. Afflicted with tuberculosis as a child, Parker's family moved to New Mexico, taking advantage of the drier climate hoping to improve Parker's health. Unable to attend school because of his health, Parker spent several years sketching and painting under the tutelage of his mother. After his health improved, Parker enlisted in the Army as a mechanic.

== Career ==
Following his enlistment, Parker attended the Art Institute of Chicago, graduating with bachelor's degree in 1952. Following a number of showings, capturing the attention of New York art critics, Metro-Goldwyn-Mayer hired Parker in 1956 to assist with the production of Lust for Life, the biographical film of Vincent van Gogh starring Kirk Douglas. The studio's concept was to film Parker's hands, in lieu of Douglas' hands, creating van Gogh's paintings. However, Douglas and Parker only used that technique for Wheatfield with Crows with Parker painting other replicas by himself for use as the film's backdrops.

During his career, Parker painted album covers for jazz musicians Thelonious Monk, Duke Ellington, Art Tatum, and Dave Brubeck. He also illustrated several books written by Melvin B. Zisfein, Marianne Moore, and Sandra Jordan. His illustrations for Ballet of the Elephants by Leda Schubert was praised by art critics and his illustrations for the children's book Pop Corn and Ma Goodness won him the Randolph Caldecott Medal, the highest honor for illustrating a children's book. Parker illustrated numerous magazine to include The New Yorker, Playboy, Penthouse, Fortune, Sports Illustrated, Esquire, Time and other magazines.

== Personal life ==
Parker was married twice. His first marriage, to Dorothy Daniels, yielded five children but ended in divorce. His second marriage to Judith Mellecker ended with her death in August 2023. In 2000, Parker notice that his vision was deteriorating and he was subsequently diagnosed with macular degeneration. Parker died in West Cornwall, Connecticut, on December 27, 2023, at the age of 96.

Parker's works are held primarily in the collections of the Metropolitan Museum of Art in New York, the Los Angeles County Museum of Art, the Art Institute of Chicago.
