= Greece: Secrets of the Past =

2006 short documentary film

- Directed by: Greg MacGillivray
- Written by: Stephen Judson; Jon Boorstin
- Produced by: Alec Lorimore; Greg MacGillivray
- Narrated by: Nia Vardalos
- Cinematography: Brad Ohlund
- Edited by: Stephen Judson
- Music by: Steve Wood
- Production companies: MacGillivray Freeman Films; Canadian Museum of Civilization
- Distributed by: MacGillivray Freeman Films
- Release date: February 16, 2006
- Running time: 45 minutes
- Country: United States
- Language: English
- Box office: $220,941

Greece: Secrets of the Past is a 2006 American short IMAX documentary film about the Golden Age of Greece. It was produced by the same team behind Everest-MacGillivray Freeman Films. Set throughout the Greek Isles, the film depicts both contemporary archeological digs and historical depictions/reenactments of such events as the Minoan eruption and the original splendor of the Parthenon. The film also delves into Classical Greek advancements such as philosophy, theatre, democracy, and the Olympics. The film is narrated by Nia Vardalos.
