= Coral Reef Adventure =

- Directed by: Greg MacGillivray
- Written by: Jack Stephens; Osha Gray Davidson; Stephen Judson
- Starring: Howard Hall; Michele Hall; Jean-Michel Cousteau
- Narrated by: Liam Neeson
- Cinematography: Brad Ohlund
- Edited by: Stephen Judson
- Music by: Crosby, Stills & Nash
- Distributed by: MacGillivray Freeman Films
- Release date: February 14, 2003
- Running time: 45 minutes
- Country: United States
- Language: English
- Budget: $10 million

Coral Reef Adventure is a documentary film released in 2003 to IMAX theaters. It was directed by Greg MacGillivray and narrated by Liam Neeson.

Embarking on a 10-month expedition through the islands of the South Pacific, husband and wife underwater photography-duo Michele and Howard Hall explore the declining reefs and failing health of the world's oceans. From Australia's Great Barrier Reef, to a friend's coral reef-sustained village in Fiji, the diving expeditions show a range of coral reefs, from flourishing ones filled with unusual and exotic inhabitants, to vast stretches of bleached coral decline which prompted the Hall's activism. Along their journey, scientists working to understand and save the reefs meet with the Hall's.

Jean-Michel Cousteau, son of the famed oceanographer Jacques Cousteau, also makes an appearance, as do well-known dive guide and singer Rusi Vulakoro, brother of Vude singer Laisa Vulakoro, who guides the Halls in their dive adventure.

This documentary film is the third ecologically-themed IMAX production from director MacGillivray, after The Living Sea and Dolphins. Crosby Stills & Nash contribute to the film's soundtrack. The Giant Screen Theater Association named it the best film achievement of 2003.
