= Bernardo Segall =

Brazilian-born American composer and concert pianist (1911–1993)

Bernardo Segall (August 4, 1911 – November 26, 1993) was a Brazilian-born American composer and concert pianist.

== Life ==
Bernardo Segall made his professional debut as a pianist at age 9 in his native Campinas, Brazil. At Age 16 he traveled to the United States, where he studied with Alexander Siloti and, at 21, made his American debut at New York's Town Hall, later performing in orchestras such as the New York Philharmonic. Segall also had an uncle who was a well-known painter in Brazil, Lasar Segall. In addition to performing as a concert pianist, Bernardo Segall also maintained an additional career as a composer for theater, ballet, film and television. Segall was married to dancer and choreographer Valerie Bettis for 12 years, and he composed many pieces that she danced in. He scored films such as The Great St. Louis Bank Robbery starring Steve McQueen, The Luck of Ginger Coffey and Custer of the West, and wrote music for TV series including Columbo, Airwolf, Nichols (TV series), and the 1976 documentary To Fly!. Segall died in 1993.

== Selected filmography ==
- The Great St. Louis Bank Robbery (1959)
- The Luck of Ginger Coffey (1964)
- Hallucination Generation (1967)
- Custer of the West (1967)
- Loving (1970)
- Night Slaves (1970)
- The Garden of Aunt Isabel (1971)
- Moon of the Wolf (1972)
- The Girl Most Likely to... (1973)
- Homebodies (1974)
