= Journey to the South Pacific =

- Theatrical poster
- Directed by: Greg MacGillivray
- Written by: Stephen Judson
- Produced by: Mark Krenzian; Shaun Macgillivray
- Narrated by: Cate Blanchett
- Cinematography: Brad Ohlund (principal); Howard Hall; Peter Kragh (2D); Greg MacGillivray; Shaun Macgillivray; Robert Walker
- Edited by: Stephen Judson; Jonathan P. Shaw
- Music by: Steve Wood
- Production company: MacGillivray Freeman Films
- Distributed by: IMAX
- Release date: November 27, 2013
- Running time: 40 minutes
- Country: United States
- Language: English
- Box office: $14.1 million

Journey to the South Pacific is a 2013 IMAX documentary film directed by Greg MacGillivray. It was narrated by Cate Blanchett.

The film contains a strong message of marine conservation in the unique ecosystems of the Coral Triangle of Indonesia, while showcasing the island life of the native population.
