= Valerie Bettis =

American dancer and choreographer (1919–1982)

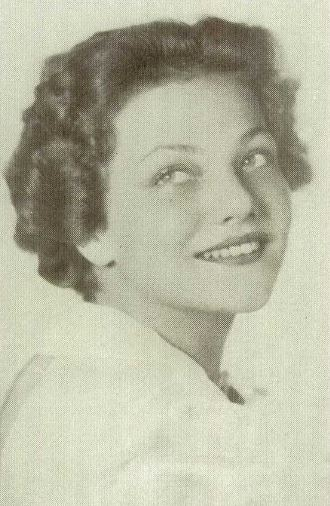
- Born: December 20, 1919; Houston, Texas, U.S.
- Died: September 26, 1982 (aged 62); New York City, U.S.
- Occupations: Dancer; choreographer; actress
- Years active: 1949–1961
- Spouses: Bernardo Segall (1943-1955); Arthur A. Schmidt (1959-1969) his death

Valerie Elizabeth Bettis (December 1919 – September 26, 1982) was an American modern dancer and choreographer. She found success in musical theatre, ballet and as a solo dancer.

== Biography ==
Valerie Bettis was born in 1919 on either December 19 or December 20, in Houston, Texas. Her parents were Royal Holt Bettis and Valerie Elizabeth Bettis (née McCarthy). Her father died when she was 13 years old, after which her mother married Hugh Prather. In 1943, Bettis married Bernardo Segall, who was then her company's music director, though the marriage ended in divorce in 1955. In 1959, she married Arthur A. Schmidt who died in 1969. On September 26, 1982, Bettis died at Beth Israel Medical Center in Manhattan at the age of 62.

== Career ==
Bettis found success both as a modern dancer and as a choreographer, often both in the same production. She was known for her "versatility, vivid stage presence, and flamboyant theatricality".

=== Early career ===
Bettis began taking ballet lessons in Houston at the age of 10. While in high school, she participated in her school's dramas and musicals. She attended the University of Texas for only one year, where she was a member of Kappa Alpha Theta, before moving to New York City to study modern dance under Hanya Holm. She performed and toured with Holm's company from 1937 tto 1940.

In 1941, Bettis formed her own dance ensemble and began her career as a solo dancer. She found early success with her 1943 solo dance The Desperate Heart, which incorporated the poem of the same name by John Malcolm Brinnin. The New York Times' dance critic, John Martin, listed it among the most outstanding performances of 1943. Louis Horst described The Desperate Heart as "the finest solo work in the entire modern dance repertory of this decade".

=== Ballet ===
In 1947, Bettis choreographed with a major ballet company. Her production of Virginia Sampler, as performed by the Ballet Russe de Monte Carlo, was called "an interesting and unsuccessful experiment". In 1948, she adapted, directed and choreographed William Faulkner's novel As I Lay Dying, fusing acting and dance into a dance play. John Martin, The New York Times' dance critic, called it "a completely authoritative work of art". Doris Hering of Dance Magazine wrote, "Only an artist with the deepest feeling for movement and drama could have worked the wonders Miss Bettis did with the material at hand." Bettis's next attempt at a dance play, Domino Furioso, which was premiered at the 1949 American Dance Festival, was less successful, attracting mixed reviews: "attractive" and "easy to take in", Hering this time wrote, "If Miss Bettis is not careful she will talk us all to death." Bettis found success in 1952 when she choreographed a ballet based on the Tennessee Williams play, A Streetcar Named Desire. Critics described it as "gripping" and a "stunning, explosive creation".

=== Musical theatre ===
Bettis first tried her hand at musical comedies when she choreographed and performed in Glad to See You in 1944. In 1948, she won a Theatre World Award for her performance in Inside U.S.A., a revue that ran for nearly 400 performances at the New Century Theatre and the Majestic Theatre. Her performance in the 1950 revue Bless You All was praised by Life magazine both for her dancing and for her singing abilities.

=== Movies ===
Rita Hayworth's dances to the songs "Trinidad Lady" and "I've Been Kissed Before" in the 1952 movie Affair in Trinidad, as well as the "Dance of the Seven Veils" in the 1953 movie Salome, were choreographed by Valerie Bettis.

Year	Title	Role	Notes
1952	Affair in Trinidad	Veronica Huebling	
1953	Let's Do It Again	Lilly Adair	

== Selected choreography ==
- The Desperate Heart (1943)
- Yerma (1946)
- Virginia Sampler (1947)
- As I Lay Dying (1948)
- Domino Furioso (1949)
- The Golden Round (1955)
- The Past Perfect Hero (1958)
- Closed Door (1959)
- Early Voyagers (1960)
- Songs and Processions (1964)
- Echoes of Spoon River (1976)
