= Dream Big: Engineering Our World =

- Movie poster
- Directed by: Greg MacGillivray
- Produced by: Shaun MacGillivray
- Narrated by: Jeff Bridges
- Cinematography: Brad Ohlund
- Edited by: Jason E. Paul; Stephen Judson; Mark Fletcher
- Music by: John Jennings Boyd
- Distributed by: MacGillivray Freeman Films
- Release date: February 17, 2017 (California Science Center)
- Running time: 42 minutes
- Country: United States
- Language: English

Dream Big: Engineering Our World is a 2017 American documentary short about modern engineering and its significance. It was directed by Greg MacGillivray and narrated by Jeff Bridges.

== Participants ==
The following people appeared in the documentary:

- Avery Bang
- Steve Burrows
- Angelica Hernandez
- Fredi Lajvardi
- Menzer Pehlivan

== Release ==
The film was shown at the California Science Center on February 17, 2017.

== Reception ==
The film has a 100% rating on Rotten Tomatoes. Sandie Angulo Chen of Common Sense Media awarded the film four stars out of five.

Nick Schager of Variety gave the film a positive review and wrote that it "proves a rousing, and ravishing, call-to-engineering-arms for future generations, and should receive a welcome reception from its young target audience."

Sheri Linden of The Hollywood Reporter also gave the film a positive review and wrote, "But though the shifts can be abrupt, the film provides an overview of a huge topic with admirable concision."
