= Speed (1984 film) =

1984 documentary film by Greg MacGillivray

- Internet promotional poster
- Directed by: Greg MacGillivray
- Written by: Greg MacGillivray; Steven Henschel; James Foster
- Produced by: Greg MacGillivray
- Narrated by: James Burke
- Cinematography: Greg MacGillivray
- Edited by: Stephen Judson
- Music by: Steve Wood
- Distributed by: MacGillivray Freeman Films
- Release date: 1984
- Running time: 29 minutes
- Country: United States
- Language: English

Speed is a 1984 documentary film directed by Greg MacGillivray that examines humanity's obsession with speed across various domains, including auto racing and aerospace. It features thrilling visuals and highlights the achievements of notable speed enthusiasts. The film presents an exploration of speed's impact on culture and technology.

== Summary ==
The film begins with a primitive hunter-gatherer attempting to kill a deer to no avail, and then being chased by a tiger; he then jumps to the sea. The narrator, historian James Burke, remarks that humans have always desired to move faster than the status quo, even at the risk of one's life; this film examines that desire. Henceforth, it is divided into five parts: "The Dawn of Original Thinking", "The Engine Revolution", "The Sky Has No Limit", "Faster than Man", and "We Have Just Begun to Crawl".

In 1839, Kirkpatrick Macmillan modified the wheel and invented the first self-propelled bicycle using the principle of leverage, which could travel at approximately 10 miles per hour (16 km/h). Later improvements allow for bicycles to go up to 40 miles per hour (64 km/h), despite various factors like gravity, friction, and wind resistance. The film then depicts the velomobile, whose streamlined enclosure allows for less wind resistance, hence moving six times as fast as the bicycle. The 1900s saw the invention of the Stanley Steamer, breaking a world record of 127 miles per hour (204 km/h). With the creation of the internal combustion engine, cars began to travel at faster speeds, inadvertently increasing the risk of accidents, prevalent with hot rods. The film demonstrates this by depicting Billy Vukovich, who would win the Indianapolis 500 in 1953 and 1954, before being killed in the 1955 race. The introduction of auto racing further increased the top speed of cars, culminating with jet dragsters at 320 miles per hour (510 km/h).

Although airplanes are significant as vehicles free from ground constraints, attempts to break the sound barrier failed fatally, until the invention of the rocket-powered Bell X-1 in 1947, with Chuck Yeager flying it at 700 miles per hour (1,100 km/h). This launched a series of supersonic aircraft production, the fastest bring the Lockheed SR-71 Blackbird with a top speed of 3,400 miles per hour (5,500 km/h). The film then depicts the Blue Angels, whose movements are equated to auto racing. In 1969, astronauts of the Apollo 10 were returning to Earth from the Moon, reaching up to 24,791 miles per hour (39,897 km/h).

Burke reveals that humans travel more than three billion miles (4.8×10^{9} km) a year. Speed becomes an important element in every aspect of human life, such as communications. While some opine that this fast-paced society only causes fatal stress, the film also highlights stress-relieving and recreational manifestations of speed, such as ultralight aviation, surfing, hiking in sailing, skiing, and roller coasters. While the top speed humans can achieve will increase dramatically in the near future, it will not compare to the fastest speed according to Albert Einstein, the speed of light. However, scientists have begun to wonder if the true achievable top speed are only limited by one's imagination. The film ends with a surreal visualization of the speed of light progressively going faster towards the Sun.

== Reception ==
The film received positive reviews for its stunning cinematography and engaging storytelling, appealing to both motorsport enthusiasts and general audiences.

== Cast ==
- Monty Cox as Hunter
- Shane McCamey as Kirkpatrick MacMillan
- Linda Hoy as Scottish Lady
- Omri Katz as Scottish Laddie
- Andy Muxlow as Scottish Laddie
- Lee S. Brock as Bill Vukovich (as Lee Brock)
- Kathy Graber as Ellen
- Leif Green as Danny

== Legacy ==
Speed remains an influential work in the documentary genre, often referenced in discussions about speed and innovation in sports.
