= Gina Moseley =

British paleoclimatologist and explorer

Gina E. Moseley
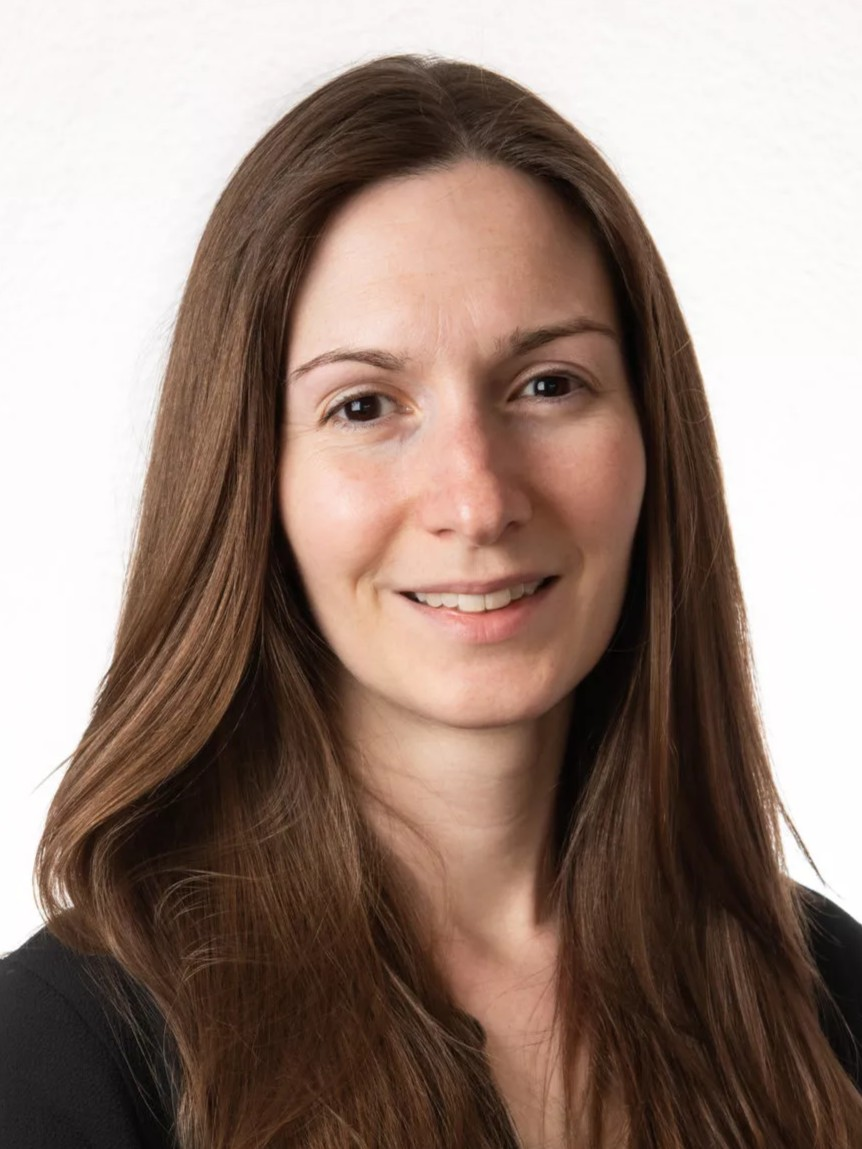
- Born: 1984 (age 41–42); Walsall, United Kingdom
- Education: University of Bristol (PhD), University of Birmingham (B.Sc.)
- Scientific career
- Fields: Geology, paleoclimatology, speleology
- Workplaces: University of Innsbruck

Gina E. Moseley is a British geologist, paleoclimatologist, and polar explorer. She is an assistant professor of palaeoclimatology at the University of Innsbruck, where she leads the Greenland Caves Project, and previously held the Ingeborg Hochmair Professorship at the same institution from 2018 to 2022. Moseley is a Fellow of the Royal Geographical Society and a member of the Young Austrian Academy of Sciences.

She specializes in reconstructing the Earth's climate history by analyzing speleothem samples collected from remote cave systems. Her research in the High Arctic has extended local climate records back up to 10 million years, surpassing the 128,000-year temporal limit of traditional ice core data.

== Early life and education ==
Gina Moseley was born in Walsall in 1984. She developed an interest in caving at the age of 12 during a family holiday in Somerset.

She completed undergraduate studies in physical geography at the University of Birmingham. She subsequently earned her Ph.D. from the University of Bristol in 2009; her doctoral thesis was titled Quaternary sea-level change in the circum-Caribbean region. Moseley later completed her Habilitation in Earth Sciences at the University of Innsbruck with a thesis titled Improving Understanding of Rapid Climate Change Events and Past Warm Periods in the Quaternary.

== Career and research ==
Following post-doctoral research dating meteorites at the University of Manchester, Moseley relocated to the University of Innsbruck in 2011 to focus on speleothem-based paleoclimate reconstructions. In 2015, she became an Austrian Science Fund (FWF) Hertha Firnberg Fellow. She went on to establish the world's first Arctic speleothem research group at the university.

Moseley's methodology utilizes uranium-thorium dating and stable isotope analysis on cave mineral deposits to construct high-resolution climate records. Her research extends beyond the Arctic, encompassing studies on the paleohydrology of southwest Nevada at Devils Hole, millennial-scale climate variability in the northern Alps (the NALPS19 record), permafrost variability in the British Isles during the Younger Dryas, and the dating of Late Palaeolithic cave art and permafrost in the Ural Mountains.

== Greenland Caves Project ==
Moseley is the founder and expedition lead of the Greenland Caves Project. Because speleothems only form when the local climate is temperate enough to support flowing liquid water, extracting samples from regions currently covered by permafrost provides direct evidence of past interglacial warm periods. Moseley's extraction of ancient speleothem calcite has demonstrated that Greenland experienced significantly milder climates millions of years ago, providing baseline data used to model modern global warming impacts.

== Public outreach ==
Moseley engages in science communication regarding paleoclimatology and polar exploration. She is the main protagonist in the 2020 giant-screen documentary film Ancient Caves, produced by MacGillivray Freeman.

== Awards ==
- The Explorers Club 50 (2023): Named as one of fifty individuals changing the world through exploration.
- Royal Geographical Society (Fellow)
