= Adventures in Wild California =

- Cover of DVD release
- Directed by: Greg MacGillivray
- Written by: Mark Krenzien
- Produced by: Jan Baird (executive); Mark Krenzien; Bob Kresser (executive); Ryan Kresser (executive); Alec Lorimore; Greg MacGillivray
- Starring: Susan Campbell; Jeff Clark; Roy E. Disney; Troy Hartman; Bryan Iguchi; Cory Lloyd; Stephen C. Sillett
- Narrated by: Jimmy Smits
- Cinematography: Greg MacGillivray; Brad Ohlund
- Edited by: Jim Foster
- Music by: Stu Goldberg; Mark Edward Lewis; Daniel May; Karl Preusser; Steve Wood
- Production company: MacGillivray Freeman Films
- Distributed by: IMAX Corporation
- Release date: May 3, 2000
- Running time: 41 minutes
- Country: United States
- Language: English

Adventures in Wild California is a documentary film showcasing the scenery and extreme sports found in California. It is narrated by Jimmy Smits and was released to IMAX theaters in 2000. The film is directed by Greg MacGillivray and features songs (including a cover of "Go Your Own Way") by musician Lindsey Buckingham.

"Greg MacGillivray was named “Man of the Year” in 2001 and installed in the California Tourism Hall of Fame for this film.", recalls the Giant Screen Cinema Association.

== Content ==
The film contains a sequence of big wave surfing filmed at Maverick's.

== Reception ==
The film "captures the natural wonders of the Golden State", according to TV guide.
