= Grand Canyon Adventure: River at Risk =

- Theatrical release poster
- Directed by: Greg MacGillivray
- Written by: Jack Stephens; Stephen Judson
- Produced by: Greg MacGillivray; Shaun MacGillivray; Mark Krenzien
- Narrated by: Robert Redford
- Cinematography: Brad Ohlund; Greg MacGillivray; Jack Tankard; Ron Goodman
- Edited by: Stephen Judson
- Music by: Dave Matthews Band; Stefan Lessard; Steve Wood
- Distributed by: MacGillivray Freeman Films
- Release date: March 12, 2008
- Running time: 44 minutes
- Country: United States
- Language: English

Grand Canyon Adventure: River at Risk is a 2008 American documentary film directed by Greg MacGillivray and narrated by Robert Redford. It was released to IMAX 3D Theaters in 2008.

Anthropologist Wade Davis and river advocate Robert F. Kennedy Jr journey down the Colorado River on a two-week expedition to highlight water conservation issues. Traveling by rafts, kayaks and wooden dories, they are accompanied by their daughters and guided by Shana Watahomigie, a Native American National Park ranger. The film explores America's drought and freshwater shortages, the impact on the river of damming, and human water supply needs, such as that of the city of Las Vegas.

Shot in four weeks almost entirely on the Colorado River, the challenging production, which features the first 3D IMAX images of the Grand Canyon, took the 350-pound 3D IMAX camera through its paces and involved the cooperation of three Indian nations, the National Park Service, film sponsor Teva's team of kayakers and more than a dozen experienced river guides. The production represents the largest filmmaking expedition in the canyon's recent history and the last major film production of its magnitude to be shot in the canyon due to new protective restrictions on the number of crew members and equipment allowed.

The film is directed by IMAX director and cinematographer Greg MacGillivray, who previously explored similar conservation themes in his Academy Award-nominated films The Living Sea (1995) and Dolphins (2000), also filmed for IMAX Theaters.

The film won Best Cinematography of the Year and a Special Achievement in Filmmaking Award for the opening 3D title sequence from the Giant Screen Cinema Association. It also won a Golden Reel Award for Best Sound Editing by the Motion Picture Sound Editors USA and was nominated for a VES Award for Outstanding Visual Effects by the Visual Effects Society.

== Soundtrack ==
Music is contributed by Dave Matthews Band and guest musicians including banjoist Tim Weed. Dave Matthews bass guitarist Stefan Lessard also co-wrote the original score, with composer Steve Wood.

Songs that were played by Dave Matthews Band: "Lie in Our Graves," "Steady As We Go," "Mother, Father," "Satellite," "Two Step," and "The Space Between."
