= Wolves (1999 film) =

- Directed by: David Douglas
- Produced by: Pietro L.Serapiglia & Goulam Amarsy
- Narrated by: Robbie Robertson
- Cinematography: David Douglas
- Music by: Michel Cusson
- Distributed by: IMAX
- Release date: March 1, 1999
- Running time: 41 minutes
- Country: United States
- Language: English

Wolves is a documentary short film produced for IMAX and released in 1999. The film documents the re-introduction of a pack of wolves to a remote region of Idaho. It was narrated by The Band's Robbie Robertson.
