= Kenneth T. Bird =

American physician and telemedicine pioneer

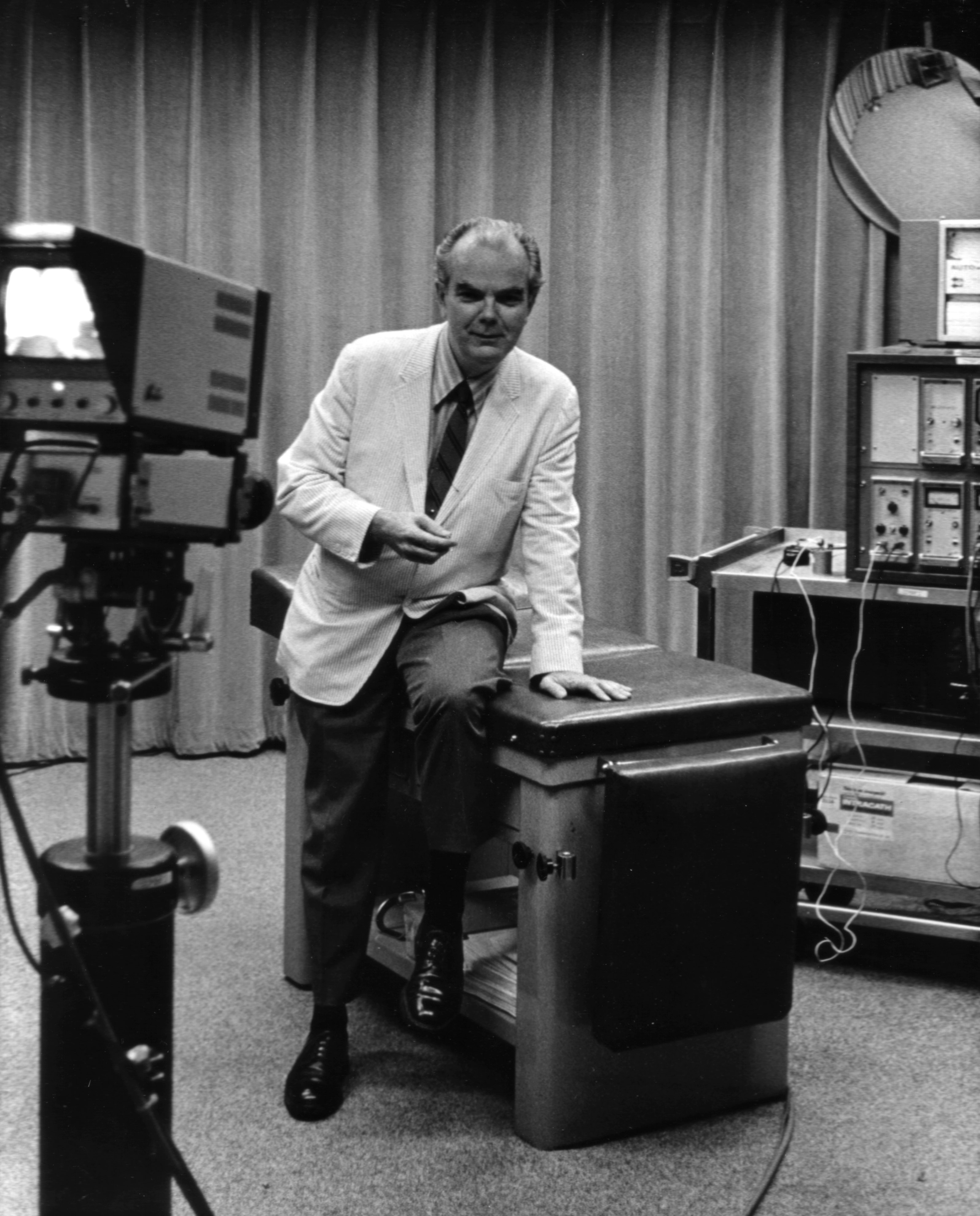
- Born: April 26, 1917
- Died: February 13, 1991 (aged 73)
- Known for: Early development of telemedicine
- Scientific career
- Fields: Pulmonology, telemedicine

Kenneth T. Bird (April 26, 1917 – February 13, 1991) was an American physician, pulmonologist and medical innovator known for his role in the early development of telemedicine. In the late 1960s, he developed one of the first operational telemedicine systems at Massachusetts General Hospital, linking the hospital with the medical station at Logan International Airport using two-way interactive television. His work is frequently cited in historical accounts of telemedicine, and he helped popularize the term.

== Early life and education ==
Bird was born in Watertown, Massachusetts. He graduated from Harvard College in 1938 and received his medical degree from Harvard Medical School in 1943. He later trained in pulmonary medicine and Tuberculosis at Massachusetts General Hospital, the Middlesex County Sanatorium, and Bellevue Hospital.

During the Korean War, Bird served as a captain in the United States Army Medical Corps.

== Career ==
Bird spent much of his career at Massachusetts General Hospital, where he specialized in pulmonary medicine. He also directed the medical station at Logan International Airport, a hospital-administered airport clinic established in the early 1960s.

=== Telemedicine ===
Bird is best known for work in the late 1960s and 1970s developing a two-way audiovisual consultation system linking Massachusetts General Hospital with the Logan Airport medical station. The system used interactive television and microwave transmission to allow hospital physicians to evaluate patients remotely with assistance from on-site clinical staff. The idea originated in part from logistical challenges between the hospital and Logan Airport. According to later accounts, he proposed using two-way television to examine patients remotely. Historical sources describe the project as one of the earliest operational telemedicine systems in the United States. Bird helped popularize the term telemedicine in connection with these efforts.

Bird’s work at Massachusetts General Hospital and Logan Airport was described in contemporary accounts, including Michael Crichton’s Five Patients, which examined hospital practices and emerging medical technologies in the late 1960s. It was featured in Life in 1970, reflecting broader public interest in the use of television for medical diagnosis. Bird’s work also received attention in popular media, including coverage in Reader's Digest in 1968. In historical accounts of telehealth, Bird is identified as an early advocate for the use of telecommunications in clinical care, with a review in The Lancet describing him as a leading spokesman for the practice.

=== Other work ===
In addition to his telemedicine work, Bird was active in pulmonary medicine, tuberculosis treatment, and medical teaching. He held an academic appointment at Harvard Medical School.

== Death ==
Bird died on February 13, 1991, at the age of 73.

== Legacy ==
Bird has been described as a pioneer of telemedicine because of his role in early remote video diagnosis and consultation systems. His work is frequently cited in retrospectives on the history of telehealth in the United States.
