= To the Arctic 3D =

- Directed by: Greg MacGillivray
- Written by: Stephen Judson
- Produced by: Greg MacGillivray; Shaun Macgillivray
- Narrated by: Meryl Streep
- Cinematography: Brad Ohlund
- Edited by: Stephen Judson
- Music by: Paul McCartney; Steve Wood
- Production companies: IMAX Pictures; MacGillivray Freeman Films
- Distributed by: Warner Bros. Pictures
- Release date: April 20, 2012 (United States)
- Running time: 40 minutes
- Country: United States
- Language: English
- Box office: $23.7 million

To the Arctic 3D is a 2012 American IMAX 3D documentary film directed by Greg MacGillivray. It was narrated by Meryl Streep.

== Reception ==
As of December 2020, the film holds a 64% approval rating on review aggregator website Rotten Tomatoes, based on 28 reviews with an average rating of 6.5/10.
