= Tim Weed =

American singer-songwriter (born 1959)

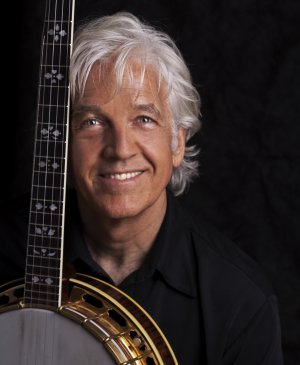

Background information
- Born: Timothy James Wiedenkeller; April 11, 1959 (age 67)
- Origin: Southern California
- Genres: Americana, bluegrass, world music, classical, jazz, rock
- Occupations: Bandleader, singer-songwriter, guitarist, banjoist, composer, music teacher
- Instruments: Banjo, guitar
- Years active: 1978–present
- Website: http://www.timweed.com

Tim Weed (born April 11, 1959) is a multi-instrumentalist singer-songwriter known for virtuosity on the banjo. Raised a Southern California surfer, Weed learned the banjo at age 17 and played professionally at 18. He was in various bands, and he worked as a studio musician singing and playing electric guitar in the Greater Los Angeles Area. He lived in Japan for a time producing records for Sony-Epic, and he lived on the island of Maui where he rediscovered the banjo. Weed settled in Tucson, Arizona, for eight years, playing in local bands. Working with luthier Dennis Coon he designed and built a seven-string hybrid of banjo and guitar called the "Sevan". He released a solo banjo album: Milagros; in mid-2005 the music was featured on NPR. In 2008 Weed moved to Northern California where he released an album of Americana, world music and bluegrass songs: Soul House. In 2020 he released a classical album, Light and Dark, with the Prague Metropolitan Orchestra. Weed plays concerts and festivals, and he teaches banjo privately.

== Early life ==
Timothy James Wiedenkeller was born in Orange, California, on April 11, 1959. His father Ted Wiedenkeller served as a United States Marine Corps fighter pilot also flying twin-engine bombers in the Pacific with VMB-433 during World War II. His mother was a homemaker and teacher. Weed was the fourth of five children born to the family and grew up in Laguna Beach

In school, Weed learned to sing in choir at age six and he learned to play the trumpet at age eight. His immediate family was somewhat musical but his grandfather, Peter Otto Wiedenkeller, was a professional musician who sometimes played flute with the Los Angeles Philharmonic. Peter was born in Vienna in 1894 then immigrated to New York City at the age of four. He was a flautist and piccolo player who served in the United States Army during World War I, became a naturalized U.S. citizen in 1919, and continued to serve as an Army and Marine Corps bandleader. Peter studied under Frank Damrosch at the Institute of Musical Art (later known as the Juilliard School). Weed's grandmother was also a professional musician: she taught music and sang with the Los Angeles Master Chorale.

Weed enjoyed surfing in his teens at Laguna Beach, but he also took notice of banjo parts in popular rock music, for instance the handful of Eagles songs featuring Bernie Leadon on banjo, and the few Poco tunes featuring Rusty Young on banjo. He also enjoyed the song "Dueling Banjos" which was a hit for Eric Weissberg in 1973. Weed acquired recordings of Jerry Garcia playing banjo in the all-star bluegrass group Old & In the Way. Weed was given a $60 banjo on his 17th birthday and he began learning it intensively on his own, initially by using a tape recorder to play back his favorite banjo recordings at half speed. His friend Jeff Harvey practiced with him; Harvey would later focus on mandolin. The two blond-haired surfers took part in jam sessions with local musicians; Weed's first and only banjo lesson came at a jam session in Huntington Beach where luthier Greg Rich taught him to play Larry McNeely's banjo transcription of Benny Goodman's "Slipped Disc" in just half an hour. Rich said that Weed "not only learned how to play it note for note but nailed the speed, timing and technique almost as well as Larry himself."

== Bluegrass banjo ==
Harvey and Weed joined with veteran singer/songwriter/guitarist Ken Orrick to form a band called Last Chance. They played the Golden West Bluegrass Festival in 1977 and began touring the Western United States. In 1978, Stuart Duncan joined the band on fiddle. Regular appearances included performances at Knott's Berry Farm. They were tapped by Cliffie Stone to play his "Hometown Jamboree" at the Shrine Auditorium in Los Angeles. Various other musicians came through the band including Alison Brown on dobro. During this period, Weed was invited to play a variety of vintage banjos, guitars and mandolins from the collections of R. C. "Randy" Snoddy and Mac Yasuda. From this experience he developed a preference for banjos with more sustain for better melodic expression. When Last Chance disbanded, Weed and Harvey backed children's entertainers Janet & Judy Robinson.

== Session player and composer ==
Weed switched to electric guitar in the 1980s and worked as a session musician and high tenor harmony singer for various bands. He backed Greg Leisz, Rosie Flores and Al Perkins, among others. Expanding his musical scope with rock, jazz and fusion, Weed played with Michael Tavera and other Los Angeles-area musicians. In 1983 Weed recorded for the first time one of his original compositions, a large format recording with orchestral backing; all recorded by Allen Sides at Ocean Way Recording. The demo did not bring a recording contract but it helped Weed get further bookings as a studio musician, vocalist, and also as a songwriter and music composer. In 1985 Weed joined with Tavera in a band called Max—they tried to get a record contract but the grueling process proved ultimately unsuccessful.

Burned out on the L.A. music scene, Weed moved to Japan in 1987 to continue his work in music. There, he produced albums for Epic/Sony Records. He toured Southeast Asia and the South Pacific. This experience brought him into contact with world music. He moved back to Southern California and focused on composing music for television and films, especially documentaries. He started a family with his partner, celebrating a son in 1990. Weed moved to the island of Maui in Hawaii in 1993 and co-wrote music for the dance performance work Garden of Be in 1994. He composed orchestral cues for documentary films. The Maui Symphony Orchestra hired him to play banjo in a concert, so he picked up the banjo after 15 years away from the instrument. Weed began to write original banjo music in the classical style, starting with a 25-minute-long concerto. He composed purely by playing the banjo to evoke a feeling, rather than by thinking about technical aspects of music composition, so much so that when he turned to staff paper to score the concerto, he realized he had not even considered what key it was in.

At the end of 1995 Weed moved his family to Southern California where he formed the band Banjambo to explore jazz and eclectic music. This band included drummer Steve DiStanislao, fiddler Craig Eastman, and saxophonist Paul Carman who had toured with Frank Zappa. Weed also played reggae with bassist Ronnie "Stepper" McQueen of Steel Pulse. In 1995 a daughter was born to the family.

== Tucson and Milagros ==
Weed moved his family to Tucson in 1999. He played bluegrass music in a Tucson-based band named Frog Mountain, with fiddler Chris Brashear and flatpicking guitar champion Peter McLaughlin. Weed's original score was featured on the 2004 animated program Davey and Goliath's Snowboard Adventure, a Christmas special. Weed began to write original songs with more of an emotional, personal nature. He performed with McLaughlin as well as with Tucson-based musicians such as fiddler Jesse Stockman, bassist/violinist Rob Paulus, Paulus's wife vocalist Randi Dorman, vocalist Debbie Daly, kalimba player Mark Holdaway, percussionists Todd Hammes and Jeff Friedl, and didgeridoo player Allan Shockley. He backed singer-songwriter Nancy McCallion in 2004 in her first solo album after being in the Mollys folk group. He also recorded and played with Stefan George and Lisa Otey.

Weed's banjo style was not traditional; he did not use the banjo's high, short fifth string as a drone. Instead, he used it chromatically to extend the instrument's range to higher notes. Weed decided to augment the guitar with this same ability, so in 2004 he designed an acoustic/electric/MIDI guitar/banjo solid-body instrument by adding a short seventh-string. This prototype instrument soon broke in an accident, so Weed teamed with luthier Dennis Coon to redesign it as a hollow-bodied acoustic instrument, creating a hybrid they called the "Sevan".

At the end of 2004, Weed produced his first solo album, Milagros (Spanish for "Miracles"). The CD was a collection of original banjo compositions in the style of classical music, except for one of the tracks, "Haiku", which featured the Sevan instead of the banjo. Another track called "Lama" was written in the classical Indian raga style. The first tune on the CD—"Morro Glenn"—was featured in July 2005 on NPR's All Songs Considered, a national radio show by Bob Boilen. On his label Acoustic Oasis, mandolinist and record producer David Grisman released the album as an independently produced offering. Grisman said of Weed that he "can play everything from hardcore bluegrass to Bach. His original banjo music is grounded in many traditions, including Indian classical". In 2005, Weed played for the Dalai Lama in Tucson; he premiered his song "Love and Peace and Happiness" which would end up on his next album. Playing the banjo, Weed recorded with the Dave Matthews Band on the score of the documentary film Grand Canyon Adventure: River at Risk which was released in early 2008.

== Northern California and Soul House ==
While living in Tucson, Weed's relationship with the mother of his children came to an end. Weed met vocalist and yoga instructor Debbie Daly in 2003 and partnered with her. In 2008 Weed and Daly moved from Tucson to Point Reyes Station in rural West Marin County, north of San Francisco near the Pacific Ocean. In the San Francisco Bay Area, Weed became known in the music community as a banjo virtuoso; a "musician's musician". The Point Reyes Light wrote that he "quickly carved a niche as one of the area's best-loved performers, often playing at benefits and community events." He was a featured performer at the first California Banjo Gathering in Sacramento in September 2008, at which Pete Seeger joined by teleconference and expressed appreciation for Weed's original bluegrass song "Long Tom". Weed returned to Tucson in October to headline at the Arizona Folklore Preserve. In a series which included Charlie Tagawa, Weed performed solo banjo at the Summer Jazz Banjo Festival in June 2009, held at Saint Mary's College of California. Weed joined with other musicians to play "Soldier's Joy" at the memorial service for billionaire banjo player Warren Hellman in December 2012. He has played with Grisman, Peter Rowan and Ramblin' Jack Elliott.

In May 2013, Weed was featured on the cover of the Banjo Newsletter, the most prominent magazine for banjo players. In the magazine he was interviewed by Mike Kropp of the bluegrass band Northern Lights. Kropp said after hearing the album Milagros that Weed was "the world's greatest player I'd never heard of."

In October 2013, Weed released his second album: Soul House. The title was inspired by a comment from Welsh ecologist Ianto Evans, known for advocating natural cob houses, who said the house in the Western world is too often a storage place for things, when it should be a vessel to nurture the human spirit. The Soul House album consisted of Weed's original vocal songs and one traditional African song. Weed had been working on the project since 2007. The album evolved for years; it was recorded in eight studios using nine audio engineers. Weed's son Tucker and his daughter Anza are among the 24 musicians appearing on the album. In support of the CD release, Weed played a series of concerts including an appearance at Yoshi's jazz club in Oakland following shows in Point Reyes, Santa Cruz and San Rafael. The nine-piece group appearing in Point Reyes included bassist Sascha Jacobsen of Trio Garufa, mandolinist Dana Rath of the Modern Mandolin Quartet, cellist Myra Joy of the San Francisco Conservatory of Music, veteran bluegrass fiddler Blaine Sprouse, multi-instrumentalist and research scientist Mark Robertson-Tessi, percussionists Tobias Roberson and Steve Brock, and Debbie Daly on vocals and guitar. While practicing, Weed and Jacobsen discovered that their grandfather and great-grandfather had played together in New York: Juilliard violinist Sascha Jacobsen had been a colleague and close friend of flautist Peter Wiedenkeller. At the end of October, Weed was featured on the cover of the Marin Independent Journal, the article describing the CD and his career.

== Light and Dark ==
Weed performed at Stag's Leap Wine Cellars in Napa in 2016, and was approached by listeners who were in the New York Philharmonic. They convinced Weed to compose an orchestral piece with banjo as featured soloist, and Weed ended up collaborating with arranger Stephen Cohn on a new symphonic work, "Colloquium: Dark & Light". During this time, Weed was also working with his nonprofit group Sound Orchard dedicated to building community through music, and he teamed with his violinist colleague Sascha Jacobsen to orchestrate Weed's earlier suite "Morro Glenn" for orchestra.

In 2019, Weed and his partner Elizabeth "Liebe" Patterson traveled to the Czech Republic to record "Colloquium: Dark & Light" and "Morro Glenn" with the Prague Metropolitan Orchestra at SONO Records. Patterson served as musical director during the recording and mixing. Weed announced in August 2020 that he would release his third album, containing two concertos for banjo and orchestra, Light and Dark, the following month.
