= Melvin B. Zisfein =

American aircraft designer

Melvin B. Zisfein (1926–1995) was an aircraft designer and a Deputy Director of the U.S. National Air and Space Museum in Washington, DC.

Zisfein graduated from the Massachusetts Institute of Technology with degrees in aeronautical engineering (B.S. 1948; M.S. 1948) and worked as a designer, aerodynamicist, and manager for aircraft companies from then until 1966. He was associate director of the Franklin Institute Research Laboratories from 1966 to 1971. From 1971 to 1982 he served as the deputy director of the National Air and Space Museum, and was the acting director in 1978.

Zisfein published a book, Flight: A Panorama of Aviation in 1981, and a number of other books and professional publications. Some of his papers are kept at the Smithsonian Institution Archives.
