= Greg MacGillivray =

Film director and cinematographer

- Born: 1945 (age 80–81)
- Occupations: Documentary film director and cinematographer

Greg MacGillivray (born 1945) is an American film director and cinematographer.

== Career ==
MacGillivray was first nominated for an Academy Award in 1995 for directing The Living Sea (Best Documentary Short Subject), and was nominated in the same category again for Dolphins in 2000.

He initiated the development of three cameras for the IMAX format, the high-speed (slow-motion) camera, the industry's first lightweight camera, and the "all-weather" camera used during filming on Mount Everest.

In August 2005, MacGillivray was producing a documentary which examined the potential effects of a hurricane hitting New Orleans. By the end of the month, Hurricane Katrina struck Louisiana and MacGillivray filmed the events rather than creating a hurricane simulation as originally planned.

MacGillivray, with partner Jim Freeman, founded MacGillivray Freeman Films. Freeman was killed in a Sierra Nevada helicopter crash in 1976. MacGillivray keeps his partner's name as a memorial.

== Personal life ==
MacGillivray and his wife, Barbara, have two children and reside in Laguna Beach, California.

== Selected filmography ==
- Out Where The West Begins (2021)
- Dream Big: Engineering Our World (2017)
- To the Arctic 3D (2012)
- Hollywood Don't Surf! (2010)
- Grand Canyon Adventure: River at Risk (2008)
- The Alps (2007)
- Hurricane on the Bayou (2006)
- Greece: Secrets of the Past (2006)
- Coral Reef Adventure (2003)
- Adventures in Wild California (2000)
- Dolphins (2000)
- Everest (1998)
- The Living Sea (1995)
- Beautiful Indonesia (1994)
- Speed (1984)
- The Shining (1980)
- To Fly! (1976)
- Magic Rolling Board (1976), 10-minute skateboard documentary
- The Sunshine Sea (1973)
- Five Summer Stories (1972)
