= Giant Screen Cinema Association =

International trade association for giant screen cinema

- Abbreviation: GSCA
- Formation: 2006
- Type: Trade association
- Website: https://www.giantscreencinema.com/

The Giant Screen Cinema Association (GSCA) is an international trade organization representing theaters, filmmakers, distributors, and technology providers involved in the giant screen cinema industry. The organization supports the production, distribution, and exhibition of large-format films and facilitates collaboration across the global giant screen community.

== History ==
The Giant Screen Cinema Association was established in 2006 as a successor to earlier industry organizations supporting large-format film exhibition. It was created to provide a unified international body representing stakeholders in the giant screen film industry.

== Mission and activities ==
GSCA’s mission is to connect international exhibitors, filmmakers, and technology providers.

The organization hosts conferences, film expos, and professional development initiatives focused on advancements in large-format film production and exhibition. Its activities include facilitating collaboration across the industry and supporting the adoption of emerging technologies in giant screen cinema.

== Conferences and events ==
The Giant Screen Cinema Association organizes annual conferences and film expos for professionals in the giant screen cinema industry.

Year	Event	Location	Notes
2006	March Conference	Los Angeles, California, United States	March 29–31; inaugural GSCA conference
2006	Conference	Galveston, Texas, United States	September 18–20
2007	Film Expo	Los Angeles, California, United States	April 24–25
2007	Conference	Vancouver, British Columbia, Canada	September 23–25
2008	Film Expo	London, United Kingdom	March 3–5
2008	Conference	Jersey City, New Jersey / New York, NY, United States	September 9–12; Lifelong Learning Symposium included
2009	Film Expo	Los Angeles, California, United States	March 17–18; hosted at the IMAX Theatre at the Bridge; hotel: Marina del Rey Marriott
2009	International Conference	Indianapolis, Indiana, and Cincinnati, Ohio, United States	September 21–23; hosted at the IMAX Theater at the Indiana State Museum; hotel: Hyatt Regency; Dome Day held September 24 at Cincinnati Museum Center, Cincinnati, Ohio
2010	Film Expo	Los Angeles, California, United States	
2010	Conference	Chattanooga, Tennessee and Birmingham, Alabama, United States	
2011	Film Expo	Los Angeles, California, United States	
2011	Conference	Austin, Texas, and Fort Worth, Texas, United States	
2012	Film Expo	Los Angeles, California, United States	
2012	Conference	Sacramento, California, and San Jose, California, United States	
2013	Film Expo	Los Angeles, California, United States	
2013	Conference	Ottawa, Ontario, Canada	
2014	Film Expo	Los Angeles, California, United States	
2014	Conference	Toronto, Ontario, Canada	
2015	Film Expo	Los Angeles, California, United States	
2015	Conference	San Francisco, California, and San Jose, California, United States	
2016	Film Expo	Los Angeles, California, United States	
2016	Conference	Toronto, Ontario, Canada	
2017	Film Expo	Los Angeles, California, United States	
2017	Conference	Chicago, Illinois, United States	
2018	Film Expo	Los Angeles, California, United States	
2018	Conference	Las Vegas, Nevada, United States	
2019	Film Expo	Los Angeles, California, United States	
2019	Conference	Tucson, Arizona, United States	
2020	—	—	Events impacted by COVID-19 pandemic
2021	Virtual Film Expo	Online	April 12–30
2021	Virtual Conference	Online	September 13–October 1
2022	Film Expo	Los Angeles, California, United States	
2022	Conference	Chattanooga, Tennessee, United States	Dome Day in Birmingham, Alabama
2023	Film Expo	Los Angeles, California, United States	March 14–15
2023	Conference	Cincinnati, Ohio / Indianapolis, Indiana, United States	
2024	Film Expo	Los Angeles, California, United States	March 11–12
2024	Conference	Birmingham, Alabama / Chattanooga, Tennessee, United States	
2025	Film Expo	Los Angeles, California, United States	March 10–12; AMC CityWalk IMAX Theatre
2025	Conference	Austin, Texas / Fort Worth, Texas, United States	September 16–20; Bullock Museum & Fort Worth Museum of Science and History

== Awards ==
The Giant Screen Cinema Association presents annual awards recognizing excellence in giant screen filmmaking, exhibition, and related fields. The awards are presented at the GSCA International Conference.

The GSCA Achievement Awards recognize excellence across categories including film production, cinematography, sound design, visual effects, and marketing.

Awards are determined through voting by GSCA member organizations, reflecting peer recognition within the giant screen industry.

=== Notable winners ===
Selected recipients of GSCA Achievement Awards include major giant screen productions and filmmakers:

- Rocky Mountain Express (2011), which won GSCA awards including Best Film and Best Cinematography.
- Flight of the Butterflies (2012), which received multiple awards including Best Film and Best Cinematography.
- Arctic: Our Frozen Planet (2023), which received multiple GSCA awards including Best Cinematography, Best Sound Design, and Best Original Score.
- Avatar: The Way of Water (IMAX 3D version), which received the GSCA award for Best Feature-Length Film.

In addition, GSCA has presented Outstanding Achievement Awards recognizing significant contributions to the giant screen industry. Recipients have included IMAX co-founder Graeme Ferguson, as well as industry leaders such as Greg MacGillivray and Patricia and David Keighley.

== See also ==
- Large-format film
- IMAX
