= The Living Sea =

- Directed by: Greg MacGillivray
- Written by: Roger Holzberg; Tim Cahill
- Narrated by: Meryl Streep
- Cinematography: Howard Hall
- Edited by: Stephen Judson
- Music by: Sting
- Distributed by: MacGillivray Freeman Films
- Release date: 1995
- Running time: 40 minutes
- Country: United States
- Language: English

The Living Sea is a 70mm American documentary film exploring marine locales intended to show the importance of protecting the ocean, released to IMAX theaters in 1995. It is narrated by actress Meryl Streep, with music by Sting, produced by Science World, a Vancouver-based science education centre, and underwater imagery directed by filmmaker Greg MacGillivray.

== Overview ==
The film is a survey of the world's oceans, emphasizing that it is a single interconnected ocean and the dependence of all life on the planet. The film shows researchers tracking whales, a Coast Guard rough-weather rescue squad, a deep-ocean research team, and the Palau Islands, which contain an unusual jellyfish habitat.

The film is directed by Academy Award-nominated IMAX director and cinematographer Greg MacGillivray, who also directed similar water-conservation themed documentaries such as Grand Canyon Adventure: River at Risk. The film was nominated for an Academy Award for Best Documentary Short but lost to One Survivor Remembers.

== Soundtrack ==
- The Living Sea: Soundtrack from the IMAX Film
- List of highest-grossing documentary films
