= Dolphins (2000 film) =

- Directed by: Greg MacGillivray
- Written by: Tim Cahill; Stephen Judson
- Narrated by: Pierce Brosnan
- Cinematography: Greg MacGillivray; Brad Ohlund
- Edited by: Stephen Judson
- Music by: Sting
- Distributed by: MacGillivray Freeman Films
- Release date: April 14, 2000
- Running time: 39 min.
- Country: United States
- Language: English

Dolphins is an IMAX documentary produced in 2000. The film was nominated for an Academy Award for Best Documentary Short Subject. Directed by Greg MacGillivray, with Chris Palmer serving as executive producer, this feature follows a few scientists studying dolphins (chiefly Kathleen Dudzinski, Dean Bernal, and Alejandro Acevedo-Gutiérrez, as well as Louis Herman and Bernd Wursig) as they work to learn more about dolphins. The main focus is on research into dolphin communication and intelligence, along with some exploration of feeding habits and human interaction. Several species of dolphins are shown, primarily the bottlenose dolphin, the dusky dolphin, and the Atlantic spotted dolphin. Dolphins is narrated by Pierce Brosnan with music by Sting.

== Awards and nominations ==
Incomplete list of awards for Dolphins
Year	Award	Category	Result
2000	73rd Academy Awards	Best Documentary Short Subject	Nominated

== Soundtrack ==
=== Track listing ===
No.	Title	Writer(s)	Performer	Length
1.	"I Need You Like This Hole in My Head"	Sting	Sting	2:51
2.	"Sea of Light"	Sting / Steve Wood	Steve Wood	4:21
3.	"Fill Her Up"	Sting	Sting	5:36
4.	"When Dolphins Dance"	Sting	Steve Wood	5:21
5.	"Ghost Story"	Sting	Sting	5:28
6.	"First Dive"	Sting / Steve Wood	Steve Wood	6:18
7.	"Bubble Rings"	Sting / Steve Wood	Steve Wood	5:17
8.	"When We Dance"	Sting	Sting	5:47
9.	"On the Island"	Steve Wood	Steve Wood	3:16
10.	"Dolphins of the World"	Steve Wood	Steve Wood	5:12
11.	"Rendezvous"	Sting	Steve Wood	5:06

== See also ==
- List of highest-grossing documentary films
- List of documentary films
- List of American films of 2000
