= MacGillivray Freeman Films =

American film production company

- Industry: Film
- Founded: 1963 in Laguna Beach, California, USA
- Founders: Greg MacGillivray and Jim Freeman
- Headquarters: Laguna Beach, CA, United States of America
- Areas served: Worldwide
- Key people: Greg MacGillivray (Chair, Founder, Director) Shaun MacGillivray (President, Producer, Director) Meghan MacGillivray (Vice President) Barbara MacGillivray (Director of Research)
- Products: Motion Pictures
- Website: https://macgillivrayfreeman.com

MacGillivray Freeman Films is an American film production company specializing in large-format, immersive, and educational cinematic experiences for global audiences. The company is led by Shaun MacGillivray, who serves as president, executive producer, and director. MacGillivray Freeman Films collaborates with a wide range of partners—including major brands, museums, tourism boards, non-profit organizations, NGOs, foundations, and associations—to produce films and media projects across a variety of scales and budgets. In addition to filmmaking, the company develops and implements large-scale public outreach and educational initiatives designed to extend the impact of its work beyond the screen.

== History ==
MacGillivray Freeman Films was established in 1963 in Laguna Beach, California, by Greg MacGillivray and Jim Freeman. Greg MacGillivray began making films when he was 13 and later partnered with his best friend, Jim Freeman, to form MacGillivray Freeman Films. In 1966, at the age of 19, the two dropped out of college to make movies full time starting with a film in South America after the success of one of their first surfing documentaries, Free and Easy, which recouped its production costs after only 10 screenings.

In the ensuing years, MacGillivray and Freeman produced a series of documentaries about surfing and skateboarding, pioneering a cinematic perspective for the genre by putting the viewer in the middle of the action via board-mounted cameras.

MacGillivray has produced and directed more than 50 films, 40 of which are IMAX, and has developed three IMAX cameras: a high-speed (slow-motion) model, a lightweight model and the “all-weather” camera he used while filming on Mt. Everest.

== Films ==
=== Documentaries and other films ===
MacGillivray Freeman Films is best known for producing large-format and documentary films that explore science, nature, culture, engineering, and human achievement. The company has released numerous IMAX® and giant-screen films exhibited in museums, science centers, and theaters worldwide, often combining cinematic storytelling with educational objectives. Its productions frequently involve collaborations with scientists, engineers, educators, and cultural institutions, and are accompanied by educational materials and outreach programs designed to engage students and lifelong learners. Through its documentaries and films, MacGillivray Freeman Films aims to make complex subjects accessible to broad audiences while emphasizing immersive visual experiences.

=== IMAX films ===
Most well known for its IMAX films, the studio has produced and distributed 40 IMAX films since 1974. Its first IMAX film, To Fly!, produced for the Smithsonian Institution National Air and Space Museum, was later selected by the Library of Congress for inclusion in the National Film Registry.

Two of its films, Dolphins (2000) and The Living Sea (1995), were nominated for Academy Awards. Its film Everest (1998) appeared on Variety's Top 10 Box Office chart for North America.

The company's films have received nominations and awards from the Giant Screen Cinema Association (GSCA).

=== Filmography ===
Below is a list of films and television commercials produced and/or distributed by MacGillivray Freeman Films.

Title	Release date	Runtime	Format	Notes
Let There Be Surf	1963	n/a	16 mm	Jim Freeman's first commercial film.
Outside the Third Dimension	1964	n/a	16 mm	Produced and directed by Jim Freeman. A film about Hawaiian surfing photographed and released in 3D.
A Cool Wave of Summer	1964	1 hr 17 minutes	16 mm	Greg MacGillivray's first commercial film. An avant-garde film about surfing in California.
The Glass Wall	1965	n/a	16 mm	Produced and distributed by Jim Freeman.
The Performers	1965	n/a	35 mm	Produced and directed by Greg MacGillivray. A study of three Californians who find surf and adventure in Hawaii, Mexico and Florida.
Moods of Surfing	1968	15 minutes	35 mm	Short Film for Theatrical Release by United Artists.
Television Commercials	1969	n/a	n/a	LTV Corporation; Global Van Lines; Oldsmobile
Catch the Joy	1969	15 minutes	35 mm	An aesthetic look at the sport of Dune Buggy-ing by United Artists.
Waves of Change	1969	n/a	35 mm	
Television Commercials	1970	n/a	n/a	Holiday Inns of America; Frosty Root Beer; Carnation
Sentinels of Silence	1970	28 minutes	35 mm	Narrated by Orson Welles. Photographed by Jim Freeman.
Ski Movie One	1970	n/a	n/a	Produced with Summit Films
Five Summer Stories	1972	n/a	n/a	
To Fly!	1976	27 minutes	70 mm	The premiere film for the Theater of the National Air and Space Museum, Smithsonian Institution
The Living Sea	1995	40 minutes	70 mm	
Everest	1998	45 minutes	70 mm	Highest-grossing IMAX film
Dolphins	2000	39 minutes	70 mm	
Grand Canyon Adventure: River at Risk	2008	44 minutes	70 mm	A journey down the Colorado River on a two-week expedition to highlight water conservation issues.
Arabia	2011	39 minutes	70 mm	Arabia takes viewers deep into the heart of an extraordinary country for a surprising look at the history, culture and religion of the Arabian Peninsula.
To The Arctic	2012	40 minutes	70 mm	A close up look at Arctic wildlife
Journey to the South Pacific	2013	40 minutes	70 mm	A film about marine conservation in Indonesia
Humpback Whales	2015	40 minutes	70 mm	A film about the resurgence of Humpback whales
National Parks Adventure	2016	43 minutes	70 mm	A celebration of the 100-year anniversary of the US National Park Service
Dream Big: Engineering Our World	2017	42 minutes	70 mm	Pioneers of engineering and man-made wonders
We, The Marines	2017	37 minutes	70 mm	Large format documentary made for permanent exhibit at the National Museum of the Marine Corps
America's Musical Journey	2018	40 minutes	70 mm	Exploring the roots of America's music
Into Americas Wild	2020	40 minute	70mm	An unforgettable cross-country adventure into the hidden wonders of the natural world
Out Where The West Begins	2021	40 minutes	70 mm	Four-episode documentary series explaining the history of the Western United States
Ireland	2022	43 minutes	70 mm	Journey to a magical land of stunning natural wonders, ancient clifftop marvels, and a rich, cultural heritage.
Sea World Abu Dhabi, One Ocean	2023	90 minutes	360 degree	Theme park visual attraction
Cities of the Future	2024	40 minute	Large format IMAX Film	Imagine stepping 50 years into the future and finding smart cities designed to be totally sustainable.
Superhuman Body	2024	40 minute	Large format IMAX Film	Superhuman Body: World of Medical Marvels takes audiences inside the wonders of the human body and the incredible breakthroughs in science and bioengineering that are changing the course of human health.
Ohio: Wild at Heart	2025	40 minutes	70 mm	Produced for the Ohio Department of Natural Resources

== Conservation ==
=== MacGillivray Freeman Films Educational Foundation ===
In 2004, Greg MacGillivray and his wife Barbara founded the non-profit MacGillivray Freeman Films Educational Foundation to contribute to the conservation of the world's natural and cultural heritage through giant screen films and companion educational programming.

=== One World One Ocean Campaign ===
MacGillivray Freeman established the One World One Ocean campaign, with Managing Director and Producer Shaun MacGillivray since 2012, which, along with other organizations, was featured in Laguna Beach Eco Heroes, a 30-minute documentary by The My Hero Project. The efforts of the Crystal Cove Alliance, ECO Warrior, Laguna Bluebelt, Laguna Canyon Foundation, Nancy Caruso, Pacific Marine Mammal Center, Wyland, and Zero Trash Laguna were also highlighted in the documentary.
