= List of Sony Pictures Classics films =

Sony Pictures Classics (also known as Sony Classics or SPC) is an American film production and distribution company that is a division of Sony Pictures. It was founded in 1992 by former Orion Classics heads Michael Barker, Tom Bernard and Marcie Bloom. It distributes, produces and acquires specialty films such as documentaries, independent and arthouse films in the United States and internationally. As of 2015, Barker and Bernard are co-presidents of the division.

This article lists films which have been produced, distributed and/or co-distributed by Sony Pictures Classics as well as upcoming releases.

== 1990s ==
| Release date | Title | Market(s) | Notes |
|---|---|---|---|
| March 13, 1992 | Howards End | U.S. | currently owned by Cohen Film Group; BAFTA Award for Best Film; National Board of Review Award for Best Film; Nominated - Academy Award for Best Picture; Nominated - Golden Globe Award for Best Motion Picture - Drama; Nominated - César Award for Best Foreign Film; Nominated - David di Donatello for Best Foreign Film; Nominated - Independent Spirit Award for Best International Film; Nominated - Producers Guild of America Award for Best Theatrical Motion Picture |
| September 25, 1992 | Danzón | U.S. | |
| October 30, 1992 | Van Gogh | U.S. | currently owned by Cohen Media Group; Nominated - César Award for Best Film; French entry for the Academy Award for Best Foreign Language Film |
| December 23, 1992 | Indochine | U.S. | Academy Award for Best Foreign Language Film; Golden Globe Award for Best Foreign Language Film; Goya Award for Best European Film; National Board of Review Award for Best Foreign Language Film; Nominated - BAFTA Award for Best Film Not in the English Language; Nominated - César Award for Best Film |
| March 3, 1993 | Olivier, Olivier | U.S. and Canada | |
| April 16, 1993 | The Story of Qiu Ju | U.S. and Canada | Golden Lion; Nominated - Independent Spirit Award for Best International Film; Chinese entry for the Academy Award for Best Foreign Language Film |
| May 28, 1993 | The Long Day Closes | U.S. | owned by Film4 Productions; Nominated - Palme d'Or |
| June 9, 1993 | Orlando | U.S. and Canada | Nominated - Independent Spirit Award for Best International Film |
| June 25, 1993 | Jacquot de Nantes | U.S. | |
| August 6, 1993 | House of Angels | U.S. | |
| December 21, 1993 | Faraway, So Close! | North and South America, the U.K. and Ireland | International rights currently licensed to HanWay Films, with U.K. and Irish rights sub-licensed to Curzon Film; Grand Prix (Cannes Film Festival); Nominated - Palme d'Or |
| December 23, 1993 | The Accompanist | U.S. | |
| February 25, 1994 | Belle Époque | U.S. | Academy Award for Best Foreign Language Film; Goya Award for Best Film; Nominated - BAFTA Award for Best Film Not in the English Language |
| March 31, 1994 | Germinal | U.S. | Nominated - César Award for Best Film; French entry for the Academy Award for Best Foreign Language Film |
| April 15, 1994 | In Custody | U.S. | currently owned by Cohen Media Group |
| June 3, 1994 | The Slingshot | Worldwide excluding Scandinavia | Swedish entry for the Academy Award for Best Foreign Language Film |
| July 15, 1994 | Mi Vida Loca | U.S. and Canada | |
| October 19, 1994 | Vanya on 42nd Street | U.S., Australia, New Zealand and Japan | |
| October 21, 1994 | I Don't Want to Talk About It | U.S. and Canada | |
| December 22, 1994 | A Man of No Importance | U.S. and Canada | |
| February 17, 1995 | Window to Paris | U.S. and Canada | |
| March 8, 1995 | Martha & Ethel | U.S., Canada, the U.K., Ireland, Australia and New Zealand | |
| March 17, 1995 | Farinelli | U.S. and Canada | currently owned by Film Movement; Golden Globe Award for Best Foreign Language Film; Nominated - Academy Award for Best Foreign Language Film |
| April 21, 1995 | Burnt by the Sun | U.S. | Academy Award for Best Foreign Language Film; Grand Prix (Cannes Film Festival); Nominated - BAFTA Award for Best Film Not in the English Language; Nominated - David di Donatello for Best Foreign Film; Nominated - Palme d'Or |
| April 21, 1995 | Pather Panchali | U.S. | Owned by the National Film Development Corporation of India (Pather Panchali, Aparajito, and Jalsaghar), Chhayabani Private Limited (Apur Sansar and Devi), and RDB Entertainments (Charulata and The Big City), with U.S. distribution rights currently licensed to Janus Films and The Criterion Collection re-released as part of the retrospective The Masterworks of Satyajit Ray co-distributed by Merchant Ivory Productions |
| April 21, 1995 | Aparajito | U.S. | Owned by the National Film Development Corporation of India (Pather Panchali, Aparajito, and Jalsaghar), Chhayabani Private Limited (Apur Sansar and Devi), and RDB Entertainments (Charulata and The Big City), with U.S. distribution rights currently licensed to Janus Films and The Criterion Collection re-released as part of the retrospective The Masterworks of Satyajit Ray co-distributed by Merchant Ivory Productions |
| April 21, 1995 | The World of Apu | U.S. | Owned by the National Film Development Corporation of India (Pather Panchali, Aparajito, and Jalsaghar), Chhayabani Private Limited (Apur Sansar and Devi), and RDB Entertainments (Charulata and The Big City), with U.S. distribution rights currently licensed to Janus Films and The Criterion Collection re-released as part of the retrospective The Masterworks of Satyajit Ray co-distributed by Merchant Ivory Productions |
| April 21, 1995 | Jalsaghar | U.S. | Owned by the National Film Development Corporation of India (Pather Panchali, Aparajito, and Jalsaghar), Chhayabani Private Limited (Apur Sansar and Devi), and RDB Entertainments (Charulata and The Big City), with U.S. distribution rights currently licensed to Janus Films and The Criterion Collection re-released as part of the retrospective The Masterworks of Satyajit Ray co-distributed by Merchant Ivory Productions |
| April 21, 1995 | Charulata | U.S. | Owned by the National Film Development Corporation of India (Pather Panchali, Aparajito, and Jalsaghar), Chhayabani Private Limited (Apur Sansar and Devi), and RDB Entertainments (Charulata and The Big City), with U.S. distribution rights currently licensed to Janus Films and The Criterion Collection re-released as part of the retrospective The Masterworks of Satyajit Ray co-distributed by Merchant Ivory Productions |
| April 21, 1995 | Two Daughters | U.S. | Owned by the National Film Development Corporation of India (Pather Panchali, Aparajito, and Jalsaghar), Chhayabani Private Limited (Apur Sansar and Devi), and RDB Entertainments (Charulata and The Big City), with U.S. distribution rights currently licensed to Janus Films and The Criterion Collection re-released as part of the retrospective The Masterworks of Satyajit Ray co-distributed by Merchant Ivory Productions |
| April 21, 1995 | Devi | U.S. | Owned by the National Film Development Corporation of India (Pather Panchali, Aparajito, and Jalsaghar), Chhayabani Private Limited (Apur Sansar and Devi), and RDB Entertainments (Charulata and The Big City), with U.S. distribution rights currently licensed to Janus Films and The Criterion Collection re-released as part of the retrospective The Masterworks of Satyajit Ray co-distributed by Merchant Ivory Productions |
| April 21, 1995 | The Big City | U.S. | Owned by the National Film Development Corporation of India (Pather Panchali, Aparajito, and Jalsaghar), Chhayabani Private Limited (Apur Sansar and Devi), and RDB Entertainments (Charulata and The Big City), with U.S. distribution rights currently licensed to Janus Films and The Criterion Collection re-released as part of the retrospective The Masterworks of Satyajit Ray co-distributed by Merchant Ivory Productions |
| April 21, 1995 | The Middleman | U.S. | Owned by the National Film Development Corporation of India (Pather Panchali, Aparajito, and Jalsaghar), Chhayabani Private Limited (Apur Sansar and Devi), and RDB Entertainments (Charulata and The Big City), with U.S. distribution rights currently licensed to Janus Films and The Criterion Collection re-released as part of the retrospective The Masterworks of Satyajit Ray co-distributed by Merchant Ivory Productions |
| April 28, 1995 | Crumb | U.S. and Canada | National Board of Review Award for Best Documentary Film |
| May 19, 1995 | Amateur | U.S. | |
| May 26, 1995 | A Pure Formality | U.S. | |
| June 8, 1995 | Anne Frank Remembered | U.S. | Academy Award for Best Documentary Feature; International Emmy Award for Best Documentary |
| June 16, 1995 | Wings of Courage | Worldwide | |
| June 23, 1995 | Love & Human Remains | U.S. | |
| June 30, 1995 | Safe | U.S. and Canada | Sony has since acquired rights in additional territories including India; Nominated - Independent Spirit Award for Best Film |
| July 21, 1995 | Living in Oblivion | U.S. and Canada | Nominated - Independent Spirit Award for Best Film |
| September 15, 1995 | Mute Witness | Worldwide | currently owned by Jinga Films under the Vintage label; select distribution rights including the US owned by Arrow Films and Shudder; Nominated - Saturn Award for Best Horror Film |
| September 27, 1995 | Persuasion | North and Latin America, Spain and Japan | |
| October 20, 1995 | Across the Sea of Time | Worldwide | |
| December 15, 1995 | The City of Lost Children | U.S. | Nominated - Independent Spirit Award for Best Foreign Film; Nominated - Saturn Award for Best Horror Film |
| December 22, 1995 | Shanghai Triad | U.S. and Canada | currently owned by StudioCanal, with U.S. distribution rights currently licensed to Film Movement; National Board of Review Award for Best Foreign Language Film; Nominated - Golden Globe Award for Best Foreign Language Film |
| January 24, 1996 | Caught | Worldwide | |
| February 16, 1996 | A Midwinter's Tale | North and Latin America, Australia, New Zealand and Asia excluding Japan | distribution only; produced by Castle Rock Entertainment |
| March 8, 1996 | The Flower of My Secret | U.S. and Canada | Spanish entry for the Academy Award for Best Foreign Language Film |
| March 15, 1996 | The Celluloid Closet | U.S. and Canada | |
| March 29, 1996 | Denise Calls Up | U.S. | Sony has since acquired rights in additional territories including Canada, the U.K., Ireland, France, Germany, Austria, Spain, Italy, Eastern Europe, South Africa, the Middle East, Turkey, Israel, the Benelux, Greece, Cyprus, Portugal and India |
| May 3, 1996 | Madame Butterfly | U.S., Canada, Germany and Austria | |
| May 24, 1996 | Welcome to the Dollhouse | U.S and Canada | Grand Jury Prize Dramatic; Nominated - Independent Spirit Award for Best Film |
| June 21, 1996 | Lone Star | North and Latin America, the Benelux, Australia, New Zealand and Asia excluding Japan | Nominated - Independent Spirit Award for Best Film; distribution only; produced by Castle Rock Entertainment; currently owned by Warner Bros. Pictures |
| July 26, 1996 | Manny & Lo | U.S. and Canada | |
| September 13, 1996 | Brother of Sleep | U.S. and Canada | Nominated - Golden Globe Award for Best Foreign Language Film; German entry for the Academy Award for Best Foreign Language Film |
| October 9, 1996 | Beautiful Thing | U.S. and Canada | |
| November 8, 1996 | The Garden of the Finzi-Continis | U.S. and Canada | currently owned by Lionsgate; Academy Award for Best Foreign Language Film; David di Donatello for Best Film; Golden Bear; 25th anniversary re-release; originally distributed by Cinema 5 |
| December 20, 1996 | The Whole Wide World | U.S., Canada, Australia and New Zealand | |
| December 25, 1996 | Thieves | U.S. and Canada | Nominated - César Award for Best Film |
| January 31, 1997 | Waiting for Guffman | U.S. and Canada theatrical, Latin America, Australia, New Zealand and Asia excluding Japan | Nominated - Independent Spirit Award for Best Film distribution only; produced by Castle Rock Entertainment; currently owned by Warner Bros. Pictures |
| February 7, 1997 | SubUrbia | U.S. and Canada theatrical, Latin America, Australia, New Zealand and Asia excluding Japan | distribution only; produced by Castle Rock Entertainment; currently owned by Warner Bros. Pictures |
| April 23, 1997 | A Chef in Love | U.S. and English-speaking Canada | Nominated - Academy Award for Best Foreign Language Film |
| May 2, 1997 | Broken English | U.S. and Canada | |
| June 20, 1997 | Dream with the Fishes | U.S., Canada, the U.K. and Ireland | |
| June 20, 1997 | When the Cat's Away | U.S. | |
| July 11, 1997 | Thrill Ride: The Science of Fun | Worldwide | |
| August 1, 1997 | In the Company of Men | U.S. and Canada | |
| September 17, 1997 | The Myth of Fingerprints | Worldwide | |
| October 3, 1997 | Fast, Cheap & Out of Control | U.S. and select international territories including Canada, the U.K., Ireland, Australia and New Zealand | National Board of Review Award for Best Documentary Film |
| November 14, 1997 | The Tango Lesson | U.S., Canada and Mexico | Nominated - BAFTA Award for Best Film Not in the English Language |
| December 26, 1997 | Afterglow | U.S., Canada, the U.K. and Ireland | |
| December 26, 1997 | Ma vie en rose | U.S., Canada, Australia, New Zealand and Scandinavia | Golden Globe Award for Best Foreign Language Film; Nominated - BAFTA Award for Best Film Not in the English Language; Belgian entry for the Academy Award for Best Foreign Language Film |
| February 6, 1998 | Nil by Mouth | North and South America, Spain, Australia and New Zealand | BAFTA Award for Outstanding British Film; Nominated - BIFA for Best British Independent Film |
| March 27, 1998 | Character | U.S. | Academy Award for Best Foreign Language Film |
| March 27, 1998 | Men with Guns | North and South America, the U.K. and Ireland | Nominated - Golden Globe Award for Best Foreign Language Film; Nominated - BIFA for Best Foreign Independent Film |
| April 3, 1998 | The Spanish Prisoner | U.S. and Canada | |
| May 1, 1998 | A Friend of the Deceased | U.S. and Canada | |
| May 1, 1998 | Wilde | U.S. and Canada | |
| May 22, 1998 | The Opposite of Sex | Worldwide | distribution only; produced by Rysher Entertainment |
| June 19, 1998 | Henry Fool | U.S., Canada, the U.K. and Ireland | currently owned by Possible Films |
| June 19, 1998 | Marie from the Bay of Angels | U.S. and Canada | |
| July 2, 1998 | Mark Twain's America | Worldwide | |
| July 10, 1998 | Whatever | Worldwide | |
| July 31, 1998 | The Governess | North and Latin America, Spain, Australia and New Zealand | Sony has since acquired rights in additional territories including India |
| November 13, 1998 | Dancing at Lughnasa | U.S. and Canada | |
| November 20, 1998 | Central Station | U.S. and English-speaking Canada | BAFTA Award for Best Film Not in the English Language; Golden Bear; Golden Globe Award for Best Foreign Language Film; National Board of Review Award for Best Foreign Language Film; Nominated - Academy Award for Best Foreign Language Film; Nominated - César Award for Best Foreign Film; Nominated - David di Donatello for Best Foreign Film; Nominated - Independent Spirit Award for Best International Film; Nominated - Satellite Award for Best Foreign Language Film |
| December 18, 1998 | The General | U.S., Canada, Australia and New Zealand | Nominated - Independent Spirit Award for Best International Film; Nominated - Satellite Award for Best Film |
| February 12, 1999 | Tango | U.S. and Canada | Nominated - Academy Award for Best Foreign Language Film; Nominated - Golden Globe Award for Best Foreign Language Film |
| April 2, 1999 | The Dreamlife of Angels | U.S. and English-speaking Canada | César Award for Best Film; Nominated - BIFA for Best Foreign Independent Film; Nominated - European Film Award for Best Film; French entry for the Academy Award for Best Foreign Language Film |
| April 16, 1999 | SLC Punk | U.S., Canada, the U.K. and Ireland | |
| April 16, 1999 | The Winslow Boy | Worldwide | |
| May 7, 1999 | This Is My Father | U.S. and Canada | |
| May 28, 1999 | The Loss of Sexual Innocence | North and Latin America, the U.K., Ireland, Australia and New Zealand | |
| June 18, 1999 | Run Lola Run | North and Latin America, the U.K., Ireland, Australia and New Zealand | German Film Award for Best Fiction Film; Independent Spirit Award for Best International Film; Nominated - BAFTA Award for Best Film Not in the English Language |
| July 30, 1999 | Twin Falls Idaho | U.S., Canada, Australia and New Zealand | |
| October 22, 1999 | One Day in September | U.S. and Canada | currently owned by Metro-Goldwyn-Mayer and Multicom Entertainment Group; Academy Award for Best Documentary Feature; Nominated - BIFA for Best British Independent Film; Nominated - European Film Award for Best Documentary; Nominated - Satellite Award for Best Documentary Film |
| November 5, 1999 | American Movie | Worldwide | Nominated - Satellite Award for Best Documentary Film |
| November 5, 1999 | All About My Mother | U.S. and Canada | Academy Award for Best Foreign Language Film; BAFTA Award for Best Film Not in the English Language; BIFA for Best Foreign Independent Film; César Award for Best Foreign Film; David di Donatello for Best Foreign Film; European Film Award for Best Film; Golden Globe Award for Best Foreign Language Film; National Board of Review Award for Best Foreign Language Film; Satellite Award for Best Foreign Language Film; Nominated - Independent Spirit Award for Best International Film |
| December 3, 1999 | Sweet and Lowdown | U.S., Canada, the U.K. and Ireland | currently co-owned by WestEnd Films with distribution handled by Quiver Distribution |
| December 17, 1999 | The Emperor and the Assassin | U.S., Canada, the U.K., Ireland, Australia, New Zealand and South Africa | Nominated - BIFA for Best Foreign Independent Film; Nominated - Satellite Award for Best Foreign Language Film |
| December 29, 1999 | The Third Miracle | U.S., Canada, Australia and New Zealand | |

== 2000s ==
| Release date | Title | Market(s) | Notes |
|---|---|---|---|
| February 18, 2000 | Not One Less | U.S. and Canada | Golden Lion |
| February 25, 2000 | Mifune | U.S., Australia and New Zealand | Silver Bear Grand Jury Prize; Nominated - Bodil Award for Best Danish Film; Nominated - European Film Award for Best Film; Danish entry for Academy Award for Best Foreign Language Film |
| March 31, 2000 | The Color of Paradise | U.S. and Canada | |
| April 7, 2000 | Me Myself I | North and South America | |
| May 5, 2000 | East/West | U.S., Australia and New Zealand | Nominated - Academy Award for Best Foreign Language Film; Nominated - César Award for Best Foreign Film; Nominated - Golden Globe Award for Best Foreign Language Film |
| May 12, 2000 | Bossa Nova | Worldwide | |
| May 26, 2000 | Kikujiro | U.S., Canada, Australia and New Zealand | Nominated - Japan Academy Film Prize for Picture of the Year |
| June 9, 2000 | Groove | Worldwide | |
| June 28, 2000 | Trixie | U.S., Canada, the U.K., Ireland, Australia and New Zealand | |
| July 7, 2000 | Shower | U.S., Canada, Australia and New Zealand | Nominated - Satellite Award for Best Foreign Language Film |
| August 4, 2000 | The Tao of Steve | U.S. and Canada | |
| August 25, 2000 | Solomon & Gaenor | U.S. and Canada | Nominated - Academy Award for Best Foreign Language Film |
| September 15, 2000 | Goya in Bordeaux | U.S. and Canada | Nominated - Satellite Award for Best Foreign Language Film |
| September 29, 2000 | The Broken Hearts Club | Worldwide | GLAAD Media Award for Outstanding Film – Limited Release |
| October 13, 2000 | Just Looking | Worldwide | |
| December 8, 2000 | Crouching Tiger, Hidden Dragon | North and Hispanic America, the U.K. and Ireland | Academy Award for Best Foreign Language Film; BAFTA Award for Best Film Not in the English Language; Bodil Award for Best Non-American Film; Critics' Choice Movie Award for Best Foreign Language Film; Golden Globe Award for Best Foreign Language Film; Hong Kong Film Award for Best Film; Independent Spirit Award for Best Film; National Board of Review Award for Best Foreign Language Film; Saturn Award for Best Action, Adventure or Thriller Film; Toronto International Film Festival People's Choice Award; Nominated - Academy Award for Best Picture; Nominated - BAFTA Award for Best Film; Nominated - Critics' Choice Movie Award for Best Picture |
| December 22, 2000 | The House of Mirth | U.S., Canada, Scandinavia, Italy, Australia and New Zealand | Nominated - BAFTA Award for Outstanding British Film; Nominated - BIFA Award for Best British Independent Film |
| January 22, 2001 | Haiku Tunnel | U.S. and Canada | |
| February 6, 2001 | Pollock | Worldwide excluding Scandinavia, Greece and Cyprus | |
| March 2, 2001 | Me You Them | U.S. and Canada | Grande Prêmio do Cinema Brasileiro for Best Film |
| April 6, 2001 | Brother | U.S. and Canada | |
| April 6, 2001 | Shadow Magic | U.S., Canada, Australia and New Zealand | |
| April 27, 2001 | The Luzhin Defence | U.S., Canada, Australia, New Zealand, Germany and Austria | currently owned by Samuel Goldwyn Films |
| April 27, 2001 | The Princess and the Warrior | North and Latin America, Australia and New Zealand | Nominated - German Film Award for Best Fiction Film |
| May 25, 2001 | The Road Home | U.S. | Silver Bear Grand Jury Prize; Nominated - Golden Bear |
| June 8, 2001 | Divided We Fall | U.S. and Canada | Czech Lion Award for Best Film; Nominated - Academy Award for Best Foreign Language Film |
| July 6, 2001 | The Vertical Ray of the Sun | U.S., Canada, Australia and New Zealand | Vietnamese entry for the Academy Award for Best Foreign Language Film |
| July 27, 2001 | Jackpot | U.S., Canada, Australia and New Zealand | |
| September 29, 2001 | Va savoir | U.S. and Canada | Nominated - Palme d'Or |
| October 5, 2001 | Grateful Dawg | Worldwide | |
| November 21, 2001 | The Devil's Backbone | U.S., Canada, Australia and New Zealand | |
| December 7, 2001 | Last Orders | North and Latin America, Scandinavia, Australia, New Zealand, Germany and Austria | |
| December 28, 2001 | Dark Blue World | U.S., Canada, U.K., Ireland, Australia and New Zealand | Czech entry for the Academy Award for Best Foreign Language Film |
| January 25, 2002 | Beijing Bicycle | U.S., Australia and New Zealand | Silver Bear Grand Jury Prize; Nominated - Golden Bear |
| March 15, 2002 | Pauline and Paulette | U.S., Canada, the U.K., Ireland, Australia, New Zealand, South Africa and Scandinavia | Belgian entry for the Academy Award for Best Foreign Language Film |
| March 22, 2002 | Son of the Bride | U.S., Canada, Australia and New Zealand | Nominated - Academy Award for Best Foreign Language Film |
| April 5, 2002 | Crush | U.S. and Canada | |
| April 19, 2002 | Nine Queens | U.S. and Canada | |
| May 8, 2002 | Lagaan: Once Upon a Time in India | U.S. and Canada | limited theatrical re-release; originally distributed by SET Pictures; Filmfare Award for Best Film; Nominated - Academy Award for Best Foreign Language Film; Nominated - European Film Award for Best Non-European Film |
| May 10, 2002 | The Lady and the Duke | U.S. and Canada | |
| May 20, 2002 | Dogtown and Z-Boys | U.S., Canada, the U.K., Ireland, Australia, New Zealand and South Africa | |
| June 21, 2002 | Sunshine State | Worldwide | |
| July 5, 2002 | Thirteen Conversations About One Thing | U.S. and Canada | |
| July 12, 2002 | My Wife Is an Actress | U.S. and Canada | |
| July 26, 2002 | Happy Times | U.S. and Canada | |
| August 9, 2002 | Secret Ballot | U.S. and Canada | |
| August 30, 2002 | Mad Love | U.S. and Canada | Spanish entry for the Academy Award for Best Foreign Language Film |
| September 13, 2002 | Quitting | U.S., Australia and New Zealand | |
| October 18, 2002 | Auto Focus | Worldwide | |
| November 22, 2002 | Talk to Her | U.S. and Canada | BAFTA Award for Best Film Not in the English Language; César Award for Best Film from the European Union; European Film Award for Best Film; Golden Globe Award for Best Foreign Language Film; National Board of Review Award for Best Foreign Language Film; Nominated - David di Donatello for Best Foreign Film |
| December 20, 2002 | Spider | U.S., Australia, New Zealand, Germany and Austria | Nominated - Palme d'Or |
| December 30, 2002 | Love Liza | North and Latin America, the U.K., Ireland, Australia, New Zealand and South Africa | |
| January 17, 2003 | Big Shot's Funeral | U.S. and Canada | |
| January 24, 2003 | Blind Spot: Hitler's Secretary | U.S., Canada, the U.K., Ireland, Australia, New Zealand, South Africa and Mexico | Nominated - European Film Award for Best Documentary |
| February 14, 2003 | All the Real Girls | North and Latin America, the U.K., Ireland, Australia, New Zealand and South Africa | Nominated - Grand Jury Prize Dramatic |
| March 7, 2003 | Laurel Canyon | North and Latin America, the U.K., Ireland, Spain, Germany and Austria | |
| April 4, 2003 | The Man Without a Past | U.S. and Canada | Grand Prix (Cannes Film Festival); Jussi Award for Best Film; Nominated - Academy Award for Best Foreign Language Film; Nominated - César Award for Best Film from the European Union; Nominated - European Film Award for Best Film; Nominated - Palme d'Or |
| April 4, 2003 | Levity | U.S. and Canada | |
| April 18, 2003 | Winged Migration | North and Latin America, the U.K., Ireland, South Africa and Scandinavia | Nominated - Academy Award for Best Documentary Feature; Nominated - European Film Award for Best Documentary; Nominated - Goya Award for Best Documentary |
| May 2, 2003 | Owning Mahowny | U.S. | |
| May 23, 2003 | Respiro | U.S. and Canada | Nominated - César Award for Best Film from the European Union; Nominated - David di Donatello for Best Film |
| June 20, 2003 | The Legend of Suriyothai | North and Latin America, Australia and New Zealand | |
| July 11, 2003 | The Cuckoo | U.S. and Canada | Nika Award for Best Picture |
| July 24, 2003 | Masked and Anonymous | U.S. and Canada | |
| August 29, 2003 | Once Upon a Time in the Midlands | North and Latin America, Australia and New Zealand | |
| September 26, 2003 | My Life Without Me | U.S. | Nominated - European Film Award for Best Film; Nominated - Goya Award for Best Film |
| November 26, 2003 | The Triplets of Belleville | U.S., Australia and New Zealand | Genie Award for Best Motion Picture; Satellite Award for Best Animated or Mixed Media Feature; Nominated - Academy Award for Best Animated Feature; Nominated - Annie Award for Best Animated Feature; Nominated - BAFTA Award for Best Film Not in the English Language; Nominated - César Award for Best Film; Nominated - Independent Spirit Award for Best International Film |
| December 3, 2003 | Monsieur Ibrahim | North and Latin America, Australia and New Zealand | Nominated - Golden Globe Award for Best Foreign Language Film; Nominated - Goya Award for Best European Film |
| December 12, 2003 | The Statement | U.S., Australia and New Zealand | |
| December 19, 2003 | The Fog of War | Worldwide | Academy Award for Best Documentary Feature; Independent Spirit Award for Best Documentary Feature; National Board of Review Award for Best Documentary Film; Nominated - Critics' Choice Movie Award for Best Documentary Feature; Inducted into the National Film Registry in 2019 |
| December 25, 2003 | The Company | U.S. and Canada | |
| February 27, 2004 | Good Bye Lenin! | U.S. and Canada | César Award for Best Film from the European Union; European Film Award for Best Film; German Film Award for Best Fiction Film; Goya Award for Best European Film; Nominated - BAFTA Award for Best Film Not in the English Language; Nominated - Golden Bear; Nominated - Golden Globe Award for Best Foreign Language Film; German entry for the Academy Award for Best Foreign Language Film |
| March 12, 2004 | Broken Wings | U.S. and Canada | Israeli entry for the Academy Award for Best Foreign Language Film |
| March 19, 2004 | Bon Voyage | North and Latin America, Australia and New Zealand | Nominated - César Award for Best Film; French entry for the Academy Award for Best Foreign Language Film |
| April 2, 2004 | Spring, Summer, Fall, Winter... and Spring | U.S. and Canada | South Korean entry for the Academy Award for Best Foreign Language Film |
| April 16, 2004 | Young Adam | U.S. and Canada | |
| May 14, 2004 | Carandiru | Worldwide | Brazilian entry for the Academy Award for Best Foreign Language Film; Nominated - Grande Prêmio do Cinema Brasileiro for Best Film |
| May 28, 2004 | Baadasssss! | North and Latin America | Nominated - Independent Spirit Award for Best Feature |
| May 28, 2004 | The Mother | U.S. and Canada | |
| June 18, 2004 | Facing Windows | U.S. and Canada | David di Donatello for Best Film |
| July 9, 2004 | Riding Giants | U.S., Canada, the U.K., Ireland, Australia, New Zealand and South Africa | |
| July 16, 2004 | Touch of Pink | Worldwide excluding the U.K., Ireland, India and Greece | |
| July 16, 2004 | Zhou Yu's Train | North and Latin America, the U.K., Ireland, Australia, New Zealand and South Africa | |
| July 28, 2004 | She Hate Me | North and Latin America, the U.K., Ireland, Australia, New Zealand and South Africa | |
| September 3, 2004 | Warriors of Heaven and Earth | U.S. and Canada | Chinese entry for the Academy Award for Best Foreign Language Film |
| September 17, 2004 | Head in the Clouds | U.S., U.K., Ireland, Australia, New Zealand and South Africa | |
| September 17, 2004 | Želary | U.S. and Canada | Nominated - Academy Award for Best Foreign Language Film; Nominated - Czech Lion Award for Best Film |
| October 15, 2004 | Being Julia | U.S., U.K., Ireland, Australia, New Zealand and South Africa | Nominated - Genie Award for Best Motion Picture |
| October 22, 2004 | Lightning in a Bottle | U.S., Canada, the U.K., Ireland, Australia, New Zealand and South Africa | |
| November 19, 2004 | Bad Education | U.S. and Canada | Nominated - Goya Award for Best Film |
| December 3, 2004 | House of Flying Daggers | U.S., Canada, Spain, India and Singapore | limited release; expanded nationwide on January 14, 2005; Nominated - BAFTA Award for Best Film Not in the English Language; European Film Award for Best Non-European Film; Chinese entry for the Academy Award for Best Foreign Language Film |
| December 17, 2004 | Imaginary Heroes | U.S., Canada, the U.K., Ireland, Italy, Germany and Austria | |
| December 29, 2004 | The Merchant of Venice | U.S., Canada, Germany and Austria | Nominated - David di Donatello for Best European Film |
| February 25, 2005 | Up and Down | U.S. and Canada | Czech Lion Award for Best Film; Czech entry for the Academy Award for Best Foreign Language Film |
| March 11, 2005 | In My Country | North and Latin America, U.K., Ireland, Australia, New Zealand, Germany, Austria and Scandinavia | |
| April 1, 2005 | Look at Me | U.S. and Hispanic America | Nominated - Palme d'Or |
| April 8, 2005 | Kung Fu Hustle | U.S. and Canada | limited release in Los Angeles and New York City; expanded nationwide on April 22; Hong Kong Film Award for Best Film; Nominated - BAFTA Award for Best Film Not in the English Language; Nominated - Golden Globe Award for Best Foreign Language Film |
| April 29, 2005 | 3-Iron | U.S. and Canada | Nominated - David di Donatello for Best Foreign Film; Nominated - Golden Lion |
| May 13, 2005 | Layer Cake | Worldwide excluding the U.K. and Ireland | |
| May 27, 2005 | Saving Face | Worldwide | co-production with Destination Films |
| June 17, 2005 | Heights | North and Latin America, U.K., Ireland, Australia, New Zealand, Scandinavia and Spain | |
| June 24, 2005 | Yes | U.S. and Canada | |
| July 8, 2005 | Saraband | North America, Australia, New Zealand and select Latin American territories including Mexico and Brazil | Nominated - César Award for Best Film from the European Union |
| July 8, 2005 | The Beautiful Country | North and Latin America, the U.K., Ireland, Australia, New Zealand and Spain | Nominated - Golden Bear |
| July 22, 2005 | November | U.S. and Canada | Nominated - Grand Jury Prize Dramatic |
| August 5, 2005 | 2046 | U.S. and Canada | European Film Award for Best Non-European Film; Nominated - David di Donatello for Best Foreign Film; Nominated - Hong Kong Film Award for Best Film; Nominated - Palme d'Or |
| August 5, 2005 | Junebug | U.S. and Canada | Nominated - Grand Jury Prize Dramatic |
| August 26, 2005 | The Memory of a Killer | U.S. and Canada | Dutch entry for the Academy Award for Best Foreign Language Film |
| September 16, 2005 | Thumbsucker | North and Latin America, the U.K., Ireland, Australia, New Zealand, South Africa, France, Italy and Japan | Nominated - Golden Bear; Nominated - Grand Jury Prize Dramatic |
| September 30, 2005 | Capote | Worldwide | distribution only; produced by United Artists; Nominated - Academy Award for Best Picture; Nominated - BAFTA Award for Best Film; Nominated - Critics' Choice Movie Award for Best Picture; Nominated - GLAAD Media Award for Outstanding Film - Wide Release; Nominated - Golden Bear; Nominated - Independent Spirit Award for Best Feature; Nominated - Producers Guild of America Award for Best Theatrical Motion Picture |
| October 28, 2005 | The Passenger | Worldwide | limited theatrical re-release; originally distributed by Metro-Goldwyn-Mayer thru United Artists |
| November 9, 2005 | Joyeux Noël | U.S., U.K., Ireland, Latin America and Italy | Nominated - Academy Award for Best Foreign Language Film; Nominated - BAFTA Award for Best Film Not in the English Language; Nominated - César Award for Best Film; Nominated - Golden Globe Award for Best Foreign Language Film |
| November 16, 2005 | Breakfast on Pluto | North and Latin America, Germany, Austria and South Africa | Nominated - European Film Award for Best Film |
| December 12, 2005 | The Three Burials of Melquiades Estrada | North and Hispanic America | Nominated - Independent Spirit Award for Best Feature; Nominated - Palme d'Or |
| December 21, 2005 | The White Countess | North and Latin America, the U.K., Ireland, Australia, New Zealand, South Africa, France, Germany, Austria, Eastern Europe, Spain, Scandinavia, the Benelux, the Middle East and Asia excluding Japan | |
| December 23, 2005 | Caché (Hidden) | U.S., English-speaking Canada and Mexico | European Film Award for Best Film; Nominated - David di Donatello for Best European Film; Nominated - Palme d'Or; Austrian entry for the Academy Award for Best Foreign Language Film (disqualified) |
| January 20, 2006 | Why We Fight | U.S. and Canada | |
| March 17, 2006 | Don't Come Knocking | U.S., Canada, the U.K., Ireland, Australia, New Zealand and South Africa | |
| March 24, 2006 | L'Enfant (The Child) | U.S. | Palme d'Or; Nominated - César Award for Best Film; Nominated - David di Donatello for Best European Film; Nominated - European Film Award for Best Film; Belgian entry for the Academy Award for Best Foreign Language Film |
| March 31, 2006 | The Devil and Daniel Johnston | U.S. and Canada | |
| April 7, 2006 | Friends with Money | Worldwide excluding Australia, New Zealand and Scandinavia | |
| May 5, 2006 | Art School Confidential | Worldwide | distribution only; produced by United Artists |
| May 12, 2006 | Sketches of Frank Gehry | U.S. and Canada | |
| June 28, 2006 | Who Killed the Electric Car? | Worldwide | |
| August 2, 2006 | Quinceañera | North and Latin America | GLAAD Media Award for Outstanding Film – Limited Release |
| August 11, 2006 | The House of Sand | U.S. and Canada | Nominated - Grande Prêmio do Cinema Brasileiro for Best Film |
| August 25, 2006 | The Quiet | Worldwide | North American distribution rights currently co-owned by Samuel Goldwyn Films |
| September 1, 2006 | Riding Alone for Thousands of Miles | U.S. and Canada | |
| September 22, 2006 | American Hardcore | U.S., Canada, Mexico, the U.K., Ireland, Australia, New Zealand, Germany and Austria | |
| September 29, 2006 | Matador | U.S. and Canada | 20th anniversary re-release; originally distributed by Cinevista |
| October 13, 2006 | Driving Lessons | U.S. and Canada | |
| November 3, 2006 | Volver | U.S., Canada and India | Goya Award for Best Film; National Board of Review Award for Best Foreign Language Film; Nominated - BAFTA Award for Best Film Not in the English Language; Nominated - César Award for Best Foreign Film; Nominated - Critics' Choice Movie Award for Best Foreign Language Film; Nominated - David di Donatello for Best European Film; Nominated - European Film Award for Best Film; Nominated - Golden Globe Award for Best Foreign Language Film; Nominated - Palme d'Or; Shortlisted - Academy Award for Best Foreign Language Film |
| December 21, 2006 | Curse of the Golden Flower | North and Latin America, Spain and India | limited release; expanded nationwide on January 12, 2007; Nominated - Hong Kong Film Award for Best Film; Chinese entry for the Academy Award for Best Foreign Language Film |
| January 19, 2007 | The Italian | U.S. and Canada | |
| January 30, 2007 | Women on the Verge of a Nervous Breakdown | U.S. and Canada | reissued as part of the DVD box set Viva Pedro: The Almodóvar Collection; originally distributed by Orion Classics; Goya Award for Best Film; Nominated - Academy Award for Best Foreign Language Film; Nominated - BAFTA Award for Best Film Not in the English Language; Nominated - Golden Globe Award for Best Foreign Language Film; Nominated - Golden Lion |
| January 30, 2007 | Live Flesh | U.S. and Canada | reissued as part of the box set Viva Pedro: The Almodóvar Collection; originally distributed by Goldwyn Films; Nominated - BAFTA Award for Best Film Not in the English Language; Nominated - European Film Award for Best Film |
| January 30, 2007 | Law of Desire | U.S. and Canada | reissued as part of the box set Viva Pedro: The Almodóvar Collection; originally distributed by Cinevista; Inaugural winner of the Teddy Award; Nominated - Golden Bear |
| February 9, 2007 | The Lives of Others | U.S. and Canada | Academy Award for Best Foreign Language Film; BAFTA Award for Best Film Not in the English Language; César Award for Best Foreign Film; David di Donatello for Best European Film; European Film Award for Best Film; German Film Award for Best Fiction Film; Independent Spirit Award for Best International Film; Nominated - BAFTA Award for Best Film; Nominated - Golden Globe Award for Best Foreign Language Film |
| March 23, 2007 | Offside | U.S. and Canada | |
| April 4, 2007 | Black Book | U.S., Canada, Australia, New Zealand and India | Nominated - BAFTA Award for Best Film Not in the English Language; Shortlisted - Academy Award for Best Foreign Language Film |
| April 20, 2007 | The Valet | U.S. and Canada | |
| April 27, 2007 | Jindabyne | U.S., Canada, Germany and Austria | Nominated - AACTA Award for Best Film |
| May 25, 2007 | Paprika | U.S. and Canada | Nominated - Golden Lion |
| May 25, 2007 | Angel-A | U.S. and Canada | |
| June 29, 2007 | Vitus | U.S. and Canada | Shortlisted - Academy Award for Best Foreign Language Film |
| July 13, 2007 | Interview | U.S. | |
| July 27, 2007 | Molière | U.S. | |
| September 21, 2007 | The Jane Austen Book Club | Worldwide | |
| October 5, 2007 | My Kid Could Paint That | Worldwide | |
| October 12, 2007 | Sleuth | North and Latin America, France, Scandinavia, Spain and Italy | distribution only; produced by Castle Rock Entertainment |
| October 26, 2007 | Jimmy Carter Man from Plains | U.S. and Canada | |
| December 14, 2007 | Youth Without Youth | U.S., Canada, Germany and Austria | |
| December 21, 2007 | Steep | U.S. and Canada | |
| December 25, 2007 | Persepolis | North and Latin America | Jury Prize (Cannes Film Festival); Nominated - Academy Award for Best Animated Feature; Nominated - Annie Award for Best Animated Feature; Nominated - BAFTA Award for Best Animated Film; Nominated - BAFTA Award for Best Film Not in the English Language; Nominated - César Award for Best Film; Nominated - Critics' Choice Movie Award for Best Animated Feature; Nominated - European Film Award for Best Film; Nominated - Golden Globe Award for Best Foreign Language Film; Nominated - Independent Spirit Award for Best International Film; Nominated - Palme d'Or; French entry for the Academy Award for Best Foreign Language Film |
| February 22, 2008 | The Counterfeiters | U.S. and Canada | Academy Award for Best Foreign Language Film; Nominated - German Film Award for Best Fiction Film; Nominated - Golden Bear |
| March 7, 2008 | Married Life | U.S. and France | |
| March 14, 2008 | CJ7 | U.S. and Canada | Nominated - Hong Kong Film Award for Best Film |
| March 21, 2008 | The Band's Visit | U.S., English-speaking Canada, U.K., Ireland and Scandinavia | Nominated - Independent Spirit Award for Best International Film |
| April 25, 2008 | Standard Operating Procedure | Worldwide | Silver Bear Grand Jury Prize; Nominated - Critics' Choice Movie Award for Best Documentary Feature; Nominated - Golden Bear |
| May 9, 2008 | Redbelt | Worldwide | |
| May 23, 2008 | The Children of Huang Shi | U.S. and Canada | |
| June 13, 2008 | Baghead | U.S. and Canada | |
| June 20, 2008 | Brick Lane | North and Latin America | |
| July 3, 2008 | The Wackness | U.S. and Canada | Nominated - Grand Jury Prize Dramatic |
| July 4, 2008 | When Did You Last See Your Father? | North and Latin America | |
| August 1, 2008 | Frozen River | North and Latin America, Australia and New Zealand | Grand Jury Prize Dramatic; Nominated - Independent Spirit Award for Best Feature |
| August 29, 2008 | I Served the King of England | U.S. and Canada | Czech Lion Award for Best Film; Nominated - Golden Bear; Czech entry for the Academy Award for Best Foreign Language Film |
| October 3, 2008 | Rachel Getting Married | Worldwide | Nominated - Independent Spirit Award for Best Feature |
| October 10, 2008 | Ashes of Time Redux | U.S. and Canada | Nominated - Golden Lion; Nominated - Hong Kong Film Award for Best Film |
| October 24, 2008 | I've Loved You So Long | U.S. and Canada | BAFTA Award for Best Film Not in the English Language; Nominated - Critics' Choice Movie Award for Best Foreign Language Film; Nominated - César Award for Best Film; Nominated - Golden Bear; Nominated - Golden Globe Award for Best Foreign Language Film |
| October 24, 2008 | Synecdoche, New York | U.S. | Nominated - Palme d'Or |
| December 19, 2008 | The Class | U.S., Canada, Mexico, Australia and New Zealand | Independent Spirit Award for Best International Film; Palme d'Or; Nominated - Academy Award for Best Foreign Language Film; Nominated - César Award for Best Film; Nominated - David di Donatello for Best European Film; Nominated - European Film Award for Best Film; Nominated - Goya Award for Best European Film |
| December 25, 2008 | Waltz with Bashir | U.S. and Latin America | César Award for Best Foreign Film; Critics' Choice Movie Award for Best Foreign Language Film; Golden Globe Award for Best Foreign Language Film; Nominated - Academy Award for Best Foreign Language Film; Nominated - Annie Award for Best Animated Feature; Nominated - BAFTA Award for Best Film Not in the English Language; Nominated - European Film Award for Best Film; Nominated - Palme d'Or |
| March 4, 2009 | 12 | U.S. and Canada | Special Golden Lion; Nominated - Academy Award for Best Foreign Language Film; Nominated - Golden Lion |
| April 3, 2009 | Sugar | North and Latin America excluding television | |
| April 3, 2009 | Paris 36 | U.S., Australasia and Scandinavia | |
| April 17, 2009 | Every Little Step | U.S., Canada, Australia and New Zealand | |
| April 24, 2009 | Tyson | U.S. and Canada | |
| May 8, 2009 | Rudo y Cursi | U.S. and Canada | |
| May 8, 2009 | Adoration | U.S., Latin America, Australia and New Zealand | |
| May 22, 2009 | O' Horten | U.S. and Canada | Norwegian entry for the Academy Award for Best Foreign Language Film |
| May 22, 2009 | Easy Virtue | U.S., Latin America, Germany, Austria and South Africa | |
| June 12, 2009 | Moon | North and Latin America, the U.K., Ireland, Australia, New Zealand, South Africa, Spain, Italy and Asia excluding Korea | Nominated - BAFTA Award for Outstanding British Film |
| June 19, 2009 | Whatever Works | U.S. | |
| July 10, 2009 | Soul Power | North and Latin America | |
| July 31, 2009 | Lorna's Silence | U.S. and Canada | Nominated - César Award for Best Foreign Film; Nominated - Palme d'Or |
| August 14, 2009 | It Might Get Loud | North and Latin America, Australia, New Zealand and South Africa | |
| September 25, 2009 | Coco Before Chanel | U.S. | Nominated - BAFTA Award for Best Film Not in the English Language |
| October 9, 2009 | The Damned United | U.S. and Canada | |
| October 9, 2009 | An Education | North and Latin America, Germany, Austria, Switzerland, Spain, Italy, the CIS and Asia | Independent Spirit Award for Best International Film; Nominated - Academy Award for Best Picture; Nominated - BAFTA Award for Best Film; Nominated - BAFTA Award for Outstanding British Film |
| November 20, 2009 | Broken Embraces | U.S. and Canada | Satellite Award for Best Foreign Language Film; Nominated - BAFTA Award for Best Film Not in the English Language; Nominated - Golden Globe for Best Foreign Language Film; Nominated - Palme d'Or |
| December 25, 2009 | The Imaginarium of Doctor Parnassus | U.S., Latin America, Scandinavia and Spain | |
| December 30, 2009 | The White Ribbon | U.S. and Canada | European Film Award for Best Film; German Film Award for Best Fiction Film; Golden Globe Award for Best Foreign Language Film; Palme d'Or; Nominated - Academy Award for Best Foreign Language Film; Nominated - BAFTA Award for Best Film Not in the English Language; Nominated - César Award for Best Foreign Film; Nominated - Critics' Choice Movie Award for Best Foreign Language Film; Nominated - David di Donatello for Best European Film; Nominated - Goya Award for Best European Film |

== 2010s ==
| Release date | Title | Market(s) | Notes |
|---|---|---|---|
| January 15, 2010 | The Last Station | North and Latin America, Scandinavia, Italy, Spain and Japan | |
| February 26, 2010 | A Prophet (Un Prophete) | North and Latin America, Scandinavia, Australia, New Zealand, South Africa, Germany and Austria | BAFTA Award for Best Film Not in the English Language; César Award for Best Film; Grand Prix (Cannes Film Festival); National Board of Review Award for Best Foreign Language Film; Nominated - Academy Award for Best Foreign Language Film; Nominated - David di Donatello for Best European Film; Nominated - European Film Award for Best Film; Nominated - Golden Globe Award for Best Foreign Language Film; Nominated - Independent Spirit Award for Best International Film |
| March 26, 2010 | Chloe | U.S. | |
| April 30, 2010 | Please Give | Worldwide excluding Australia, New Zealand and Scandinavia | |
| May 7, 2010 | Mother and Child | U.S. | |
| May 21, 2010 | The Secret in Their Eyes | U.S. and Canada | Academy Award for Best Foreign Language Film; Goya Award for Best Spanish Language Foreign Film; Nominated - BAFTA Award for Best Film Not in the English Language; Nominated - César Award for Best Foreign Film; Nominated - David di Donatello for Best European Film; Nominated - European Film Award for Best Film |
| June 11, 2010 | Micmacs | U.S. and Latin America | |
| June 25, 2010 | Wild Grass | U.S., Australia and New Zealand | |
| July 23, 2010 | Coco Chanel & Igor Stravinsky | U.S. and English-speaking Canada | |
| July 30, 2010 | Get Low | North and Latin America, the U.K., Ireland, Germany, Austria, Switzerland, the CIS and South Africa | |
| August 6, 2010 | Lebanon | U.S. | Golden Lion; Nominated - European Film Award for Best Film |
| August 13, 2010 | Animal Kingdom | U.S. and Latin America | AACTA Award for Best Film |
| September 3, 2010 | A Woman, a Gun and a Noodle Shop | North and Latin America, Australia and New Zealand | |
| September 22, 2010 | You Will Meet a Tall Dark Stranger | U.S. and Canada | |
| October 8, 2010 | Inside Job | Worldwide | |
| October 8, 2010 | Tamara Drewe | North and Latin America | |
| November 19, 2010 | Made in Dagenham | U.S., Latin America, Spain and Japan | Nominated - BAFTA Award for Outstanding British Film |
| December 25, 2010 | The Illusionist | U.S. and Canada | César Award for Best Animated Film; European Film Award for Best Animated Feature Film; Nominated - Academy Award for Best Animated Feature; Nominated - Annie Award for Best Animated Feature; Nominated - Golden Globe Award for Best Animated Feature Film |
| December 29, 2010 | Another Year | U.S. and Canada | Nominated - BAFTA Award for Outstanding British Film; Nominated - Palme d'Or |
| January 14, 2011 | Barney's Version | U.S. | Nominated - Genie Award for Best Motion Picture |
| February 25, 2011 | Of Gods and Men | U.S., Canada, Australia and New Zealand | Cesar Award for Best Film; Grand Prix (Cannes Film Festival); National Board of Review Award for Best Foreign Language Film; Nominated - BAFTA Award for Best Film Not in the English Language; Nominated - European Film Award for Best Film; French entry for the Academy Award for Best Foreign Language Film |
| March 18, 2011 | Winter in Wartime | U.S. and Canada | Shortlisted - Academy Award for Best Foreign Language Film |
| April 1, 2011 | In a Better World | U.S. and Canada | Academy Award for Best Foreign Language Film; Golden Globe Award for Best Foreign Language Film; Nominated - Bodil Award for Best Danish Film; Nominated - David di Donatello for Best European Film; Nominated - European Film Award for Best Film |
| April 22, 2011 | Incendies | U.S. | Genie Award for Best Motion Picture; Nominated - Academy Award for Best Foreign Language Film; Nominated - BAFTA Award for Best Film Not in the English Language; Nominated - César Award for Best Foreign Film; Nominated - David di Donatello for Best Foreign Film |
| April 22, 2011 | POM Wonderful Presents: The Greatest Movie Ever Sold | U.S. and Canada | co-distributed with Stage 6 Films |
| May 20, 2011 | Midnight in Paris | U.S. and Canada | Nominated - Academy Award for Best Picture; Nominated - Golden Globe Award for Best Motion Picture - Musical or Comedy; Nominated - Producers Guild of America Award for Best Theatrical Motion Picture |
| July 8, 2011 | Beats, Rhymes & Life: The Travels of A Tribe Called Quest | U.S. and Canada | |
| July 15, 2011 | Life, Above All | U.S. and Canada | Shortlisted - Academy Award for Best Foreign Language Film |
| July 29, 2011 | The Guard | All rights excluding airlines in the U.S. and Latin America | Nominated - World Cinema Grand Jury Prize Dramatic |
| August 26, 2011 | Higher Ground | Worldwide | |
| September 16, 2011 | Restless | Worldwide | |
| September 30, 2011 | Take Shelter | North and Latin America, Australia and New Zealand | |
| October 14, 2011 | The Skin I Live In | U.S. and Canada | BAFTA Award for Best Film Not in the English Language; Nominated - Golden Globe Award for Best Foreign Language Film; Nominated - Goya Award for Best Film; Nominated - Palme d'Or; Nominated - Queer Palm |
| November 23, 2011 | A Dangerous Method | U.S. | Nominated - Genie Award for Best Motion Picture |
| December 16, 2011 | Carnage | U.S., Canada, Australia, New Zealand, South Africa and Japan | Nominated - Goya Award for Best European Film |
| December 30, 2011 | A Separation | U.S. and Canada | Academy Award for Best Foreign Language Film; César Award for Best Foreign Film; David di Donatello for Best Foreign Film; Golden Bear; Independent Spirit Award for Best International Film; National Board of Review Award for Best Foreign Language Film; Nominated - BAFTA Award for Best Film Not in the English Language |
| February 10, 2012 | In Darkness | U.S. | Nominated - Academy Award for Best Foreign Language Film |
| March 9, 2012 | Footnote | North and Latin America | Nominated - Academy Award for Best Foreign Language Film; Nominated - Palme d'Or |
| March 23, 2012 | The Raid: Redemption | U.S., Latin America and Spain | co-distributed with Stage 6 Films |
| April 6, 2012 | Damsels in Distress | Worldwide | |
| April 20, 2012 | Darling Companion | U.S. and Canada | |
| May 11, 2012 | Where Do We Go Now? | U.S. and Canada | Toronto International Film Festival People's Choice Award; Lebanese entry for the Academy Award for Best Foreign Language Film |
| May 18, 2012 | Hysteria | U.S., U.K., Ireland and South Africa | |
| June 22, 2012 | To Rome with Love | U.S. and Canada | |
| June 29, 2012 | Neil Young Journeys | Worldwide excluding Latin America | |
| July 27, 2012 | Searching for Sugar Man | U.S. and Canada excluding airlines | Academy Award for Best Documentary Feature; BAFTA Award for Best Documentary; National Board of Review Award for Best Documentary Film; Producers Guild of America Award for Best Documentary Motion Picture |
| August 3, 2012 | Celeste and Jesse Forever | North and Latin America, Eastern Europe, the Baltics and the CIS | |
| August 17, 2012 | Chicken with Plums | U.S. and Latin America | Nominated - Golden Lion |
| October 12, 2012 | Smashed | Worldwide | |
| November 23, 2012 | Rust and Bone | North and Latin America, Eastern Europe, the Baltics and the CIS | Nominated - BAFTA Award for Best Film Not in the English Language; Nominated - César Award for Best Film; Nominated - Critics' Choice Movie Award for Best Foreign Language Film; Nominated - David di Donatello for Best European Film; Nominated - Golden Globe Award for Best Foreign Language Film; Nominated - Goya Award for Best European Film; Nominated - Independent Spirit Award for Best International Film; Nominated - Palme d'Or |
| December 19, 2012 | Amour | U.S. and Canada | Academy Award for Best Foreign Language Film; BAFTA Award for Best Film Not in the English Language; César Award for Best Film; David di Donatello for Best European Film; European Film Award for Best Film; Golden Globe Award for Best Foreign Language Film; Independent Spirit Award for Best International Film; National Board of Review Award for Best Foreign Language Film; Palme d'Or; Nominated - Academy Award for Best Picture |
| December 25, 2012 | West of Memphis | Worldwide | |
| February 1, 2013 | The Gatekeepers | U.S. and Canada | Nominated - Academy Award for Best Documentary Feature Film |
| February 15, 2013 | No | U.S. and Canada | Nominated - Academy Award for Best Foreign Language Film |
| April 5, 2013 | The Company You Keep | U.S. | |
| April 24, 2013 | At Any Price | U.S., Canada and Eastern Europe | |
| May 3, 2013 | Love Is All You Need | U.S. and Canada | |
| May 24, 2013 | Before Midnight | U.S., Canada, the U.K. and Ireland | |
| May 24, 2013 | Fill the Void | U.S. and Canada | Nominated - Golden Lion; Israeli entry for the Academy Award for Best Foreign Language Film |
| June 28, 2013 | I'm So Excited | U.S. and Canada | |
| July 26, 2013 | Blue Jasmine | U.S. and Canada | Nominated - César Award for Best Foreign Film |
| August 14, 2013 | The Patience Stone | U.S. | Afghan entry for the Academy Award for Best Foreign Language Film |
| August 16, 2013 | Austenland | Worldwide | co-distribution with Stage 6 Films only |
| September 13, 2013 | Wadjda | U.S. and Canada | Nominated - BAFTA Award for Best Film Not in the English Language; Saudi Arabian entry for the Academy Award for Best Foreign Language Film |
| October 12, 2013 | The Armstrong Lie | Worldwide | Nominated - BAFTA Award for Best Documentary |
| October 16, 2013 | Kill Your Darlings | U.S., Australia, New Zealand, South Africa, African television and Eastern Europe | |
| December 20, 2013 | The Past | All rights excluding airlines in the U.S., Canada, Eastern Europe, the Baltics and the CIS | National Board of Review Award for Best Foreign Language Film; Nominated - César Award for Best Film; Nominated - Palme d'Or; Iranian entry for the Academy Award for Best Foreign Language Film |
| December 25, 2013 | The Invisible Woman | North and Latin America, Eastern Europe, the CIS, France, Germany, Austria, Switzerland, Italy, South Africa, Spain and Asia | |
| January 31, 2014 | Tim's Vermeer | Worldwide | |
| February 28, 2014 | The Lunchbox | U.S. and Canada | Filmfare Critics Award for Best Film; Nominated - BAFTA Award for Best Film Not in the English Language |
| March 21, 2014 | Jodorowsky's Dune | U.S. and Canada | |
| March 28, 2014 | The Raid 2 | U.S., Latin America and Spain | co-distributed with Stage 6 Films |
| April 11, 2014 | Only Lovers Left Alive | U.S. and Canada excluding airlines | Nominated - Palme d'Or |
| April 25, 2014 | For No Good Reason | U.S. and Canada | |
| June 20, 2014 | Third Person | U.S., U.K., Ireland, Germany, Austria, Switzerland and Scandinavia | |
| July 11, 2014 | Land Ho! | Worldwide | |
| July 25, 2014 | Magic in the Moonlight | U.S. and Canada | |
| August 22, 2014 | Love Is Strange | All rights excluding international airlines in U.S., Canada, Germany, Austria and Scandinavia | Nominated - Independent Spirit Award for Best Film |
| August 29, 2014 | The Notebook | U.S. and Canada | Shortlisted - Academy Award for Best Foreign Language Film |
| October 10, 2014 | Whiplash | U.S. and Canada | Grand Jury Prize Dramatic; Nominated - Academy Award for Best Picture; Nominated - Critics' Choice Movie Award for Best Picture; Nominated - Independent Spirit Award for Best Feature; Nominated - Producers Guild of America Award for Best Theatrical Motion Picture; Nominated - Queer Palm |
| November 14, 2014 | Foxcatcher | North and Latin America, Scandinavia, Eastern Europe, the Baltics and South Africa | Nominated - Golden Globe Award for Best Motion Picture – Drama; Nominated - Producers Guild of America Award for Best Theatrical Motion Picture |
| December 19, 2014 | Mr. Turner | North and Latin America, Eastern Europe and the CIS | Nominated - Palme d'Or |
| December 25, 2014 | Leviathan | U.S. and Canada | Golden Globe Award for Best Foreign Film; Nominated - Academy Award for Best Foreign Language Film; Nominated - BAFTA Award for Best Film Not in the English Language; Nominated - European Film Award for Best Film; Nominated - Independent Spirit Award for Best International Film; Nominated - Nika Award for Best Film of the CIS and Baltic States; Nominated - Palme d'Or |
| January 16, 2015 | Still Alice | U.S., Canada, France, Eastern Europe, the Baltics, the CIS, Portugal and India | |
| January 23, 2015 | Red Army | U.S., Canada, Eastern Europe and Asia | |
| February 20, 2015 | Wild Tales | All rights excluding airlines in U.S., Canada, Australia and New Zealand | BAFTA Award for Best Film Not in the English Language; Goya Award for Best Ibero-American Film; National Board of Review Award for Best Foreign Language Film; Nominated - Academy Award for Best Foreign Language Film; Nominated - David di Donatello for Best European Film; Nominated - Goya Award for Best Film |
| March 27, 2015 | The Salt of the Earth | U.S. | César Award for Best Documentary Film; Un Certain Regard Special Jury Prize; Nominated - Academy Award for Best Documentary Feature Film; Nominated - David di Donatello for Best Foreign Film; Nominated - Goya Award for Best European Film; Nominated - Independent Spirit Award for Best Documentary Feature; Nominated - Prix Un Certain Regard |
| April 3, 2015 | Lambert & Stamp | U.S., Canada, Australia, New Zealand, Eastern Europe, the CIS and Asia | |
| May 8, 2015 | Saint Laurent | U.S. and Canada | Nominated - Cesar Award for Best Film; Nominated - Palme d'Or; French entry for the Academy Award for Best Foreign Language Film |
| May 22, 2015 | Aloft | U.S. and Latin America | Nominated - Golden Bear |
| June 5, 2015 | Testament of Youth | North and Latin America, Germany, Austria, Switzerland, Spain, Eastern Europe and Asia excluding Korea | |
| June 19, 2015 | Infinitely Polar Bear | U.S., Canada, the U.K., Ireland, Germany, Austria, Switzerland, Scandinavia, Eastern Europe, the Baltics, the CIS and Asia excluding Hong Kong and Korea | |
| July 3, 2015 | Jimmy's Hall | U.S. and Canada | Nominated - Palme d'Or |
| July 17, 2015 | Irrational Man | U.S. and Canada | |
| August 7, 2015 | The Diary of a Teenage Girl | Worldwide excluding the U.K., Ireland, the Benelux and Portugal | |
| August 21, 2015 | Grandma | Worldwide | Nominated - GLAAD Media Award for Outstanding Film - Wide Release |
| September 9, 2015 | Coming Home | North and Latin America, Australia and New Zealand | |
| September 30, 2015 | Labyrinth of Lies | U.S. and Canada | Nominated - German Film Award for Best Fiction Film; Shortlisted - Academy Award for Best Foreign Language Film |
| October 16, 2015 | Truth | U.S. | |
| November 14, 2015 | Merchants of Doubt | Worldwide | Nominated - Producers Guild of America Award for Best Documentary Motion Picture |
| December 4, 2015 | The Lady in the Van | U.S. and Canada | one-week awards-qualifying run; limited release on January 15, 2016 |
| December 18, 2015 | Son of Saul | North and Latin America, Germany, Austria, Australia and New Zealand | Academy Award for Best Foreign Language Film; BAFTA Award for Best Film Not in the English Language; David di Donatello for Best European Film; Golden Globe Award for Best Foreign Language Film; Grand Prix (Cannes Film Festival); Independent Spirit Award for Best International Film; National Board of Review Award for Best Foreign Language Film; Nominated - Palme d'Or |
| March 18, 2016 | The Bronze | Worldwide | co-distributed with Stage 6 Films |
| March 25, 2016 | I Saw the Light | Worldwide | |
| April 1, 2016 | Miles Ahead | Worldwide excluding the U.K., Ireland, Switzerland, the Middle East, Israel, Hong Kong, Taiwan, Korea, Portugal and former Yugoslavia | |
| April 22, 2016 | The Meddler | Worldwide | co-production with Stage 6 Films and Anonymous Content |
| May 6, 2016 | Dark Horse | U.S. and Canada | |
| May 20, 2016 | Maggie's Plan | All rights excluding airlines and Eastern European television in North and Latin America, the U.K., Ireland, Australia, New Zealand, South Africa, Spain, Italy, Scandinavia, Hungary, Romania, the CIS, China, Thailand, the Philippines, Singapore and Vietnam | |
| June 24, 2016 | Eat That Question | Worldwide | |
| July 8, 2016 | Our Little Sister | U.S. and Canada | Japan Academy Film Prize for Picture of the Year; Nominated - Palme d'Or |
| July 29, 2016 | Equity | Worldwide | Nominated - Grand Jury Prize Dramatic |
| August 26, 2016 | The Hollars | Worldwide excluding Australia, New Zealand and Singapore | |
| November 2, 2016 | The Eagle Huntress | North and Latin America, Scandinavia, Australia, New Zealand, Germany, Austria and Asia | Nominated - BAFTA Award for Best Documentary |
| November 11, 2016 | Elle | North and Latin America, Australia, New Zealand, Scandinavia, Eastern Europe and Asia excluding China and Japan | César Award for Best Film; Golden Globe Award for Best Foreign Language Film; Nominated - BAFTA Award for Best Film Not in the English Language; Nominated - David di Donatello for Best European Film; Nominated - European Film Award for Best Film; Nominated - Palme d'Or; French entry for the Academy Award for Best Foreign Language Film |
| December 9, 2016 | The Comedian | U.S. and Canada | |
| December 21, 2016 | Julieta | U.S. and Canada | Nominated - BAFTA Award for Best Film Not in the English Language; Nominated - European Film Award for Best Film; Nominated - Goya Award for Best Film; Spanish entry for the Academy Award for Best Foreign Language Film |
| December 25, 2016 | Toni Erdmann | North and Latin America | European Film Award for Best Film; Independent Spirit Award for Best International Film; Nominated - Academy Award for Best Foreign Language Film; Nominated - BAFTA Award for Best Film Not in the English Language; Nominated - César Award for Best Foreign Film; Nominated - Golden Globe Award for Best Foreign Language Film; Nominated - Palme d'Or |
| January 20, 2017 | The Red Turtle | North and Latin America | Annie Award for Best Animated Feature - Independent; Un Certain Regard Special Jury Prize; Nominated - Academy Award for Best Animated Feature; Nominated - Prix Un Certain Regard |
| February 10, 2017 | Land of Mine | North and Latin America, Eastern Europe, the Baltics, the CIS, Portugal, Greece and Cyprus | Released in association with RatPac Entertainment; Bodil Award for Best Danish Film; Nominated - Academy Award for Best Foreign Language Film |
| April 14, 2017 | Norman | North and Hispanic America, the U.K., Ireland, France, the Benelux, Germany, Austria, Switzerland, Scandinavia, Eastern Europe, the Baltics, the CIS, South Africa and Asia excluding Korea | |
| May 12, 2017 | Paris Can Wait | All rights excluding airlines in U.S., Canada, the U.K., Ireland and the Benelux | |
| June 16, 2017 | Maudie | All rights excluding airlines in the U.S., Latin America, the U.K., Ireland, Greece, Cyprus, Italy, Portugal, Scandinavia, Turkey, South Africa, the CIS, Hungary, the Czech Republic, Slovakia, Romania, Bulgaria and Asia excluding Japan and Korea | Genie Award for Best Motion Picture |
| June 30, 2017 | 13 Minutes | North and Latin America | |
| July 28, 2017 | Brigsby Bear | Worldwide | Nominated - Grand Jury Prize Dramatic |
| September 29, 2017 | Mark Felt: The Man Who Brought Down the White House | U.S. and Canada | |
| October 27, 2017 | Novitiate | Worldwide | Nominated - Grand Jury Prize Dramatic |
| November 24, 2017 | Call Me by Your Name | Worldwide | Nominated - Academy Award for Best Picture; Nominated - BAFTA Award for Best Film; Nominated - David di Donatello for Best Film; Nominated - Golden Globe Award for Best Motion Picture – Drama; Nominated - Independent Spirit Award for Best Feature; Nominated - Producers Guild of America Award for Best Theatrical Motion Picture |
| December 22, 2017 | Happy End | North and Latin America | Austrian entry for the Academy Award for Best Foreign Language Film |
| December 29, 2017 | Film Stars Don't Die in Liverpool | U.S., Canada, Germany, Austria, Eastern Europe and pan-Asian pay television | |
| February 2, 2018 | A Fantastic Woman | U.S., Canada, Australia and New Zealand | Academy Award for Best Foreign Language Film; Goya Award for Best Ibero-American Film; Independent Spirit Award for Best International Film; Teddy Award; Nominated - Golden Bear; Nominated - Golden Globe Award for Best Foreign Language Film |
| February 16, 2018 | Loveless | North and Latin America | César Award for Best Foreign Film; Jury Prize (Cannes Film Festival); Nominated - Academy Award for Best Foreign Language Film; Nominated - BAFTA Award for Best Film Not in the English Language; Nominated - David di Donatello for Best Foreign Film; Nominated - European Film Award for Best Film; Nominated - Golden Globe Award for Best Foreign Language Film; Nominated - Independent Spirit Award for Best International Film; Nominated - Nika Award for Best Picture; Nominated - Palme d'Or |
| March 2, 2018 | Foxtrot | North and Latin America and Scandinavia | National Board of Review Award for Best Foreign Language Film; Nominated - Golden Lion; Shortlisted - Academy Award for Best Foreign Language Film |
| March 9, 2018 | The Leisure Seeker | Worldwide excluding Canada, Australia, New Zealand, the U.K., Ireland, France, Germany, Austria, Switzerland, Italy, Spain, the Benelux, Greece, Cyprus, the Nordics, the Middle East, Israel, Turkey, Taiwan, Singapore, Japan and airlines | Nominated - Golden Lion |
| March 23, 2018 | Final Portrait | North and Latin America and Eastern Europe | |
| April 13, 2018 | The Rider | All rights excluding airlines in North and Latin America, Asia, Australia, New Zealand, Eastern Europe, the Baltics and the CIS | Nominated - Independent Spirit Award for Best Feature |
| May 11, 2018 | The Seagull | Worldwide excluding the U.K., Ireland, Australia, New Zealand, France, Italy, Spain, the Benelux, Portugal, Russia, the Middle East, Israel, Iceland, Turkey, China, Korea and Japan | |
| June 22, 2018 | Boundaries | Worldwide | |
| July 27, 2018 | Puzzle | Worldwide | |
| August 17, 2018 | The Wife | All rights excluding airlines in the U.S., Canada and Eastern Europe | |
| September 14, 2018 | American Chaos | Worldwide | |
| October 10, 2018 | The Happy Prince | North and Latin America, Scandinavia, the Baltics, the CIS, Poland, Hungary, the Czech Republic, Slovakia, Romania, Bulgaria and Asia | Nominated - Golden Bear; Nominated - Teddy Award |
| November 2, 2018 | Maria by Callas | U.S., Canada, Australia and New Zealand | |
| December 14, 2018 | Capernaum | North and Latin America and South Africa | Nominated - Academy Award for Best Foreign Language Film; Nominated - BAFTA Award for Best Film Not in the English Language; Nominated - Cesar Award for Best Foreign Film; Nominated - Golden Globe Award for Best Foreign Language Film; Nominated - Palme d'Or |
| December 28, 2018 | Stan & Ollie | All rights excluding airlines in the U.S., Latin America, Eastern Europe, the CIS, China and South Africa | Nominated - BAFTA Award for Outstanding British Film |
| January 25, 2019 | Never Look Away | North and Latin America, Australia, New Zealand and Scandinavia | Nominated - Academy Award for Best Foreign Language Film; Nominated - Golden Globe Award for Best Foreign Language Film; Nominated - Golden Lion |
| February 15, 2019 | Ruben Brandt, Collector | North and Latin America | |
| March 22, 2019 | Sunset | U.S., Canada, Australia and New Zealand | Nominated - Golden Lion |
| April 26, 2019 | The White Crow | Worldwide excluding the U.K., Ireland, Australia, New Zealand, South Africa, France, Germany, Austria, Switzerland, Italy, Spain, Portugal, Greece, Cyprus, former Yugoslavia, the Baltics, the CIS, the Middle East, Israel, Iceland, Turkey, China, Japan and Singapore | |
| May 10, 2019 | All Is True | Worldwide | |
| May 31, 2019 | The Fall of the American Empire | U.S., Latin America, Australia and New Zealand | |
| June 28, 2019 | Maiden | U.S., Canada, the Middle East, Israel, South Africa, Scandinavia, the Benelux, India and worldwide airlines | Critics' Choice Documentary Award for Best Sports Documentary; National Board of Review Award for Best Documentary Film; Nominated - Critics' Choice Documentary Award for Best Archival Documentary; Nominated - Critics' Choice Documentary Award for Best Documentary Feature |
| July 19, 2019 | David Crosby: Remember My Name | North and Latin America, Australia, New Zealand, South Africa, the Middle East, Israel, Turkey, the Benelux, Scandinavia and Asia | Nominated - Critics' Choice Documentary Award for Best Biographical Documentary; Nominated - Critics' Choice Documentary Award for Best Music Documentary; Nominated - Grammy Award for Best Music Film |
| August 9, 2019 | After the Wedding | U.S., Canada, France, India, Indonesia, Thailand, Malaysia and Vietnam | |
| August 16, 2019 | Aquarela | North and Latin America, Australia, New Zealand, South Africa, Scandinavia and India | Nominated - Critics' Choice Documentary Award for Best Science/Nature Documentary |
| September 20, 2019 | Where's My Roy Cohn? | North and Latin America, Australia, New Zealand, South Africa, the Middle East, Israel, Turkey, the Benelux, Scandinavia, Asia and worldwide airlines and ships | |
| October 4, 2019 | Pain and Glory | U.S. and Canada | Goya Award for Best Film; Nominated - Academy Award for Best International Feature Film; Nominated - BAFTA Award for Best Film Not in the English Language; Nominated - César Award for Best Foreign Film; Nominated - Critics' Choice Movie Award for Best Foreign Language Film; Nominated - European Film Award for Best Film; Nominated - GLAAD Media Award for Outstanding Film - Limited Release; Nominated - Golden Globe Award for Best Foreign Language Film; Nominated - Palme d'Or; Nominated - Queer Palm |
| October 25, 2019 | Frankie | U.S., Canada, Eastern Europe, the Baltics, the CIS, Scandinavia, the Middle East, South Africa, Spain, India and worldwide airlines | Nominated - Palme d'Or; Nominated - Queer Palm |
| December 25, 2019 | The Song of Names | All rights excluding airlines and ships in the U.S., Australia, New Zealand, Latin America, South Africa, the Benelux, Scandinavia, Portugal, Korea, China, Hong Kong, Taiwan, India, Indonesia, Malaysia, the Philippines, Thailand, Vietnam and pan-Asian pay television | |

== 2020s ==
| Release date | Title | Market(s) | Notes |
|---|---|---|---|
| January 31, 2020 | The Traitor | North and Latin America, Australia, New Zealand and Scandinavia | David di Donatello for Best Film; Nominated - César Award for Best Foreign Film; Nominated - European Film Award for Best Film; Nominated - Palme d'Or; Italian entry for the Academy Award for Best Foreign Language Film |
| February 28, 2020 | Greed | U.S. and Canada | |
| March 6, 2020 | The Burnt Orange Heresy | All rights excluding airlines in North and Latin America, the U.K., Ireland, Australia, New Zealand, South Africa, Germany, Austria, Switzerland, Italy and Thailand | |
| November 13, 2020 | The Climb | Worldwide excluding France, Germany, Austria and Switzerland | Nominated - Prix Un Certain Regard |
| December 4, 2020 | I Carry You with Me | Worldwide | co-distributed with Stage 6 Films one week awards-qualifying run; limited release on June 25, 2021; Nominated - GLAAD Media Award for Outstanding Film - Limited Release |
| December 18, 2020 | The Father | All rights excluding airlines in the U.S., Eastern Europe, Thailand, Indonesia, Malaysia, the Philippines and Vietnam | one week awards-qualifying run; limited release on February 26, 2021, expanded nationwide on March 12, 2021; César Award for Best Foreign Film; Goya Award for Best European Film; Nominated - Academy Award for Best Picture; Nominated - BAFTA Award for Best Film; Nominated - BAFTA Award for Outstanding British Film; Nominated - European Film Award for Best Film; Nominated - Golden Globe Award for Best Motion Picture - Drama |
| December 25, 2020 | The Truffle Hunters | Worldwide | one week awards-qualifying run; limited release in New York and Los Angeles on March 5, 2021; Nominated - Bodil Award for Best Non-American Film; Nominated - World Cinema Documentary Grand Jury Prize |
| January 22, 2021 | The Human Factor | U.S., Canada, Australia, New Zealand, South Africa, Scandinavia, the Benelux, Asia and worldwide airlines | |
| February 12, 2021 | French Exit | Worldwide excluding Canada and Switzerland, and worldwide airlines | |
| March 12, 2021 | The Human Voice | U.S. and Canada | |
| June 11, 2021 | 12 Mighty Orphans | Worldwide | |
| July 30, 2021 | Nine Days | Worldwide | Nominated - Grand Jury Prize Dramatic |
| August 13, 2021 | The Lost Leonardo | Worldwide excluding the U.K., Ireland, France, Germany, Austria and Switzerland | Nominated - Bodil Award for Best Documentary; Nominated - Critics' Choice Documentary Award for Best Documentary Feature |
| November 12, 2021 | Julia | Worldwide excluding U.S. television | Nominated - Critics' Choice Documentary Award for Best Biographical Documentary |
| November 17, 2021 | Mothering Sunday | North and Latin America, the Middle East, Turkey, Eastern Europe, Asia excluding Japan, and worldwide airlines and ships | one week awards-qualifying run; limited release in New York and Los Angeles on March 25, 2022 |
| November 19, 2021 | Compartment No. 6 | Worldwide excluding Australia, New Zealand, South Africa, Europe, the CIS, Israel, China, Japan and Korea | one week awards-qualifying run; limited release on January 26, 2022; Grand Prix (Cannes Film Festival); Nominated - European Film Award for Best Film; Nominated - Golden Globe Award for Best Foreign Language Film; Nominated - Independent Spirit Award for Best International Film; Nominated - Palme d'Or; Nominated - Queer Palm |
| December 10, 2021 | The Duke | Worldwide excluding Canada, the U.K., Ireland, Australia, New Zealand, France, Germany, Austria, Switzerland, Italy, Spain, Poland, the Czech Republic, former Yugoslavia, the Benelux, the Middle East, Israel, China and Japan | one-week awards-qualifying run; limited release on April 22, 2022 |
| December 24, 2021 | Parallel Mothers | U.S., Canada, Australia and New Zealand | limited theatrical release; expanded nationwide on January 28, 2022; GLAAD Media Award for Outstanding Film - Limited Release; Nominated - BAFTA Award for Best Film Not in the English Language; Nominated - César Award for Best Foreign Film; Nominated - Golden Globe Award for Best Foreign Language Film; Nominated - Golden Lion; Nominated - Goya Award for Best Film; Nominated - Independent Spirit Award for Best International Film; Nominated - Queer Lion |
| December 29, 2021 | Jockey | Worldwide | Nominated - Grand Jury Prize Dramatic |
| January 14, 2022 | Who We Are: A Chronicle of Racism in America | Worldwide | |
| May 13, 2022 | Jazz Fest: A New Orleans Story | Worldwide | |
| June 3, 2022 | The Phantom of the Open | U.S., Canada, France, China, Hong Kong, Japan, Korea, Thailand, Malaysia, Singapore, the Philippines and Vietnam | |
| July 1, 2022 | Hallelujah: Leonard Cohen, A Journey, A Song | Worldwide excluding France, Germany and Austria | |
| October 21, 2022 | The Return of Tanya Tucker: Featuring Brandi Carlile | Worldwide | |
| November 4, 2022 | Salvatore: Shoemaker of Dreams | Worldwide excluding Italy | |
| November 25, 2022 | The Son | All rights excluding airlines in the U.S., Eastern Europe, the Baltics, Turkey and Asia excluding Japan and Korea | one-week awards-qualifying run; limited release on January 20, 2023 |
| December 2, 2022 | Return to Seoul | North and Latin America, Australia, New Zealand, the Middle East and Israel | one-week awards-qualifying run; limited release on February 17, 2023; Nominated - Independent Spirit Award for Best International Film; Nominated - Prix Un Certain Regard |
| December 9, 2022 | One Fine Morning | North and Latin America and the Middle East | one-week awards-qualifying run; limited release on January 27, 2023 |
| December 23, 2022 | Living | North and Latin America, Scandinavia, Eastern Europe, the Baltics, the CIS, Germany, Austria, South Africa, Asia excluding Japan and Korea, and worldwide airlines | Nominated - BAFTA Award for Outstanding British Film |
| December 30, 2022 | Turn Every Page: The Adventures of Robert Caro and Robert Gottlieb | Worldwide | |
| April 21, 2023 | Carmen | North and Latin America, Scandinavia, Eastern Europe, the CIS, the Middle East and Israel | |
| May 12, 2023 | It Ain't Over | Worldwide | |
| July 14, 2023 | The Miracle Club | All rights excluding airlines in the U.S., Latin America, the Czech Republic, Slovakia, Romania, Bulgaria, former Yugoslavia, Turkey and Asia excluding Japan, Korea and Singapore | |
| July 21, 2023 | Velvet Goldmine | U.S. and select international territories including Canada, France, Germany, Austria, Switzerland, Spain, Italy, Eastern Europe, the Benelux, the Middle East, Israel, Turkey, Greece, Cyprus, Portugal, South Africa and India | 25th anniversary re-release at the Alamo Drafthouse Cinema; originally distributed by Miramax Films |
| August 4, 2023 | Shortcomings | Worldwide | Nominated - GLAAD Media Award for Outstanding Film - Wide Release; Nominated - Grand Jury Prize Dramatic |
| September 29, 2023 | Carlos | Worldwide | co-distributed with Trafalgar Releasing |
| October 6, 2023 | Strange Way of Life | Worldwide excluding the U.K., Ireland, France, the Benelux, Switzerland, Spain, Italy and Latin America | Nominated - Queer Palm - Short Film |
| October 20, 2023 | The Persian Version | Worldwide | co-distributed with Stage 6 Films; Nominated - Grand Jury Prize Dramatic |
| November 24, 2023 | They Shot the Piano Player | Worldwide excluding the U.K., Ireland, Australia, New Zealand, South Africa, France, Germany, Austria, Switzerland, Italy, Spain, the Benelux, Portugal, Iceland, Greece, Cyprus, Eastern Europe, the Baltics, the CIS, Japan, Taiwan and Korea, and airlines within aforementioned territories | one-week awards-qualifying run; limited release on February 23, 2024; Nominated - European Film Award for Best Animated Feature Film; Nominated - Goya Award for Best Animated Film |
| December 1, 2023 | Shayda | North and Latin America, the Middle East, Israel, Turkey, Eastern Europe, the Baltics, the CIS, the Benelux and Portugal | one-week awards-qualifying run; limited release on March 1, 2024; Nominated - AACTA Award for Best Film; Nominated - World Cinema Dramatic Grand Jury Prize; Australian entry for the Academy Award for Best International Feature Film |
| December 8, 2023 | The Peasants | North and Latin America, Australia, New Zealand, the Middle East and Israel | limited one week engagement; limited release on January 26, 2024; Nominated - Polish Academy Award for Best Film |
| December 22, 2023 | Freud's Last Session | Worldwide excluding the U.K., Ireland, Australia, New Zealand, South Africa, France, Germany, Austria, Switzerland, Italy, Spain, the Benelux, Portugal, the Nordics, Greece, Cyprus, the Baltics, the CIS, Israel, China, Korea and Japan, and worldwide airlines | limited release in New York and Los Angeles; expanded nationwide on January 19, 2024 |
| December 25, 2023 | The Teachers' Lounge | North and Latin America, Poland, the Czech Republic, Slovakia, Romania, Bulgaria, former Yugoslavia and the Baltics | German Film Award for Best Fiction Film; Nominated - Academy Award for Best International Feature Film; Nominated - Bodil Award for Best Non-American Film; Nominated - Goya Award for Best European Film |
| February 14, 2024 | Amélie | U.S. and English-speaking Canada | U.S. re-release; originally distributed by Miramax Zoë; César Award for Best Film; European Film Award for Best Film; Toronto International Film Festival People's Choice Award; Nominated - Academy Award for Best Foreign Language Film; Nominated - BAFTA Award for Best Film; Nominated - BAFTA Award for Best Film Not in the English Language; Nominated - Golden Globe Award for Best Foreign Language Film |
| March 29, 2024 | Wicked Little Letters | U.S., Canada and China | |
| April 19, 2024 | We Grown Now | Worldwide | co-distributed with Stage 6 Films; Nominated - Independent Spirit Award for Best Film |
| June 18, 2024 | Shotgun Stories | U.S. and Canada | home media release; originally distributed by International Film Circuit |
| June 28, 2024 | Daddio | North and Latin America, Australia, New Zealand, South Africa, Spain, the Benelux, Scandinavia, Eastern Europe, India and Southeast Asia | |
| August 2, 2024 | Kneecap | All rights excluding airlines in North and Latin America, Eastern Europe, the Baltics, the Middle East and Turkey | Nominated - BAFTA Award for Best Film Not in the English Language; Nominated - BAFTA Award for Outstanding British Film; Nominated - Critics' Choice Movie Award for Best Foreign Language Film |
| August 23, 2024 | Between the Temples | Worldwide | Nominated - Grand Jury Prize Dramatic |
| October 4, 2024 | The Outrun | Worldwide excluding the U.K., Ireland, France, Germany, Austria, Switzerland and the Benelux | co-distributed with Stage 6 Films; Nominated - BAFTA Award for Outstanding British Film |
| November 20, 2024 | I'm Still Here | North and Hispanic America, the Middle East, Turkey, Eastern Europe, the Baltics, Portugal, Australia and New Zealand | one-week awards-qualifying run in New York and Los Angeles; limited release in New York and Los Angeles on January 17, 2025, and expanded nationwide on February 14; Academy Award for Best International Feature Film; Nominated - Academy Award for Best Picture; Nominated - BAFTA Award for Best Film Not in the English Language; Nominated - Critics' Choice Movie Award for Best Foreign Language Film; Nominated - Golden Globe Award for Best Foreign Language Film; Nominated - Golden Lion; Nominated - Goya Award for Best Iberoamerican Film |
| December 20, 2024 | The Room Next Door | U.S., Canada, Australia, New Zealand, South Africa, the Middle East and India | limited release in New York and Los Angeles; expanded to select cities on January 10, and opened nationwide on January 17; Golden Lion; Nominated - European Film Award for Best Film |
| February 7, 2025 | Becoming Led Zeppelin | Worldwide excluding Australia, New Zealand, Portugal, Italy, Scandinavia, the Baltics and Japan | limited IMAX run; expanded nationwide on February 14 |
| March 28, 2025 | The Penguin Lessons | U.S., Canada, the Middle East, Turkey and Asia | |
| April 25, 2025 | On Swift Horses | North and Latin America, the U.K., Ireland, Australia, New Zealand, Italy, Scandinavia, Eastern Europe, India, Southeast Asia and Turkey | Nominated - GLAAD Media Award for Outstanding Film - Wide Release |
| May 23, 2025 | Jane Austen Wrecked My Life | North and Latin America, the Middle East, Israel, Eastern Europe and worldwide airlines | limited release; expanded nationwide on May 30 |
| July 11, 2025 | Don't Let's Go to the Dogs Tonight | Worldwide | limited release in New York and Los Angeles; expanded nationwide on July 18 |
| July 25, 2025 | Oh, Hi! | Worldwide | |
| August 15, 2025 | East of Wall | Worldwide | |
| September 26, 2025 | Eleanor the Great | Worldwide | co-distribution with TriStar Pictures |
| October 17, 2025 | Blue Moon | Worldwide | limited release in New York and Los Angeles; expanded nationwide on October 24; Nominated - Golden Bear; Nominated - Golden Globe Award for Best Motion Picture - Musical or Comedy; Nominated - GLAAD Media Award for Outstanding Film - Wide Release |
| November 7, 2025 | Nuremberg | U.S., Canada and worldwide airlines | |
| November 11, 2025 | La Femme Nikita | U.S. and Canada | reissued as part of the Luc Besson Collection Blu-ray set; originally distributed by the Samuel Goldwyn Company |
| November 11, 2025 | Atlantis | U.S. and Canada | reissued as part of the Luc Besson Collection Blu-ray set |
| November 11, 2025 | Subway | U.S. and Canada | reissued as part of the Luc Besson Collection Blu-ray set; originally distributed by Island Pictures |
| November 11, 2025 | The Big Blue | U.S. and Canada | reissued as part of the Luc Besson Collection Blu-ray set; originally distributed by Weintraub Entertainment Group and Columbia Pictures |
| November 11, 2025 | Le Dernier Combat | U.S. and Canada | reissued as part of the Luc Besson Collection Blu-ray set; originally distributed by Triumph Films |
| November 21, 2025 | A Magnificent Life | North and Latin America, the Middle East, Israel, Scandinavia, India, Italy and worldwide airlines and ships | one-week awards-qualifying run in New York and Los Angeles; limited release on March 27, 2026 |
| December 5, 2025 | Merrily We Roll Along | Worldwide | co-distributed by Fathom Entertainment; Tony Award for Best Revival of a Musical |
| December 5, 2025 | A Private Life | North and Latin America | one-week awards-qualifying run in New York and Los Angeles; limited release in New York and Los Angeles on January 16, 2026 |
| December 12, 2025 | The President's Cake | North and Latin America, Eastern Europe, the Baltics, India and Southeast Asia | Caméra d'Or; Shortlisted - Academy Award for Best International Feature Film one-week awards-qualifying run in New York and Los Angeles; limited release on February 6, 2026; expanded nationwide on February 27 |
| December 12, 2025 | Scarlet | U.S. and Canada | one-week awards-qualifying run in IMAX December 12, 2025 in ten cities; limited release on IMAX screens in select cities for one-week on February 6, 2026; expanded nationwide on February 13 |
| December 25, 2025 | The Choral | Worldwide | limited release in New York and Los Angeles; expanded nationwide on January 16, 2026 |
| April 24, 2026 | I Swear | U.S., Latin America, Portugal, Poland, Hungary, Romania, Bulgaria, Turkey, Asia excluding India, and the CIS excluding Russia | Nominated - BAFTA Award for Outstanding British Film |
| June 5, 2026 | Trainspotting | Worldwide excluding the U.K., Ireland, Latin America and Japan | 30th anniversary re-release; originally distributed by Miramax Films; Bodil Award for Best Non-American Film; Nominated - BAFTA Award for Outstanding British Film; Nominated - Independent Spirit Award for Best Foreign Film |
| June 19, 2026 | Unidentified | North and Latin America, Australia, New Zealand, Eastern Europe, the Baltics, Turkey, the CIS excluding Russia, and worldwide airlines | |
| July 10, 2026 | Gail Daughtry and the Celebrity Sex Pass | Worldwide | |
| July 24, 2026 | The Piano | U.S. and English-speaking Canada | re-release; originally distributed by Miramax Films; AACTA Award for Best Film; Bodil Award for Best Non-American Film; César Award for Best Foreign Film; Independent Spirit Award for Best International Film; Palme d'Or (tied with Farewell My Concubine); Nominated - Academy Award for Best Picture; Nominated - BAFTA Award for Best Film; Nominated - Golden Globe Award for Best Motion Picture - Drama |
| September 25, 2026 | Ha-Chan, Shake Your Booty! | Worldwide | Nominated - Grand Jury Prize Dramatic |
| October 16, 2026 | The Only Living Pickpocket in New York | Worldwide | limited release in Los Angeles and New York City; expands nationwide on October 23 |
| November 13, 2026 | Bitter Christmas | U.S and Canada | limited release in Los Angeles and New York City; expands nationwide on November 25; Nominated - Palme d'Or; Nominated - Queer Palm |

== Upcoming ==
| Release date | Title | Market(s) | Notes |
|---|---|---|---|
| December 4, 2026 | Iron Boy | North and Latin America, India and Southeast Asian television | one-week awards-qualifying run; limited release in Los Angeles and New York City on January 22, 2027; Un Certain Regard Special Jury Prize; Annecy Jury Award; Nominated - Annecy Cristal Award for Best Film; Nominated - European Film Award for Best Animated Feature Film; Nominated - Prix Un Certain Regard |
| December 11, 2026 | Bedford Park | Worldwide | awards-qualifying run in Los Angeles and New York City; opens nationwide on March 5, 2027; U.S. Dramatic Special Jury Award for Debut Feature; Nominated - Grand Jury Prize Dramatic |
| December 11, 2026 | Bunker | U.S., Canada, Southeast Asia, and worldwide airlines excluding France | awards-qualifying run in Los Angeles and New York City; opens nationwide on January 15, 2027; Nominated - Golden Lion |
| December 2026 | Rehearsals for a Revolution | North and Latin America, the U.K., Ireland, Portugal, Turkey, Asia excluding Japan, and worldwide airlines | awards-qualifying run in Los Angeles and New York City; limited release in Los Angeles and New York City on January 8, 2027; U.K. entry for the Academy Award for Best International Feature Film; L'Œil d'or Nominated - Critics' Choice Documentary Award for Best Documentary Feature; Nominated - European Film Award for Best Documentary |
| February 12, 2027 | Wishful Thinking | Worldwide | South by Southwest Narrative Feature Competition Jury Award |

=== Undated films ===
| Release date | Title | Market(s) | Notes |
|---|---|---|---|
| 2027 | Diamond | Worldwide excluding France, Germany, Austria, Italy and the CIS | |
| 2027 | The Julia Set | Worldwide excluding Canada, Latin America, France, Germany, Austria, Greece, Cyprus, Portugal, Poland, former Yugoslavia, the Middle East, Turkey, the CIS, Singapore and airlines | |
| 2027 | Poetic License | Worldwide | |
| 2027 | A Statement | Worldwide | |
| 2027 | Violette | U.S., Latin America and Southeast Asia | |
| 2027 | A Winter's Journey | North and Latin America, Australia, New Zealand, South Africa, Scandinavia, the Middle East, Turkey, Asia and worldwide airlines | |

== See also ==
- Mongrel Media, the exclusive theatrical Canadian distributor for Sony Pictures Classics films
