= John Stratton (soccer) =

American U.S. Air Force officer and soccer player

John C. Stratton
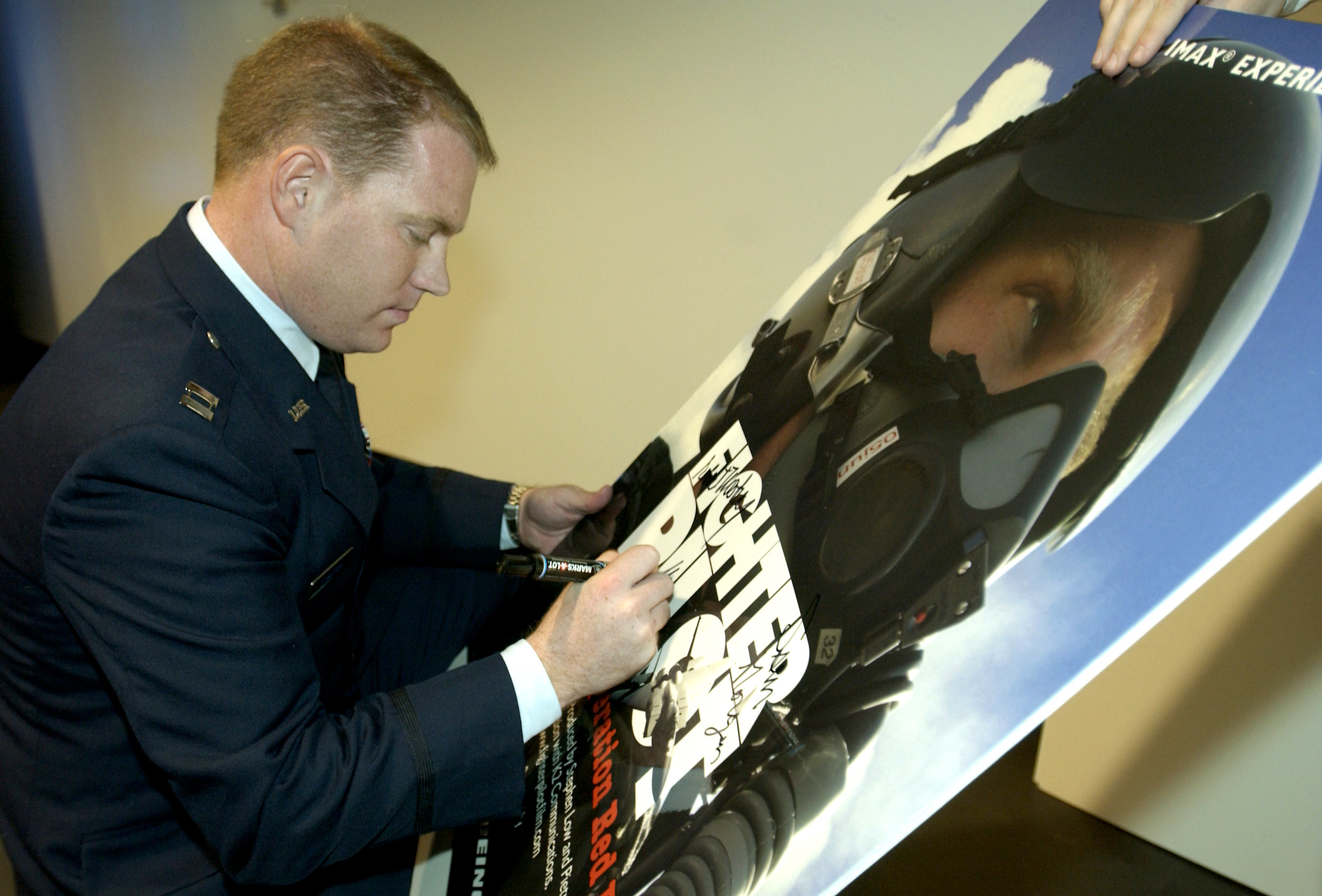
- Captain Stratton signing movie poster
- Born: Denver, Colorado
- Military career
- Allegiance: United States
- Branch: Air Force
- Rank: Colonel
- Conflicts: OIF, OSW, ONW, ONE
Association football career
- Position: Defender
Youth career
- 1993–1996: Air Force Academy
Senior career*
Years	Team	Apps	(Gls)
1997	Colorado Foxes		
- * Club domestic league appearances and goals

John C. Stratton is a former American soccer defender and retired U.S. Air Force officer and fighter pilot. He played one season of A-League soccer. Stratton also starred in the IMAX film Fighter Pilot: Operation Red Flag.

== Early life ==
Stratton was born in Denver, Colorado. He graduated from Horizon High School in Thornton, Colorado. He then attended the United States Air Force Academy, where he played on the men's soccer team from 1993 to 1996. He was a First Team All American his senior season. Stratton graduated in 1997 with a bachelor's degree in political science.

He spent the 1997 season with the Colorado Foxes, an A-League soccer team before attending Air Force flight training. Following his graduation from Air Force flight training in 1999, he embarked on a career as an F-15 pilot. Stratton retired from the U.S. Air Force in 2022 and went into the civilian sector as a Boeing 767 pilot for FedEx.

== Fighter Pilot film ==
Stratton was one of the three stars of the 2004 IMAX film Fighter Pilot: Operation Red Flag. The film documents Stratton's experience as an F-15 Eagle pilot at Red Flag, a United States Air Force combat training exercise held at Nellis Air Force Base in Nevada. The film follows Stratton for two weeks at the Red Flag exercise. According to the film's voice-over, many of the training scenarios at Red Flag are more complex and dangerous than actual combat. The film was premiered on 2 December 2004 at the National Air and Space Museum.
