= The Last Buffalo =

1990 IMAX film

The Last Buffalo is a 1990 IMAX film documenting the life of the Alberta Badlands, in and around the Red Deer River. The movie intersperses this footage with the steel sculptures of William Lishman, depicting the same cougars, buffalo, and the like. The film was produced for the Suntory pavilion at Expo '90. The movie is 27 minutes long and directed by Stephen Low.
