= Super Speedway =

1997 Canadian documentary film by Stephen Low

Super Speedway The IMAX Film
- Directed by: Stephen Low
- Story by: Alexander Low
- Produced by: Pietro L.Serapiglia
- Starring: Mario Andretti; Michael Andretti; Christian Fittipaldi
- Narrated by: Paul Newman
- Cinematography: Andrew Kitzanuk
- Edited by: James Lahti
- Music by: Gilles Ouellet
- Production company: Openwheel Productions
- Release date: 1997
- Running time: 50 minutes
- Countries: Canada; United States
- Language: English
- Budget: 7 Million USD

Super Speedway is a 1997 documentary racing film chronicling one man's quest to get his new Champ Car Lola chassis up to speed, and another's goal of rebuilding an old 1964 roadster once driven by the legendary Mario Andretti. The film was directed by renowned IMAX director Stephen Low and produced by Pietro Serapiglia. It was narrated by Paul Newman (who was himself an avid racer and co-owner of Newman/Haas Racing). It first premiered at IMAX theaters nationwide.

== Production ==
The film took over four years to shoot. The car was equipped with an IMAX camera and driven by Mario Andretti. Michael Andretti drove his teammate Christian Fittipaldi's car in the film. Mario reached speeds up to 240 mph at Michigan International Speedway at director Low's request. Newman/Haas Racing was the only team interested in the project in the technical world of Indy Car racing. The effort was spearheaded by Neil Richter, the team's director of finances.

The film features Mario and Michael Andretti during the 1996 season driving for Newman/Haas Racing. During the season, Michael Andretti won a season-high five races and finished 2nd in the championship to Jimmy Vasser. At the end of the film, Mario is reunited with his old roadster for a once-in-a-lifetime experience and can be seen driving it thru the countryside.
