= Stephen Low (filmmaker) =

Canadian IMAX and 3D filmmaker

- Born: 1950 (age 75–76); Ottawa, Ontario, Canada
- Education: Lakehead University
- Occupation: filmmaker
- Parent: Colin & Eugénie Low

Stephen Low (born 1950) is a Canadian film director and screenwriter who works extensively in the IMAX and IMAX 3D film formats. Based in Montreal, Quebec, over his 30-plus year career Low has directed numerous award-winning film documentaries including Challenger: An Industrial Romance (1980), Beavers (1988), Titanica (1991), Super Speedway (1997), Volcanoes of the Deep Sea (2003), Fighter Pilot: Operation Red Flag (2004), Ultimate Wave Tahiti 3D (2010), Legends of Flight 3D (2010), Rescue 3D (2011), Rocky Mountain Express (2011) and Aircraft Carrier (2017).

== Biography ==
The second son of National Film Board of Canada animator, documentary and IMAX filmmaker Colin Low, his eldest brother is Benjamin and his younger brother is Alexander, Stephen Low was born in Ottawa and raised in Montreal. In his youth he showed no interest in the family business although his varied interests — painting, photography, auto racing, aviation, scuba diving, trains, travel, history — would all eventually show up in his future films. "As a child," he recalls, "filmmaking seemed like extremely boring stuff. Everything just took forever." He moved to Thunder Bay, Ontario, where he studied political science at Lakehead University and also worked as a brakeman for the Canadian Pacific Railway.

Despite his childhood resistance to filmmaking, he began his directorial career with the National Film Board of Canada (NFB) around 1979 after four years spent in Newfoundland as a cameraman and editor. A brief dalliance with Hollywood filmmaking convinced him to stick with documentaries: "Hollywood plays with toys," he says, "they never get close to the real thing." Among his projects as a director at the NFB were Challenger: An Industrial Romance (1980), produced by Imax co-founder Roman Kroitor, and Next Generation (1982) (both films are about the Challenger aircraft), and The Defender (1988). He wrote a short film, Acting Classes (1980), directed by John N. Smith. He was hired by Kroitor to direct Skyward, his first IMAX film, which was released in 1985. Since then, Low has worked exclusively in IMAX and IMAX 3D. His diverse giant screen filmography reflects his fascination with the world at large as well as his ability to find an off-beat, interesting story in any subject. He says that, in fact, the most important thing he learned from his father had nothing to do with filmmaking techniques; it was "a fascination with everything. There are a lot of things out there that are really interesting and through filmmaking I could participate in them."

== Filmography (director) ==
- The Defender (1988)
- Next Generation (1982)
- Challenger: An Industrial Romance (1980)

=== IMAX and IMAX 3D ===
- Train Time (2022)
- Secrets of the Universe (2019)
- The Trolley (2018)
- Aircraft Carrier 3D (2017)
- Rocky Mountain Express (2011)
- Legends of Flight 3D (2010)
- Rescue 3D (2010)
- Ultimate Wave Tahiti 3D (2010)
- Fighter Pilot: Operation Red Flag (2004)
- Volcanoes of the Deep Sea (2003)
- Super Speedway (2000)
- Mark Twain's America (3D) (1998)
- Across the Sea of Time (3D) (1995)
- Titanica (1995)
- Flight of the Aquanaut (1993)
- The Last Buffalo (3D) (1990)
- Beavers (1988)
- Skyward (1985)

== The Stephen Low Company ==
The Stephen Low Company was established in 1985 and is based in Dorval, Quebec. The members of the SLC team include Pietro Serapiglia, producer and vice-president, distribution; Alexander Low, vice-president, development and marketing; and Dougal Caron, vice-president, finance. The company produced and distributes many of Low's films, including Beavers, Flight of the Aquanaut, Super Speedway, Volcanoes of the Deep Sea, and Rocky Mountain Express. In recent years, The Stephen Low Company has worked in partnership with executive producer and distributor K2 Communications to produce and distribute five films—Fighter Pilot: Operation Red Flag, Ultimate Wave Tahiti 3D, Rescue 3D, Legends of Flight 3D and Aircraft Carrier 3D.

== Honours ==
- Inducted as honorary member, Directors Guild of Canada (2012)
- Member of The Academy of Motion Picture Arts and Sciences —"Accepted for demonstrating exceptional accomplishments in the field of theatrical motion pictures." (2004–present).
- Kodak Vision Award, Lifetime Achievement; Large Format Cinema Association (LFCA), Los Angeles, California (2004)
- Alumni Honour Award, Lakehead University, Thunder Bay, Ontario (2005)
- Giant Screen Consortium Award – In honour of Stephen Low for his contribution to the Canadian Large Format Industry, Giant Screen Consortium, Canada (2002)

== Awards ==
- 2012 Best Film – Rocky Mountain Express – Giant Screen Cinema Association (GSCA), Sacramento, California
- 2012 Best Cinematography – Rocky Mountain Express – Giant Screen Cinema Association (GSCA), Sacramento, California
- 2012 Best Sound Editing: Special Venue – Rocky Mountain Express – MPSE Golden Reel Awards
- 2012 First Prize – Current Affairs – Rescue – 22nd International Military Film Festival, Bracciano, Italy
- 2011 Maximum Image Award – Titanica – IMAX Hall of Fame
- 2011 Best Aviation Photography Award - Fighter Pilot—Fly Film Festival. Poland
- 2011 Best Short Documentary – Legends of Flight – Skyfest, Asheville, North Carolina
- 2011 Golden Sheaf Award: Documentary Arts and Culture – Ultimate Wave Tahiti – Yorkton Film Festival, Yorkton, Saskatchewan
- 2011 Silver Palm Award – Legends of Flight - Mexico International Film Festival
- 2011 Bronze Palm Award – Ultimate Wave Tahiti - Mexico International Film Festival
- 2011 Jury Lycéen Award – Ultimate Wave Tahiti - Festival Les Toiles de Mer
- 2010 Golden Palm Award – Fighter Pilot – Mexico International Film Festival
- 2010 Best in Show – Fighter Pilot – Skyfest, Asheville, North Carolina
- 2010 Best Sports Category – Ultimate Wave Tahiti - Blue Ocean Film Festival, Savannah, Georgia
- 2010 Outstanding Achievement in Action Sports Filmmaking – Ultimate Wave Tahiti - Newport Beach Film Festival, Newport Beach, California
- 2009 Official Selection – Volcanoes of the Deep Sea – 6th Annual Montana CINE International Festival, Missoula, Montana
- 2009 Honorable Mention for Educational Value – Volcanoes of the Deep Sea - 6th Annual Montana CINE International Festival, Missoula, Montana
- 2009 International Finalist – Marine and Earth Sciences – Volcanoes of the Deep Sea - Blue Ocean Film Festival, Savannah, Georgia
- 2009 Honorable Mention – Ocean Exploration and Adventure – Volcanoes of the Deep Sea - Blue Ocean Film Festival, Savannah, Georgia
- 2009 Honorable Mention – Marine Animal Behavior - Volcanoes of the Deep Sea - Blue Ocean Film Festival, Savannah, Georgia
- 2009 Golden Wheel Award – Super Speedway – International Reel Wheel Film Festival, Knoxville, Iowa
- 2007 Best Scientific Exploration Film – Volcanoes of the Deep Sea – The Explorers Club Documentary Film Festival
- 2006 Golden Reel Award - for Outstanding Achievement in the Motion Picture and Television Industries – Fighter Pilot, Operation Red Flag – Motion Picture Sound Editors
- 2005 Lakehead University Alumni Honour Award
- 2005 Scientific Literacy Achievement Award – Volcanoes of the Deep Sea – Association for Biomedical Research
- 2004 Grand Prize – Best Film of the Year – Volcanoes of the Deep Sea – La Geode Film Festival, Paris
- 2004 Kodak Vision Award for Lifetime Achievement– Stephen Low – Giant Screen Theater Association
- 2004 Special Achievement in Film Award – Volcanoes of the Deep Sea - Giant Screen Theater Association
- 2004 Maximum Image Award (Hall of Fame Award) – Beavers – IMAX Corporation
- 2004 Member of The Academy of Motion Picture Arts and Science – Accepted for Having Demonstrated Exceptional Accomplishments in the Field of Theatrical Motion Pictures
- 2002 Giant Screen Consortium Award – In honour of Stephen Low for his contribution to the Canadian Large Format Industry
- 1999 Best Entertainment DVD – Super Speedway – European DVD Awards, Dublin Castle
- 1997 Northern Nevada Motion Picture Award – Mark Twain's America / Low Films International – 1997 Distinguished Business of Nevada
- 1993 Board of Directors IMAX Award for Best IMAX Film – Beavers – Hawaii International Film Festival
- 1993 Genie Award nomination for Best Feature Length Documentary – Titanica – Academy of Canadian Cinema and Television
- 1990 Gemini Award nomination for Best Writing in an Information / Documentary Program or Series – The Defender - Academy of Canadian Cinema and Television
- 1990 Gemini Award nomination for Best Director in an Information / Documentary Program or Series – The Defender - Academy of Canadian Cinema and Television
- 1990 Selected for Screening Certificate – The Defender – Red Deer International Airshow's 1990 International Aviation film/Video Festival
- 1989 Best Picture – The Defender – Golden Sheaf Awards, Yorkton Film Festival (Saskatchewan)
- 1989 Best Director - The Defender – Golden Sheaf Awards, Yorkton Film Festival (Saskatchewan)
- 1989 Best Script – The Defender - Golden Sheaf Awards, Yorkton Film Festival (Saskatchewan)
- 1989 Jury Prize for Best IMAX/OMNIMAX Film – Beavers – 2nd International Film Festival de la Geode, Paris
- 1989 Public Prize for Best IMAX/OMNIMAX Film – Beavers – 2nd International Film Festival de la Geode, Paris
- 1989 Super Channel Award – The Defender – Yorkton Short Film and Video Festival
- 1981 Best of Show – Challenger: An Industrial Romance – Cindy Competition / Audio Graphics Films and Information Film Producers of America (Cindys)
- 1981 Gold Cindy Award - Challenger: An Industrial Romance – Information Film Producers of America (Cindys)
- 1981 Gold Camera Award (for outstanding creativity in the production of audio/visual communications in international competition) - Challenger: An Industrial Romance – US Industrial Film Festival
- 1981 The Chris Award - Challenger: An Industrial Romance – 29th Annual Columbus Film Festival
- 1980 Silver Award – Challenger: An Industrial Romance – San Francisco International Film Festival
