= Fighter Pilot: Operation Red Flag =

2004 film by Stephen Low

- DVD cover
- Directed by: Stephen Low
- Written by: Stephen Low; Denny Kuhr; Joe Stanley
- Produced by: Stephen Low; Pietro L. Serapiglia; Michael Williams
- Starring: John Stratton; Robert Novotny; Sam Morgan
- Music by: Michel Cusson
- Production company: The Stephen Low Company
- Distributed by: K2 Communications
- Release date: 2004
- Running time: 49 minutes
- Country: Canada
- Language: English

Fighter Pilot: Operation Red Flag is an IMAX film centered on the experiences of a USAF F-15 Eagle fighter pilot, then-Captain John Stratton, who wants to be professionally successful as a fighter pilot. It chronicles his experience during USAF Red Flag training at Nellis AFB, a simulated air war designed to train pilots for combat. Directed by Stephen Low and presented by Boeing, the film shows how airmen simulate a war without killing one another, as well as the training of military air base firemen, military ordnance crews, midair refueling operations, cockpit views, and other aspects of aerial combat. The film was released in December 2004.

== War simulation ==
The exercise simulates an air war without firing actual weapons using NACTS (Nellis Air Combat Training System). The participating aircraft, carrying specialized telemetry pods or other equipment, send back telemetry information to computer, and when they have "fired," the computer figures out who is "hit." Color codes during computer replay debriefs offer a way of telling participants apart, with blue planes representing friendly forces and red planes representing enemy forces in the exercise.

== Reception ==
Fighter Pilot was met with mixed reviews. Robert Koehler of Variety gave the film an unfavorable review, saying, "Presumably, the greatest strength of an Imax format film about flying would be placing viewers in the cockpit and immersing eyes and ears in the total flight experience. Director Stephen Low is either unable or unwilling to do this." Bruce Westbook of the Houston Chronicle commented on his review that "the crisp military teams are inspiring, showing fierce dedication and camaraderie. Fighter Pilot should set minds at ease that businesslike experts defend our skies. But it plays more like a recruitment film than an eye-popping IMAX experience." The film is currently rated at 56% on Rotten Tomatoes.
