= Rocky Mountain Express =

- Theatrical release poster
- Directed by: Stephen Low
- Produced by: Pietro L. Serapiglia; Alexander Low
- Cinematography: Stephen Low
- Music by: Michel Cusson
- Distributed by: The Stephen Low Company
- Release date: September 30, 2011
- Running time: 47 minutes
- Country: Canada
- Language: English

Rocky Mountain Express is a 45-minute IMAX film released in the fall of 2011. Directed by Canadian filmmaker Stephen Low, it features the Canadian Pacific Railway’s restored 4-6-4 H1b Hudson steam locomotive 2816. Shooting began in 2006 and continued intermittently over the next five years, primarily on the main line between Calgary and Vancouver, with the cooperation of the CPR. The film was shot in 15 perforation/70 mm film, using a helicopter and gyro-stabilized camera mount as well as a variety of engine and train mounts.

The film takes the audience on a steam journey along the historic Canadian Pacific route from Vancouver to Montreal, focusing on the western mountain portion. In parallel, it tells the story of the construction of the first transcontinental railway to link the new Dominion of Canada from sea to sea and the massive effort required of a nation of fewer than five million people to connect its population for the first time.

== Story ==
The building of the Canadian Pacific Railway is an epic tale that begins in the 1880s and stretches over a century, with primary construction lasting from 1881 to 1885. Rocky Mountain Express highlights the aspects of the story that directly relate to the landscape the train is travelling through. The geography is illustrated by CGI maps and the history is told through dozens of black and white archival photographs.

The period of exploration and survey is quickly summarized over aerial shots illustrating the enormity of the task at hand and the variety of the landscape. The journey then begins in Vancouver with the departure of 2816 pulling a train made up of several period cars. One of the narrative difficulties was how to combine a linear and literal eastbound journey with a story about a construction project that advanced simultaneously from east and west and continued over decades. The solution was to let the journey dictate the narrative and to move back and forth in the historical timeline as necessary.

As the train proceeds eastward, the film tells the story of the challenges the builders faced in the granite cliffs of the Fraser Valley, where thousands of lives were lost; among the fragile, erosive sandstone hoodoos of the Thompson River; and bypassing the vast, deep lakes of the interior. As 2816 passes through Rogers Pass, the film explores the results of the gamble taken by the CPR and General manager Van Horne to set aside the recommended northerly route in favour of a more southerly route that would dissuade incursions from American railroads but depended on an as-yet-undiscovered pass through the Selkirks and a viable pass through the steep Rockies. Coming out of the Selkirks, the film takes a side trip southbound along the Columbia River and with the use of CGI, tells the story of the 1903 collapse of Turtle Mountain, which partially buried the mining town of Frank, Alberta, and the heroic rescue of an oncoming train. Returning to the main line, the train follows the Kicking Horse River up the west side of the Rocky Mountains and the film looks at the challenges faced by the builders and the engines coping with the dangerous grades of the ‘Big Hill’. As the train passes the continental divide, the sun comes out both literally and metaphorically on the majestic Rocky Mountains. This chapter celebrates the completion of the railway, the creation of Canada’s national parks system, and the birth of a flourishing tourism trade before bringing the audience and railway crashing back to face the reality of the inestimable difficulties of winter in the mountains, and particularly the Selkirks. The film ends with the train steaming off across the prairies to cross the continent and arrive in the port city of Montreal. The final moments are shots of the weathered stone and wood gravestones of unnamed workers—a monument to “the country they built—Canada.”

== Director ==
A train and history buff, writer/director Stephen Low had wanted to tell the story of the building of the CPR through Rogers’ Pass following the success of his first 35 mm documentary, Challenger: An Industrial Romance (1980), made at Canada’s National Film Board. At the time the financing for the 35 mm project fell through, a disappointment which he now considers a blessing. Low says he was flabbergasted when he heard the CPR was restoring 2816, which would enable him to tell the story from the viewpoint of a live steam engine. “I always wanted to do this film regarding the single greatest Canadian story,” he says. “I wanted to tell it in IMAX because when you get up in a helicopter and look down, you say, 'Holy cow! How could they have done that in the 1880s?' So every single shot is an illustration of the courage of these (workers), in my view. They overcame incredible difficulties, the workers. There were a lot of deaths, from blasting and avalanches. In the end, the thesis of the film is that those difficulties made possible the things we treasure the most in Canada.”

== Production ==
Production began in 2006 when Low learned that 2816 was going to be travelling through Montreal and got permission to do a few days of filming with the IMAX camera. The resulting demo was shown to the CPR who agreed to cooperate with the production of a full-length IMAX film shot primarily on the main line between Vancouver and Calgary. Over the next five years, the Calgary-based CPR and the steam program worked together with the Montreal-based production company to fit in one or two shoots a year. The scheduling challenges included the availability and location of the locomotive, the traffic on the main line between Calgary and Vancouver, the weather in the mountains, and the availability of the production company, which was also simultaneously making three IMAX 3D films.

== Historical photographs ==
The primary construction of the Canadian Pacific Railway took place between 1881 and 1885. Hundreds of photographs capturing that period and the early years of operation are preserved in archives across Canada. Workers, tourists, settlers—all are brought to life on the giant screen through the use of approximately fifty black and white photographs sourced from 13 archives, and featuring the work of more than twenty photographers.

== Post-production ==
The five-year shooting schedule allowed Low and editor James Lahti the luxury of taking their time in the cutting room, letting the film rest for months at a time while working on other projects. Low and Lahti worked together to find period-appropriate music for the film, and the original score was created by Montreal composer Michel Cusson. Cusson also composed the music for Low’s previous six films. As a train buff, Low knew how demanding the fans would be about the details of the sound. In addition to the sound recording done on each shoot, an extra trip was taken solely for the purpose of recording every detail of the locomotive in action. Sound design and editing were done in Toronto by Peter Thillaye and his team. Like Lahti, Thillaye’s history with Low began with The Last Buffalo in 1989. The six-channel mix was also done in Toronto by Cory Mandel.

== Distribution ==
Rocky Mountain Express had its world premiere on September 30, 2011, at the Canadian Museum of Civilization in Gatineau. Its American premiere took place on October 7, 2011, at the Museum of Science and Industry in Chicago. The film made up to $20 million in the first 2 years in the global box office. The film is distributed by The Stephen Low Company based in Dorval, Quebec.

== Home video release ==
On January 7, 2016, The Stephen Low Company announced an agreement with media company Shout Factory that Rocky Mountain Express would be released on Blu-ray in late spring or early summer 2016. They released it on Ultra HD Blu-ray.

== Awards ==
- Nominee, Golden Reel Awards, Sound Editing, 2012

== See also ==
- List of IMAX films
- History of Canada
