= Mark Twain's America =

1998 IMAX film

- Directed by: Stephen Low
- Written by: Stephen Low
- Screenplay by: Alex Low
- Story by: Stephen Low
- Narrated by: Anne Bancroft
- Cinematography: Andrew Kitzanuk
- Edited by: James Lahti
- Music by: Alan Williams
- Production company: Ogden Entertainment
- Distributed by: Sony Pictures Classics
- Release date: July 2, 1998
- Running time: 52 minutes
- Country: United States
- Language: English
- Box office: $2.2 million

Mark Twain's America is a 1998 IMAX film produced by Sony Pictures Classics and Ogden Entertainment documenting the United States through the eyes and words of Mark Twain. The film heavily features Twain hometown of Hannibal, Missouri. The film also weaves in historical photos, the steamboats of the Mississippi, Civil War reenactments, and a frog jumping contest. It was directed by Stephen Low with a 52-minute runtime, with narration by Anne Bancroft.
