= Across the Sea of Time =

- Film poster
- Directed by: Stephen Low
- Written by: Andrew Gellis
- Produced by: Stephen Low
- Starring: Peter Reznick
- Narrated by: Dennis O'Connor
- Cinematography: Andrew Kitzanuk
- Edited by: James Lahti
- Music by: John Barry
- Production companies: Sony New Technologies; Columbia Pictures
- Distributed by: Sony Pictures Classics
- Release date: October 20, 1995
- Running time: 52 minutes
- Country: United States
- Languages: English; Russian
- Box office: $16 million

Across the Sea of Time is a 1995 American IMAX 3D adventure film produced and directed by Stephen Low, and written by Andrew Gellis. It stars Peter Reznick as a young Russian boy who travels to the United States in search of his ancestor's family.

== Plot ==
The plot centres around a real life Russian immigrant, searching for his family, who is given the name Leopold Minton by the Ellis Island immigration officials (because they are unable to pronounce his Russian name). Minton is employed by a company to take stereoscopic photographs for the (at that time) popular Holmes stereoscope. This provides the film with an opportunity to show many stereoscopic images, both past and present, of New York City.

Minton, who had no fear of heights, produced an unrivalled collection of images of the development of New York's skyscrapers. Minton also documented the construction of New York's subway system. The film also includes a number of Minton's private stereo photographs that were not publicly released during his lifetime. Some of these images reveal how Minton was able to take some of the photographs of the skyscraper construction without actually standing on them.

== Cast ==
- Peter Reznick as Thomas Minton
- John McDonough as Freighter Chief
- Victor Steinbach as Seaman—Pilot
- Peter Boyden as ConEd Worker
- Philip Levy as Hot Dog Vendor
- Nick Muglia as Policeman
- Abby Lewis as Julia Minton
- Matt Malloy as Wall Street Businessman
- Luigi Petrozza as Pizza Pie Man
- Bernard Ferstenberg as Pickle Vendor
- Robert Buckley as Socialite
- Donald Trump as himself
- Patrick Flynn as Bartender

== Music ==
The film's score was composed by John Barry.

1. The Wonder of America
2. Into New York
3. Ellis Island
4. Never Have I Felt So Free
5. The Lower East Side
6. The Automobile, The Telephone
7. The Subway
8. The Subway Ride
9. Coney Island
10. Up to the Sky
11. Flight Over New York
12. Central Park
13. Times Square and Broadway
14. Scary Night in the Park
15. A New Day Will Come
16. Searching
17. Welcome to America, Welcome to New York
18. Across the Sea of Time

== Reception ==
=== Box office ===
Across the Sea of Time grossed $16,015,639.
