= César Award for Best Film from the European Union =

Film award

This is a list of the winners of and nominees for the César Award for Best Film from the European Union (Meilleur film de l'Union Européenne). The prize was awarded three times, in 2003, 2004 and 2005, and was subsequently discontinued. In 2005, two films were honoured.

A film qualified for the prize if it was shown at least seven days in a public cinema in the region of Paris between 1 January and 31 December of the previous year.

== Winners and nominees ==
=== 2000s ===
2003 Talk to Her (Hable con ella), Spain, directed by Pedro Almodóvar

11'9"01 September 11, inter alia UK/France/USA/Iran, directed by inter alia Claude Lelouch, Ken Loach, and Alejandro González Iñárritu
Gosford Park, UK, directed by Robert Altman
The Man Without a Past (Mies vailla menneisyyttä), Finland, directed by Aki Kaurismäki
Sweet Sixteen, UK, directed by Ken Loach

2004 Good Bye, Lenin!, Germany, directed by Wolfgang Becker

Dogville, Denmark, directed by Lars von Trier
The Magdalene Sisters, UK/Ireland, directed by Peter Mullan
The Best of Youth (La meglio gioventù), Italy, directed by Marco Tullio Giordana
Respiro, Italy/France, directed by Emanuele Crialese

2005 Ae Fond Kiss..., UK/Belgium/Germany/Italy/Spain, directed by Ken Loach
Life Is a Miracle (Život je čudo), Serbia/France, directed by Emir Kusturica

Bad Education (La mala educación), Spain, directed by Pedro Almodóvar
Mondovino, Argentina/France/Italy/USA, directed by Jonathan Nossiter
Saraband, Sweden, directed by Ingmar Bergman
