= Dogs of Hell =

1983 American film

Dogs of Hell (Rottweiler)
- Theatrical release poster
- Directed by: Worth Keeter
- Written by: Thom McIntyre
- Produced by: Earl Owensby
- Starring: Earl Owensby; Bill Gribble; Robert Bloodworth
- Cinematography: Irl Dixon
- Edited by: Jack Hofstra; Worth Keeter; Bruce Stubblefield
- Music by: Stephen Heller
- Production company: Earl Owensby Studios
- Release date: May 23, 1983
- Running time: 89 minutes
- Country: United States
- Language: English

Dogs of Hell (originally titled Rottweiler 3-D; also known as Rottweiler and Rottweiler: The Dogs of Hell) is a 1983 American horror film directed by Worth Keeter and produced by Earl Owensby, starring Bill Gribble and Robert Bloodworth, as well as Owensby.

Dogs of Hell was the first of six 3D films to be shot by Owensby Studios in the early to mid-1980s, and was shot over the summer and fall of 1981, taking only two months to complete. It had a wider release in theaters compared to subsequent Owensby 3D films, including Hot Heir (1984), Chain Gang (1984), Hyperspace (1984), Tales of the Third Dimension (1984) and Hit the Road Running (1987).

== Premise ==
A U.S. military funded scientist (an animal behavior specialist), Adam Fletcher (Bill Gribble) has developed and surgically implanted a chip that controls a pack of specially-bred Rottweilers. A military colonel arrives at his facility and announces that this new weapon will be moved to be tested in the field. As the pack of dogs is being moved, the semi-truck carrying them flips over and the dogs escape. The Rottweilers soon head into the mountains around the peaceful community of Lake Lure. As vicious dog attacks begin to take out tourists and residents, the local law officer, Sheriff Hank Willis (Owensby); Dr. Fellows, the local doctor (Ed Lillard); Carl Dunnigan, a local hunter (Elijah Perry), and Dr. Fletcher (Gribble) unite to stop the pack and save lives. There are many dog attacks and deaths as the pack goes on a rampage.

== Production ==
Producer Earl Owensby began looking into 3D films shortly before the release of Comin' at Ya! purchasing three lenses from Chris Condon's Stereovision International. The idea for the film grew out of a conversation between Owensby, who owned two Rottweilers, and the dog's trainer, with the trainer pitching the premise of a pack of escaped Rottweilers with Owensby as the hero. While Owensby typically avoided hiring outside personnel for his films, various consultants from Stereovision were involved in the production to help teach the crew about how best to utilize the equipment with Director of Photography, Earl Dixon, eventually able to shoot a good amount of footage without help from Stereovision consultants. The film was shot in Georgia and North Carolina
