= Leon Rippy =

American actor (born 1949)

- Born: October 30, 1949 (age 77); Rock Hill, South Carolina, U.S.
- Occupation: Actor
- Years active: 1983–present

Leon Rippy (born October 30, 1949) is an American actor. Active on screen since 1983, Rippy has appeared in numerous films and recurring roles on television. He is best known for his roles as Earl the Angel on the series Saving Grace, saloon owner Tom Nuttall on the series Deadwood and militiaman John Billings in The Patriot (2000).

== Career ==
Rippy's acting career developed through appearances in regional theatrical productions. He founded and operated two theatre companies. Rippy has appeared in more than seventy plays. His non-acting occupations have included working with a circus and as a foreman of a cattle ranch. At one time he was regarded as an accomplished ballet dancer.

Rippy has worked with Roland Emmerich on seven movies: Moon 44 (1990), Eye of the Storm (1991), Universal Soldier (1992), Stargate (1994), The Thirteenth Floor (1999), The Patriot (2000), and Eight Legged Freaks (2002). He also had roles in The Alamo (2004) and The Lone Ranger (2013).

His television appearances include a guest role on Star Trek: The Next Generation ("The Neutral Zone"), Quantum Leap, Walker, Texas Ranger, Werewolf, Leverage, Six Feet Under, and Deadwood, an HBO series in which he played Tom Nuttall. Rippy co-starred in the TNT crime drama series Saving Grace. He also appeared in North and South as Sanders, and in Alcatraz as Dr. Beauregard.

== Filmography ==
Year	Title	Role	Notes
1983	Chiefs	Tommy Allen	Miniseries
1983	I-40 Paradise	Chicken Farmer	TNN Sitcom segment
1984	Firestarter	Blinded Agent	
1984	Hyperspace	Roy	
1984	Chain Gang		
1984	Tales of the Third Dimension	Freddie	Segment: "The Guardians"
1985	The Color Purple	Store Clerk	
1985	Marie	Gary Gerbitz	
1985	Rockin' Road Trip	Earl Reese	
1986	Maximum Overdrive	Brad	
1986	Raw Deal	Man in Tux	
1986	King Kong Lives	Will	
1986	No Mercy	Man #2	
1986	North and South	Sanders	Book II, episode #1.2
1987	The Bedroom Window	Seedy Bartender	
1987	Hit the Road Running	Doogan	
1987	Werewolf	Crawford	Episode: "Eye of the Storm"
1987	The Rutherford County Line		aka Damon's Law
1988	Traxx	Killer	
1988	Star Trek: The Next Generation	L. Q. "Sonny" Clemmons	Episode: "The Neutral Zone"
1988	Jesse		TV movie
1988	Track 29	Trucker	
1988	Illegally Yours	Prosecutor	
1988	Hunter	Russ Tolson	Episode: "The Fourth Man"
1988	The Tracker	Chub Dumont	TV movie
1988	Born to Race	Joel	TV movie
1989	Hardball		Episode: "The Cleveland Indian"
1990	Loose Cannons	Weskit	
1990	Moon 44	Master Sergeant Sykes	
1990	Young Guns II	Bob Olinger	
1990	The Hot Spot	Deputy Tate	
1990	Quantum Leap	Sheriff Taggart	Episode: "Freedom - November 22, 1970"
1991	Eye of the Storm	Sheriff	
1991	Hard Time Romance	Hugh Dean Simpson	
1992	Universal Soldier	Woodward	
1992	Beyond the Law	Virgil	
1992	Kuffs	Kane	
1993	Perry Mason	Tex	TV movie: The Case of the Wicked Wives
1993	Diagnosis Murder	Bob Cole	Episodes: "Vanishing Act pt. 1 & 2"
1993–2001	Walker, Texas Ranger	Creede / Robert Chastain / Vince Pike / Dewey Baker	4 episodes
1994	Stargate	Major General W. O. West	
1996	The Arrival	DOD #1	
1997	Still Movin	Mr. Jennings	
1997	Midnight in the Garden of Good and Evil	Detective Boone	
1997	Gun	Scooter	Episode: "The Hole"
1997–1998	The Visitor	Agent Nicholas LaRue	13 episodes
1999	The Thirteenth Floor	Jane's Lawyer	
1999	CI5: The New Professionals	Lang	Episode: "Glory Days"
2000	The Patriot	John Billings	
2001	The Fugitive	Buddy LaRue	Episode: "New Orleans Saints"
2001	The Man with No Eyes	Father Patrick	Short film
2002	Eight Legged Freaks	Wade	
2003	The Life of David Gale	Braxton Belyeu	
2003	Six Feet Under	Daddy	Episode: "Tears, Bones & Desire"
2004	The Alamo	Sergeant William Ward	
2004–2006	Deadwood	Tom Nuttall	29 episodes
2006	Gridiron Gang	Paul Higa	
2007–2010	Saving Grace	Earl	46 episodes
2011–2012	Leverage	Jack Latimer / Mysterious Man	5 episodes
2012	Alcatraz	Dr. Milton Beauregard	12 episodes
2013	Under The Dome	Ollie Dinsmore	5 episodes
2013	The Lone Ranger	Collins	
2014	Rectify	Lezlie	2 episodes
2016	11.22.63	Harry Dunning	2 episodes
2016–2017	The Blacklist	Hunter	4 episodes
2019	Deadwood: The Movie	Tom Nuttall	TV movie

== Awards and nominations ==
Year	Association	Category	Nominated work	Result
2007	Screen Actors Guild Awards	Outstanding Performance by an Ensemble in a Drama Series	Deadwood	Nominated

== Personal life ==
Rippy is married to Carol.
