= Count Binface =

British novelty political candidate

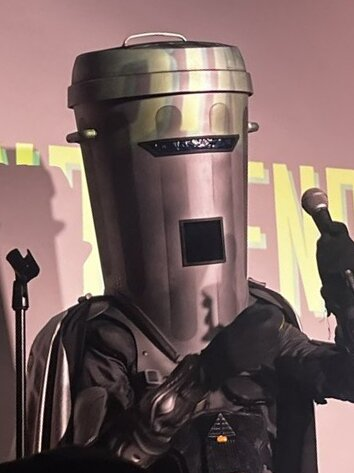
- Count Binface in 2024
- First appearance: 12 December 2018
- Created by: Jon Harvey
- Portrayed by: Jon Harvey

In-universe information
- Species: Recyclon
- Title: Leader of the Recyclons
- Origin: Sigma IX

Count Binface is a novelty candidate persona adopted by the British writer and comedian Jon Harvey to contest elections in the United Kingdom. Binface is presented as an "intergalactic space warrior" who wears a dustbin-shaped helmet.

Binface stood against the prime minister, Boris Johnson, in Uxbridge and South Ruislip at the 2019 general election, and the 2023 by-election which followed Johnson's resignation as a member of Parliament. He contested the 2021 and 2024 London mayoral elections, and stood against the prime minister, Rishi Sunak, in Richmond and Northallerton at the 2024 general election. Binface stood at the 2026 Makerfield by-election, which was won by Andy Burnham, who became prime minister. Binface was the primary contender against the Reform UK leader Nigel Farage at the 2026 Clacton by-election amidst a boycott by the other major parties. He came second with 27% of the vote (9,455 in total), which is thought to be the highest share obtained by a novelty candidate in UK political history.

Binface promotes electoral participation, and has adopted the slogan "Make Your Vote Count". He originally stood as an independent, but his affiliation since 2023 has been to the Count Binface Party.

== Creation ==
Binface was created by Jon Harvey, who had previously performed as Lord Buckethead against Theresa May at the 2017 general election. After the filmmaker Todd Durham, who owned the rights to the Buckethead character from his 1984 film Hyperspace, asserted ownership and took over the character, Harvey introduced Count Binface, standing against the prime minister, Boris Johnson, in Uxbridge and South Ruislip at the 2019 general election. The Buckethead character's new performer, David Hughes, publicly endorsed Binface as "the true heir to the Buckethead throne". Harvey, who rarely gives interviews out of character, has said that "My job is to celebrate and defend the wonders of British democracy".

== Character ==
External videos
- Binface channel
- Count Binface at Oxford Union Debate 2024 arguing against the motion "This House Would Fake it Til You Make It"

Count Binface is an "intergalactic space warrior" in a black-and-grey uniform, with a long silver cape and a helmet shaped like a dustbin with a glowing strip in place of eyes. He describes himself as the leader of the Recyclons from the planet Sigma IX, and claims to be over 5,900 years old. Binface named his second-in-command as "General Waste".

In an appearance on the BBC's Newsnight on 8 July 2026, when asked by the presenter Paddy O'Connell to remove his mask, Harvey said that "nobody wants to know" what is underneath a Recyclon's helmet, describing it as "absolutely putrefying". In 2026 he appeared in an episode of the television drama series Industry, as a candidate in a general election. His candidacy in the 2026 Clacton by-election, against Nigel Farage, gained global media attention.

Binface claims to master 7 million forms of communication, and recounted to The Londonist how he had strategically chosen to converse with Boris Johnson during the 2019 London Mayoral election in a language he was certain would be understood. After greeting each other in Latin, Binface quoted Julius Caesar — "the die is cast" – but which Boris had misinterpreted that he was destined for a long period of political power. Binface set off in a stream of Homeric Greek in an episode of The Rest is Politics podcast.

== Other ventures ==
Binface has made numerous appearances other than as a political candidate, at debates and open fora: he was invited to participate in an Oxford Union debate in 2024, where he wrapped up a debate against the motion "This House Would Fake it Til You Make It", and was interviewed by the zoologist Jules Howard at the Cheltenham Literature Festival about apes and procreation, and by the comedian Richard Herring in July 2026 for his podcast in advance of the Clacton by-election.

Binface also performs comedy shows; his first national tour was in the autumn of 2024. His July 2026 show in London's Museum of Comedy, entitled "A (Moral) Victory Rally", sold out. In August 2026, he performed a one-off show, Face of the Establishment, at the Pleasance Dome as part of the Edinburgh Festival Fringe.

In August 2026 a 72-page Count Binface comic book was released by British independent graphic novel publisher SelfMadeHero. With almost 40 artists, writers and cartoonists, contributors included Bryan Talbot, Dave McKean, and Steven Appleby. The publisher, which was considering a second print run, said pre-sale orders of the book "had gone through the roof".

== Elections ==
Count Binface Party: Plaid Cont y Wyned Bin (Welsh); Cunta Aghaidh-biona (Scottish Gaelic)
- Leader: Count Binface a.k.a Jonathan Harvey
- Spokesperson: Tom Walker
- Founder: Jon Harvey
- Founded: 18 March 2021
- Ideology: Political satire
- House of Commons: 0 / 650

Election symbol

Website
- countbinface.com

=== 2019 general election ===
Count Binface declared a suite of "fully costed" policies, which included abolishing the House of Lords — a pledge he had likewise made in 2017 as Lord Buckethead — and bringing back Ceefax, the teletext service — a pledge he had first made in 2017. The same platform included "the nationalisation of Adele and so on."

On foreign policy, he pledged no more UK arms sales to repressive regimes, such as Saudi Arabia; making Piers Morgan zero emissions by 2030 is part of his environmental programme. On Europe, he called for a referendum on holding a re-run of the 2016 United Kingdom European Union membership referendum, and pledged that any Czechs found on the Irish border would be allowed to remain there. On policing, he echoed the Conservative Party's own pledge of 20,000 more police officers by promising to return one more police officer on the beat than the Tories. He pledged the nationalisation of model railways.

On the constitution, only people between 16 and 80 would be able to vote; on infrastructure, he promised free broadband for all, and that London Bridge would be renamed "Phoebe Waller-Bridge." On health, £1 trillion a week would be put towards the NHS.

Binface welcomed Lord Buckethead, a rival contestant in the Uxbridge and South Ruislip seat representing the Official Monster Raving Loony Party, "to take part in a receptacle-to-receptacle debate". Binface received 69 votes: a vote share of 0.1%.

=== 2021 London mayoral election ===
Binface announced his intention to stand for the London mayoral election, which was scheduled for 2020 but delayed to 2021 due to the COVID-19 pandemic. He announced a suite of 21 policies which "marries fiscal responsibility, social awareness, and not being an anti-vaccine nutjob", including:

- finishing Crossrail
- free parking for electric vehicles between Vine Street and the Strand, in reference to where the Free Parking space is located on the British Monopoly game board
- London to join the European Union
- renaming London Bridge to "Phoebe Waller-Bridge" and Hammersmith Bridge to "Wayne Bridge".
- tying all government ministers' pay, including that of the mayors, to that of nurses for the next 100 years
- banning loud snacks from theatres
- banning the use of the speakerphone function on mobile phones, with offenders forced to watch the 2019 film Cats every day for a year

Binface started a fundraiser to raise £10,000, the amount necessary to allow him to stand for Mayor of London. The excess money was donated to the charity Shelter to help combat homelessness. He finished ninth with 24,775 votes in the mayoral election.

=== 2024 London mayoral election ===
In March 2024 Binface started another fundraiser to allow him to stand at the London mayoral election held on 2 May 2024, with funds in excess of the necessary £10,000 deposit to once again be donated to the housing charity, Shelter. After he announced his entry into the race and released his manifesto, he made a surprise appearance at Glastonbury 2024. The Binface manifesto re-used many policies from previous years but added a few new ones, including abolishing VAR; forcing Thames Water managers to "take a dip in the Thames... see how they like it", in reference to the sewage discharge controversy; building "at least one affordable house", referring to the housing crisis; and giving listed building status to Claudia Winkleman's fringe.

Despite the election's change to a first-past-the-post voting system, Binface finished in 11th place with 24,260 votes – ahead of the far-right Britain First. Binface said in 2024 this result was an achievement of which he was the most proud. The incumbent mayor and winner, Sadiq Khan, in a victory speech remarked about celebrating "becoming the first person in British political history to win successive victories over Count Binface". He added that Binface finishing ahead of the Britain First candidate was "another reason to love London".

=== 2024 general election ===
On 7 June 2024 Binface announced he would be contesting the Richmond and Northallerton constituency against the prime minister, Rishi Sunak, saying that he was "taking on the biggest fish of the lot". He commented; "You shirked D-Day Rishi, you can't miss the B-Day", a reference to Sunak's early departure from the commemoration of the 80th anniversary of the Normandy landings. New policies announced in Binface's manifesto include:

- building a "space bridge" to solve the traffic problems caused by Northallerton's level crossings.
- reducing the price of 99 Flake ice creams to 99 pence
- National Service for former prime ministers
- Inviting European nations to join the UK

Binface enlisted the YouTuber and mathematician Matt Parker to create charts for his free election pamphlet and to act as an election observer on behalf of the Count Binface Party. The Daily Star issued a co-endorsement of Binface and the Labour Party candidate. Binface finished sixth of thirteen candidates with 308 votes, representing 0.6% of all the votes cast. He commented on Twitter that it was his best placing and highest ever vote count in a national election and declared that "Bindependence Day has come".

=== 2026 Makerfield by-election ===
For the 2026 Makerfield by-election, Binface stated in his manifesto that he would build at least one affordable house, cap the price of a 99 Flake at 99p, and that of a "Wigan kebab" – a misnomer but a barm cake – at £2. Binface urged tax reform: "Vote Count Binface to... cut your taxes and raise everyone else's", to ban automatic renewal of online subscriptions, and reiterated his pledge to nationalise Adele. He also said "I believe elected mayors should serve out their terms before they're eligible to stand for parliament", a criticism of Andy Burnham, who won the by-election while still serving as Mayor of Greater Manchester.

Binface gained 95 votes, 68 votes behind the Liberal Democrat candidate, and seventh out of 14 candidates. In Prime Minister's Questions after the by-election, Keir Starmer sarcastically congratulated Kemi Badenoch's Conservative Party for their 2.2% share of the vote in Makerfield, "just edging past Count Binface". Burnham posted a photo of himself shaking hands with Binface and captioned it: "Always worth knowing when bin day is." In a further post, he wrote: "Count Binface, you are carrying the hopes of the nation. Don't let us down."

=== 2026 Clacton by-election ===
On 7 July 2026, faced with parliamentary scrutiny of his personal finances and allegations concerning undeclared gifts and support, Nigel Farage announced his intention to resign as the MP for Clacton, triggering a by-election. The other major parties – Labour, the Conservatives, the Liberal Democrats and the Greens – as well as Restore Britain, announced they would boycott the by-election. The foreign secretary, Yvette Cooper, and Green leader Zack Polanski criticised Farage's resignation as "political stunt", which Farage denied. Badenoch condemned the "fake" election as a distraction. The Chancellor of the Exchequer, Rachel Reeves, whose role it was to accept his resignation, criticised Farage on social media, saying "the people of Clacton deserve better. But if he wants to spend the summer arguing with a bin, I won't stop him."

Campaigner Richard Murphy saw Binface as lampooning the failure of Britain's political system to provide convincing solutions, and wrote that satire and ridicule have become one of the few effective ways of challenging populist politics when conventional opposition fails. Binface's platform was criticised in an opinion piece in the Daily Telegraph, where Daniel Hannan objected on economic grounds to price-capping of kebabs (although this was not part of Binface's Clacton manifesto), and saw the pledge to "cut your taxes and raise everyone else's" as encapsulating "why Britain is in such a mess".

On 14 August 2026, Farage was returned as MP with 63.3% of the vote, although the poll was boycotted by all of the main Westminster parties, who described it as "a stunt." Binface came second with 27% of the vote. According to the BBC, Binface's 9,455 votes, representing 27% of the ballots cast, is the highest obtained by a novelty candidate in UK political history.

==== Binface's candidacy ====
Binface announced his candidacy for the by-election by saying "I will be a unity candidate". He added that "Nigel Farage says he wants the people versus the establishment. So be it. Leave him to me."

In an interview with BBC Radio 4, Binface said his job was "to celebrate and defend the wonders of British democracy". Regarding the other major parties dropping out of the race, he questioned whether they were "running scared from old Binny" or if they thought Farage was "running a cunning stunt". Saying that his main appeal would be the fact that he was not Farage, he confirmed that he had never been to Clacton, and would not be campaigning there as he had understood from the incumbent that staying away from the constituency was "part of how you do the job". His manifesto pledges are as always tailored to the local area, but emphasised that most of his national policies would remain.

His manifesto for Clacton, launched on 27 July, included some perennial pledges, such as to build one affordable house, but he also targeted his opponent by promising to "spend more time in Clacton-on-Sea than in Washington DC"; to bar MPs who resign mid-parliament from the resulting by-election; to "not accept any £5m gifts from crypto billionaires (on Earth)". He sought to represent the UK at Eurovision and said he would bring the contest to Clacton in 2028 if he won. Anticipating the question of dress code in Parliament, Binface said: "If people vote Binface, they get Binface... I know there are parliamentary rules saying you can't wear a costume. I'll just have to change those rules."

Binface received a surge of support from activists after announcing his candidacy, raising more than £15,000 in donations in a day, which he described as akin to a "fever dream". He said he hoped to appeal to voters from all sides of the political spectrum and said he could even court the immigrant vote, given that he was "the ultimate alien". The major Labour donor Dale Vince offered to fund Binface's campaign, adding: "I want Binface to win, and I am prepared to support him – morally, verbally and financially."

==== Parliamentary and political commentary ====
Binface was pitted against Farage in media coverage, with The Independent reporting on 8 July that Binface had become the recipient of an anti-Farage tactical voting campaign. The Guardian likened the attempt to 1997 when the Labour and Liberal Democrat candidates stood down for Martin Bell against the scandal-ridden incumbent Neil Hamilton. The New Statesman business editor Will Dunn called for a united front in support of Binface's candidacy. Dunn later clarified that he did not mean to endorse Binface, but the position Binface occupies in British politics.

Warning about a potential "constitutional crisis" were Binface to be elected, David Wolfson, the Shadow Attorney General for England and Wales, said that parliamentary convention dictates that MPs "may not address the House wearing a hat".

Dan Jarvis, then-Secretary of State for Defence, wished Binface good luck. While Badenoch said that Binface might be the people's candidate if the by-election was a "people versus the establishment" contest, Starmer said he could not endorse him due to Labour Party rules, when asked about Binface at the 2026 NATO summit.

At Starmer's final appearance in Prime Minister's Questions, Badenoch asked whether he agreed that the country deserved a televised debate between Farage and Binface. Starmer replied by urging everyone to "put [their] vote in the Bin", which was interpreted by The Daily Telegraph as an endorsement.

== Electoral history ==
Election	Office or Constituency	Votes	Percent	Position
2019 United Kingdom general election	Uxbridge and South Ruislip	69	0.1	6 of 11
2021 London mayoral election	Mayor of London	24,775	1.0	8 of 19
2023 Uxbridge and South Ruislip by-election	Uxbridge and South Ruislip	190	0.6	8 of 17
2024 London mayoral election	Mayor of London	24,260	1.0	11 of 13
2024 United Kingdom general election	Richmond and Northallerton	308	0.6	6 of 13
2026 Makerfield by-election	Makerfield	95	0.2	7 of 14
2026 Clacton by-election	Clacton	9,455	26.9	2 of 34

== Bibliography ==
- Binface, Count (2022). What On Earth?: An Alien's Guide to Fixing Britain. London: Quercus Editions. ISBN 9781529421651.
- Count Binface. "Count Binface Lifts The Lid" – via Substack.

=== Trash Talk ... with Count Binface ===
"The podcast from planet Sigma IX which is now available on Earth."

No.	Guest(s)	Running time	Original release date
1	Al Murray	28:39	30 May 2024
Comedian Al Murray, who stood as a parliamentary candidate against Nigel Farage in South Thanet in 2015, discusses his own experience of standing for election.
2	Marina Purkiss	31:22	4 June 2024
Political commentator and podcaster Marina Purkiss discusses her interest in Westminster politics and the early stages of the 2024 United Kingdom general election campaign.
3	Zoe Garbett	29:07	7 June 2024
London Assembly member Zoe Garbett discusses the Green Party UK's general election plans and her past interactions with Count Binface as a fellow candidate.
4	Rosie Holt	31:45	11 June 2024
Comedian Rosie Holt, known for her viral satirical portrayals of a fictional Conservative MP, discusses the character and the 2024 election campaign.
5	Eliot Higgins	31:09	14 June 2024
Bellingcat founder Eliot Higgins discusses election disinformation and American politics.
6	Manifesto '24	12:33	18 June 2024
An episode presenting the 24 pledges of the Count Binface Party's manifesto for the 2024 general election, with no interview guest.
7	Simon McCoy	22:06	20 June 2024
Broadcaster Simon McCoy hosts a mock election debate with Count Binface.
8	Paul Gorton	25:40	25 June 2024
The Traitors contestant Paul Gorton discusses identifying "traitors" among politicians.
9	Nitin Sawhney	27:21	1 July 2024
Musician Nitin Sawhney is interviewed in an episode recorded around Count Binface's appearance at the Glastonbury Festival.
10	Ian Hislop	28:56	3 July 2024
Private Eye editor Ian Hislop discusses the final days of the 2024 general election campaign.
11	Matt Parker	31:16	4 July 2024
Mathematician and author Matt Parker, acting as the campaign's "official stat-checker", joins a special election-night episode.
12	308 Votes — Election Night BTS	11:19	5 July 2024
A behind-the-scenes bonus episode covering the count in the Richmond and Northallerton constituency, with no single interview guest.
13	Rob Ford	34:14	10 July 2024
University of Manchester political scientist Rob Ford, who worked on the general election exit poll, discusses electoral statistics.
14	Iain Lee	30:28	20 July 2024
Broadcaster Iain Lee is interviewed in the first weekly post-election episode.
15	Stewart Lee	36:01	27 July 2024
Comedian Stewart Lee discusses the 2024 US presidential election and offers advice on touring.
16	Jonn Elledge	34:38	3 August 2024
Author and journalist Jonn Elledge discusses his book on the history of unusual international borders.
17	Matthew Wright	37:57	10 August 2024
Broadcaster Matthew Wright, former host of The Wright Stuff, discusses the 2024 UK riots and the changing media landscape.
18	Susie Boniface	38:00	17 August 2024
Daily Mirror columnist Susie Boniface, who writes under the byline "Fleet Street Fox", discusses press ownership and print journalism.
19	Ria Lina	35:45	24 August 2024
Comedian and actress Ria Lina discusses infectious disease and the 2024 US presidential election.
20	Alice Roberts	34:21	7 September 2024
Biological anthropologist and broadcaster Alice Roberts is interviewed on open-access science and human evolution.
21	Cardiff debrief	11:41	14 September 2024
An episode recorded the morning after the opening night of Count Binface's UK comedy tour in Cardiff, with no interview guest.
22	Miranda Sawyer	34:45	24 September 2024
Journalist and author Miranda Sawyer discusses her book on 1990s British popular culture.
23	Bonus episode – Happy Birthday Ceefax	25:51	30 September 2024
A special episode marking the 50th anniversary of the teletext service Ceefax, with no interview guest.
24	Mitch Benn	14:53	15 October 2024
Comedian and musician Mitch Benn appears backstage during Count Binface's UK comedy tour.
25	Nick Newman	38:55	2 November 2024
The Sunday Times cartoonist and comedy writer Nick Newman discusses satire and a forthcoming stage play co-written with Ian Hislop.
26	Richard Bacon	29:32	4 November 2024
Broadcaster Richard Bacon, who has lived in the United States, discusses American television formats and the 2024 US presidential election.
27	Isaac Davy-Aronson	33:21	5 November 2024
MSNBC supervising producer and podcaster Isaac Davy-Aronson discusses the 2024 US presidential election on polling day.
28	Amy Hoggart	26:39	9 November 2024
Writer and performer Amy Hoggart, formerly of Full Frontal with Samantha Bee, discusses the outcome of the 2024 US presidential election.
29	Wendy Chamberlain	40:28	21 November 2024
Liberal Democrat MP for North East Fife and party chief whip Wendy Chamberlain discusses election strategy, the first sitting MP interviewed as part of the podcast's "Project 650" strand.
30	Giuseppe Dell'Anno	27:28	26 November 2024
The Great British Bake Off winner Giuseppe Dell'Anno discusses baking in an episode themed around a fictional "croissant policy".
31	Matt Winning	32:09	22 December 2024
Climate scientist and comedian Matt Winning discusses environmental policy following the 2024 United Nations Climate Change Conference (COP29).
32	Bonus Xmas episode	20:11	25 December 2024
A Christmas bonus episode featuring coverage of a sporting event, with no interview guest.
33	Sathnam Sanghera	39:16	18 January 2025
Author and journalist Sathnam Sanghera discusses his books on the legacy of the British Empire.
34	Isaac Davy-Aronson	35:43	26 January 2025
Isaac Davy-Aronson returns to discuss the start of the second presidency of Donald Trump.
35	Joelle Grogan	29:35	4 February 2025
Legal academic Joelle Grogan, an expert in rule of law and EU/UK public law, discusses legal affairs.
36	Mike Carlson	38:20	6 February 2025
American sports journalist Mike Carlson discusses the Super Bowl ahead of Super Bowl LIX.
37	Jemma Forte	38:24	18 February 2025
Political commentator and podcaster Jemma Forte discusses political campaigning, including work with the group Led By Donkeys.
38	Charles Nove	40:57	1 March 2025
Radio broadcaster Charles Nove is interviewed in an episode recorded during a period of political developments in Washington.
39	Gavin Esler	52:17	24 March 2025
Journalist and broadcaster Gavin Esler discusses the state of long-form news interviewing and the future of the BBC.
40	Lewis MacLeod	39:57	5 April 2025
Impressionist Lewis MacLeod, known for voicing figures including Donald Trump and Boris Johnson on Dead Ringers, discusses his character work.
41	Ian Rankin	37:09	30 June 2025
Novelist Ian Rankin is the guest for the return of the podcast's second series.
42	Mark Gatiss	45:43	8 July 2025
Actor and writer Mark Gatiss discusses politics, comedy and his television work.
43	Helen Lewis	46:03	29 July 2025
Journalist, author and podcaster Helen Lewis discusses her book on the concept of genius.
44	Jan Ravens	40:15	5 August 2025
Impressionist Jan Ravens, known for her work on Dead Ringers, performs as Liz Truss in conversation with Count Binface.
45	Rupa Huq	42:22	12 August 2025
Labour MP Rupa Huq is interviewed as the second sitting MP in the podcast's "Project 650" strand.
46	Jules Howard	61:00	19 August 2025
Zoologist and author Jules Howard discusses animal behaviour and its parallels with politics.
47	Alastair Campbell	54:44	28 August 2025
Broadcaster and former political strategist Alastair Campbell discusses his podcast The Rest Is Politics and Keir Starmer's first year in office.
48	Daniel Norcross	50:43	4 September 2025
Test Match Special commentator Daniel Norcross discusses cricket.
49	Richard Herring	43:00	11 September 2025
Comedian Richard Herring discusses comedy, cancer awareness and current affairs.
50	Fifty Not Out!	38:31	19 September 2025
A retrospective episode marking the podcast's fiftieth instalment, compiling highlights from its first fifty episodes with no new interview guest.
51	Sean O'Grady	47:18	8 October 2025
The Independent associate editor Sean O'Grady, the first journalist to have interviewed Count Binface, returns as a guest.
52	Chris Barker	39:58	8 November 2025
Artist Chris Barker discusses his annual "year in review" photomontages ahead of what he said would be their final edition.
53	Paul Gorton	46:06	17 November 2025
Paul Gorton, of The Traitors, returns to discuss a period of turmoil at the BBC, including the departures of its Director-General and Head of News.
54	Susie Dent	51:22	24 December 2025
Lexicographer and broadcaster Susie Dent is the guest for a Christmas special episode.
55	Hannah Spencer	30:54	24 February 2026
Green Party candidate Hannah Spencer, standing in the Gorton and Denton by-election, appears in a by-election special.
56	Lord Finkelstein	38:12	10 March 2026
Conservative peer and journalist Daniel Finkelstein becomes the first member of the House of Lords interviewed for the podcast.

== See also ==
- Darth Vader in Ukrainian politics
- List of novelty human election candidates
