= Buckethead (disambiguation) =

Buckethead (born 1969) is an American guitarist and songwriter.

Buckethead may also refer to:

- Bucketheads, a dance music act featuring DJ and producer Kenny 'Dope' Gonzales
- "Bucketheads", a nickname given to fans of the Manawatu Turbos rugby team in New Zealand

== See also ==
- Lord Buckethead, a British political satirist who has run for political office four times
- Lord Buckethead, protagonist of the 1984 film Hyperspace
