= Jon Harvey =

British comedy writer and performer (born 1980)

- Born: Jonathan David Harvey; 23 February 1980 (age 46); Croydon, London, England
- Education: University of Oxford (BA)
- Occupations: Writer; comedian
- Known for: Count Binface
- Notable work: A Fan for All Seasons (2023)
- Spouse: Sarah Daykin (m. 2022)
- Children: 2
- Website: jondharvey.com

Jonathan David Harvey (born 23 February 1980) is a British comedy writer and performer. Since 2019 he has been best known for creating and performing as Count Binface, a novelty candidate who contests British elections as an "intergalactic space warrior" wearing a dustbin-shaped helmet. Harvey had previously performed a similar character, Lord Buckethead, standing against Theresa May at the 2017 general election, but was forced to retire it and create Count Binface in its place after a dispute with the filmmaker Todd Durham, who owns the rights to the Buckethead character. Harvey rarely gives interviews or appears in public out of character.

== Background ==
Jonathan David Harvey was born in Croydon, London, on 23 February 1980. His father, an estate agent, was an alcoholic, and died in 2005, aged 57. Harvey lived in 11 houses in his first 11 years, making his childhood chaotic. He graduated from the University of Oxford with a BA degree in literae humaniores, and has worked as a scriptwriter for the satirical television programmes The Thick of It, Have I Got News for You, Time Trumpet, and Last Week Tonight With John Oliver.

== Creation of political personae ==
Harvey stood against the prime minister, Theresa May, in her Maidenhead constituency at the 2017 general election. His character, Lord Buckethead – dressed in a black cloak over a spacesuit-style costume, with a tall, cylindrical black helmet with a thin visor – originated in the 1984 film Hyperspace, a low-budget Star Wars parody directed by Todd Durham. Harvey was inspired to adopt the persona after watching Hyperspace and learning that the character had contested the 1987 and 1992 general elections.

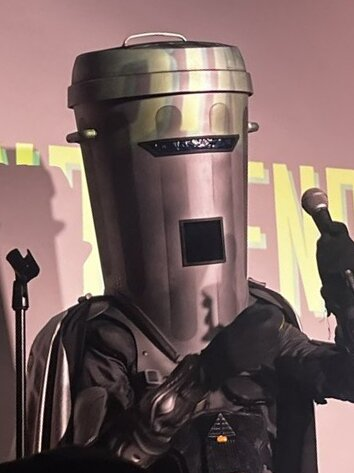
Harvey as Count Binface, at the Glee Club, Birmingham, in October 2024

Durham contacted Harvey and asserted his ownership of the Buckethead character following the 2017 election. Harvey turned over the Buckethead social media account to Durham, who then hired the film journalist David Hughes to take over the portrayal of the character. In response, Harvey introduced a new character, Count Binface, and stood against the prime minister, Boris Johnson, in Uxbridge and South Ruislip at the 2019 general election. Hughes and Harvey went for drinks afterwards, after which Hughes used the Buckethead Twitter account to announce that he was an "imposter" and to endorse Binface as "the true heir to the Buckethead throne". Harvey refuses interviews and defers to his alter ego when making public appearances. According to Hughes, Harvey "does actually genuinely believe that the absurdist element of British elections is kind of a cool one". Harvey himself proclaimed to the BBC that "My job is to celebrate and defend the wonders of British democracy".

Harvey has occasionally appeared in public under his own name rather than in character. In 2020 he made a rare appearance at the Cambridge Union, where he closed for the opposition to the motion "This House would rather be a Spartan than an Athenian". He debated against Paul Cartledge, who moved the motion; the historian Tom Holland closed for the proposition.

== Personal life ==
Harvey is married to the actress Sarah Daykin. They have two children: a son born in October 2021 and a daughter born in January 2026. Daykin is a drama graduate who previously performed as "Toby", a comedy duo with Lizzie, her younger sister by three years. Her other roles include Winky in the comedy series Chickens. The sisters have appeared as sidekicks of Count Binface on election nights.

Harvey had an elder brother, who was nine years his senior and whom Harvey was very close to; the brothers shared a love of sport, comedy and politics. Dan Harvey was found dead in his flat in June 2015 at the age of 43 by Jon. A post-mortem revealed that he was an undiagnosed diabetic and had died from a coma related to his condition. In his memoir, A Fan for All Seasons: A Journey Through Life (2023), Jon described how he coped with grief through sport. Although Dan supported Crystal Palace and bequeathed his brother his season ticket, Jon is a supporter of Tottenham Hotspur F.C..

== Works ==
=== Books ===
- A Fan for All Seasons: A Journey Through Life. London: Yellow Jersey Press. 2023. ISBN 9781787290587.

=== Radio and podcasts ===
- "Could an Ancient Athenian Fix Britain? (5-part series)". BBC Radio 4. 30 December 2019 – 3 January 2020. – As writer and narrator
- "Into the Sharkiverse". BBC Radio 4. 29 December 2025. – As writer and narrator
- "Rob Newman On Air". BBC Radio 4. 2026. – As writer

=== Musings ===
- "Christopher Nolan's Odyssey is a triumph". The Spectator. 18 July 2026.
