= Dark Sunday (1976 film) =

- Directed by: Jimmy Huston
- Written by: Howard Lee
- Screenplay by: Thom McIntyre (as Grey Lynelle)
- Produced by: Earl Owensby
- Starring: Earl Owensby; Monique Proulx; Phillip Lanier; Phil Rubenstein
- Cinematography: Jerry Crowder
- Music by: Arthur Smith; Clay Smith
- Release date: 1976
- Running time: 99 minutes
- Country: United States
- Language: English

Dark Sunday (also known as Soldier's Wrath and Retribution) is an American film by Jimmy Huston released in 1976. The Motion Picture Association of America (MPAA) threatened to give the film an "X" rating for violent content, then dropped it to an "R" rating before producer Earl Owensby's appeal was considered. Owensby screened the film as "not rated".

== Plot ==
In a small American town overrun by drugs and violence, a pastor tries to help young addicts get clean. One day, an addict decides to turn in his drug dealer. When the dealer's gang discovers this, they kill the young man and the pastor's family, and leave the pastor for dead. After regaining consciousness in the hospital, the pastor, now lame and mute, begins to execute the drug dealer's gang one by one.

== Cast ==
- Earl Owensby : Reverend James Lowery
- Monique Proulx : Julie
- Phillip Lanier : Blindman
- Ron Lampkin : Danny
- Phil Rubenstein : Lieutenant Untz
- Charles Honce : Detective
- Maggie Lauterer : Rachel Lowery
- Todd Reep : Eric Lowery
- Jeff Reep : Jody Lowery
- Sheree White : Ellie Palmer
- Carter Bland : Tim Spencer
- Chuck Mines : Candyman
- Herbert Greenberg : Candyman's driver
- Martin Beck : Herbert Trexler
- Jac Cashin : Benjamin
- Ralph Kerns : Doctor
- Mike Allen : Bartender

== Reception ==
Blueprint Review said, "This rare revenge drama/thriller was a bit of a downer and is overly glum throughout. However, for a grindhouse cheapie it’s pretty well made and fairly engrossing as a drama so it was a welcome addition to the weekend."
