= Damon's Law =

- Directed by: Thom McIntyre
- Written by: Thom McIntyre; Bill Park, Jr.
- Produced by: John Brock; Charles Heath; Earl Owensby
- Starring: Earl Owensby; Terry Loughlin
- Edited by: Jack Hofstra
- Music by: Dee Barton
- Release date: 1987
- Running time: 98 min
- Country: United States
- Language: English

Damon's Law (also known as The Rutherford County Line) is a 1987 American crime action film that follows the events and criminal cases that Sheriff Damon Huskey encounters while working for Rutherford County, North Carolina. Based on actual events, the film characterizes how Huskey, played by Earl Owensby, handles each case as well in some instances how they change his life forever.

== Plot ==
Set in Rutherford County, North Carolina, Damon's Law tells the story of Sheriff Damon Huskey's experiences as Sheriff of Rutherford County. He is portrayed as a man who is admired by his town and who is well respected. Huskey, played by Earl Owensby (who also produced the film), faces instances where he calms an uncontrollable prisoner, approaches an armed suspect, without his own weapon drawn, as well as an animal cruelty report that in turn ends with a child abuse case. Sheriff Huskey encounters previously released prisoners and also juggles his career and relationship with his family. As he protects the lives of his county citizens, maintains control and justice of suspects and criminals, Huskey also works in close relation to his brother, Deputy Roy Huskey (Terry Loughlin). Together with the other deputies, the Rutherford County men keep violence and criminal acts to a minimum. However, on the evening of May 31, 1979, an event takes place that changes Huskey's life personally and professionally, as well as all who live in Rutherford County forever.

On this night, the same as a local high school graduation, a call is placed to the Sheriffs Department by Charlotte Hutchins, the daughter of a well-known criminal in Rutherford County, James W. Hutchins (Dean Whitworth). She called because of a dispute she had with her father. Roy Huskey, and fellow deputy Owen Messersmith (Gene Kusterer) take the call. Hutchins is known throughout the community as a harmful and abusive man, and knowing this, Huskey and Messersmith head straight to the Hutchins residence. Upon arrival, James W. Hutchins guns down Deputy Huskey and Deputy Messersmith. He then leaves in his vehicle traveling away from his residence. He comes in contact with RL "Pete" Peterson (Steve Howard) while driving. Hutchins proceeds to gun him down as well on the side of the road, making Peterson his third victim. Hutchins then leaves his car and tries to hide in the woods. Damon soon receives word of the events and begins his own search for Hutchins. The following morning, with 200 men closing in on the woods where Hutchins ran, he surrenders. He is arrested and tried for murder. He is sentenced to death and chooses lethal injection.

== Cast ==
- Earl Owensby as Damon Huskey
- Terry Loughlin as Roy Huskey
- Marliyn Carter as Marjorie
- Cyndi Prevette as Ruth
- Rodney Orton as Junior
- Gene Kusterer as Owen Messersmith
- Dean Whitworth as James W. Hutchins
- CW Casey Jr. as Lawrence
- Steve Howard as RL "Pete" Peterson
- Barbara Hird as Hutchins' Wife
- Steve Saliby as Hutchins' son
- Heather Simmons as Hutchins' daughter

== Filming ==
Filmed on location in Rutherford County, North Carolina, and the Earl Owensby Studios, the largest independent studio in the southeast, located in Shelby, North Carolina.
