= Monique Proulx (racing driver) =

Canadian racecar driver (1947–2012)

- Born: February 23, 1947
- Died: August 12, 2012 (aged 65)
- Other name: Karine Louvier

Monique Proulx (23 February 1947 – 12 August 2012) was a teacher, model, journalist, entrepreneur, singer, actress, and racing driver from Québec. Early in both her singing and racing careers, she used "Karine Louvier" as her nom de scène or nom de course. She was the first woman to drive in a United States Grand Prix (USGP) event when she qualified in one of the support races in 1974.

== Early years ==
Proulx's father, a Québec City horse-trainer, died when she was two years old. Proulx also contracted polio at two years of age, resulting in her undergoing three operations on her legs, completed when she was 10, which left her with a limp until she was 13.

After studying education, she worked as a French teacher for 3½ years at the Commission scolaire de Laval.

== Modelling career ==
Proulx left teaching at 21 to become a model. She appeared in several advertising campaigns on both radio and television. Clients included the Molson and Labatt breweries, Hydro-Québec and Ford Canada. The campaign that gave her the most personal satisfaction was one for nylons because of her history with polio and the previous surgeries on her legs. She also became owner of a chain of salon/spas.

Proulx appeared in the "Girls of Canada" feature in the October 1980 issue of Playboy magazine, pictured in her racing suit sitting in her open-wheeled race car.

== Singing career ==
As a singer, Proulx released two singles in 1971 under the stage name "Karine Louvier": Mary Jane and Rever de Toi, and two other singles in 1982 as Monique Proulx: Les Hommes, les Astres, et Moi as a solo performer, and Corps Accord (Le Chant de la Sirène) as a duet with Pierre Saint-Onge.

== Films and television ==
In 1975 Proulx was the subject of a short film made with the support of l'Office du Film du Québec and Les Productions Mutuelles Limitée, directed by Robert Ménard. Titled "portraits de femmes — Monique Proulx", the film was released in 1976.

Proulx played the part of "Julie" in the American vigilante film "Dark Sunday", released in 1976.

In 1976 Proulx took part in the ABC Television athletic competition "Superstars", progressing to the Women's Preliminary round.

== Racing career ==
Proulx obtained her basic racing license at l'Association des Coureurs Automobile de Montréal (ACAM), then enrolled in the Jim Russell racing school at the Circuit Mont-Tremblant in 1970.

Initially the Canadian Auto Sports Club refused to grant her an international racing license. The dispute was finally resolved in court.

Proulx and Fortin formed Mojack Racing, and her early races were run in a modified BMW 2002 owned by Fortin, and a Datsun 240Z. She placed second in the Canadian Production endurance championship in the Datsun. That car was also used for ice racing. She finished eighth with the BMW at the Samair Trans-Am race in 1972 and fourteenth in 1973.

In 1974, when Northern NASCAR introduced the Mini Stocks class in Canada, Proulx won the very first race at Catamount Stadium track.

In 1972 she bought an open-wheeled Formula Ford. She raced in some Formula Ford and Formula Vee events, and was scouted by Fred Opert Racing, then moved up to Formula Atlantic in 1974 driving Allen Karlberg's March 712M with Kimberly-Clark as sponsor. She also was sponsored at some point by Virginia Slims. In 1975 she appeared in Formula Atlantic with sponsorship from Kotex's "New Freedom" brand products.

In Formula Atlantic Proulx drove a variety of cars including models from Ralt (RT1), Brabham (BT29), and Chevron. She raced Formula Atlantic until 1979.

In 1979 she also appeared in some Trans-Am events in a Chevrolet Camaro.

== Personal life ==
An accident in a Datsun 240Z on the streets of Montréal broke Proulx's leg in four places and sent her through the windshield.

Proulx's son Stéphane was born in December 1965.

Proulx was in a relationship with Doctor Jacques Fortin, whom she met on a ski hill.

In the early 1970s Proulx was romantically linked with Quebécois singer-songwriter Claude Dubois. This relationship ended in 1974.

When Stéphane also became a racing driver in the 1980s, Proulx retired from racing to support his career. Stéphane died in 1993 at the age of 27.

Proulx died on 12 August 2012 at age 65.
