= A Day of Judgment =

- Directed by: Charles Reynolds
- Screenplay by: Tom McIntyre
- Produced by: Earl Owensby
- Starring: William T. Hicks; Harris Bloodworth; Deborah Bloodworth
- Cinematography: Irl Dixon
- Edited by: James F. Laudenslager
- Music by: Arthur Smith; Clay Smith
- Distributed by: Earl Owensby Studios
- Release date: 1981
- Running time: 92 minutes
- Country: United States
- Language: English

A Day of Judgment is a 1981 American slasher film directed by Charles Reynolds, and produced by Earl Owensby. Its plot follows the residents of a Southern town in the 1920s that is visited by a Grim Reaper-like figure who begins a violent killing spree.

== Plot ==
In a small Southern town in the 1920s, the residents have slowly begun to break away from religious life, leaving the Reverend Cage's weekly sermons attended only by three devout elderly women. The Reverend Cage has chosen to leave the local church, and visits the local bank to negotiate a loan he has taken out, but finds himself a victim of usury from Mr. Sharpe, the unscrupulous head banker. Late that night, while departing the town, the Reverend encounters a cloaked figure on horseback brandishing a scythe pass by him on a covered bridge—the figure resembles that of the Grim Reaper.

The following day, Mrs. Fitch, an elderly alcoholic, harasses young children playing on her property, and also chastises her housekeeper, Alma. When the local sheriff fails to take Mrs. Fitch's complaints seriously, she poisons the children's pet goat, killing it. Meanwhile, George Clay, a local man who runs the service station his elderly parents own, dreams of abandoning his responsibilities. While at work, George openly tells his parents he aspires to sell the family business once they die. George consults Griggs, a local attorney, and tricks his parents into signing a power of attorney so he can sell the station and the family house, and send them to live on a poor farm.

Late at night, Mrs. Fitch hears the sound of a carriage outside her home. When she goes to investigate, she finds her beloved flower beds mysteriously dead. As she begins to sob, she is dragged into the ground by various disembodied hands that emerges from the earth. The next day, Morgan, an indigent widowed farmer, visits the bank to cash out funds gifted to him by the wealthy Jess Hill to purchase seed for his crops. Sharpe refuses, however, and later, Sharpe and the sheriff arrive to repossess Morgan's house, leaving him homeless. While inspecting the property, Sharpe is locked in a cellar by the cloaked figure, and subsequently attacked and killed.

Meanwhile, George's ex-fiancé, Missy, visits the service station with Griggs, and finds George inside, shaken and unable to speak. Nearby, Harvey Kaylor, the proprietor of the local clothing mercantile, prepares to leave town to purchase a lavish ring for his greedy and superficial younger wife, Ruby. Ruby, who is married to Harvey only for his money, is having an affair with Kenny, one of their employees. After Harvey leaves, Kenny visits their home to have sex with Ruby, but Harvey returns unexpectedly. Harvey and Kenny argue, and Kenny pushes Harvey into a fireplace mantel, causing him to hit his head and die. Ruby and Kenny place Harvey's body in his car and push it down an embankment, causing it to explode. Later that night, Ruby is terrified by a figure at the window. Lightning strikes the house, causing a fire, and both Ruby and Kenny are burned alive.

The Reaper's last victim is Charlie Milford, a crestfallen and jealous local businessman, who is convinced his wife, Grace, is having an affair with his superior, Sid Martin. Charlie's irrational jealousy has caused Grace to leave him, but Charlie has sustained a campaign of harassment against Sid. In a rage, Charlie kidnaps Sid and Grace, drives them into the woods, and executes them. Moments later, he is confronted by the Reaper, who decapitates him.

Each of the victims are seemingly led by the Reaper through darkness, and ultimately, into hell, but each suddenly awaken in their beds, terrified—the events that have led them to their damnation were all simply nightmares. Now, fearful of the damnation they foresaw, each seek absolution, and attend church to hear the new Reverend's sermon. They look on in terror when they see the new Reverend, who enters in a black cloak, but are relieved when he removes it and introduces himself, suggesting that he already knows some of them.

== Cast ==
- Richard Dedmon as Griggs
- Inga Dennis and Missy
- William T. Hicks as Sharpe
- William Gillespie as Mr. Clay
- Stan Hardin as Hill
- Bart Heavner as Craig
- Brownlee Davis as Charlie
- Harris Bloodworth as Sid Martin
- Helene Tryon as Mrs. Fitch
- Clara Lowry as Alma
- Bud French as Morgan
- Charles Reynolds as the Reverend Cage
- Careyanne Sutton as Ruby Kaylor
- Larry Sprinkle as Kenny

== Sources ==
- Albright, Brian (2012). Regional Horror Films, 1958-1990: A State-by-State Guide with Interviews. Jefferson, North Carolina: McFarland. ISBN 978-0-786-47227-7.
