= Statue of Darth Vader =

Statue in Odesa, Ukraine

- Artist: Alexander Milov
- Year: 2015
- Medium: Plaster and titanium alloy
- Subject: Darth Vader
- Location: Odesa; 46°28′11.7″N 30°40′22.9″E

The statue of Darth Vader (Ukrainian: Статуя Дарта Вейдера, romanized: Statuia Darta Veidera) is a plaster and titanium alloy statue in Odesa, Ukraine, depicting the Star Wars character Darth Vader. Originally a reinforced plaster statue of Vladimir Lenin, the sculpture was modified in 2015 by artist Alexander Milov as part of the process of decommunization in Ukraine.

== History ==
The statue of Vladimir Lenin was originally constructed on the site of the now-defunct Pressmash plant in Odesa, Soviet Ukraine. It was initially constructed with plaster, and due to damage sustained over time, was reinforced with a protective composite material of an undisclosed formula.

In 2015, decommunization laws took effect in Ukraine, leading to the removal of hundreds of Soviet-era monuments. The statue of Lenin in Odesa was planned to be removed, but the city chose to instead hire artist Alexander Milov to modify the statue in order to comply with the law and save it from destruction. He modified Lenin's coat into a cape and added a helmet over Lenin's head, turning the statue into Darth Vader. The statue's fist now holds a lightsaber hilt. The modifications were made with titanium alloy and attached with specialized glue, which fortified the original structure made with gypsum, which weakens over time. Local rumors claimed that the glue was the same type used in spaceship construction, and that it was provided by NASA.

The original head of Vladimir Lenin was left undamaged underneath the helmet so that it could be "exhumed" in the future if desired. "The Force" emits as a Wi-Fi signal from the helmet, which contains a Wi-Fi hotspot inside. In an interview with the BBC, Milov stated that he chose to turn the statue into Darth Vader because "at this moment Darth Vader is a political figure in Ukraine"; since 2012, various Ukrainian politicians had used the name and likeness of Darth Vader to run for office. Milov described the statue as the world's first monument to Darth Vader.
