= Hotel Transylvania (film) =

2012 American film by Genndy Tartakovsky

- Theatrical release poster
- Directed by: Genndy Tartakovsky
- Screenplay by: Peter Baynham; Robert Smigel
- Story by: Todd Durham; Dan Hageman; Kevin Hageman
- Produced by: Michelle Murdocca
- Starring: Adam Sandler; Andy Samberg; Selena Gomez; Kevin James; Fran Drescher; Steve Buscemi; Molly Shannon; David Spade; CeeLo Green
- Edited by: Catherine Apple
- Music by: Mark Mothersbaugh
- Production companies: Columbia Pictures; Sony Pictures Animation
- Distributed by: Sony Pictures Releasing
- Release dates: September 8, 2012 (TIFF); September 28, 2012 (United States)
- Running time: 91 minutes
- Country: United States
- Language: English
- Budget: $85 million
- Box office: $358.4 million

Hotel Transylvania is a 2012 American animated horror-comedy film directed by Genndy Tartakovsky, written by Peter Baynham and Robert Smigel, and featuring the voices of Adam Sandler, Andy Samberg, Selena Gomez, Kevin James, Fran Drescher, Steve Buscemi, Molly Shannon, David Spade, and CeeLo Green. It tells the story of Count Dracula (Sandler), who is the owner of Hotel Transylvania in Romania, where the world's monsters can take a rest from human civilization. When the "human-free hotel" is unexpectedly visited by a human traveler named Jonathan (Samberg), Drac must do everything in his power to prevent his daughter Mavis (Gomez) and the other guests from finding out that a human has found their safe place, which may jeopardize the hotel's future and his career.

As a first-time feature director, Tartakovsky set out to make a film that used his background in traditional animation to implement the physics of 2D in computer animation, inspired by the physical comedy of Tex Avery, and departing from the focus on realism that had become standard in CGI fare.

Hotel Transylvania premiered at the Toronto International Film Festival on September 8, 2012, and was theatrically released in the United States on September 28, by Sony Pictures Releasing. It received mixed-to-positive reviews from critics and grossed $358 million against a budget of $85 million. It was nominated for a Golden Globe for Best Animated Film. The financial success of Hotel Transylvania launched a multimedia franchise, including three sequels.

== Plot ==
In 1895, after his wife Martha was killed by an angry human mob, Count "Drac" Dracula commissions and builds a massive monsters-only hotel in Transylvania, then part of Austria-Hungary in which he raises his young daughter, Mavis. The hotel also serves as a safe haven and a getaway for the world's monsters from fear of human persecution. Drac's friends and famous monsters such as Frankenstein and his wife Eunice, Wayne and Wanda Werewolf and their massive immediate family, Griffin the Invisible Man, and Murray the Mummy often come to stay at the hotel.

In 2012, on Mavis's 118th birthday, she wants to finally see the human world. Drac allows her to leave the hotel, but he sets up an elaborate plan using his zombie bellhops disguised as humans to make them seem intimidating, and frighten her home. The plan works, but on their way back the zombies inadvertently lead a human, Jonathan "Johnny" Loughran, back to the hotel. Drac frantically disguises him as a Frankenstein-esque monster and passes him off as Frank's cousin "Johnnystein" so that he could lie about his arrival. Jonathan soon meets Mavis and the two ''zing''. Unable to get Johnny out of the hotel without any notice, Drac quickly improvises that Johnny is a party planner, brought in to bring a fresher approach to his own traditional and boring parties. Johnny quickly becomes a hit to the other monsters, but this worries Drac, who is both envious of Johnny's popularity and afraid that his friends will never return to the hotel if they find out the truth about him. Drac coerces Johnny to leave, but he is brought back by Mavis, who is unaware of Johnny's real species and feud with her father. After being shown the beauty of a sunrise by Johnny, Mavis is inspired to give humans another chance.

Meanwhile, the hotel chef Quasimodo Wilson, with the help of his pet rat Esmeralda, learns that Johnny is a human and kidnaps him to cook him as a "human pot pie". Drac intervenes and magically freezes Quasimodo to keep him from telling anyone that Johnny is human. Drac leads Johnny to his quarters and shows him a painting of Martha, allowing Johnny to realize why Drac built the hotel, became overprotective of Mavis, and his hatred for humans. Johnny then agrees to leave for good, but Drac, noticing that Mavis and Johnny's feelings for each other are real, persuades him to stay for the time being to avoid ruining Mavis's birthday. Drac and Johnny begin to bond and have fun together.

The party becomes a great success the next night and Mavis looks forward to opening a gift from Martha. However, when Johnny and Mavis share their first kiss, Drac overreacts, and in his outburst, inadvertently confesses to deceiving Mavis with the town. A still-frozen Quasimodo bursts in and fellow monster Mr. Fly reveals from his frozen speech that Johnny is a human disguised by Drac, who is guilty about his lie. The guests are shocked and outraged by the deceit at play but Mavis is undeterred and wants to be with Johnny. Johnny rejects her out of respect for her father and leaves the hotel. A heartbroken Mavis flies onto the roof with her mother's gift, and Drac follows in hopes of comforting her. He learns the present is a book about how he and Martha "zinged" and fell in love, and realizes he no longer knows mankind's true tolerance of monsters. After apologizing to the patrons, Drac persuades Frank, Wayne, Griffin, and Murray to head out into the human world to help him find Johnny, and with the scent-tracking ability of Wayne's daughter, Winnie, they learn that he is about to catch a flight back to the United States.

The five head to the airport, but are held up in a town celebrating a Monster Festival along the way. Frank attempts to scare away the assembled crowd of humans with a loud roar but instead receives wild applause and adoration. He then gets the humans to agree to help, and a team of men dressed as vampires provides Drac shelter from the sunlight while he rushes to the airport. Drac arrives to see Johnny's plane taking off, and he gives chase in bat form, burning in the sunlight. After getting Johnny's attention, Drac makes his way to the windshield of the plane and uses his mind-controlling power on the pilot to help him apologize over the plane's PA system, stating that Mavis has grown up and can make her own decisions. Johnny accepts his apology, and Drac manipulates the pilot to return to the Transylvanian airport. Drac returns Johnny to Mavis, announcing that he approves of Johnny. Johnny confesses to Mavis that their "zing" was mutual and the two kiss. The monsters finish celebrating Mavis's party, impressing the hotel guests.

== Voice cast ==
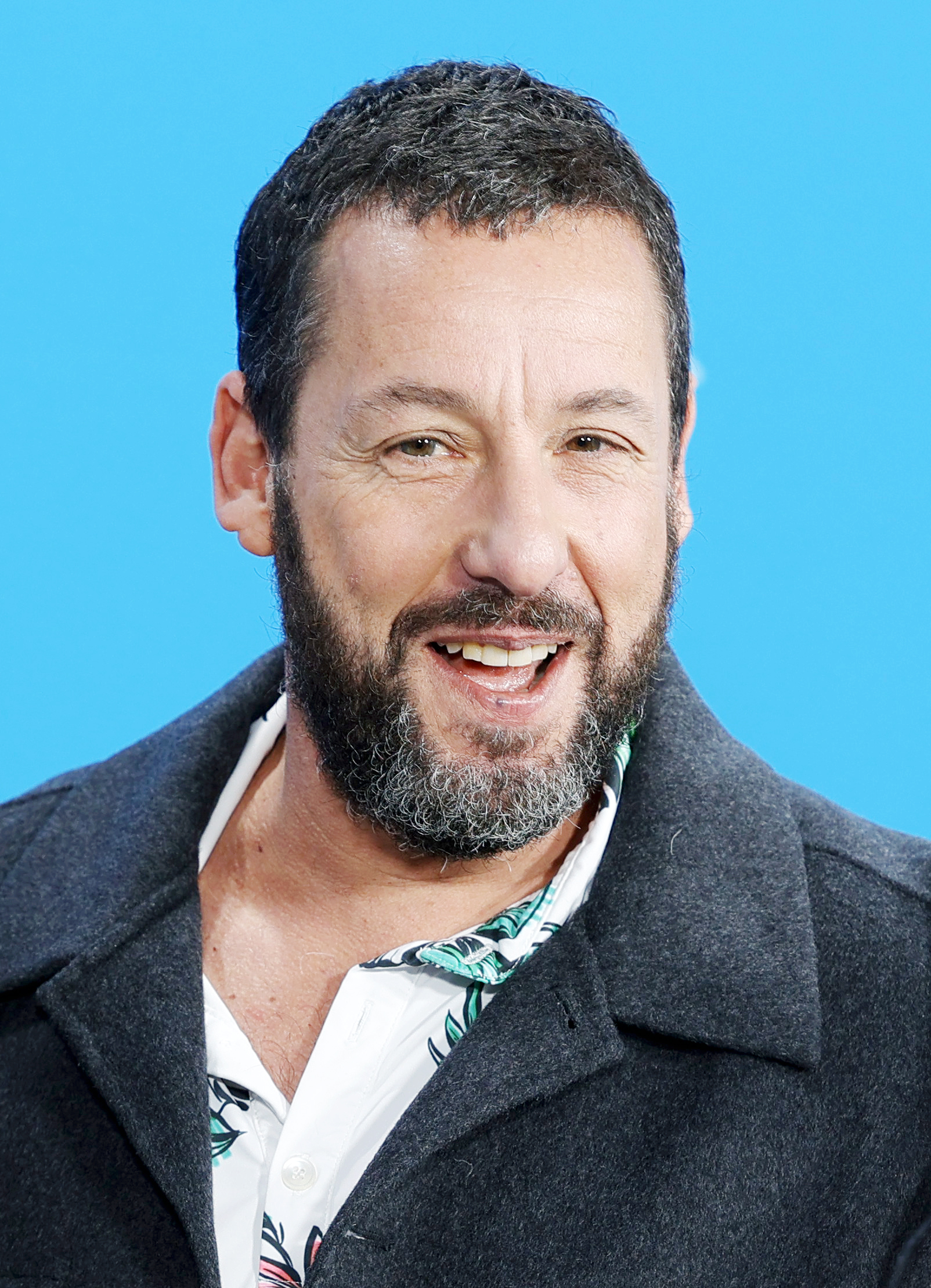
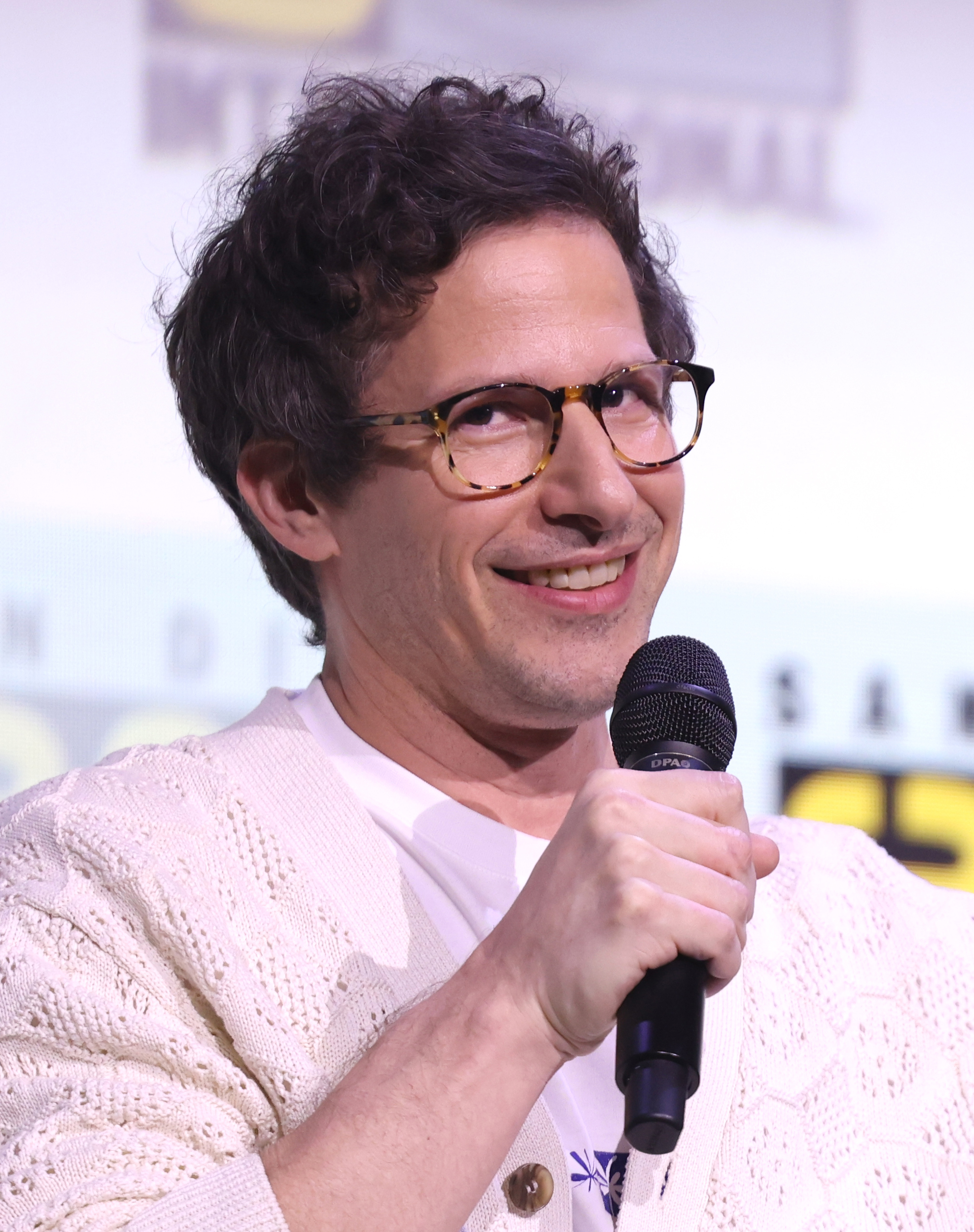
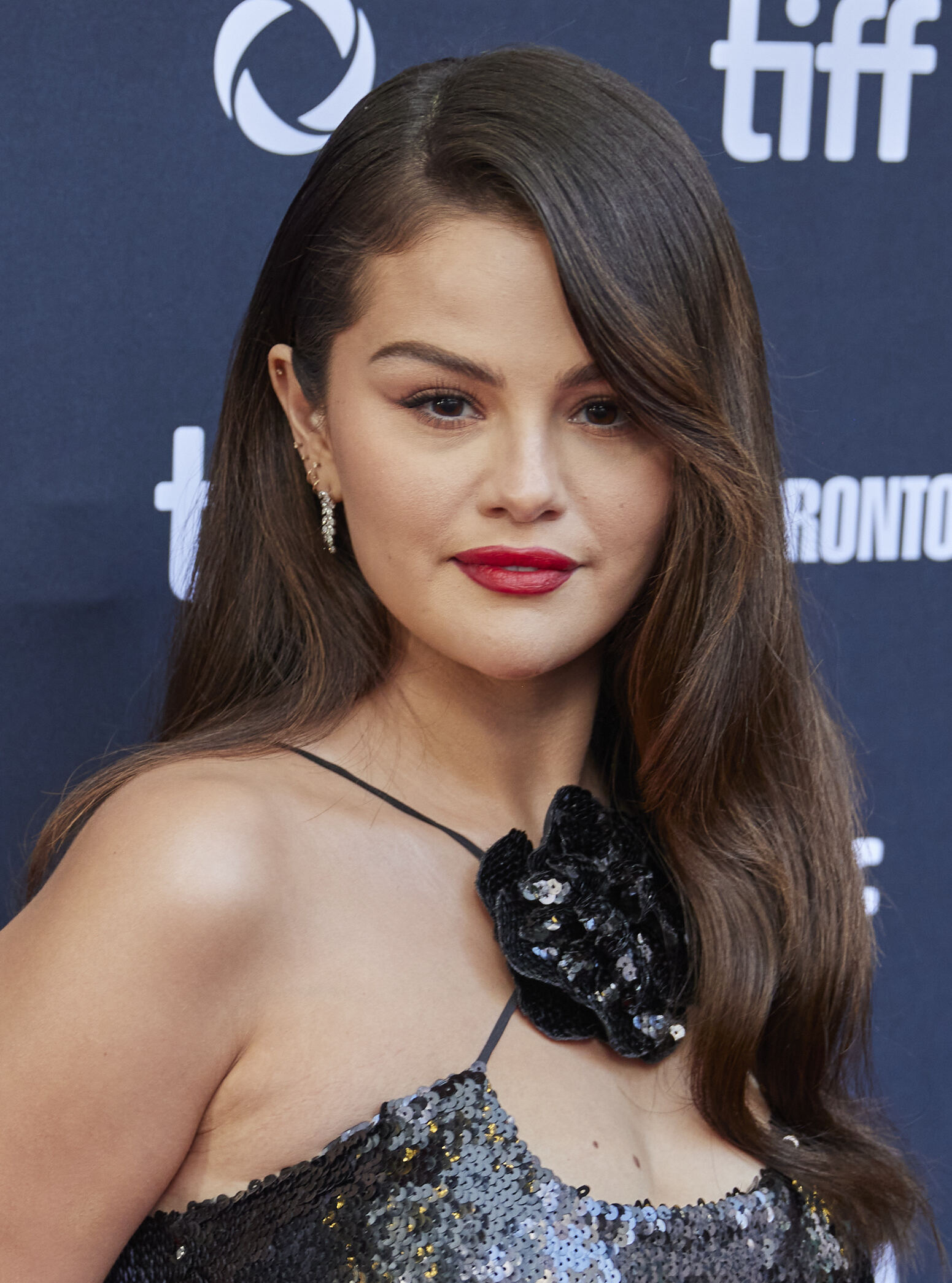
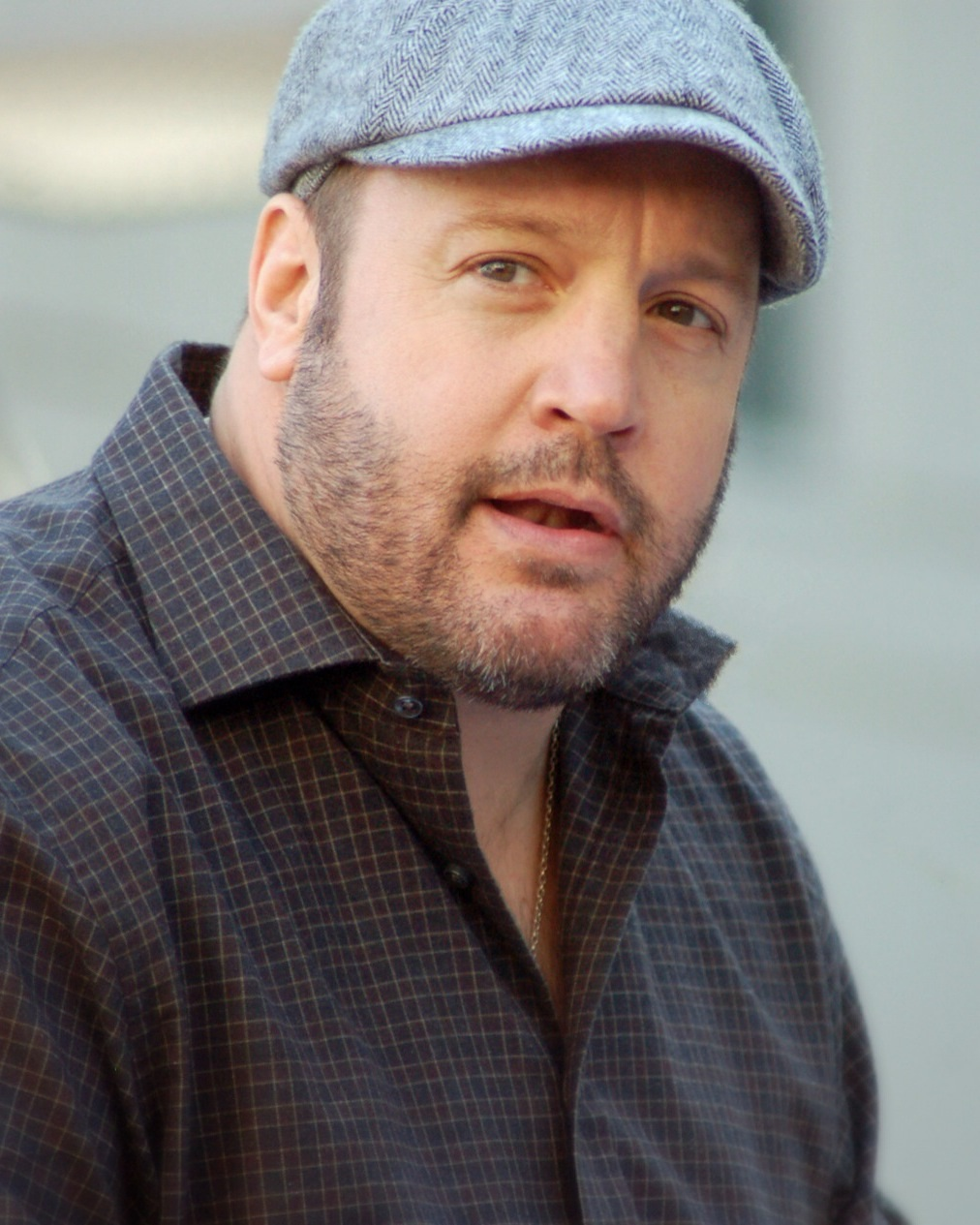
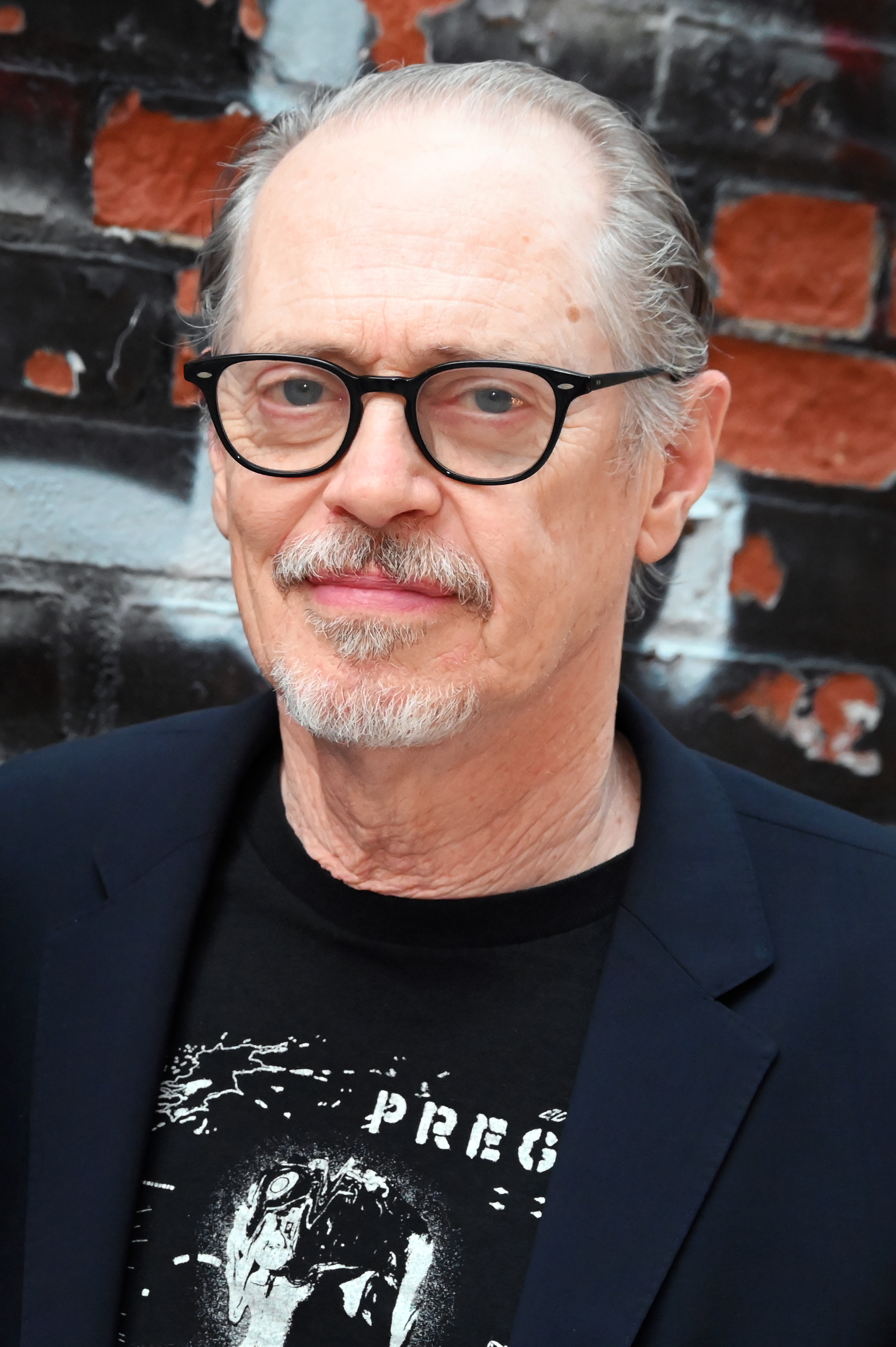
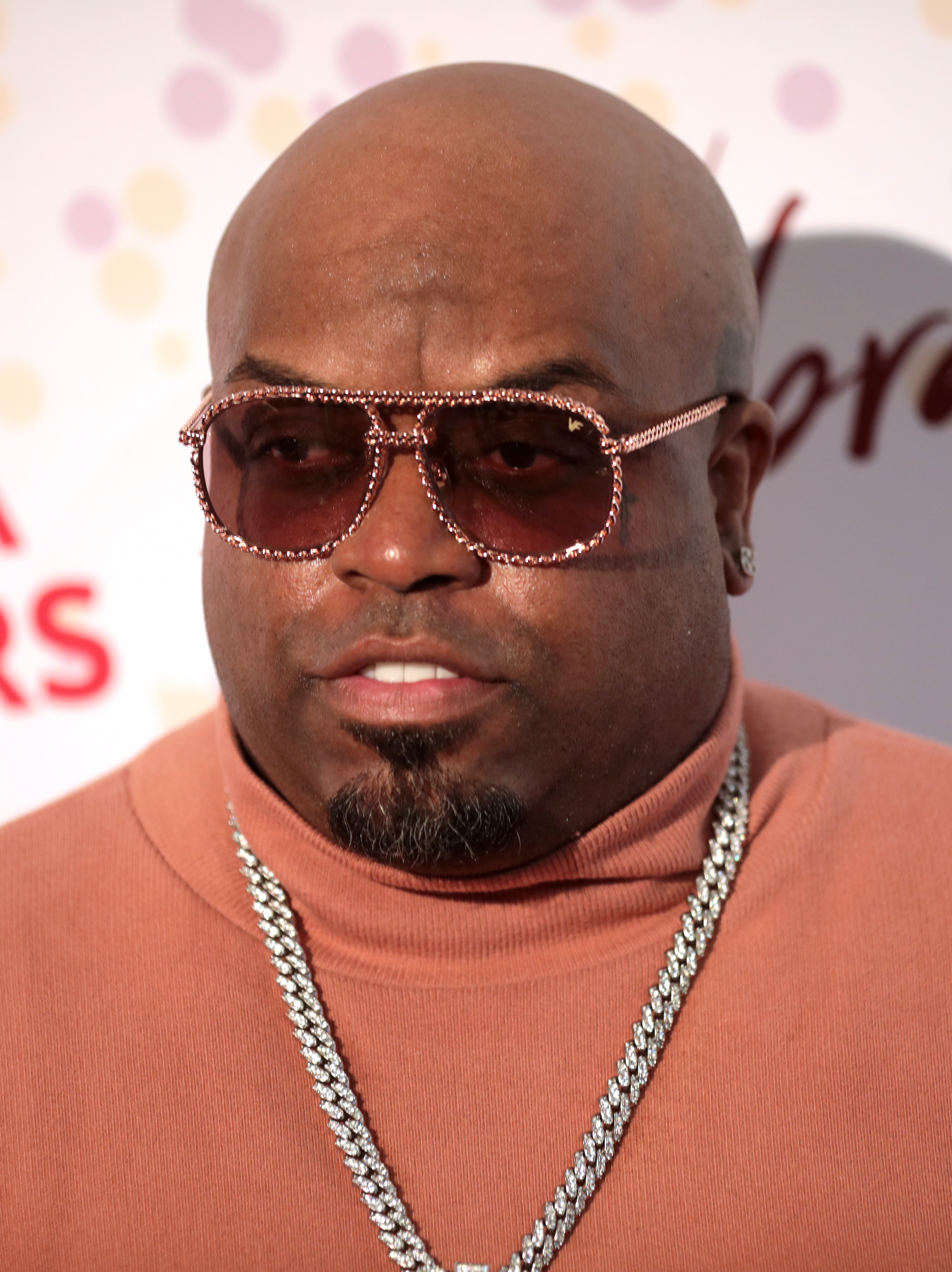
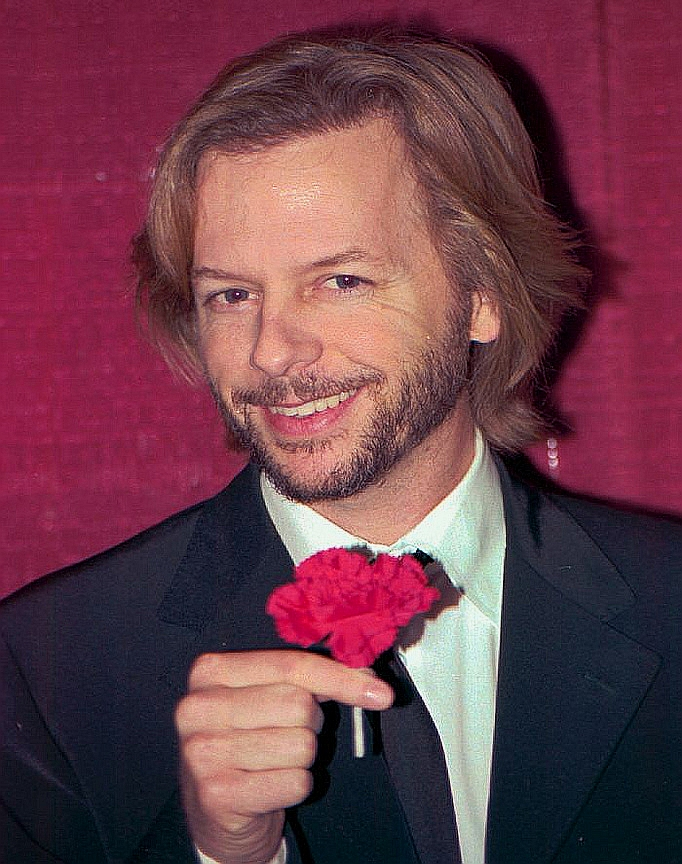
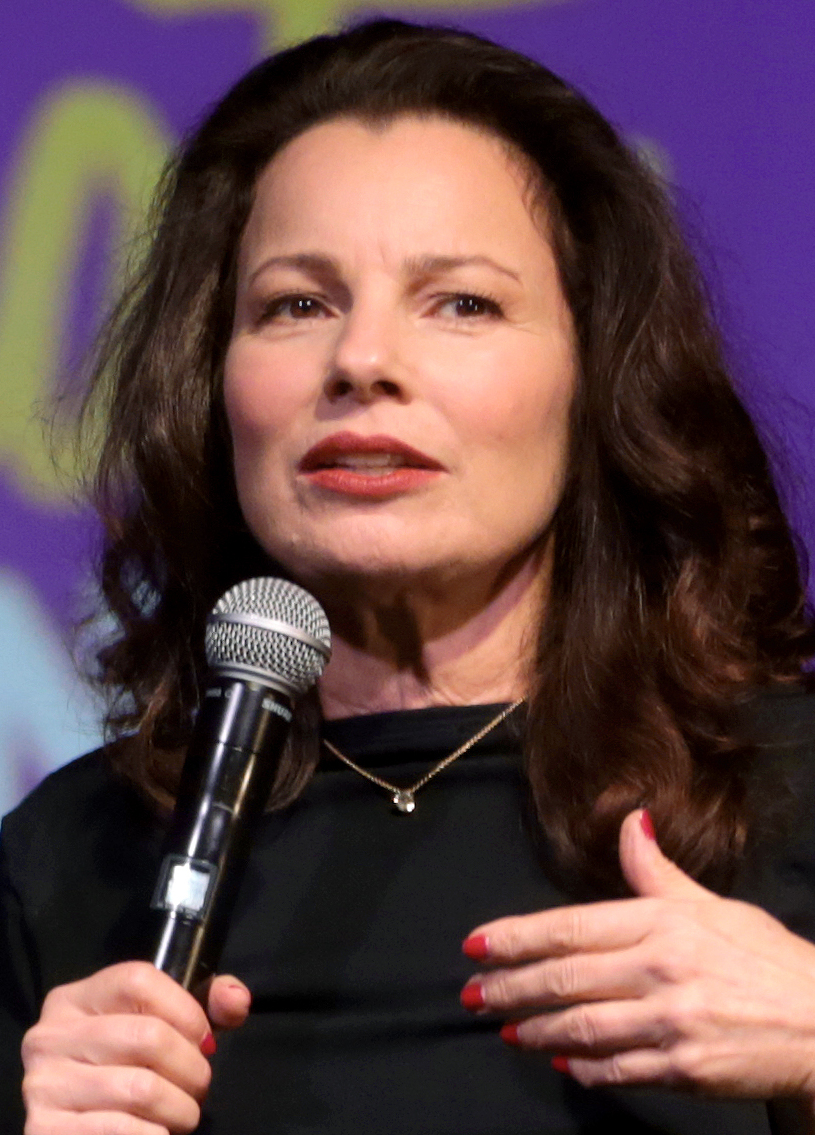
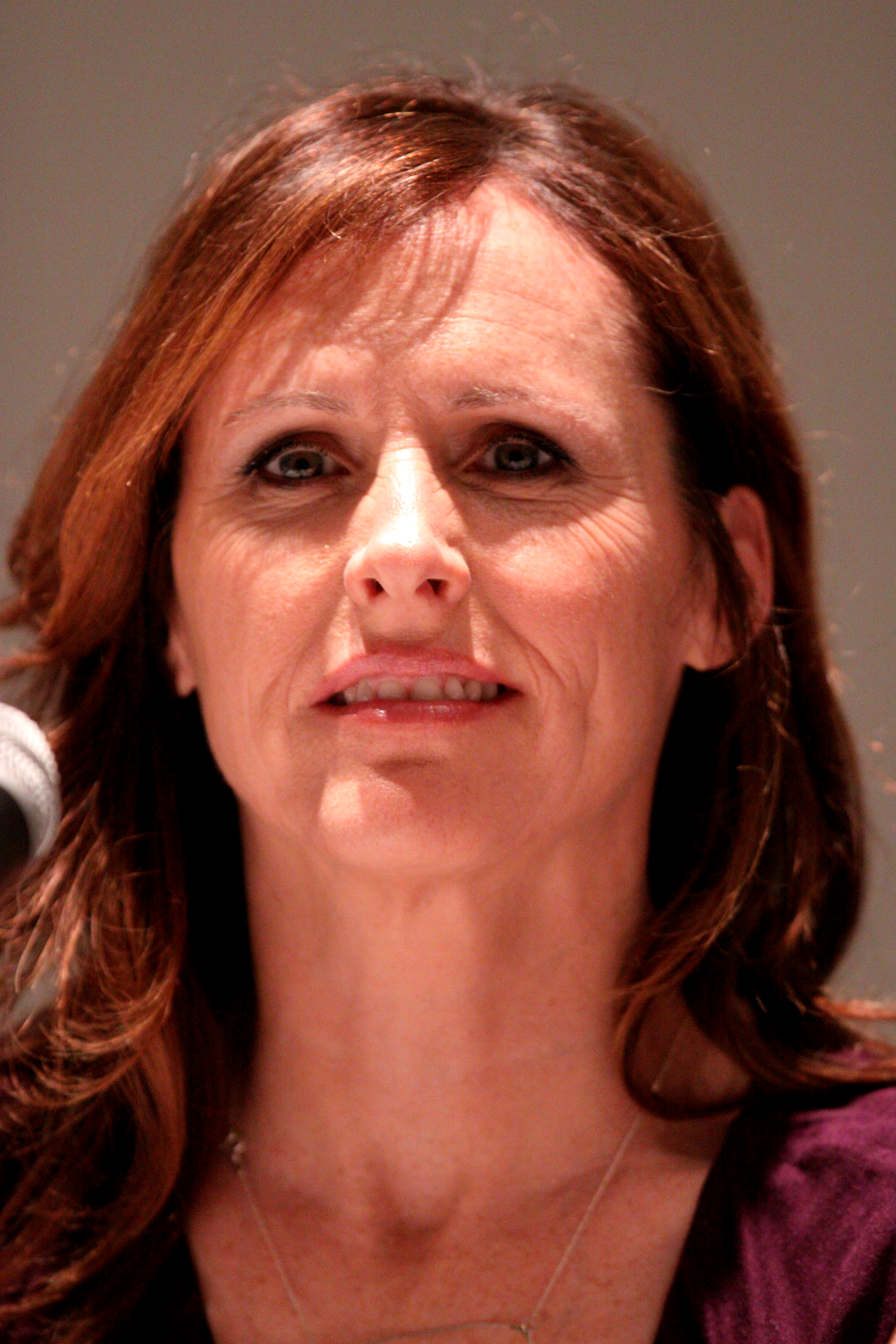
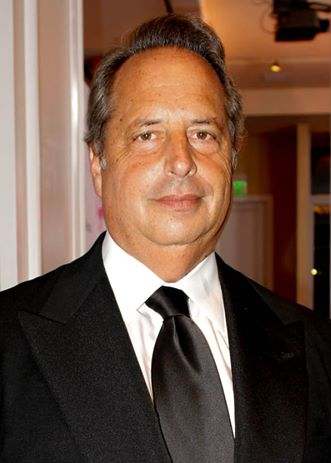
Top: Adam Sandler, Andy Samberg and Selena Gomez voice Count Dracula, Johnny Loughran, and Mavis

Middle: Kevin James, Steve Buscemi and CeeLo Green voice Frankenstein, Wayne, and Murray

Bottom: David Spade, Fran Drescher, Molly Shannon and Jon Lovitz voice Griffin, Eunice, Wanda, and Quasimodo Wilson
- Adam Sandler as Count "Drac" Dracula, a vampire and the owner of the hotel and Mavis's overprotective father.
- Andy Samberg as Jonathan "Johnny" Loughran, Mavis's love interest.
- Selena Gomez as Mavis Dracula, daughter of Count Dracula and late Martha, and Johnny's love interest.
  - Sadie Sandler as young Mavis Dracula, as well as Winnie, Wayne and Wanda's werewolf daughter.
- Kevin James as Frankenstein, one of Count Dracula's best friends who acts as an uncle to Mavis and mostly hangs out with Murray.
- Steve Buscemi as Wayne, a werewolf who is one of Count Dracula's best friends and Wanda's husband.
- CeeLo Green as Murray, a short, fat mummy who is one of Count Dracula's best friends and mostly hangs out with Frankenstein. He is later voiced by Keegan-Michael Key in the next three films.
- David Spade as Griffin the Invisible Man, one of Count Dracula's best friends.
- Fran Drescher as Eunice, Frankenstein's wife and Wanda's best friend.
- Molly Shannon as Wanda, a werewolf, Wayne's heavily pregnant wife and Eunice's best friend.
- Jon Lovitz as Quasimodo Wilson, a hunchbacked gourmet chef and the former bell-ringer of Notre-Dame who desires to make a dish with human as the main ingredient.
- Chris Parnell as Mr. Fly, Hotel Transylvania's fitness coordinator who can also translate any speech.
- Brian George as a suit of armor who acts as the head of Hotel Transylvania's security guards.
- Jim Wise and Luenell as the shrunken heads that serve as a "Do Not Disturb" sign on the door of Mavis's room.
- Brian Stack as a pilot who flies Jonathan's airplane back to America.
- Jackie Sandler as Martha, Dracula's wife and Mavis's mother who was killed by an angry mob when Mavis was an infant.
- Rob Riggle as Skeleton Husband
- Paul Brittain as Mr. Ghouligan, a zombie plumber.
- Brian McCann as Yeti

The heads of the Hydra named Mr. Hydraberg are voiced by Jim Wise, Paul Brittain, Jonny Solomon, Craig Kellman, and Brian McCann.

== Production ==
=== Development ===
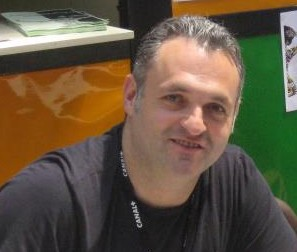
Director Genndy Tartakovsky presented a few scenes from the film at the 2012 Annecy International Animated Film Festival.

Hotel Transylvania was originally created and developed by comedy writer Todd Durham, which he based on his book of the same name; after creating the bible for a franchise of several films, television series, holiday TV specials, video games, books, merchandising, hotel chain, and theme parks, he took the package unsolicited to Columbia Pictures and set it up at Sony Pictures Animation where he became the first of several screenwriters on the project.

The development process ultimately went through six directors; in 2006, Anthony Stacchi and David Feiss became the first directors set to helm the film. They were replaced by Jill Culton in 2008, who was followed by Chris Jenkins, with Todd Wilderman in 2010. In February 2011, Genndy Tartakovsky, creator of Dexter's Laboratory, Samurai Jack, Star Wars: Clone Wars, and Sym-Bionic Titan took over as the sixth scheduled director, and made his feature directorial debut with the film.

In November 2011, Miley Cyrus was announced to voice Mavis, Dracula's teenaged daughter, but in February 2012, she was removed from the film. In August 2019, Cyrus admitted it was because of buying then-partner Liam Hemsworth a birthday cake in the shape of a penis and licking it. It was later announced that Selena Gomez would replace Cyrus. According to Tartakovsky his favorite Dracula was Bela Lugosi, especially in the context of Abbott and Costello. As a kid he really did not like horror movies, so he never really watched them. So he got introduced to all those characters through comedy, and so it was Abbott and Costello Meet Frankenstein and Meet the Mummy, etc. As Tartakovsky said [in relation to making Hotel Transylvania]: "I don't want to scare anybody. I just want to make them laugh with these iconic characters."

=== Animation and design ===
Tartakovsky, who originates from a traditional animation background, reimagined the film to follow the energy, organic nature, and exaggeration of 2D animation, particularly as seen in the work of director Tex Avery. "I took all the aesthetics I like from 2-D and applied them here," he said. "I don't want to do animation to mimic reality. I want to push reality." Tartakovsky's process involved drawing over character models in order to achieve exaggerated poses, hoping to "bring a 2D drawing sensibility into the CG world" and "push the expressions of the characters." Character animator Bill Haller remarked that "20% of the effort went into tweaking the rig to more of a hand-drawn pose" when creating most of the shots.

Visual effects supervisor Dan Kramer stated that because most of the film's assets were created under a different director, they were initially hesitant to take the character animation off model, but admitted that "when [Tartakovsky] did draw overs, it was freeing for the animators. And it's changed my viewpoint in being a little looser." Bill Desowitz of Animation World Network described the process as "creating new pipeline, breaking rigs and coming up with various deforming tweaks to get the right squash-and-stretch in CG." "I wanted to have an imprint so you'd go, 'Well, only Genndy can make this," Tartakovsky explained. "It's hard, especially with CG, but I feel there's a lot of moments that feel that they're very me, so hopefully it'll feel different enough that it has a signature to it."

== Soundtrack ==
- "Where Did the Time Go Girl (Party Version)" Written by Robert Smigel, Adam Sandler, and Dennis White. Produced by Static Revenger.
- "Daddy's Girl" Written by Adam Sandler and Robert Smigel. Performed by Adam Sandler.
- "Call Me Mavy" Performed by Traci L.
- "Problem (The Monster Remix)" Written by Henry Walter, Lukasz Gottwald, Becky G (as Becky Gomez) & will.i.am (as William Adams). Performed by Becky G featuring will.i.am.
- "Sexy and I Know It", performed by LMFAO
- "The Zing" Written by Adam Sandler, Robert Smigel, and Dennis White. Produced by Static Revenger. Performed by Adam Sandler, Andy Samberg, CeeLo Green, Kevin James, and Selena Gomez.
- "Helpless", written and performed by Peter Tvrznik
- "Sweet 118", written by Andy Samberg, Stuart Hart and Trevor Simpson. Performed by Andy Samberg.
- "Hush, Little Baby", performed by Adam Sandler.
- "Monster Mash", performed by Bobby Pickett.

== Release ==
=== Theatrical ===
Hotel Transylvania premiered on September 8, 2012, at the Toronto International Film Festival. The film received a wide release on September 28, 2012. On October 26, 2012, Regal Entertainment Group Cinemas began exclusively playing the traditionally animated short film Goodnight Mr. Foot before the film. Based on Hotel Transylvania, the short was directed and animated by Genndy Tartakovsky.

=== Home media ===
Hotel Transylvania was released on Blu-ray (2D and 3D) and DVD on January 29, 2013. It was accompanied by the short animated film, Goodnight Mr. Foot.

In April 2021, Sony signed a deal giving Disney access to their legacy content, including the Hotel Transylvania franchise to stream on Disney+ and Hulu and appear on Disney's linear television networks. Disney's access to Sony's titles would come following their availability on Netflix.

=== Box office ===
Hotel Transylvania earned $148.3 million in North America, and $210.1 million in other countries, for a worldwide total of $358.4 million. The officially reported budget for the film was $85 million, although Deadline Hollywood claimed that the film actually cost $104 million.

Hotel Transylvania topped the box office with $11 million on its first Friday, and $42.5 million domestically and $50.6 million worldwide for its opening weekend, which at the time of its release broke Sweet Home Alabama's record for the largest-grossing September opening, a record which was overtaken by its sequel Hotel Transylvania 2 in 2015, with a weekend gross of $48.5 million. The film also earned the highest-grossing domestic debut for Sony Pictures Animation (also later overtaken by Hotel Transylvania 2). According to Sony's president of worldwide distribution, Rory Bruer, Sony was very satisfied with the film's performance, which was "beyond anyone's imagination, and the holds are ridiculous. It exceeds expectations in every new market it opens in." Hotel Transylvania was theatrically released in China on October 28, 2013, more than a year after the worldwide premiere, and contributed $11,180,000 to the overall gross.

== Reception ==
Hotel Transylvania has an approval rating of 45% based on 142 professional reviews on the review aggregator website Rotten Tomatoes, with an average rating of 5.4/10. Its critical consensus reads, "Hotel Transylvania's buoyant, giddy tone may please children, but it might be a little too loud and thinly-scripted for older audiences." Metacritic (which uses a weighted average) assigned Hotel Transylvania a score of 47 out of 100 based on 32 critics, indicating "mixed or average" reviews. Audiences polled by CinemaScore gave the film an average grade of "A−" on an A+ to F scale.

IGN editor Geoff Chapman awarded the film a score of 9 out of 10, and wrote "This is a fun film, full of quirky gags and lovable characters. There are a few songs that smack a bit like soundtrack marketing for the kids, and the story is of course fairly predictable, but this movie is about enjoying a fun journey with great characters. It's a romp that kids and families will all enjoy. Hotel Transylvania is definitely somewhere you'll want to check in."

=== Accolades ===
Award	Category	Recipient	Result
Annie Awards	Best Animated Feature		Nominated
Annie Awards	Character Design in an Animated Feature Production	Carlos Grangel	Nominated
Annie Awards	Character Design in an Animated Feature Production	Carter Goodrich	Nominated
Annie Awards	Directing in an Animated Feature Production	Genndy Tartakovsky	Nominated
Annie Awards	Music in an Animated Feature Production	Mark Mothersbaugh	Nominated
Annie Awards	Production Design in an Animated Feature Production	Marcello Vignali	Nominated
Annie Awards	Voice Acting in an Animated Feature Production	Adam Sandler	Nominated
Annie Awards	Editorial in an Animated Feature Production	Catherine Apple	Nominated
Golden Globe Awards	Best Animated Feature Film	Genndy Tartakovsky	Nominated
Visual Effects Society	Outstanding Animation in an Animated Feature Motion Picture	Lydia Bottegoni, James Crossley, Mike Ford, Daniel Kramer	Nominated
Visual Effects Society	Outstanding Animated Character in an Animated Feature Motion Picture	Bill Haller, Tim Pixton, Jorge Vigara (for Dracula)	Nominated
Kid's Choice Awards	Favorite Voice from an Animated Movie	Adam Sandler (as Dracula)	Won

== Other media ==
=== Sequels ===
The sequel, titled Hotel Transylvania 2, was released on September 25, 2015. Its story takes place seven years after the first film, with the hotel now open to human guests, and its owner, Count Dracula, being more preoccupied with the fact that his 5-year-old grandson is not a pure-blood vampire. The original crew and cast returned for the film, except CeeLo Green as the role of Murray, who was replaced by Keegan-Michael Key. New additions include Mel Brooks as Dracula's father, Vlad; Nick Offerman and Megan Mullally as Jonathan's parents, Mike and Linda; and Asher Blinkoff as Mavis and Johnny's half-human/half-vampire son, Dennis.

Hotel Transylvania 2 was followed by Hotel Transylvania 3: Summer Vacation, released on July 13, 2018.

The fourth feature film in the series is Hotel Transylvania: Transformania, released as an Amazon Prime Video exclusive on January 14, 2022.

A fifth film is in development.

=== Television series ===
A television series based on the film premiered on June 25, 2017, and ended on October 29, 2020. Developed and produced by Nelvana Limited, in partnership with Sony Pictures Animation, the prequel series focused on the 114/115 years of Mavis and her friends at the Hotel Transylvania. Sony Pictures Television handled distribution in the United States, while Nelvana distributed the series outside the United States. It aired on the Disney Channel worldwide.

In June 2024, Motel Transylvania, a television series set to debut on Netflix in 2027, was announced. The series is set to focus on Dracula and Mavis opening a motel.

== See also ==
- List of films featuring Frankenstein
- Vampire film
