= Chain Gang (1984 film) =

- Directed by: Worth Keeter
- Written by: Worth Keeter; Todd Durham
- Produced by: Earl Owensby
- Starring: Earl Owensby; Carol Bransford; Leon Rippy
- Cinematography: Irl Dixon
- Music by: Dee Barton
- Release date: 1984
- Running time: 90 minutes
- Country: United States
- Language: English
- Budget: $1.5 million

Chain Gang, is a 1984 3D prison action film starring Earl Owensby, Robert Bloodworth and Carol Bransford with Leon Rippy. It was based on a true story.

== Plot ==
Framed for murder, Mac McPherson (Owensby) is sentenced to 15 years hard labor in Black Creek Prison Farm. McPherson breaks loose to prove his innocence and take down the corrupt system that set him up.
