= Hit the Road Running =

- Directed by: Worth Keeter
- Written by: Thom McIntyre
- Produced by: Earl Owensby
- Starring: Bill Gribble
- Edited by: Bruce Stubblefield
- Release date: 1983
- Running time: 92 minutes
- Country: United States
- Language: English

Hit the Road Running, is a 1983 3D action comedy film starring Bill Gribble with Leon Rippy. This was the third of six 3-D films produced by the Owensby Studios in the early 1980s. The film had a very limited theatrical run. Music performed by David Allen Coe.

== Plot ==
Beau Jim Donner returns to his hometown to find unscrupulous tycoon Sam Grady has been buying out locals and intimidating any opposition to his plans. Donner joins as deputy and sets out to thwart Grady.
