= Alexander Milov =

Ukrainian artist and sculptor

- Born: 1 April 1979 (age 46); Odesa, Ukraine
- Known for: Sculpture
- Notable work: Love; Statue of Darth Vader
- Website: milova.net

Alexander Milov (born 1 April 1979) is a Ukrainian artist and sculptor from Odesa. He is best known for creating Love, a large sculpture which was displayed at the 2015 Burning Man festival.

== Early life ==
Alexander Milov was born on 1 April 1979 in Odesa, Ukraine which was part of the USSR at the time of his birth. According to the artist's website, throughout his early life he experimented with art and with film. He began focussing on sculpting in 2000. In 2006 he began learning blacksmithing.

== Career ==
He is a Ukrainian sculptor, filmmaker, blacksmith, and designer. He is known for his Love sculpture which was featured at the 2015 Burning man festival in Nevada. In 2015 he garnered worldwide attention when he modified a Vladimir Lenin statue in Odesa, Ukraine. He transformed the statue into a statue of Darth Vader. In 2019 he created the sculpture Listen to the World and it was displayed at Vivid Sydney.

In 2021, he designed a 9-ton monument for Dubai, dedicated to the COVID-19 pandemic. It features 56 human figures of adults and children without mouths. The materials are polyester resin, concrete and stainless steel. The monument also featured same sex couples.

== See also ==
- List of Ukrainian artists
