= Love (Milov sculpture) =

2015 sculpture by Alexander Milov

- Artist: Alexander Milov
- Year: 2015
- Medium: Metal, Mesh, Plaster, Lighting
- Subject: Conflict and reconciliation
- Dimensions: (24 feet (7.3 m) in × 18 feet (5.5 m) in × 58 feet (18 m) in)

Love is a sculpture by Ukrainian artist Alexander Milov. The sculpture was featured at the 2015 Burning Man festival in Nevada, United States. The sculpture appears to represent two humans who are at odds, but each has an inner child attempting to connect with each other.

== History ==
Alexander Milov is a Ukrainian sculptor, blacksmith, and designer. Milov has said that he first came up with the idea for Love in 2007. He constructed the sculpture with dimensions of 75 by 45 by 175 centimetres (30 in × 18 in × 69 in). It was made of tape and wire and was put on display at the Kyiv Museum of Contemporary Art. The artist claimed that the sculpture "went unnoticed".

The sculpture was remanufactured on a much larger scale and it was featured at the 2015 Burning Man festival. In 2015 the art theme of Burning Man was "Carnival of Mirrors". Alexander Milov was the first Ukrainian to receive a grant to exhibit his art at the festival in 30 years. The sculpture depicts two wire-frame adults who appear to be alienated from one another, but inside of each figure there is the love of each figure's inner child which is represented by two opaque children reaching out to each other. Milov made the sculpture in Ukraine and shipped it to Nevada.

The sculpture was purchased by a winemaker from Hungary and it was eventually moved to Vál, Hungary in 2017. On the fourth of December 2018 a new Love sculpture was created in Ukraine and installed in Odesa, in front of a cinema.

== Design ==
The sculpture is made up of metal, mesh, plaster and lighting. It is 58 feet (18 m) long,18 feet (5.5 m) wide and 24 feet (7.3 m) high. The large wire figures are welded metal and the inner children are made from plaster. The lighting in the child figures is wired for 220 volts and operated by a generator.

The design features two large wire-framed human figures (man and woman) sitting back-to-back. Inside of each human figure is a figure of a child trying to reach the other child through the wires. At night the two children inside the figures light up. The two adult wire figures are slumped over and both appear to be sad. The dichotomy is represented by the two inner children who face each other, reach out and attempt to connect. According to the artist the sculpture represents the conflict between man and woman and the children (who glow at night) represent the purity and sincerity which gives them a chance to make up when dark times arrive.

== Reception ==
The sculpture has been called a "scene of conflict with hope and innocence rising from within." Boredpanda also called it a "powerful sculpture".
