= Stéphane Proulx =

Canadian racing driver (1965–1993)

- Born: December 12, 1965; Sainte-Adèle, Quebec, Canada
- Died: November 21, 1993 (aged 27); Sainte-Adèle, Quebec, Canada
- Occupation: Racing driver

Stéphane Proulx (December 12, 1965 – November 21, 1993) was a Canadian racing driver.

== Early life ==
Proulx was born in Sainte-Adèle, Quebec. His mother, Monique, was a Formula Atlantic driver in the 1970s and was one of the first women to be sponsored by a cigarette company. She gave up racing to support the career of her son.

== Career ==
Proulx won the 1987 Canadian Formula Ford 2000 Championship driving a Reynard 87SF for the Spenard-David Racing School. In nine races, he won six, took three pole positions and finished on the podium in every race.

In 1989, Proulx made the step up to Formula 3000, joining GA Motorsport bringing his Player's Ltd sponsorship with him. He drove a Lola T89/50 Cosworth DFV but had a difficult season adjusting to the power and to the new circuits. He finished fifth at Le Mans and finished the season 17th in the Championship with 2 points.

In 1990, Proulx stayed in Formula 3000 but switched to Pacific Racing. Pacific had lost their sponsorship from Philip Morris and so Stéphane's Player's Ltd funding was a welcome addition. Proulx was competitive but he failed to capitalise on it. A 12th at Donington was followed by accidents at Silverstone, Pau, Jerez, Monza and Enna-Pergusa. Tenth at Hockenheim in a rare finish was followed by gearbox failure at Brands Hatch. After two more accidents at Birmingham and Le Mans, he finished seventh at Nogaro in the final round.

In 1991, Proulx came back to Canada and drove a Swift tuned by Mauro Lanaro in the Canadian rounds of the IMSA Molson Formula Atlantic series, being declared the Canadian Formula Atlantic Champion, after a win in the last round at Vancouver.

In 1992, Proulx competed in five rounds of the French F3 Championship driving a Dallara F392 Alfa Romeo for Formula Project Racing.

== Later life ==
On April 3, 1993, while participating in a Formula Atlantic race at Phoenix International Raceway, Proulx was hit on his head by a wheel lost by another competitor. He sustained injuries from which he never recovered. Proulx died of complications resulting from HIV-related illness on November 21, 1993, in Sainte-Adèle.
