= Darth Vader in Ukrainian politics =

Use of Star Wars character

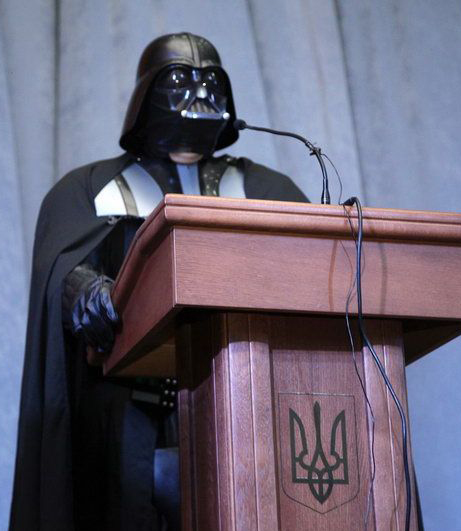
"Darth Oleksiiovych Vader", a candidate in 2014 Ukrainian presidential election

Since 2012, individuals adopting the name of the Star Wars character Darth Vader (Ukrainian: Дарт Вейдер) have entered local, presidential, and parliamentary elections in Ukraine. "Vader" also participated in political and social activism, notably in Odesa Oblast.

== History ==
On 14 February 2011, a man dressed as Darth Vader applied to the Odesa City Council for a free 10 acre plot of land. He explained that he had heard the council was giving away coastal land and wanted a share for himself, adding that "the city council members, the executive committee, and Mayor Kostusyev have turned to the Dark Side of the Force and will therefore help [him]." The man was later identified as local public figure Zhan Nikolaienko, who said he was inspired by a joking remark from a politician that corruption in the council was so bad that even Darth Vader would have been issued a state act of land there.

In July 2012, a man in a Darth Vader costume, wielding a chainsaw, "fought" against illegal parking lots near Odesa beaches.

On 28 October 2012, during the parliamentary election, a man dressed as Darth Vader was denied a ballot at a polling station because he refused to remove his helmet, claiming he would die without it. Immediately after this incident, "Vader" began campaigning for his son, Luke Skywalker, even though there was no such person on the ballot. Nearby, a man in a Chewbacca costume was also campaigning for Skywalker. According to media reports, Darth Vader was one of the most popular candidates listed on spoiled ballots in the 2012 election. Following the election, a billboard depicting Darth Vader with his hand on his heart and an inscription "Thank you for your trust!" was installed in Kyiv.

Since November 2012, Darth Vader was the first "deputy chairman" of the Internet Party of Ukraine. In December 2012, he distributed a "doomsday kit" to people at Maidan Nezalezhnosti, which included salt, soap, matches, toilet paper, condoms, light bulbs, as well as disks with the Ubuntu operating system and "evacuation tickets".

On 26 February 2013, "Darth Vader", accompanied by people dressed as Stormtroopers, attempted to hand over documents confirming the legitimacy of the Internet Party of Ukraine to the Minister of Justice.

In the 2014 presidential election, the Internet Party of Ukraine tried to nominate Darth Vader; but his registration was refused because his real identity could not be verified. Darth Vader was a candidate at the 25 May 2014 Kyiv mayoral election and the Odesa mayoral election of the same day for the party. In the 2014 Ukrainian parliamentary election the party let Darth Vader along other Star Wars characters such as Chewbacca, Padmé Amidala, and Yoda run for seats in the Ukrainian parliament.

In 2015, a statue of Vladimir Lenin in Odesa was converted into a statue of Darth Vader due to a law on decommunization. In the 2015 local elections, the Odesa City Election Commission registered a list of candidates for city council deputies from the political party "Darth Vader Bloc", in which 44 out of 48 people had the name and surname Darth Vader.

== Candidates ==
Among the people registered as Darth Vader who have been nominated for political positions in Ukraine were the following:

Name (Romanization)	Name in Cyrillic script	Date of birth	Election	Result (percent of votes)
Vader Darth Andriiovych	Вейдер Дарт Андрійович	1 November 1992	2014 parliamentary	2.6%
Vader Darth Vasyliovych	Вейдер Дарт Васильович	4 August 1989	2014 parliamentary	1.69%
Vader Darth Viktorovych	Вейдер Дарт Вікторович	4 October 1987	2014 Kyiv local	1.61%
Vader Darth Viktorovych	Вейдер Дарт Вікторович	4 October 1987	2014 parliamentary	0.36%
Vader Darth Viktorovych	Вейдер Дарт Вікторович	4 October 1987	2019 parliamentary	1.71%
Vader Darth Vitaliiovych	Вейдер Дарт Віталійович	9 September 1988	2014 parliamentary	1.42%
Vader Darth Volodymyrovych	Вейдер Дарт Володимирович	22 April 1979	2014 parliamentary	1.82%
Vader Darth Volodymyrovych	Вейдер Дарт Володимирович	5 August 1981	2014 parliamentary	2.3%
Vader Darth Volodymyrovych	Вейдер Дарт Володимирович	21 January 1984	2014 parliamentary	1.84%
Vader Darth Volodymyrovych	Вейдер Дарт Володимирович	8 August 1990	2014 parliamentary	1.47%
Vader Darth Volodymyrovych	Вейдер Дарт Володимирович	8 August 1990	2015 Mykolaiv local	1.11%
Vader Darth Volodymyrovych	Вейдер Дарт Володимирович	19 June 1991	2014 parliamentary	2.38%
Vader Darth Volodymyrovych	Вейдер Дарт Володимирович	19 June 1991	2015 Kherson local	0.96%
Vader Darth Ivanovych	Вейдер Дарт Іванович	18 March 1980	2015 Odesa Regional Council	2.16%
Vader Darth Leonidovych	Вейдер Дарт Леонідович	16 June 1990	2015 Kyiv local	0.62%
Vader Darth Mykolaiovych	Вейдер Дарт Миколайович	20 July 1982	2014 Odesa local	3.92%
Vader Darth Mykolaiovych	Вейдер Дарт Миколайович	20 July 1982	2015 Odesa local	1.83%
Vader Darth Mykolaiovych	Вейдер Дарт Миколайович	20 July 1982	2020 Odesa local	0.47%
Vader Darth Mykhailovych	Вейдер Дарт Михайлович	2 July 1980	2014 parliamentary	2.17%
Vader Darth Olehovych	Вейдер Дарт Олегович	18 February 1991	2014 parliamentary	3.96%
Vader Darth Olehovych	Вейдер Дарт Олегович	18 February 1991	2015 Kharkiv Regional Council	0.98%
Vader Darth Oleksandrivna	Вейдер Дарт Олександрівна	3 August 1994	2015 Odesa Regional Council	2.16%
Vader Darth Oleksiiovych	Вейдер Дарт Олексійович	10 January 1956	2014 presidential	refused
Vader Darth Pavlovych	Вейдер Дарт Павлович	29 October 1981	2014 parliamentary	2.23%
Vader Darth Stanislavovych	Вейдер Дарт Станіславович	29 October 1981	2014 parliamentary	1.99%
Vader Darth Yuriiovych	Вейдер Дарт Юрійович	22 September 1994	2015 Odesa Regional Council	2.16%

== See also ==
- Novelty candidate
- Count Binface
- Lord Buckethead
