= Lord Buckethead =

British novelty candidate

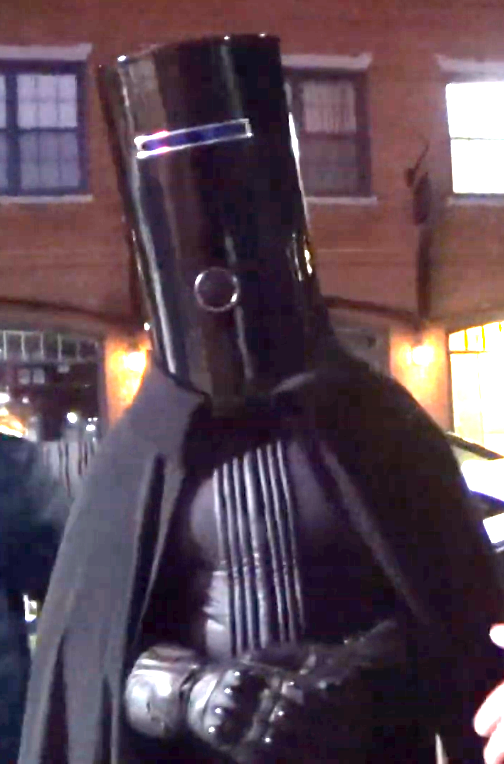
- Lord Buckethead in 2020
- First appearance: Hyperspace (1984)
- Created by: Todd Durham
- Portrayed by: Robert Bloodworth (Hyperspace, 1984); Mike Lee (1987, 1992); Jon Harvey (2017); David Hughes (2019)

In-universe information
- Gender: Male
- Occupation: Imperial Space Lord; Commander of the Woopian Star Fleet
- Nationality: British
- Political party: Gremloids (1987, 1992, 2017); Official Monster Raving Loony Party (2019)

Lord Buckethead was a novelty candidate who stood in four British general elections between 1987 and 2019, portrayed by three different people. Buckethead is an interstellar villain resembling the Star Wars character Darth Vader.

Lord Buckethead was created by the American filmmaker Todd Durham for his 1984 science fiction film Hyperspace. Mike Lee, the owner of the video distributor that released Hyperspace in the UK, stood as Lord Buckethead in the 1987 UK general election and again in the 1992 general election. The character went unused until the comedian Jon Harvey stood as Lord Buckethead in the 2017 general election; his televised appearance standing next to prime minister Theresa May went viral, drawing media coverage and an online following.

Following the 2017 election, Durham asserted his ownership of the Lord Buckethead character and displaced Harvey. With Durham's authorisation, Lord Buckethead returned in 2019, now played by David Hughes. He appeared at People's Vote rallies calling for a second Brexit referendum and stood in the 2019 general election representing the Monster Raving Loony Party. In 2026, Hughes said he was finished as Lord Buckethead. Harvey continues to campaign using his own character, Count Binface, standing in the 2026 Clacton by-election.

== History ==
=== Origins ===
Lord Buckethead was created by the American filmmaker Todd Durham for his 1984 film Hyperspace, a low-budget parody of science fiction films such as Star Wars. In the film, Lord Buckethead, a galactic villain similar to the Star Wars character Darth Vader, was played by Robert Bloodworth.

=== Mike Lee period (1987—1992) ===
In the UK, Hyperspace was released as Gremloids by the video distributor VIPCO, owned by Mike Lee. To market Gremloids, in the 1987 general election, Lee stood as Lord Buckethead as a novelty candidate, representing the Gremloids Party. He stood against the Conservative prime minister Margaret Thatcher in her constituency in Finchley, London. Buckethead campaigned to demolish Birmingham to make way for a spaceport. He received 131 votes. In the 1992 general election, Lord Buckethead stood against the Conservative prime minister John Major in Huntingdon, winning 107 votes (0.1%).

=== Jon Harvey period (2017) ===
In 2017, the former TV producer Jon Harvey stood as Lord Buckethead against Theresa May in Maidenhead in the 2017 general election. He decided to use Lord Buckethead after watching Gremloids and discovering that he had been used in earlier elections. Harvey paid a friend to make the costume and achieved the 10 signatures required by approaching people in a Costa Coffee in a cinema. He received 249 votes (0.4%), Buckethead's highest proportion yet.

Lord Buckethead's televised appearance standing next to May went viral. In a tongue-in-cheek article, The Guardian gave Lord Buckethead a "Best Policy" award for a manifesto pledge to bring back the teletext service Ceefax. A few days after the election, Lord Buckethead appeared on the American talk show Last Week Tonight with John Oliver, campaigning to lead the Brexit negotiations. Harvey created a Twitter account for the character, drawing hundreds of thousands of followers. The Guardian wrote that Lord Buckethead was part of a British tradition of novelty candidates, many of them belonging to the Official Monster Raving Loony Party.

Lord Buckethead made a surprise appearance at Glastonbury Festival in June 2017, introducing the band Sleaford Mods. That year, he released a Christmas single, "A Bucketful of Happiness", accompanied by a music video.

=== Copyright dispute (2018) ===
Following the 2017 election, Durham contacted Harvey and asserted his ownership of Lord Buckethead. According to Harvey, Durham instructed him to give him the password to the Twitter account. Harvey acquiesced as he could not afford a legal challenge and did not know his legal rights. Durham said he welcomed authorised applications to stand as the character in future British elections: "My Lord Buckethead character has always been the voice of the people, so my feeling is to let the people be his voice."

In 2018, Durham said he had been "involved to some extent" with all of Buckethead's political activities since 1987. Harvey disputed this, saying Durham had had no involvement with his period as Buckethead. Harvey said he had enjoyed his time as Buckethead, and said: "It’s a wonderful expression of British democracy that once every four or five years all these powerful characters are reduced to having to stand in a sports hall with whoever." He created a new character, Count Binface, who first stood in elections in 2019. In a 2022 article in Time Out, the new stand-in David Hughes acknowledged the irony of a director who had created a Star Wars knock-off threatening copyright enforcement against Harvey.

=== David Hughes period (2019) ===
Durham enlisted the film journalist David Hughes to play Lord Buckethead. The Lord Buckethead Twitter account became active again in 2019. That year, Lord Buckethead, now played by Hughes, appeared at People's Vote rallies calling for a second Brexit referendum. In April, Buckethead crowdfunded £15,000 to stand against Nigel Farage for South East England MEP in the May 2019 European Parliament Elections. The bid was abandoned for fear it could take votes away from parties campaigning for the UK to remain in the EU. Durham said the money was returned.

For the general election in December 2019, Buckethead represented the Official Monster Raving Loony Party, standing against prime minister Boris Johnson in his constituency of Uxbridge and South Ruislip. He won 125 votes (0.3%). Harvey also stood in the election as Count Binface, winning 69 votes. After Hughes and Harvey went for drinks afterwards, Hughes used the Lord Buckethead Twitter account to announce that he was an "imposter" and to endorse Count Binface as "the true heir to the Buckethead throne". In 2026, Hughes said many people had asked him to stand as Buckethead at the 2026 Clacton by-election, but that he had finished with the character.

== Platform ==
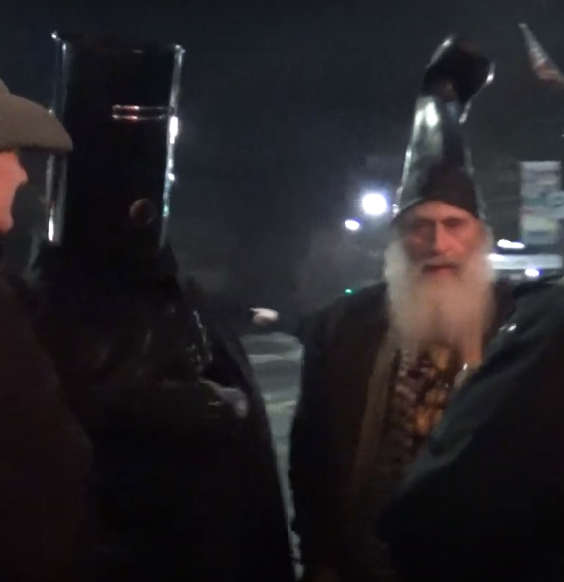
Lord Buckethead alongside the American novelty candidate Vermin Supreme

=== 2017 ===
Lord Buckethead's manifesto in the 2017 election promised "strong, not entirely stable leadership", a reference to the Conservatives' slogan "strong and stable". The following promises were included:

- The abolition of the House of Lords, with the exception of Lord Buckethead
- Nuclear weapons: "A firm public commitment to build the 100-billion-pound renewal of Britain's Trident weapons system, followed by an equally firm commitment, privately, not to build it. They're secret submarines, so no one will ever know. It's a win-win"
- Free bicycles for all to "combat obesity, traffic congestion, and bike theft"
- Reducing the voting age to 16 and restricting voting beyond the age of 80
- Instead of Theresa May's commitment to bring back grammar schools, Buckethead would build "gamma" schools founded on three principles: "One, better funding for teachers, to attract bright graduates. Two, increased facilities for children, especially playing fields. Three, if any child misbehaves three times, they are blasted into deep space, with the parents provided with a lovely fruit basket, by way of consolation or celebration, depending on the child. Discipline is key"
- A referendum on whether or not to have another Brexit referendum
- Legalise the hunting of fox hunters
- Nationalise the pop singer Adele
- Exile of right-wing columnist Katie Hopkins to the "Phantom Zone"
- Regeneration of Nicholson's Shopping Centre, Maidenhead
- The cessation of arms sales to Saudi Arabia so that Britain can purchase laser weaponry from Lord Buckethead

=== 2019 ===
Lord Buckethead's 2019 election manifesto included the following promises:

- Nigel Farage to be sold for parts
- Isaac Newton's laws of gravity to be negotiated
- All doorways to be increased by 1 foot (30 cm) in height
- Political debates to include a swimsuit competition
- Pass a law to require all men with various spellings of Alistair to pick one spelling
- Shepherd's pies required to contain at least 10% shepherd
- The third dimension to be extended so a fourth dimension could be provided by 2030
- Giving money to the Royal Astronomical Society to rename Uranus to something less embarrassing
- Replace the House of Lords with a Palace of the Supreme Galactic Overlord
- The Prime Minister's salary to be based on job performance as with all career criminals

== Electoral history ==
General election 1987: Finchley
Party	Candidate	Votes	%	±%
Conservative	Margaret Thatcher	21,603	53.9	+2.8
Labour	John Davies	12,690	31.7	+4.9
Liberal	David Howarth	5,580	13.9	−7.3
Gremloids	Lord Buckethead (Note: Portrayed by Mike Lee)	131	0.3	N/A
Gold Party	Michaelle St Vincent	59	0.2	N/A
Turnout		40,063	69.4	+0.4

General election 1992: Huntingdon
Party	Candidate	Votes	%	±%
Conservative	John Major	48,662	66.2	+2.6
Labour	Hugh Seckleman	12,432	16.9	+3.0
Liberal Democrats	Andrew Duff	9,386	12.8	−8.3
Liberal	Paul Wiggin	1,045	1.4	N/A
Green	Deborah Birkhead	846	1.2	−0.2
Monster Raving Loony	Screaming Lord Sutch	728	1.0	N/A
Conservative Thatcherite	Michael Flanagan	231	0.3	N/A
Gremloids	Lord Buckethead	107	0.1	N/A
Forward to Mars Party	Charles S. Cockell	91	0.1	N/A
Natural Law	David Shepherd	26	0.0	N/A
Turnout		73,554	79.2	+5.2

General election 2017: Maidenhead
Party	Candidate	Votes	%	±%
Conservative	Theresa May	37,718	64.8	−1.0
Labour	Pat McDonald	11,261	19.3	+7.4
Liberal Democrats	Tony Hill	6,540	11.2	+1.3
Green	Derek Wall	907	1.6	−2.0
UKIP	Gerard Batten	871	1.5	−6.9
Animal Welfare	Andrew Knight	282	0.5	N/A
Gremloids	Lord Buckethead (Note: Portrayed by Jon Harvey)	249	0.4	N/A
Independent	Grant Smith	152	0.3	N/A
Monster Raving Loony	Howling Laud Hope	119	0.2	N/A
CPA	Edmonds Victor	69	0.1	N/A
The Just Political Party	Julian Reid	52	0.1	N/A
Independent	Yemi Hailemariam	16	0.0	N/A
Give Me Back Elmo	Bobby Smith	3	0.0	N/A
Turnout		58,239	76.4	+3.8

General election 2019: Uxbridge and South Ruislip
Party	Candidate	Votes	%	±%
Conservative	Boris Johnson	25,351	52.6	+1.8
Labour	Ali Milani	18,141	37.6	−2.4
Liberal Democrats	Joanne Humphreys	3,026	6.3	+2.3
Green	Mark Keir	1,090	2.3	+0.4
UKIP	Geoffrey Courtenay	283	0.6	−2.8
Monster Raving Loony	Lord Buckethead (Note: Portrayed by David Hughes)	125	0.3	N/A
Independent	Count Binface	69	0.1	N/A
Independent	Alfie Utting	44	0.1	N/A
Independent	Yace Yogenstein	23	0.0	N/A
Independent	Norma Burke	22	0.0	N/A
Independent	Bobby Elmo Smith	8	0.0	N/A
Independent	William Tobin	5	0.0	N/A
Turnout		48,174	68.5	+1.7

== See also ==
- Darth Vader in Ukrainian politics
