= Todd Durham =

American filmmaker and writer

- Occupations: Filmmaker; comedy writer; novelist
- Notable work: Hotel Transylvania franchise (creator); Hyperspace AKA Gremloids; Visions of Sugar-Plums; Mr. Smith Goes To Hell
- Website: ToddDurham.com

Todd Durham is an American filmmaker, comedy writer, and novelist, best known as the creator of the concept for the Hotel Transylvania film franchise. Durham's works, including over forty screenplays and books, frequently combine fantasy storylines with character comedy.

== Education and career ==
Durham studied comedy writing at USC under brothers Danny Simon and Neil Simon.

In 1983, based on a half-hour 35mm film that he wrote and directed, Earl Owensby Studios, a North Carolina movie studio, signed Todd Durham to a three-picture feature deal. Durham then wrote and directed: Tales of the Third Dimension, Chain Gang, and a low-budget comedy film, Hyperspace, starring Chris Elliott and Paula Poundstone.

=== Lord Buckethead ===
The film Hyperspace was the first appearance of the "intergalactic spacelord" Lord Buckethead. To promote Hyperspace, in the UK, released as Gremloids, Mike Lee, the video distributor, stood as Lord Buckethead, as a novelty candidate, representing the Gremloids Party, against the Conservative prime minister Margaret Thatcher in her constituency in Finchley, London in the 1987 general election. Buckethead campaigned to demolish Birmingham to make way for a spaceport. He received 131 votes. In the 1992 general election, Lord Buckethead stood against the Conservative prime minister John Major in Huntingdon, winning 107 votes (0.1%).

In 2017, the former TV producer Jon Harvey stood as Lord Buckethead against Theresa May in Maidenhead in the 2017 general election. In 2017, Durham asserted his ownership of the character, and subsequent incarnations have been authorized by him.

== Writer ==
Durham signed with Rick Jaffa, then agent at William Morris, and worked as an uncredited script doctor on comedy projects. He wrote screenplays for comedy actors, directors, and producers, the National Lampoon film franchise, and Saturday Night Live alumni. Durham ghostwrote celebrity autobiographies, and authored his first novel, Mr. Smith Goes to Hell, and its screenplay adaptation.

=== Hotel Transylvania ===
During his years as a studio script doctor, Durham came up with the concept of Hotel Transylvania and brought it to Sony Pictures Animation. The first film in the series, Hotel Transylvania, was released in 2012 with mixed reviews from critics.
