= Earl Owensby Studios =

American-based film and television film studio

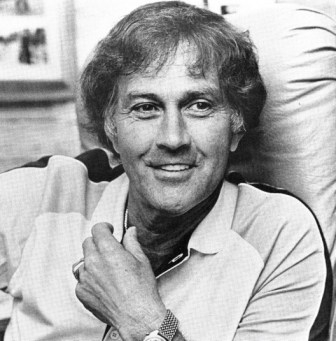
- Type: Film/television production company
- Industry: Motion pictures
- Founded: 1974
- Founder: Earl Owensby
- Headquarters: Shelby, North Carolina, U.S.
- Website: earlowensbystudios.com

Earl Owensby Studios (shortened to E.O. Studios) is an American-based film and television film studio that was founded in 1974 by producer/actor Ernest Earl Owensby (born 1935). The studio was responsible for the development, production, and distribution of dozens of low-budget action films (distributed mostly to outdoor Drive-in and Grindhouse theaters). Owensby discovered that although his films may have lacked widespread mainstream appeal, international audiences latched on to his brand of filmmaking.

== Notable films ==
On November 10, 1973, producer/actor Earl Owensby began production on his first feature film, the revenge actioner Frank Challenge: Manhunter. Directed by Martin Beck, the film starred Owensby as Frank Challenge, a candidate for the U.S. Senate who takes the law into his own hands after the murder of his family. Distributed in 1974 by Cinemation Industries to a reported 134 markets, Challenge proved to be quite profitable, leading directly to the establishment of E.O. Studios, a 200-acre motion picture facility located in Shelby, North Carolina.

The following year, E.O. followed up Challenge with a sequel entitled The Brass Ring, (1975) with Owensby returning as the vengeful hero Frank Challenge. The film was later retitled as Manhunter for television release.

Over the next four years, E.O. released one film per year starring Owensby: Dark Sunday (1976), Death Driver (1977), Buckstone County Prison (1978), and Wolfman (1979). The ultra-violent Dark Sunday made national news headlines after the Motion Picture Association of America’s ratings board refused to approve the film, essentially making it an X rated film). E.O. appealed the ruling and asked for a "G-Rating on principle" and it was released with an R rating.

In 1980, E.O. produced two films, both with a musical theme and featuring Ginger Alden, who had been the fiancée of Owensby's friend Elvis Presley at the time of Presley's death. The first film, called Lady Grey, was the studio's first film to not star Owensby; The lead male role instead went to country music star David Allan Coe), while the second film, entitled Living Legend: The King of Rock and Roll, saw Owensby back on screen, portraying a character known as Eli Canfield, who bore a striking resemblance to Elvis. The soundtrack for Living Legend film was provided by another Presley friend, Roy Orbison. Orbison spent six months living in North Carolina while recording the soundtrack for this film.

In an interview with Morley Safer on CBS’s 60 Minutes, Owensby explained that E.O. Studios’ success was due to never spending more than a million dollars to make a film and never signing a distribution deal that would net them less than eight million. That proved to be a sound strategy over the course of the next decade, as E.O. continued to crank out such profitable—though under-the-radar—films as A Day of Judgment (1981), Rottweiler: Dogs of Hell (1982), Hit the Road Running (1983), Hot Heir (1984), Tales of the Third Dimension (1984), Chain Gang (1984), The Last Game (1984), Hyperspace (also known as Gremloids, 1985), The Rutherford County Line (1986), and Order of the Black Eagle (1987). The films typically weren't given wide distribution beyond Drive-In circuits in the Southeastern United States.

== Partnering with James Cameron ==
In 1988, E.O purchased the unfinished, abandoned Cherokee Nuclear Power Plant, just outside Gaffney, South Carolina, with an eye towards turning it into a studio. The studio soon partnered with director James Cameron, who filled one of the plant's reactors with water to shoot his sci-fi epic The Abyss (1989). It was, at that time, the world's largest underwater sound stage.

== Recognizable talent ==
Though E.O. used mostly unknown talent in its productions, many well-known names came through its doors. 1984's Hyperspace, which E.O. produced in conjunction with Regency Productions, featured comedians Paula Poundstone and Chris Elliott, while the action film Hooch (1977) starred Gil Gerard, known for his turn on the TV show Buck Rogers in the 25th Century and Danny Aiello. The Oscar-nominated 1984 film Reuben, Reuben, starring Tom Conti and Kelly McGillis, though not produced by the studio, filmed on the studio's lot as did 1987's Florida Straits (with Raul Julia and Fred Ward). Director Worth Keeter, who directed eight films for E.O., went on to be a regular director for the Power Rangers franchise.
