= Tales of the Third Dimension =

1984 film

- Directed by: Earl Owensby; Worth Keeter; Thom McIntyre; Todd Durham
- Written by: Worth Keeter; Thom McIntyre; Todd Durham
- Produced by: Earl Owensby
- Starring: Robert Bloodworth; Kevin Campbell; William T. Hicks
- Cinematography: Irl Dixon
- Edited by: Matthew Mallinson; Bruce Stubblefield
- Music by: Dee Barton
- Release date: 1984
- Running time: 85 minutes
- Country: United States
- Language: English

Tales of the Third Dimension is a 1984 3D comedy horror anthology film starring Robert Bloodworth, Kevin Campbell and William T. Hicks. It comprises three tales directed by Worth Keeter, Thom McIntyre, and Todd Durham. They are introduced by skeleton host 'Igor' in wraparound sequences directed by Earl Owensby.

== Plot ==
=== Young Blood ===
Miss Marquette, an adoption agent, agrees to a highly unorthodox home visit with prospective parents outside of office hours, much to the disapproval of her colleague Dudley. She is unable to explain her decision beyond being inexplicably moved by the client's voice. The pair arrive at night at a dilapidated mansion, where they are greeted by the enigmatic Count and Countess. The couple express a strong desire to adopt a child and ask the agents to bypass standard procedures. While Miss Marquette is charmed and willing to proceed, Dudley remains skeptical. To prove their capability as caregivers, the Count and Countess telepathically summon four children who are already in their care.

Some time later, Miss Marquette prepares to deliver a new child to the Count and Countess. Despite Dudley's warning that the boy has a reputation as a "problem child," she proceeds. The boy, intelligent and seemingly well-mannered, is shown to his room. Meanwhile, Miss Marquette is rewarded with a vampiric bite from the Count. Later, the Count listens as the Countess reads a frightening story to the child, though he is unable to determine why the boy was considered problematic. The boy, showing signs of unusual hairiness, transforms into a werewolf and attacks the Count and Countess, killing both. By morning, he has returned to human form, and Dudley arrives to retrieve him, revealing that the boy is his son.

=== The Guardian ===
Nigel, a local gravedigger, returns home after a burial to find two uninvited drifters, Charley and Freddie, waiting for him. Over drinks, the pair prod Nigel into sharing tales of the dead and the valuables they may have taken to their graves. That night, Charley and Freddie exhume the body of a recently buried young woman, removing a valuable ring by severing her finger.

Unsatisfied with their small haul, Charley recalls rumors of hidden catacombs beneath an old, sealed church. The next day, the pair confront Nigel again and, after threats and violence, force him to reveal the secret entrance. Inside, they loot several tombs until Charley betrays Freddie, leaving him trapped beneath a fallen stone. Venturing deeper alone, Charley soon meets the tomb’s true guardians: swarms of flesh-hungry rats.

=== Visions of Sugarplums ===
In the week before Christmas, young siblings Susy and Dennis are left in the care of their elderly grandmother, who uses a wheelchair, while their parents travel for the holidays. Initially, the children appear comfortable with the arrangement, as their grandmother is generally kind when she takes her medication. However, it soon becomes apparent that she has run out of her prescription, and her behavior begins to deteriorate.

Over the following days, the children experience increasing instability from their grandmother, exhibiting signs of paranoia, confusion, and aggression. The situation escalates when they attempt to call their parents, only to be intercepted by their grandmother on another phone line. She falsely claims that the plane carrying their parents has crashed, leaving the children to believe they are now completely alone.

On Christmas Eve, the grandmother suffers a complete psychological break. Armed with a shotgun, she begins pursuing Susy and Dennis throughout the house. When she exhausts her ammunition, she arms herself with a pair of hedge clippers and continues the chase. In the final moments, Santa Claus appears and intervenes, magically ejecting the grandmother up the chimney and out into the night, saving the children.
