= Hot Heir =

- Directed by: Worth Keeter
- Written by: Thom McIntyre; C. Vincent Shortt
- Produced by: C. Vincent Shortt
- Starring: Curtis Credel; Dianne Beatty; Ron Campbell
- Cinematography: Irl Dixon
- Edited by: Bruce Stubblefield
- Release date: February 1984
- Running time: 90 minutes
- Country: United States
- Language: English
- Budget: $1,230,100

Hot Heir, also known as The Great Balloon Chase, is a 1984 3D comedy film starring Curtis Credel, Dianne Beatty, Ron Campbell. It was the second of six 3D movies produced by Earl Owensby during the 1980s.

The Freedom Weekend Aloft festival was specially created in order to bring together the hot air balloons necessary for filming. It subsequently became an annual event.

== Plot ==
After the death of his wealthy uncle, and with his inheritance at stake, Heir Pennington (Curtis Credel) becomes involved in a balloon race.
