= Hyperspace (film) =

1984 science fiction comedy film

- The UK theatrical release poster under the title Gremloids, depicting Lord Buckethead
- Directed by: Todd Durham
- Written by: Todd Durham
- Produced by: Earl Owensby
- Starring: Chris Elliott; Paula Poundstone; Alan Marx; Robert Bloodworth
- Cinematography: Irl Dixon
- Edited by: Bruce Stubblefield
- Music by: Don Davis
- Distributed by: Earl Owensby Studios
- Release date: 1984
- Running time: 86 minutes
- Country: United States
- Language: English

Hyperspace, also known as Gremloids, is a 1984 3D science fiction comedy film starring Chris Elliott and Paula Poundstone, written and directed by Todd Durham and filmed in Shelby, North Carolina. This was the sixth and final 3-D film produced by the Owensby Studios in the 1980s.

The film is an early parody of the 1977 space opera film, Star Wars. It introduced Lord Buckethead, the visage of whom later became a satirical perennial candidate at British elections.

== Plot ==
A Star Wars–style text crawl explains how a resistance force led by Princess Serina has stolen vital radio transmissions from an evil Galactic Alliance. The Darth Vader–like villain, Lord Buckethead (named only in the closing credits), pursues Serina, but, due to an error in navigation, instead lands on Earth.

Lord Buckethead then leads his Jawa-like minions into the nearby suburb while none-the-wiser of his blunder. He immediately mistakes town folk such as Chester, the local baker, for a galactic hero called Captain Starfighter; and again later Karen, an employee at a local transmission repair shop, for Princess Serina, promptly abducting her for interrogation.

Max, a timid exterminator aspiring to pass a crucial exam for a shot at executive promotion, inadvertently finds himself at the scene and aids Karen in escaping. The duo makes a hasty retreat into the woods, only to be captured and brought aboard the aliens' ship.

The minions eventually realize that they have erred, and arrived on the wrong planet. Unfortunately, attempts to convey this to the arrogant Lord Buckethead are met with harsh consequences due to his intolerance for insubordination, often resulting in execution.

Despite the setbacks, Max and Karen manage to escape once more. After a chaotic adventure in a superstore, they eventually arrive just in time for Max's important exam. However, their respite is short-lived as Lord Buckethead arrives, seizing Karen and demanding the coveted radio transmissions. Failure to comply would mean the destruction of the entire town.

The military arrives but is easily pushed back by the spaceship's superior defenses. Max meanwhile takes the opportunity to sneak aboard Buckethead's ship and rescue Karen. The two make it off just as the ship is preparing for lift-off. Lord Buckethead's minions meanwhile have had all they can take from his arrogance and bullying abuse, and literally kick him off the ship as he stands on the main boarding ramp, marooning him on Earth.

He then pursues and corners Max and Karen, but is killed by Chester, who appears in a Superman style outfit, revealing that he actually is Captain Starfighter. The film finally ends with the alien spaceship flying away from Earth.

== Cast ==
- Chris Elliott as William Hopper
- Paula Poundstone as Karen
- Alan Marx as Max
- Robert Bloodworth as Lord Buckethead
- R.C. Nanney as Chester

== Production ==
Comedy actor Chris Elliott was cast in the lead role while he was still appearing in the television show Late Night with David Letterman.

Hyperspace was originally to be distributed by MGM, although the release did not go ahead. It was released in the UK under the title Gremloids.

== Legacy ==
The Gremloids Party is a fictitious political party that has run a candidate called Lord Buckethead in three of the United Kingdom general elections. The candidate is shown wearing a bucket-like mask on his head. Buckethead ran against Margaret Thatcher for parliament in Finchley in 1987 (receiving 131 votes), against John Major in Huntingdon in 1992 (107 votes), against Theresa May in Maidenhead in 2017 (249 votes) and against Boris Johnson in Uxbridge and South Ruislip in 2019 (125 votes).
