= Novelty candidate =

Satirical or protest political candidate

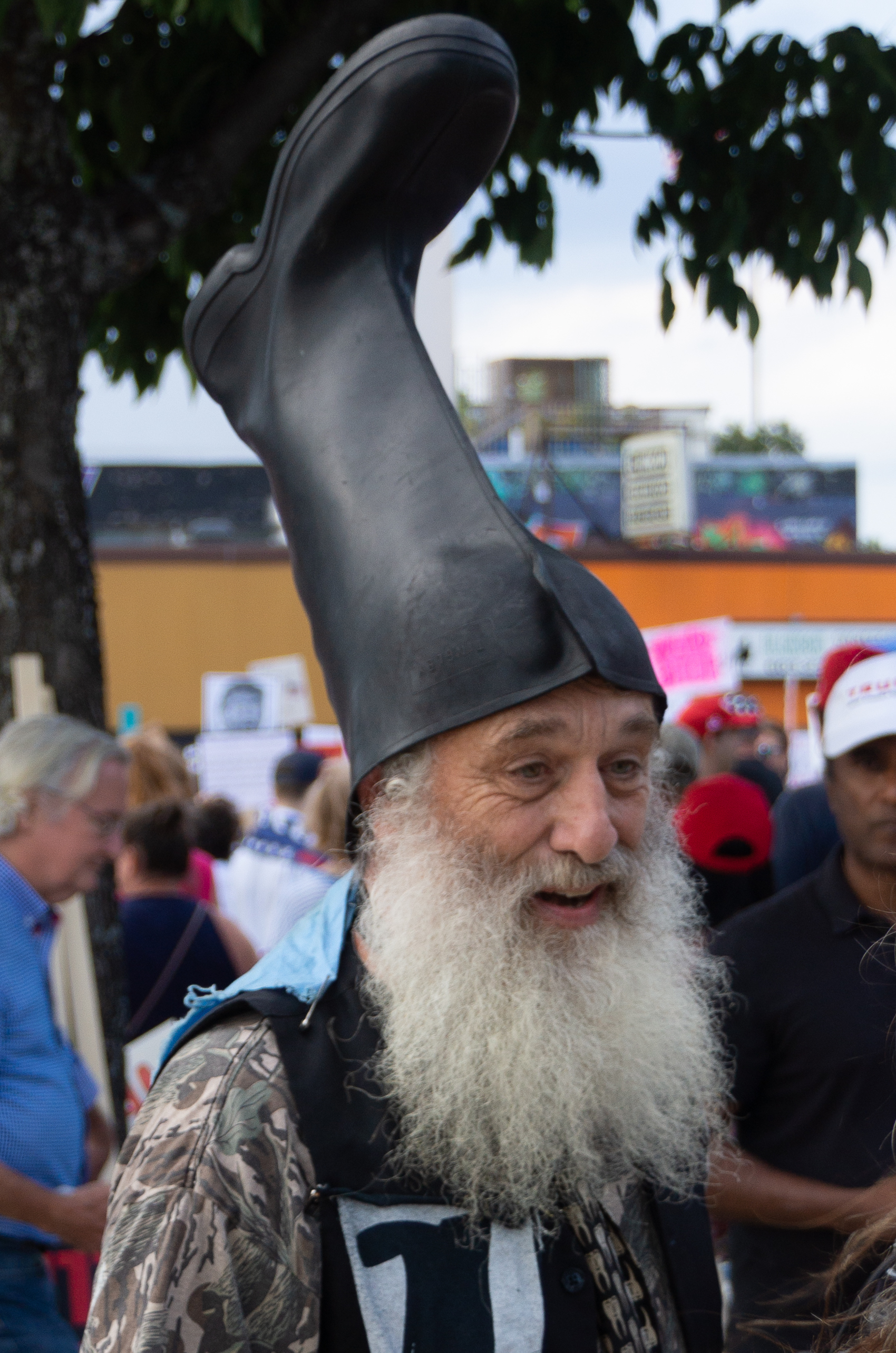
Vermin Supreme, one of the best-known contemporary novelty candidates in the United States.

A novelty candidate (also known as satirical candidate, parody candidate, or joke candidate) is a person who runs (or stands, in the United Kingdom) for political office in an election as a form of satire or protest, without seriously expecting to win. Novelty candidates often (but need not) propose ridiculous policies, which are unreasonably specific and trivial, or overwhelmingly unpopular, or have other characteristics that make them ridiculous.

Some novelty candidates are also perennial candidates, but whereas perennial candidates sometimes run on substantive policy issues, novelty candidacies are typically run for satirical purposes.

== Examples ==
=== In the United Kingdom ===
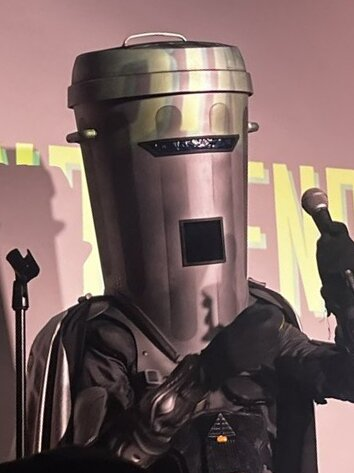
Count Binface, one of the best-known novelty candidates in the United Kingdom.

Novelty candidates and parties are a staple of British general elections, as standing for election to Parliament of the United Kingdom typically only requires a £500 deposit and 10 signatures from registered voters. Candidates may either be affiliated with a novelty party, stand as independents, or create their own political party.

Perhaps inspired by Monty Python's 1970 television comedy sketch, "Election Night Special" and a similar parody by The Goodies, Philip Sargent stood in the 1976 Cambridge by-election for a party called "Science Fiction Looney". In the 1979 United Kingdom general election, Auberon Waugh stood against Jeremy Thorpe as the "Dog Lovers’ Party", referencing the Thorpe affair scandal in which a dog had been shot. The most prominent and longest-lived British novelty party is the Official Monster Raving Loony Party, founded in 1982. Notably, a handful of their policy proposals (such as pubs being allowed to stay open throughout the day, the abolition of dog licences and the phasing out of the Eleven-plus exam) have actually been implemented.

Other examples are Lord Buckethead, "independent space warrior" Count Binface, Mr. Fishfinger, the Elmo-costumed Bobby Smith, an AI chatbot, and a pub owner who listed his pub as a political party and himself as a candidate for advertising purposes.

=== In Iceland ===
In 2024, the Icelandic glacier Snæfellsjökull was running in the Icelandic presidential election. Icelandic law requires presidential candidates to be at least 35 years old, hold Icelandic citizenship, and have no criminal record. To meet these criteria and secure the glacier's place on the nomination list, campaign founder Dr. Angela Rawlings legally changed her middle name to "Snæfellsjökull". The unconventional candidacy drew international media attention, sparking debates on the political representation of nonhuman entities.

=== In the United States ===
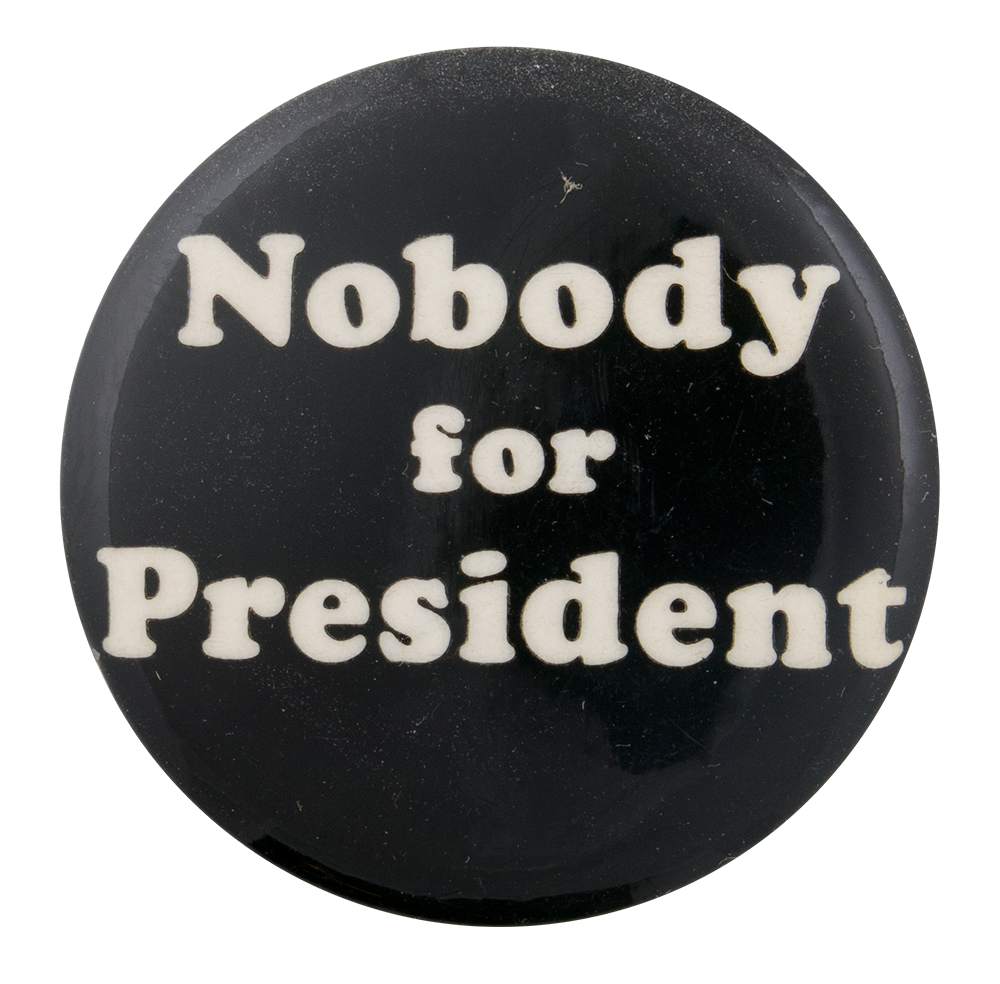
A 1976 Nobody for President campaign button.

Vermin Supreme is an American politician and performance artist who has run as a novelty candidate in various local, state, and national elections in the United States as a Republican, a Democrat, and a Libertarian. He is known for wearing a rubber boot on his head and his campaign promises have included enforcing mandatory tooth-brushing, funding time travel research, raising awareness for a zombie apocalypse, and using time travel to kill baby Hitler.

Pigasus, a 145-pound male hog, was the candidate nominated by the Youth International Party for the 1968 United States presidential election. The action resulted in arrests and was part of the overarching 1968 Democratic National Convention protests. The hog's later fate remains unknown.

Nobody was the candidate nominated by the Youth International Party for the 1976 United States presidential election, as well as the subsequent 1980, 1984, and 1988 presidential elections.

Hank the Cat was a Maine Coon nominated for the 2012 United States Senate election in Virginia, running as a write-in candidate. The campaign drew over 7000 votes, with Hank the Cat coming in third in the election.

Deez Nuts was a presidential candidate during the 2016 United States presidential election, running as an independent alongside other popular write-in candidates such as Captain Crunch and Harambe. Deez Nuts was the highest-polling novelty candidate during that year which was actually represented by a real human being, since Vermin Supreme had lost the Libertarian nomination at the 2016 Libertarian National Convention. Polls indicated that he occasionally ranked higher than the legitimate Green Party candidate Jill Stein, despite having no active publicity campaign.

Ficus was a potted plant who stumped for New Jersey's 11th Congressional District as a write-in candidate in 2000. Filmmaker Michael Moore served as chief campaign strategist for Ficus and promoted the woody shrub's candidacy in his documentary series The Awful Truth.

=== In New Zealand ===
In New Zealand, a joke party, the McGillicuddy Serious Party, ran candidates at elections between 1984 and 1999, with policies based around The Great Leap Backwards, that is, returning NZ to a medieval, subsistence, tribal economy. Their best result came in 1993, when they gained 0.61% of the vote nationwide.

=== Winning novelty candidates ===
On very rare occasions, novelty candidates may actually win the elections they run in. A famous example occurred in Hartlepool in 2002, when Stuart Drummond, standing as the local football club mascot H'Angus the Monkey, won the Hartlepool mayoral race and was subsequently re-elected.

Danish-Faroese comedian Jacob Haugaard unexpectedly won a seat in the 1994 general election. Running as an independent (though representing the joke party Union of Conscientiously Work-Shy Elements), he attracted 23,253 votes, enough to win a seat in the Parliament of Denmark from 1994–98. After his term expired, he decided not to seek re-election. Among his pointedly absurd campaign promises were: 8 hours of free time, 8 hours of rest and 8 hours of sleep; more tailwind on bicycle paths; promises of better weather; right to impotency; Nutella in field rations (which was actually implemented); and shorter queues in supermarkets. Asylum rated his win in the parliamentary election the 11th greatest prank of all time.

== See also ==
- List of novelty candidates
- List of frivolous political parties
- Non-human electoral candidates
  - List of animals in political office
- Nuisance candidate, Philippine political term for a candidate deemed unfit to run for public office
- Virtual politician
