= Aarhus South (nomination district) =

- Aarhus Syd
- Nomination district constituency for the Folketing
- Location of Aarhus South within East Jutland

- Location of East Jutland within Denmark
- Municipalities: Aarhus
- Constituency: East Jutland
- Electorate: 58,440 (2022)

Current constituency
- Created: 1895 (as constituency); 1920 (as nomination district)

Aarhus South nominating district is one of the 92 nominating districts that exists for Danish elections following the 2007 municipal reform. It is one of the four nomination districts in Aarhus Municipality, the others being Aarhus West, Aarhus North and Aarhus East. It was established as a constituency in 1895 as Aarhus County 3, became Aarhus County 4 in 1915, and became a nomination district in 1920. It obtained its current boundaries and name in 1970.

In general elections, the district is a strong area for parties commonly associated with the red bloc, and the Social Democrats has always won the most votes.

== General elections results ==
=== General elections in the 2020s ===
2022 Danish general election

Parties	Vote		
Parties	Votes	%	+ / -
Social Democrats	12,296	24.08	+0.71
Venstre	6,721	13.16	-8.32
Green Left	5,799	11.36	+1.32
Liberal Alliance	5,014	9.82	+6.91
Moderates	4,875	9.55	New
Red–Green Alliance	3,723	7.29	-1.33
Social Liberals	3,181	6.23	-6.04
The Alternative	2,652	5.19	+0.96
Conservatives	2,573	5.04	-1.42
Denmark Democrats	1,903	3.73	New
New Right	1,096	2.15	+0.31
Danish People's Party	735	1.44	-3.65
Independent Greens	261	0.51	New
Christian Democrats	192	0.38	-1.43
Jesper Antonsen	29	0.06	New
Chresten H. Ibsen	8	0.02	-0.07
Total	51,058		

=== General elections in the 2010s ===
2019 Danish general election

Parties	Vote		
Parties	Votes	%	+ / -
Social Democrats	11,975	23.37	-3.85
Venstre	11,010	21.48	+3.68
Social Liberals	6,290	12.27	+5.53
Green Left	5,147	10.04	+5.03
Red–Green Alliance	4,417	8.62	+0.54
Conservatives	3,310	6.46	+3.15
Danish People's Party	2,609	5.09	-7.86
The Alternative	2,168	4.23	-3.89
Liberal Alliance	1,492	2.91	-6.89
New Right	945	1.84	New
Christian Democrats	928	1.81	+1.11
Stram Kurs	558	1.09	New
Klaus Riskær Pedersen Party	343	0.67	New
Chresten H. Ibsen	47	0.09	New
Hans Schultz	8	0.02	New
Total	51,247		

2015 Danish general election

Parties	Vote		
Parties	Votes	%	+ / -
Social Democrats	13,623	27.22	+1.12
Venstre	8,909	17.80	-7.99
Danish People's Party	6,483	12.95	+5.21
Liberal Alliance	4,902	9.80	+4.56
The Alternative	4,064	8.12	New
Red–Green Alliance	4,044	8.08	+0.65
Social Liberals	3,375	6.74	-6.41
Green Left	2,509	5.01	-4.50
Conservatives	1,655	3.31	-1.25
Christian Democrats	349	0.70	+0.25
Yahya Hassan	106	0.21	New
Peter Ymer Nielsen	21	0.04	New
Poul Gundersen	5	0.01	New
Total	50,045		

2011 Danish general election

Parties	Vote		
Parties	Votes	%	+ / -
Social Democrats	12,908	26.10	-0.80
Venstre	12,752	25.79	+1.90
Social Liberals	6,501	13.15	+5.98
Green Left	4,705	9.51	-6.27
Danish People's Party	3,825	7.74	-1.59
Red–Green Alliance	3,673	7.43	+4.87
Liberal Alliance	2,592	5.24	+1.87
Conservatives	2,253	4.56	-5.72
Christian Democrats	224	0.45	-0.24
Janus Kramer Møller	11	0.02	New
Ibrahim Gøkhan	6	0.01	New
Total	49,450		

=== General elections in the 2000s ===
2007 Danish general election

Parties	Vote		
Parties	Votes	%	+ / -
Social Democrats	12,577	26.90	-1.22
Venstre	11,171	23.89	-1.95
Green Left	7,376	15.78	+8.86
Conservatives	4,806	10.28	-1.18
Danish People's Party	4,364	9.33	+0.43
Social Liberals	3,352	7.17	-4.50
New Alliance	1,574	3.37	New
Red–Green Alliance	1,198	2.56	-1.79
Christian Democrats	321	0.69	-0.73
Jes Krogh	13	0.03	New
Total	46,752		

2005 Danish general election

Parties	Vote		
Parties	Votes	%	+ / -
Social Democrats	12,893	28.12	-3.34
Venstre	11,846	25.84	-3.88
Social Liberals	5,350	11.67	+4.96
Conservatives	5,252	11.46	+2.85
Danish People's Party	4,078	8.90	+0.31
Green Left	3,171	6.92	-0.16
Red–Green Alliance	1,992	4.35	+1.37
Christian Democrats	652	1.42	-0.84
Centre Democrats	469	1.02	-1.15
Minority Party	132	0.29	New
Janus Kramer Møller	7	0.02	New
Total	45,842		

2001 Danish general election

Parties	Vote		
Parties	Votes	%	+ / -
Social Democrats	14,454	31.46	-6.17
Venstre	13,655	29.72	+6.27
Conservatives	3,954	8.61	+0.17
Danish People's Party	3,948	8.59	+3.21
Green Left	3,251	7.08	-1.64
Social Liberals	3,085	6.71	+2.03
Red–Green Alliance	1,367	2.98	-0.48
Christian People's Party	1,037	2.26	+0.19
Centre Democrats	996	2.17	-2.42
Progress Party	180	0.39	-0.79
Lars Bang	17	0.04	New
Total	45,944		

=== General elections in the 1990s ===
1998 Danish general election

Parties	Vote		
Parties	Votes	%	+ / -
Social Democrats	16,929	37.63	+4.47
Venstre	10,549	23.45	+2.27
Green Left	3,921	8.72	+0.65
Conservatives	3,795	8.44	-5.69
Danish People's Party	2,422	5.38	New
Social Liberals	2,104	4.68	-0.32
Centre Democrats	2,064	4.59	+1.84
Red–Green Alliance	1,557	3.46	+0.13
Christian People's Party	930	2.07	+0.42
Progress Party	529	1.18	-3.38
Democratic Renewal	176	0.39	New
John Juhler	11	0.02	New
Total	44,987		

1994 Danish general election

Parties	Vote		
Parties	Votes	%	+ / -
Social Democrats	14,710	33.16	-1.42
Venstre	9,396	21.18	+4.66
Conservatives	6,266	14.13	-0.51
Green Left	3,581	8.07	-3.47
Jacob Haugaard	2,722	6.14	+3.36
Social Liberals	2,216	5.00	+0.91
Progress Party	2,021	4.56	-0.19
Red–Green Alliance	1,478	3.33	+0.99
Centre Democrats	1,221	2.75	-1.87
Christian People's Party	734	1.65	-0.08
Søren Boelskifte	12	0.03	New
Bjarne S. Landsfeldt	1	0.00	New
Total	44,358		

1990 Danish general election

Parties	Vote		
Parties	Votes	%	+ / -
Social Democrats	14,471	34.58	+5.92
Venstre	6,912	16.52	+6.01
Conservatives	6,127	14.64	-5.43
Green Left	4,829	11.54	-5.66
Progress Party	1,988	4.75	-1.35
Centre Democrats	1,934	4.62	+0.49
Social Liberals	1,711	4.09	-2.09
Jacob Haugaard	1,165	2.78	+1.58
Red–Green Alliance	979	2.34	New
Christian People's Party	724	1.73	+0.20
The Greens	395	0.94	-0.44
Common Course	329	0.79	-0.15
Justice Party of Denmark	279	0.67	New
Total	41,843		

=== General elections in the 1980s ===
1988 Danish general election

Parties	Vote		
Parties	Votes	%	+ / -
Social Democrats	11,997	28.66	+1.45
Conservatives	8,402	20.07	-0.35
Green Left	7,197	17.20	-1.63
Venstre	4,398	10.51	+1.88
Social Liberals	2,586	6.18	-1.38
Progress Party	2,554	6.10	+2.75
Centre Democrats	1,730	4.13	-0.16
Christian People's Party	642	1.53	-0.44
The Greens	578	1.38	+0.09
Jacob Haugaard	502	1.20	+0.46
Communist Party of Denmark	463	1.11	0.00
Left Socialists	405	0.97	-1.62
Common Course	394	0.94	-0.27
Finn Mikkelsen	4	0.01	New
Bruno Nielsen-Boreas	3	0.01	New
Total	41,855		

1987 Danish general election

Parties	Vote		
Parties	Votes	%	+ / -
Social Democrats	11,337	27.21	-2.06
Conservatives	8,508	20.42	-3.10
Green Left	7,844	18.83	+3.12
Venstre	3,596	8.63	-1.47
Social Liberals	3,149	7.56	+1.66
Centre Democrats	1,786	4.29	+0.04
Progress Party	1,394	3.35	+1.50
Left Socialists	1,078	2.59	-2.19
Christian People's Party	819	1.97	+0.30
The Greens	536	1.29	New
Common Course	504	1.21	New
Communist Party of Denmark	461	1.11	+0.35
Jacob Haugaard	308	0.74	+0.46
Justice Party of Denmark	255	0.61	-1.21
Humanist Party	50	0.12	New
Socialist Workers Party	20	0.05	0.00
Marxist–Leninists Party	17	0.04	0.00
Henning Brønd-Nielsen	0	0.00	New
Total	41,662		

1984 Danish general election

Parties	Vote		
Parties	Votes	%	+ / -
Social Democrats	11,895	29.27	-2.60
Conservatives	9,556	23.52	+8.15
Green Left	6,383	15.71	+0.04
Venstre	4,103	10.10	+1.20
Social Liberals	2,397	5.90	+0.87
Left Socialists	1,943	4.78	+0.87
Centre Democrats	1,725	4.25	-4.46
Progress Party	752	1.85	-3.85
Justice Party of Denmark	739	1.82	+0.15
Christian People's Party	678	1.67	+0.11
Communist Party of Denmark	310	0.76	-0.49
Jacob Haugaard	115	0.28	+0.07
Socialist Workers Party	21	0.05	0.00
Marxist–Leninists Party	15	0.04	New
Total	40,632		

1981 Danish general election

Parties	Vote		
Parties	Votes	%	+ / -
Social Democrats	12,182	31.87	-7.29
Green Left	5,991	15.67	+6.44
Conservatives	5,873	15.37	+0.72
Venstre	3,402	8.90	-0.97
Centre Democrats	3,329	8.71	+5.82
Progress Party	2,178	5.70	-0.43
Social Liberals	1,923	5.03	-0.34
Left Socialists	1,495	3.91	-0.98
Justice Party of Denmark	639	1.67	-1.54
Christian People's Party	598	1.56	-0.40
Communist Party of Denmark	476	1.25	-0.77
Jacob Haugaard	82	0.21	-0.06
Communist Workers Party	29	0.08	-0.27
Socialist Workers Party	21	0.05	New
Lars Michaelsen	5	0.01	New
Henrik Christensen	0	0.00	New
Total	38,223		

=== General elections in the 1970s ===
1979 Danish general election

Parties	Vote		
Parties	Votes	%	+ / -
Social Democrats	14,899	39.16	-1.11
Conservatives	5,574	14.65	+4.23
Venstre	3,755	9.87	+0.87
Green Left	3,510	9.23	+3.66
Progress Party	2,332	6.13	-3.65
Social Liberals	2,045	5.37	+2.10
Left Socialists	1,861	4.89	+0.74
Justice Party of Denmark	1,221	3.21	-0.54
Centre Democrats	1,101	2.89	-3.38
Communist Party of Denmark	767	2.02	-1.85
Christian People's Party	744	1.96	-0.90
Communist Workers Party	134	0.35	New
Jacob Haugaard	104	0.27	New
Total	38,047		

1977 Danish general election

Parties	Vote		
Parties	Votes	%	+ / -
Social Democrats	14,835	40.27	+7.44
Conservatives	3,840	10.42	+3.92
Progress Party	3,603	9.78	+0.26
Venstre	3,316	9.00	-11.56
Centre Democrats	2,308	6.27	+4.24
Green Left	2,050	5.57	-0.46
Left Socialists	1,528	4.15	+1.12
Communist Party of Denmark	1,424	3.87	-0.41
Justice Party of Denmark	1,381	3.75	+1.33
Social Liberals	1,205	3.27	-3.97
Christian People's Party	1,052	2.86	-2.70
Pensioners' Party	284	0.77	New
Tommy Nielsen	9	0.02	New
Total	36,835		

1975 Danish general election

Parties	Vote		
Parties	Votes	%	+ / -
Social Democrats	12,021	32.83	+0.88
Venstre	7,528	20.56	+10.22
Progress Party	3,486	9.52	+8.12
Social Liberals	2,650	7.24	-5.09
Conservatives	2,379	6.50	-6.15
Green Left	2,209	6.03	-2.38
Christian People's Party	2,035	5.56	+1.37
Communist Party of Denmark	1,567	4.28	-0.20
Left Socialists	1,108	3.03	+0.87
Justice Party of Denmark	885	2.42	-2.26
Centre Democrats	743	2.03	-5.34
Elmer Mariager	5	0.01	New
Total	36,616		

1973 Danish general election

Parties	Vote		
Parties	Votes	%	+ / -
Social Democrats	10,465	31.95	-6.04
Conservatives	4,145	12.65	-6.07
Social Liberals	4,039	12.33	-3.35
Venstre	3,387	10.34	-1.03
Green Left	2,755	8.41	-1.12
Centre Democrats	2,413	7.37	New
Justice Party of Denmark	1,533	4.68	+2.48
Communist Party of Denmark	1,467	4.48	+3.22
Christian People's Party	1,374	4.19	+2.69
Left Socialists	709	2.16	+0.42
Progress Party	457	1.40	New
John Bove	14	0.04	New
Total	32,758		

1971 Danish general election

Parties	Vote		
Parties	Votes	%	+ / -
Social Democrats	13,410	37.99	+4.25
Conservatives	6,608	18.72	-10.78
Social Liberals	5,536	15.68	+0.47
Venstre	4,013	11.37	+2.40
Green Left	3,365	9.53	+3.06
Justice Party of Denmark	777	2.20	+1.54
Left Socialists	614	1.74	-0.17
Christian People's Party	531	1.50	New
Communist Party of Denmark	443	1.26	+0.43
Total	35,297		

=== General elections in the 1960s ===
1968 Danish general election

Parties	Vote		
Parties	Votes	%	+ / -
Social Democrats	18,354	33.74	-3.57
Conservatives	16,048	29.50	+0.60
Social Liberals	8,272	15.21	+8.52
Venstre	4,880	8.97	-0.41
Green Left	3,519	6.47	-4.38
Liberal Centre	1,149	2.11	-1.87
Left Socialists	1,039	1.91	New
Communist Party of Denmark	449	0.83	+0.14
Justice Party of Denmark	361	0.66	+0.04
Independent Party	322	0.59	-0.99
Total	54,393		

1966 Danish general election

Parties	Vote		
Parties	Votes	%	+ / -
Social Democrats	19,794	37.31	-4.73
Conservatives	15,331	28.90	-2.74
Green Left	5,759	10.85	+5.35
Venstre	4,977	9.38	-1.05
Social Liberals	3,548	6.69	+3.47
Liberal Centre	2,112	3.98	New
Independent Party	840	1.58	-1.61
Communist Party of Denmark	364	0.69	-0.40
Justice Party of Denmark	329	0.62	-0.74
Total	53,054		

1964 Danish general election

Parties	Vote		
Parties	Votes	%	+ / -
Social Democrats	20,918	42.04	-2.84
Conservatives	15,743	31.64	+2.37
Venstre	5,187	10.43	+1.38
Green Left	2,735	5.50	-0.36
Social Liberals	1,601	3.22	-0.02
Independent Party	1,585	3.19	-1.23
Justice Party of Denmark	675	1.36	-1.02
Communist Party of Denmark	544	1.09	+0.18
Danish Unity	393	0.79	New
Peace Politics People's Party	373	0.75	New
Total	49,754		

1960 Danish general election

Parties	Vote		
Parties	Votes	%	+ / -
Social Democrats	19,276	44.88	+0.81
Conservatives	12,571	29.27	+3.26
Venstre	3,886	9.05	-2.82
Green Left	2,515	5.86	New
Independent Party	1,899	4.42	-0.04
Social Liberals	1,391	3.24	-1.76
Justice Party of Denmark	1,023	2.38	-3.55
Communist Party of Denmark	390	0.91	-1.75
Total	42,951		

=== General elections in the 1950s ===
1957 Danish general election

Parties	Vote		
Parties	Votes	%	+ / -
Social Democrats	16,526	44.07	-3.01
Conservatives	9,752	26.01	-0.64
Venstre	4,452	11.87	+2.26
Justice Party of Denmark	2,223	5.93	+2.39
Social Liberals	1,875	5.00	+0.82
Independent Party	1,671	4.46	-0.51
Communist Party of Denmark	999	2.66	-1.31
Total	37,498		

September 1953 Danish Folketing election

Parties	Vote		
Parties	Votes	%	+ / -
Social Democrats	16,136	47.08	+2.44
Conservatives	9,135	26.65	-3.13
Venstre	3,295	9.61	+0.18
Independent Party	1,705	4.97	New
Social Liberals	1,433	4.18	-0.85
Communist Party of Denmark	1,360	3.97	-0.46
Justice Party of Denmark	1,212	3.54	-1.54
Total	34,276		

April 1953 Danish Folketing election

Parties	Vote		
Parties	Votes	%	+ / -
Social Democrats	14,398	44.64	-1.12
Conservatives	9,605	29.78	-0.70
Venstre	3,041	9.43	+1.32
Justice Party of Denmark	1,639	5.08	-2.87
Social Liberals	1,621	5.03	+1.26
Communist Party of Denmark	1,428	4.43	+0.50
Danish Unity	525	1.63	New
Total	32,257		

1950 Danish Folketing election

Parties	Vote		
Parties	Votes	%	+ / -
Social Democrats	14,514	45.76	-1.81
Conservatives	9,667	30.48	+4.28
Venstre	2,574	8.11	-1.31
Justice Party of Denmark	2,522	7.95	+2.81
Communist Party of Denmark	1,248	3.93	-3.09
Social Liberals	1,195	3.77	+0.75
Total	31,720		

=== General elections in the 1940s ===
1947 Danish Folketing election

Parties	Vote		
Parties	Votes	%	+ / -
Social Democrats	8,466	47.57	+7.96
Conservatives	4,662	26.20	-7.22
Venstre	1,677	9.42	+4.17
Communist Party of Denmark	1,249	7.02	-7.38
Justice Party of Denmark	915	5.14	+3.85
Social Liberals	538	3.02	+0.94
Danish Unity	290	1.63	-2.33
Total	17,797		

1945 Danish Folketing election

Parties	Vote		
Parties	Votes	%	+ / -
Social Democrats	7,077	39.61	-14.24
Conservatives	5,971	33.42	+2.15
Communist Party of Denmark	2,572	14.40	New
Venstre	938	5.25	-1.70
Danish Unity	708	3.96	+2.51
Social Liberals	371	2.08	-0.51
Justice Party of Denmark	230	1.29	-0.36
Total	17,867		

1943 Danish Folketing election

Parties	Vote		
Parties	Votes	%	+ / -
Social Democrats	16,805	53.85	+3.01
Conservatives	9,757	31.27	+0.80
Venstre	2,169	6.95	+1.02
Social Liberals	808	2.59	-0.42
National Socialist Workers' Party of Denmark	621	1.99	+0.65
Justice Party of Denmark	515	1.65	-0.30
Danish Unity	451	1.45	+1.00
Farmers' Party	79	0.25	-0.57
Total	31,205		

=== General elections in the 1930s ===
1939 Danish Folketing election

Parties	Vote		
Parties	Votes	%	+ / -
Social Democrats	12,458	50.84	-4.32
Conservatives	7,465	30.47	+1.18
Venstre	1,454	5.93	-0.06
Social Liberals	738	3.01	-0.06
Communist Party of Denmark	709	2.89	+1.34
National Cooperation	561	2.29	New
Justice Party of Denmark	479	1.95	-1.15
National Socialist Workers' Party of Denmark	328	1.34	+0.42
Farmers' Party	200	0.82	-0.09
Danish Unity	111	0.45	New
Total	24,503		

1935 Danish Folketing election

Parties	Vote		
Parties	Votes	%	+ / -
Social Democrats	12,542	55.16	-4.30
Conservatives	6,660	29.29	+5.31
Venstre	1,363	5.99	-3.54
Justice Party of Denmark	705	3.10	-0.13
Social Liberals	697	3.07	+0.14
Communist Party of Denmark	353	1.55	+0.67
National Socialist Workers' Party of Denmark	210	0.92	New
Independent People's Party	208	0.91	New
Total	22,738		

1932 Danish Folketing election

Parties	Vote		
Parties	Votes	%	+ / -
Social Democrats	11,258	59.46	-6.22
Conservatives	4,540	23.98	-2.93
Venstre	1,804	9.53	+6.80
Justice Party of Denmark	612	3.23	+1.25
Social Liberals	554	2.93	+0.61
Communist Party of Denmark	167	0.88	+0.50
Total	18,935		

=== General elections in the 1920s ===
1929 Danish Folketing election

Parties	Vote		
Parties	Votes	%	+ / -
Social Democrats	5,807	65.68	+9.67
Conservatives	2,379	26.91	+0.94
Venstre	241	2.73	-8.60
Social Liberals	205	2.32	-0.35
Justice Party of Denmark	175	1.98	-1.36
Total	8,841		

1926 Danish Folketing election

Parties	Vote		
Parties	Votes	%	+ / -
Social Democrats	8,430	56.01	+2.07
Conservatives	3,909	25.97	+0.16
Venstre	1,706	11.33	-0.70
Justice Party of Denmark	502	3.34	-0.10
Social Liberals	402	2.67	-0.97
Communist Party of Denmark	102	0.68	-0.36
Total	15,051		

1924 Danish Folketing election

Parties	Vote		
Parties	Votes	%	+ / -
Social Democrats	7,666	53.94	+1.91
Conservatives	3,668	25.81	+2.18
Venstre	1,710	12.03	-4.54
Social Liberals	518	3.64	-0.93
Justice Party of Denmark	489	3.44	New
Communist Party of Denmark	148	1.04	New
Farmer Party	14	0.10	New
Total	14,213		

September 1920 Danish Folketing election

Parties	Vote		
Parties	Votes	%	+ / -
Social Democrats	6,420	52.03	+2.56
Conservatives	2,915	23.63	-1.15
Venstre	2,045	16.57	-1.63
Social Liberals	564	4.57	-0.29
Industry Party	325	2.63	+0.38
Danish Left Socialist Party	69	0.56	New
Total	12,338		

July 1920 Danish Folketing election

Parties	Vote		
Parties	Votes	%	+ / -
Social Democrats	5,078	49.47	+1.30
Conservatives	2,544	24.78	-1.17
Venstre	1,868	18.20	+1.46
Social Liberals	499	4.86	-1.14
Industry Party	231	2.25	-0.89
C. V. Christensen	45	0.44	New
Total	10,265		

April 1920 Danish Folketing election

Parties	Vote	
Parties	Votes	%
Social Democrats	5,303	48.17
Conservatives	2,857	25.95
Venstre	1,843	16.74
Social Liberals	661	6.6
Industry Party	346	3.14
Total	11,010	

== European Parliament elections results ==
2024 European Parliament election in Denmark

Parties	Vote		
Parties	Votes	%	+ / -
Green Left	9,138	23.31	+5.48
Social Democrats	5,432	13.86	-6.47
Venstre	4,678	11.93	-8.54
Social Liberals	3,914	9.98	-2.86
Conservatives	3,552	9.06	+3.01
Red–Green Alliance	3,207	8.18	+2.19
Liberal Alliance	2,638	6.73	+4.22
Moderates	2,555	6.52	New
The Alternative	1,446	3.69	-1.10
Danish People's Party	1,363	3.48	-2.73
Denmark Democrats	1,278	3.26	New
Total	39,201		

2019 European Parliament election in Denmark

Parties	Vote		
Parties	Votes	%	+ / -
Venstre	8,821	20.47	+4.25
Social Democrats	8,763	20.33	-0.09
Green Left	7,683	17.83	+2.45
Social Liberals	5,533	12.84	+3.61
Danish People's Party	2,678	6.21	-12.79
Conservatives	2,608	6.05	-1.56
Red–Green Alliance	2,581	5.99	New
The Alternative	2,066	4.79	New
People's Movement against the EU	1,286	2.98	-5.60
Liberal Alliance	1,080	2.51	-1.06
Total	43,099		

2014 European Parliament election in Denmark

Parties	Vote		
Parties	Votes	%	+ / -
Social Democrats	6,975	20.42	-4.45
Danish People's Party	6,491	19.00	+7.35
Venstre	5,540	16.22	-2.30
Green Left	5,253	15.38	-3.83
Social Liberals	3,152	9.23	+3.99
People's Movement against the EU	2,929	8.58	+1.78
Conservatives	2,598	7.61	-2.82
Liberal Alliance	1,219	3.57	+2.75
Total	34,157		

2009 European Parliament election in Denmark

Parties	Vote		
Parties	Votes	%	+ / -
Social Democrats	8,650	24.87	-6.96
Green Left	6,681	19.21	+8.15
Venstre	6,443	18.52	+2.29
Danish People's Party	4,053	11.65	+6.17
Conservatives	3,629	10.43	-0.86
People's Movement against the EU	2,365	6.80	+1.95
Social Liberals	1,824	5.24	-3.23
June Movement	855	2.46	-7.38
Liberal Alliance	285	0.82	New
Total	34,785		

2004 European Parliament election in Denmark

Parties	Vote		
Parties	Votes	%	+ / -
Social Democrats	8,577	31.83	+16.81
Venstre	4,375	16.23	-5.37
Conservatives	3,043	11.29	+3.28
Green Left	2,980	11.06	+2.00
June Movement	2,653	9.84	-7.78
Social Liberals	2,282	8.47	-2.56
Danish People's Party	1,476	5.48	+0.39
People's Movement against the EU	1,306	4.85	-2.20
Christian Democrats	257	0.95	-0.61
Total	26,949		

1999 European Parliament election in Denmark

Parties	Vote		
Parties	Votes	%	+ / -
Venstre	6,011	21.60	+5.81
June Movement	4,904	17.62	-0.62
Social Democrats	4,180	15.02	+1.62
Social Liberals	3,070	11.03	+2.27
Green Left	2,522	9.06	-1.98
Conservatives	2,228	8.01	-10.40
People's Movement against the EU	1,962	7.05	-3.41
Danish People's Party	1,416	5.09	New
Centre Democrats	1,104	3.97	+3.09
Christian Democrats	435	1.56	+0.90
Progress Party	115	0.41	-1.94
Total	27,832		

1994 European Parliament election in Denmark

Parties	Vote		
Parties	Votes	%	+ / -
Conservatives	5,418	18.41	+3.83
June Movement	5,368	18.24	New
Venstre	4,647	15.79	+4.01
Social Democrats	3,943	13.40	-6.97
Green Left	3,250	11.04	-1.31
People's Movement against the EU	3,077	10.46	-13.62
Social Liberals	2,579	8.76	+5.34
Progress Party	692	2.35	-2.00
Centre Democrats	259	0.88	-6.20
Christian Democrats	195	0.66	-1.32
Total	29,428		

1989 European Parliament election in Denmark

Parties	Vote		
Parties	Votes	%	+ / -
People's Movement against the EU	5,712	24.08	-1.02
Social Democrats	4,832	20.37	+2.79
Conservatives	3,458	14.58	-8.04
Green Left	2,928	12.35	+0.27
Venstre	2,794	11.78	+4.54
Centre Democrats	1,679	7.08	+0.69
Progress Party	1,032	4.35	+1.87
Social Liberals	812	3.42	+0.54
Christian Democrats	470	1.98	+0.41
Total	23,717		

1984 European Parliament election in Denmark

Parties	Vote	
Parties	Votes	%
People's Movement against the EU	6,598	25.10
Conservatives	5,944	22.62
Social Democrats	4,621	17.58
Green Left	3,176	12.08
Venstre	1,904	7.24
Centre Democrats	1,679	6.39
Social Liberals	757	2.88
Progress Party	651	2.48
Left Socialists	539	2.05
Christian Democrats	413	1.57
Total	26,282	

== Referendums ==
2022 Danish European Union opt-out referendum

Option	Votes	%
✓ YES	30,136	74.55
X NO	10,286	25.45

2015 Danish European Union opt-out referendum

Option	Votes	%
✓ YES	22,925	54.72
X NO	18,969	45.28

2014 Danish Unified Patent Court membership referendum

Option	Votes	%
✓ YES	21,451	64.97
X NO	11,567	35.03

2009 Danish Act of Succession referendum

Option	Votes	%
✓ YES	27,292	87.36
X NO	3,948	12.64

2000 Danish euro referendum

Option	Votes	%
✓ YES	23,937	52.80
X NO	21,402	47.20

1998 Danish Amsterdam Treaty referendum

Option	Votes	%
✓ YES	23,466	58.83
X NO	16,423	41.17

1993 Danish Maastricht Treaty referendum

Option	Votes	%
✓ YES	25,523	57.95
X NO	18,520	42.05

1992 Danish Maastricht Treaty referendum

Option	Votes	%
X NO	21,520	50.69
✓ YES	20,932	49.31

1986 Danish Single European Act referendum

Option	Votes	%
✓ YES	18,518	51.47
X NO	17,457	48.53

1972 Danish European Communities membership referendum

Option	Votes	%
✓ YES	22,548	60.19
X NO	14,916	39.81

1953 Danish constitutional and electoral age referendum

Option	Votes	%
✓ YES	17,551	78.00
X NO	4,950	22.00
21 years	11,625	50.03
23 years	11,610	49.97

1939 Danish constitutional referendum

Option	Votes	%
✓ YES	17,509	94.39
X NO	1,040	5.61
