= Skanderborg (nomination district) =

- Skanderborg
- Nomination district constituency for the Folketing
- Location of Skanderborg within East Jutland

- Location of East Jutland within Denmark
- Municipalities: Odder; Samsø; Skanderborg
- Constituency: East Jutland
- Electorate: 66,242 (2022)

Current constituency
- Created: 1849 (as constituency); 1920 (as nomination district)

Skanderborg nominating district is one of the 92 nominating districts that exists for Danish elections following the 2007 municipal reform. It consists of Odder, Samsø and Skanderborg municipality. It was created in 1849 as a constituency, and has been a nomination district since 1920, though its boundaries have been changed since then.

In general elections, the district has tended to vote close to the national result, when looking at the voter split between the two blocs.

== General elections results ==
=== General elections in the 2020s ===
2022 Danish general election

Parties	Vote		
Parties	Votes	%	+ / -
Social Democrats	15,925	27.40	+1.25
Venstre	8,138	14.00	-11.23
Green Left	5,548	9.55	+1.35
Moderates	5,450	9.38	New
Liberal Alliance	5,225	8.99	+6.69
Denmark Democrats	4,218	7.26	New
Conservatives	3,156	5.43	-1.42
Red–Green Alliance	2,522	4.34	-1.41
Social Liberals	2,343	4.03	-4.62
The Alternative	2,098	3.61	+0.39
New Right	2,072	3.56	+1.63
Danish People's Party	1,000	1.72	-6.16
Christian Democrats	226	0.39	-1.41
Independent Greens	139	0.24	New
Jesper Antonsen	53	0.09	New
Chresten H. Ibsen	8	0.01	-0.09
Total	58,121		

=== General elections in the 2010s ===
2019 Danish general election

Parties	Vote		
Parties	Votes	%	+ / -
Social Democrats	14,720	26.15	-1.91
Venstre	14,200	25.23	+3.78
Social Liberals	4,867	8.65	+4.17
Green Left	4,613	8.20	+4.14
Danish People's Party	4,436	7.88	-10.66
Conservatives	3,854	6.85	+3.79
Red–Green Alliance	3,234	5.75	-0.01
The Alternative	1,812	3.22	-2.82
Liberal Alliance	1,292	2.30	-5.52
New Right	1,084	1.93	New
Christian Democrats	1,013	1.80	+1.20
Stram Kurs	688	1.22	New
Klaus Riskær Pedersen Party	415	0.74	New
Chresten H. Ibsen	56	0.10	New
Hans Schultz	5	0.01	New
Total	56,289		

2015 Danish general election

Parties	Vote		
Parties	Votes	%	+ / -
Social Democrats	15,251	28.06	+2.21
Venstre	11,658	21.45	-9.45
Danish People's Party	10,077	18.54	+8.51
Liberal Alliance	4,249	7.82	+3.16
The Alternative	3,284	6.04	New
Red–Green Alliance	3,133	5.76	+0.53
Social Liberals	2,437	4.48	-5.33
Green Left	2,207	4.06	-5.00
Conservatives	1,663	3.06	-1.01
Christian Democrats	328	0.60	+0.21
Yahya Hassan	49	0.09	New
Peter Ymer Nielsen	15	0.03	New
Poul Gundersen	5	0.01	New
Total	54,356		

2011 Danish general election

Parties	Vote		
Parties	Votes	%	+ / -
Venstre	16,703	30.90	+0.36
Social Democrats	13,975	25.85	-0.61
Danish People's Party	5,421	10.03	-1.35
Social Liberals	5,301	9.81	+4.73
Green Left	4,896	9.06	-2.96
Red–Green Alliance	2,825	5.23	+3.65
Liberal Alliance	2,519	4.66	+1.51
Conservatives	2,200	4.07	-5.17
Christian Democrats	209	0.39	-0.14
Ibrahim Gøkhan	4	0.01	New
Janus Kramer Møller	3	0.01	New
Total	54,056		

=== General elections in the 2000s ===
2007 Danish general election

Parties	Vote		
Parties	Votes	%	+ / -
Venstre	15,964	30.54	-2.56
Social Democrats	13,828	26.46	-1.41
Green Left	6,281	12.02	+6.97
Danish People's Party	5,948	11.38	+0.78
Conservatives	4,828	9.24	-0.80
Social Liberals	2,657	5.08	-2.76
New Alliance	1,646	3.15	New
Red–Green Alliance	826	1.58	-1.37
Christian Democrats	275	0.53	-0.76
Jes Krogh	11	0.02	New
Total	52,264		

2005 Danish general election

Parties	Vote		
Parties	Votes	%	+ / -
Venstre	11,738	33.10	-2.85
Social Democrats	9,884	27.87	-2.22
Danish People's Party	3,760	10.60	+0.98
Conservatives	3,559	10.04	+1.85
Social Liberals	2,780	7.84	+3.56
Green Left	1,792	5.05	-0.61
Red–Green Alliance	1,047	2.95	+0.95
Christian Democrats	458	1.29	-0.65
Centre Democrats	345	0.97	-0.71
Minority Party	93	0.26	New
Janus Kramer Møller	9	0.03	New
Total	35,465		

2001 Danish general election

Parties	Vote		
Parties	Votes	%	+ / -
Venstre	12,683	35.95	+6.46
Social Democrats	10,618	30.09	-6.99
Danish People's Party	3,396	9.62	+3.86
Conservatives	2,890	8.19	+1.29
Green Left	1,998	5.66	-0.86
Social Liberals	1,511	4.28	+0.72
Red–Green Alliance	706	2.00	-0.44
Christian People's Party	683	1.94	+0.23
Centre Democrats	593	1.68	-2.97
Progress Party	188	0.53	-0.91
Lars Bang	18	0.05	New
Total	35,284		

=== General elections in the 1990s ===
1998 Danish general election

Parties	Vote		
Parties	Votes	%	+ / -
Social Democrats	12,696	37.08	+4.17
Venstre	10,097	29.49	+2.73
Conservatives	2,361	6.90	-6.01
Green Left	2,233	6.52	+1.10
Danish People's Party	1,971	5.76	New
Centre Democrats	1,591	4.65	+1.94
Social Liberals	1,220	3.56	-0.79
Red–Green Alliance	836	2.44	+0.07
Christian People's Party	585	1.71	+0.55
Progress Party	493	1.44	-3.48
Democratic Renewal	143	0.42	New
John Juhler	14	0.04	New
Total	34,240		

1994 Danish general election

Parties	Vote		
Parties	Votes	%	+ / -
Social Democrats	10,881	32.91	-2.21
Venstre	8,847	26.76	+6.48
Conservatives	4,268	12.91	-2.30
Jacob Haugaard	2,137	6.46	+4.49
Green Left	1,792	5.42	-1.97
Progress Party	1,625	4.92	-1.72
Social Liberals	1,439	4.35	+0.84
Centre Democrats	896	2.71	-2.19
Red–Green Alliance	784	2.37	+1.20
Christian People's Party	384	1.16	-0.09
Søren Boelskifte	6	0.02	New
Bjarne S. Landsfeldt	3	0.01	New
Total	33,062		

1990 Danish general election

Parties	Vote		
Parties	Votes	%	+ / -
Social Democrats	11,047	35.12	+5.04
Venstre	6,380	20.28	+3.50
Conservatives	4,784	15.21	-4.06
Green Left	2,324	7.39	-3.41
Progress Party	2,088	6.64	-1.38
Centre Democrats	1,540	4.90	+0.59
Social Liberals	1,104	3.51	-2.06
Jacob Haugaard	619	1.97	+1.22
Christian People's Party	394	1.25	+0.14
Red–Green Alliance	367	1.17	New
The Greens	294	0.93	-0.12
Common Course	287	0.91	-0.30
Justice Party of Denmark	229	0.73	New
Total	31,457		

=== General elections in the 1980s ===
1988 Danish general election

Parties	Vote		
Parties	Votes	%	+ / -
Social Democrats	9,582	30.08	+0.50
Conservatives	6,137	19.27	-1.13
Venstre	5,346	16.78	+1.52
Green Left	3,439	10.80	-1.35
Progress Party	2,556	8.02	+3.96
Social Liberals	1,775	5.57	-1.25
Centre Democrats	1,372	4.31	-0.04
Common Course	385	1.21	-0.47
Christian People's Party	353	1.11	-0.35
The Greens	334	1.05	-0.11
Jacob Haugaard	240	0.75	+0.25
Communist Party of Denmark	213	0.67	-0.11
Left Socialists	115	0.36	-0.55
Finn Mikkelsen	4	0.01	New
Bruno Nielsen-Boreas	0	0.00	New
Total	31,851		

1987 Danish general election

Parties	Vote		
Parties	Votes	%	+ / -
Social Democrats	9,471	29.58	+0.70
Conservatives	6,533	20.40	-3.56
Venstre	4,885	15.26	-1.18
Green Left	3,890	12.15	+1.63
Social Liberals	2,183	6.82	+0.37
Centre Democrats	1,392	4.35	-0.44
Progress Party	1,300	4.06	+1.06
Common Course	537	1.68	New
Christian People's Party	468	1.46	-0.04
The Greens	371	1.16	New
Left Socialists	291	0.91	-0.92
Communist Party of Denmark	251	0.78	+0.35
Justice Party of Denmark	223	0.70	-1.26
Jacob Haugaard	159	0.50	+0.40
Humanist Party	40	0.12	New
Socialist Workers Party	21	0.07	-0.05
Marxist–Leninists Party	3	0.01	-0.01
Henning Brønd-Nielsen	3	0.01	New
Total	32,021		

1984 Danish general election

Parties	Vote		
Parties	Votes	%	+ / -
Social Democrats	9,040	28.88	-2.30
Conservatives	7,502	23.96	+10.76
Venstre	5,147	16.44	+0.27
Green Left	3,293	10.52	+0.44
Social Liberals	2,018	6.45	+0.60
Centre Democrats	1,499	4.79	-4.38
Progress Party	938	3.00	-5.74
Justice Party of Denmark	615	1.96	+0.06
Left Socialists	573	1.83	+0.31
Christian People's Party	469	1.50	+0.30
Communist Party of Denmark	134	0.43	-0.29
Socialist Workers Party	39	0.12	+0.06
Jacob Haugaard	30	0.10	-0.04
Marxist–Leninists Party	7	0.02	New
Total	31,304		

1981 Danish general election

Parties	Vote		
Parties	Votes	%	+ / -
Social Democrats	9,178	31.18	-5.88
Venstre	4,760	16.17	-1.04
Conservatives	3,887	13.20	+0.79
Green Left	2,966	10.08	+5.11
Centre Democrats	2,700	9.17	+5.96
Progress Party	2,574	8.74	-0.98
Social Liberals	1,721	5.85	-0.46
Justice Party of Denmark	558	1.90	-1.22
Left Socialists	448	1.52	-1.19
Christian People's Party	353	1.20	-0.28
Communist Party of Denmark	211	0.72	-0.64
Jacob Haugaard	41	0.14	0.00
Communist Workers Party	21	0.07	-0.22
Socialist Workers Party	17	0.06	New
Henrik Christensen	1	0.00	New
Lars Michaelsen	1	0.00	New
Total	29,437		

=== General elections in the 1970s ===
1979 Danish general election

Parties	Vote		
Parties	Votes	%	+ / -
Social Democrats	10,862	37.06	+2.12
Venstre	5,043	17.21	+0.63
Conservatives	3,636	12.41	+4.56
Progress Party	2,849	9.72	-4.68
Social Liberals	1,849	6.31	+1.42
Green Left	1,457	4.97	+1.80
Centre Democrats	942	3.21	-2.80
Justice Party of Denmark	915	3.12	-1.14
Left Socialists	794	2.71	+0.61
Christian People's Party	435	1.48	-1.20
Communist Party of Denmark	398	1.36	-1.10
Communist Workers Party	84	0.29	New
Jacob Haugaard	42	0.14	New
Total	29,306		

1977 Danish general election

Parties	Vote		
Parties	Votes	%	+ / -
Social Democrats	9,710	34.94	+6.03
Venstre	4,608	16.58	-11.23
Progress Party	4,001	14.40	+1.46
Conservatives	2,183	7.85	+3.22
Centre Democrats	1,670	6.01	+4.07
Social Liberals	1,359	4.89	-4.16
Justice Party of Denmark	1,185	4.26	+1.50
Green Left	881	3.17	-0.21
Christian People's Party	746	2.68	-2.07
Communist Party of Denmark	685	2.46	+0.22
Left Socialists	585	2.10	+0.54
Pensioners' Party	169	0.61	New
Tommy Nielsen	10	0.04	New
Total	27,792		

1975 Danish general election

Parties	Vote		
Parties	Votes	%	+ / -
Social Democrats	7,693	28.91	+4.23
Venstre	7,400	27.81	+11.22
Progress Party	3,444	12.94	-3.56
Social Liberals	2,409	9.05	-5.17
Christian People's Party	1,265	4.75	+2.07
Conservatives	1,233	4.63	-3.56
Green Left	899	3.38	-0.20
Justice Party of Denmark	734	2.76	-1.50
Communist Party of Denmark	596	2.24	+0.50
Centre Democrats	517	1.94	-4.43
Left Socialists	416	1.56	+0.38
Elmer Mariager	6	0.02	New
Total	26,612		

1973 Danish general election

Parties	Vote		
Parties	Votes	%	+ / -
Social Democrats	6,419	24.68	-11.22
Venstre	4,314	16.59	-5.17
Progress Party	4,291	16.50	New
Social Liberals	3,698	14.22	-3.73
Conservatives	2,130	8.19	-5.46
Centre Democrats	1,657	6.37	New
Justice Party of Denmark	1,107	4.26	+1.11
Green Left	930	3.58	-1.68
Christian People's Party	696	2.68	+1.82
Communist Party of Denmark	452	1.74	+1.08
Left Socialists	308	1.18	+0.36
John Bove	7	0.03	New
Total	26,009		

1971 Danish general election

Parties	Vote		
Parties	Votes	%	+ / -
Social Democrats	8,621	35.90	+5.05
Venstre	5,225	21.76	-6.44
Social Liberals	4,310	17.95	+1.85
Conservatives	3,277	13.65	-2.74
Green Left	1,262	5.26	+1.75
Justice Party of Denmark	757	3.15	+1.77
Christian People's Party	207	0.86	New
Left Socialists	197	0.82	-0.08
Communist Party of Denmark	159	0.66	+0.36
Total	24,015		

=== General elections in the 1960s ===
1968 Danish general election

Parties	Vote		
Parties	Votes	%	+ / -
Social Democrats	5,830	30.85	-4.59
Venstre	5,330	28.20	-0.93
Conservatives	3,098	16.39	+1.11
Social Liberals	3,042	16.10	+7.87
Green Left	663	3.51	-1.77
Justice Party of Denmark	260	1.38	+0.10
Independent Party	226	1.20	-1.88
Liberal Centre	222	1.17	-0.85
Left Socialists	171	0.90	New
Communist Party of Denmark	57	0.30	+0.03
Total	18,899		

1966 Danish general election

Parties	Vote		
Parties	Votes	%	+ / -
Social Democrats	6,362	35.44	-2.01
Venstre	5,229	29.13	-1.52
Conservatives	2,743	15.28	+0.23
Social Liberals	1,477	8.23	+2.36
Green Left	948	5.28	+2.61
Independent Party	553	3.08	-1.41
Liberal Centre	363	2.02	New
Justice Party of Denmark	229	1.28	-1.37
Communist Party of Denmark	49	0.27	-0.06
Total	17,953		

1964 Danish general election

Parties	Vote		
Parties	Votes	%	+ / -
Social Democrats	6,135	37.45	+0.86
Venstre	5,020	30.65	-2.93
Conservatives	2,466	15.05	+4.80
Social Liberals	962	5.87	-0.76
Independent Party	735	4.49	-1.62
Green Left	437	2.67	+0.08
Justice Party of Denmark	434	2.65	-1.20
Peace Politics People's Party	84	0.51	New
Communist Party of Denmark	54	0.33	-0.08
Danish Unity	54	0.33	New
Total	16,381		

1960 Danish general election

Parties	Vote		
Parties	Votes	%	+ / -
Social Democrats	5,422	36.59	+3.98
Venstre	4,977	33.58	-4.78
Conservatives	1,519	10.25	+1.87
Social Liberals	982	6.63	-1.02
Independent Party	905	6.11	+0.68
Justice Party of Denmark	570	3.85	-2.79
Green Left	384	2.59	New
Communist Party of Denmark	61	0.41	-0.52
Total	14,820		

=== General elections in the 1950s ===
1957 Danish general election

Parties	Vote		
Parties	Votes	%	+ / -
Venstre	5,560	38.36	+2.20
Social Democrats	4,727	32.61	-3.11
Conservatives	1,214	8.38	+0.73
Social Liberals	1,109	7.65	+0.81
Justice Party of Denmark	963	6.64	+0.48
Independent Party	787	5.43	-0.77
Communist Party of Denmark	135	0.93	-0.33
Total	14,495		

September 1953 Danish Folketing election

Parties	Vote		
Parties	Votes	%	+ / -
Venstre	5,058	36.16	-1.59
Social Democrats	4,996	35.72	+1.06
Conservatives	1,070	7.65	-1.89
Social Liberals	957	6.84	-0.57
Independent Party	867	6.20	New
Justice Party of Denmark	862	6.16	-2.43
Communist Party of Denmark	176	1.26	-0.24
Total	13,986		

April 1953 Danish Folketing election

Parties	Vote		
Parties	Votes	%	+ / -
Venstre	4,885	37.75	-0.86
Social Democrats	4,486	34.66	+0.51
Conservatives	1,235	9.54	+0.98
Justice Party of Denmark	1,112	8.59	-2.09
Social Liberals	959	7.41	+0.78
Communist Party of Denmark	194	1.50	+0.13
Danish Unity	71	0.55	New
Total	12,942		

1950 Danish Folketing election

Parties	Vote		
Parties	Votes	%	+ / -
Venstre	5,291	38.61	-6.54
Social Democrats	4,680	34.15	+0.77
Justice Party of Denmark	1,463	10.68	+4.44
Conservatives	1,173	8.56	+1.63
Social Liberals	908	6.63	+1.19
Communist Party of Denmark	188	1.37	-0.56
Total	13,703		

=== General elections in the 1940s ===
1947 Danish Folketing election

Parties	Vote		
Parties	Votes	%	+ / -
Venstre	6,277	45.15	+2.37
Social Democrats	4,640	33.38	+1.23
Conservatives	963	6.93	-1.14
Justice Party of Denmark	868	6.24	+2.86
Social Liberals	756	5.44	-2.16
Communist Party of Denmark	269	1.93	-2.02
Danish Unity	129	0.93	-1.12
Total	13,902		

1945 Danish Folketing election

Parties	Vote		
Parties	Votes	%	+ / -
Venstre	5,867	42.78	+8.95
Social Democrats	4,410	32.15	-5.71
Conservatives	1,107	8.07	-1.81
Social Liberals	1,042	7.60	-1.21
Communist Party of Denmark	542	3.95	New
Justice Party of Denmark	463	3.38	-0.05
Danish Unity	281	2.05	+0.67
Niels Lauritsen	3	0.02	New
Total	13,715		

1943 Danish Folketing election

Parties	Vote		
Parties	Votes	%	+ / -
Social Democrats	5,114	37.86	+2.13
Venstre	4,569	33.83	+1.78
Conservatives	1,334	9.88	+0.84
Social Liberals	1,190	8.81	+0.65
Farmers' Party	489	3.62	-3.12
Justice Party of Denmark	463	3.43	-1.64
Danish Unity	186	1.38	+0.85
National Socialist Workers' Party of Denmark	162	1.20	-0.17
Total	13,507		

=== General elections in the 1930s ===
1939 Danish Folketing election

Parties	Vote		
Parties	Votes	%	+ / -
Social Democrats	4,219	35.73	-1.85
Venstre	3,784	32.05	-0.39
Conservatives	1,067	9.04	+0.09
Social Liberals	963	8.16	-0.60
Farmers' Party	796	6.74	+1.19
Justice Party of Denmark	599	5.07	-0.91
National Socialist Workers' Party of Denmark	162	1.37	+0.99
Communist Party of Denmark	77	0.65	+0.30
National Cooperation	77	0.65	New
Danish Unity	63	0.53	New
Total	11,807		

1935 Danish Folketing election

Parties	Vote		
Parties	Votes	%	+ / -
Social Democrats	4,493	37.58	+2.38
Venstre	3,879	32.44	-7.63
Conservatives	1,070	8.95	-1.14
Social Liberals	1,048	8.76	-1.47
Justice Party of Denmark	715	5.98	+1.71
Independent People's Party	664	5.55	New
National Socialist Workers' Party of Denmark	46	0.38	New
Communist Party of Denmark	42	0.35	+0.21
Total	11,957		

1932 Danish Folketing election

Parties	Vote		
Parties	Votes	%	+ / -
Venstre	4,716	40.07	-3.77
Social Democrats	4,143	35.20	+0.44
Social Liberals	1,204	10.23	-2.29
Conservatives	1,188	10.09	+3.58
Justice Party of Denmark	502	4.27	+1.89
Communist Party of Denmark	16	0.14	New
Total	11,769		

=== General elections in the 1920s ===
1929 Danish Folketing election

Parties	Vote		
Parties	Votes	%	+ / -
Venstre	4,949	43.84	-0.80
Social Democrats	3,924	34.76	+3.26
Social Liberals	1,413	12.52	-1.60
Conservatives	735	6.51	-1.59
Justice Party of Denmark	269	2.38	+0.80
Total	11,290		

1926 Danish Folketing election

Parties	Vote		
Parties	Votes	%	+ / -
Venstre	4,733	44.64	-1.17
Social Democrats	3,340	31.50	-0.12
Social Liberals	1,497	14.12	-0.85
Conservatives	859	8.10	+1.37
Justice Party of Denmark	168	1.58	+0.71
Communist Party of Denmark	6	0.06	New
Total	10,603		

1924 Danish Folketing election

Parties	Vote		
Parties	Votes	%	+ / -
Venstre	4,634	45.81	-6.92
Social Democrats	3,199	31.62	+3.31
Social Liberals	1,514	14.97	+4.74
Conservatives	681	6.73	+2.03
Justice Party of Denmark	88	0.87	New
Total	10,116		

September 1920 Danish Folketing election

Parties	Vote		
Parties	Votes	%	+ / -
Venstre	5,224	52.73	-2.56
Social Democrats	2,805	28.31	+3.86
Social Liberals	1,013	10.23	-0.44
Conservatives	466	4.70	-0.38
Industry Party	391	3.95	-0.52
Danish Left Socialist Party	8	0.08	New
Total	9,907		

July 1920 Danish Folketing election

Parties	Vote		
Parties	Votes	%	+ / -
Venstre	4,572	55.29	+1.48
Social Democrats	2,022	24.45	-0.71
Social Liberals	882	10.67	-1.25
Conservatives	420	5.08	+0.01
Industry Party	370	4.47	+0.45
Alfred M. R. Andersen	3	0.04	+0.02
Total	8,269		

April 1920 Danish Folketing election

Parties	Vote	
Parties	Votes	%
Venstre	4,669	53.81
Social Democrats	2,183	25.16
Social Liberals	1,034	11.92
Conservatives	440	5.07
Industry Party	349	4.02
Alfred M. R. Andersen	2	0.02
Total	8,677	

== European Parliament elections results ==
2024 European Parliament election in Denmark

Parties	Vote		
Parties	Votes	%	+ / -
Green Left	8,200	18.95	+5.74
Social Democrats	7,006	16.19	-6.60
Venstre	6,684	15.45	-9.49
Conservatives	3,817	8.82	+2.8
Social Liberals	3,302	7.63	-2.60
Liberal Alliance	2,995	6.92	+4.67
Moderates	2,896	6.69	New
Denmark Democrats	2,892	6.68	New
Red–Green Alliance	2,250	5.20	+0.51
Danish People's Party	2,120	4.90	-4.54
The Alternative	1,107	2.56	-0.85
Total	43,269		

2019 European Parliament election in Denmark

Parties	Vote		
Parties	Votes	%	+ / -
Venstre	11,548	24.94	+4.82
Social Democrats	10,552	22.79	+3.72
Green Left	6,116	13.21	+1.04
Social Liberals	4,736	10.23	+3.34
Danish People's Party	4,369	9.44	-14.39
Conservatives	2,789	6.02	-1.76
Red–Green Alliance	2,169	4.69	New
The Alternative	1,579	3.41	New
People's Movement against the EU	1,395	3.01	-3.99
Liberal Alliance	1,042	2.25	-0.88
Total	46,295		

2014 European Parliament election in Denmark

Parties	Vote		
Parties	Votes	%	+ / -
Danish People's Party	8,818	23.83	+9.91
Venstre	7,445	20.12	-3.14
Social Democrats	7,058	19.07	-3.49
Green Left	4,502	12.17	-3.59
Conservatives	2,879	7.78	-3.85
People's Movement against the EU	2,590	7.00	+1.21
Social Liberals	2,550	6.89	+3.00
Liberal Alliance	1,160	3.13	+2.48
Total	37,002		

2009 European Parliament election in Denmark

Parties	Vote		
Parties	Votes	%	+ / -
Venstre	8,879	23.26	+0.98
Social Democrats	8,611	22.56	-8.89
Green Left	6,017	15.76	+8.16
Danish People's Party	5,315	13.92	+7.77
Conservatives	4,438	11.63	+0.81
People's Movement against the EU	2,209	5.79	+1.94
Social Liberals	1,486	3.89	-2.13
June Movement	965	2.53	-8.62
Liberal Alliance	250	0.65	New
Total	38,170		

2004 European Parliament election in Denmark

Parties	Vote		
Parties	Votes	%	+ / -
Social Democrats	6,075	31.45	+15.41
Venstre	4,304	22.28	-5.00
June Movement	2,153	11.15	-6.35
Conservatives	2,090	10.82	+3.32
Green Left	1,468	7.60	+1.78
Danish People's Party	1,189	6.15	+1.25
Social Liberals	1,162	6.02	-2.89
People's Movement against the EU	744	3.85	-2.44
Christian Democrats	133	0.69	-0.76
Total	19,318		

1999 European Parliament election in Denmark

Parties	Vote		
Parties	Votes	%	+ / -
Venstre	5,451	27.28	+4.56
June Movement	3,498	17.50	+3.03
Social Democrats	3,206	16.04	+1.77
Social Liberals	1,781	8.91	+0.57
Conservatives	1,499	7.50	-10.50
People's Movement against the EU	1,257	6.29	-3.65
Green Left	1,163	5.82	-2.85
Danish People's Party	980	4.90	New
Centre Democrats	860	4.30	+3.60
Christian Democrats	290	1.45	+0.98
Progress Party	95	0.48	-1.92
Total	19,985		

1994 European Parliament election in Denmark

Parties	Vote		
Parties	Votes	%	+ / -
Venstre	4,739	22.72	+3.03
Conservatives	3,754	18.00	+3.42
June Movement	3,017	14.47	New
Social Democrats	2,977	14.27	-7.63
People's Movement against the EU	2,074	9.94	-8.43
Green Left	1,809	8.67	+1.30
Social Liberals	1,739	8.34	+5.29
Progress Party	500	2.40	-3.29
Centre Democrats	147	0.70	-7.19
Christian Democrats	99	0.47	-0.99
Total	20,855		

1989 European Parliament election in Denmark

Parties	Vote		
Parties	Votes	%	+ / -
Social Democrats	3,709	21.90	+2.78
Venstre	3,336	19.69	+1.90
People's Movement against the EU	3,111	18.37	-1.11
Conservatives	2,470	14.58	-4.25
Centre Democrats	1,337	7.89	+0.48
Green Left	1,249	7.37	-1.05
Progress Party	963	5.69	+2.70
Social Liberals	516	3.05	-0.76
Christian Democrats	248	1.46	+0.12
Total	16,939		

1984 European Parliament election in Denmark

Parties	Vote	
Parties	Votes	%
People's Movement against the EU	3,585	19.48
Social Democrats	3,517	19.12
Conservatives	3,464	18.83
Venstre	3,273	17.79
Green Left	1,549	8.42
Centre Democrats	1,363	7.41
Social Liberals	701	3.81
Progress Party	551	2.99
Christian Democrats	246	1.34
Left Socialists	150	0.82
Total	18,399	

== Referendums ==
2022 Danish European Union opt-out referendum

Option	Votes	%
✓ YES	34,031	72.03
X NO	13,214	27.97

2015 Danish European Union opt-out referendum

Option	Votes	%
✓ YES	23,967	51.83
X NO	22,274	48.17

2014 Danish Unified Patent Court membership referendum

Option	Votes	%
✓ YES	23,673	66.49
X NO	11,931	33.51

2009 Danish Act of Succession referendum

Option	Votes	%
✓ YES	31,467	87.86
X NO	4,347	12.14

2000 Danish euro referendum

Option	Votes	%
X NO	17,581	50.22
✓ YES	17,425	49.78

1998 Danish Amsterdam Treaty referendum

Option	Votes	%
✓ YES	17,507	58.08
X NO	12,636	41.92

1993 Danish Maastricht Treaty referendum

Option	Votes	%
✓ YES	20,289	60.95
X NO	12,998	39.05

1992 Danish Maastricht Treaty referendum

Option	Votes	%
✓ YES	16,569	52.47
X NO	15,012	47.53

1986 Danish Single European Act referendum

Option	Votes	%
✓ YES	17,112	61.57
X NO	10,680	38.43

1972 Danish European Communities membership referendum

Option	Votes	%
✓ YES	17,554	68.34
X NO	8,134	31.66

1953 Danish constitutional and electoral age referendum

Option	Votes	%
✓ YES	7,247	80.93
X NO	1,708	19.07
23 years	5,304	58.25
21 years	3,802	41.75

1939 Danish constitutional referendum

Option	Votes	%
✓ YES	4,480	84.74
X NO	807	15.26
