= List of novelty human election candidates =

Notable satirical candidates in global elections

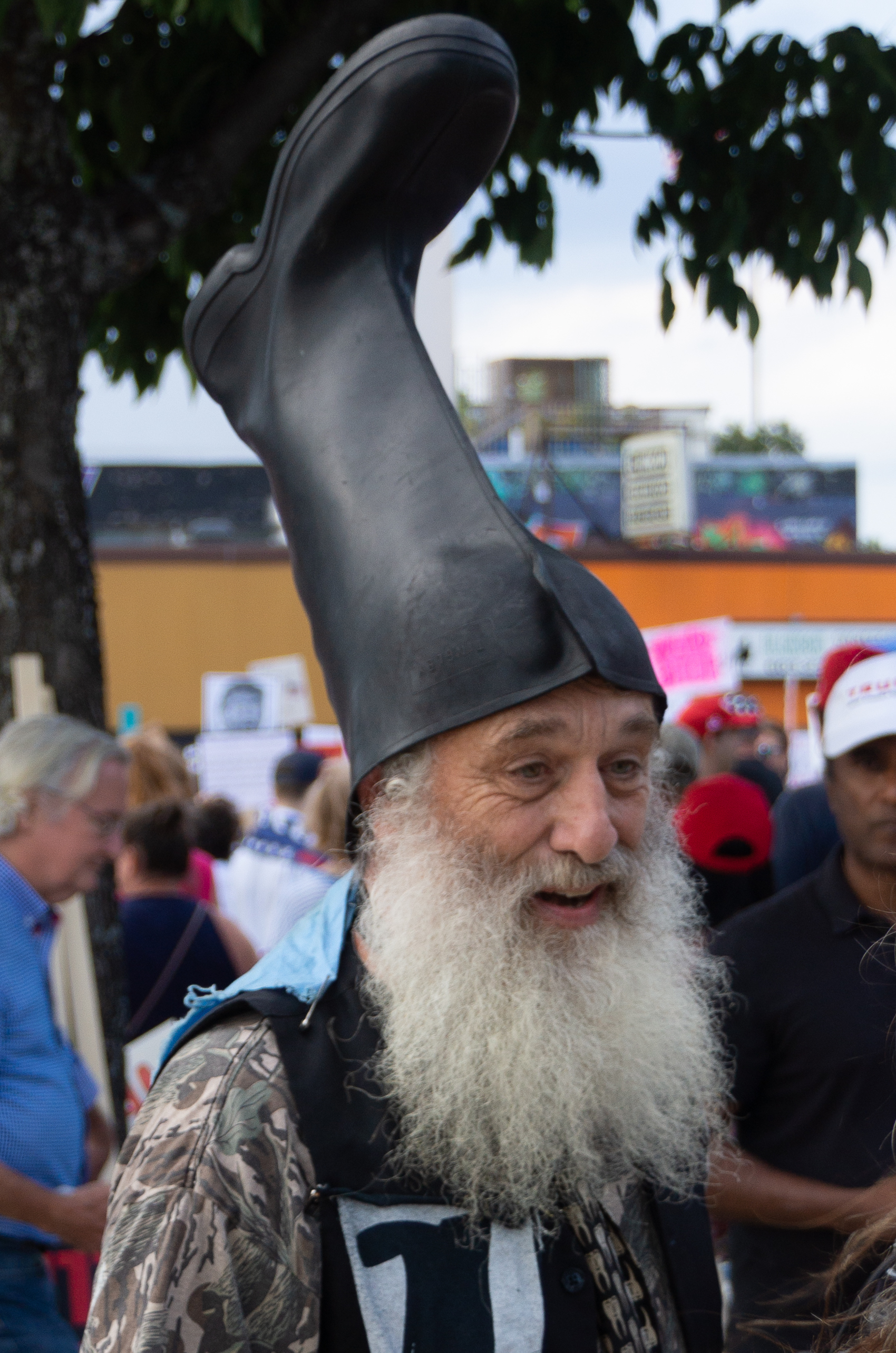
Vermin Supreme, one of the best-known contemporary novelty candidates in the United States.

The following is a list of notable human novelty candidates, also known as satirical candidates, parody candidates or joke candidates, which are people who run for political office in an election as a form of satire or protest, without seriously expecting to win. Despite their candidacy, they achieved a degree of notability in the public media for their actions.

== In the United Kingdom ==
=== Captain Beany ===
Captain Beany is a British eccentric and charity fundraiser in Sandfields, Port Talbot, South Wales. Beany has been a candidate in local and general elections throughout Wales. In 2000, he formed the New Millennium Bean Party, of which he was the sole member. Beany contested Aberavon again in the 2010 general election, receiving 558 votes (1.8%), placing seventh out of eight candidates, ahead of UKIP candidate Joe Callan. In the 2015 general election, support for Beany more than doubled, to 1,137 votes (3.6%), who stood as an independent, placing sixth out of nine candidates ahead of the Green, Socialist Labour and TUSC candidates in Aberavon. In the 2024 general election, Beany stood as an independent in the newly created constituency of Aberafan Maesteg, gaining 618 votes (1.7%) coming seventh out of eight candidates, ahead of Rhiannon Morrissey of the Heritage Party. He announced he would not stand for any further elections.

=== Count Binface ===
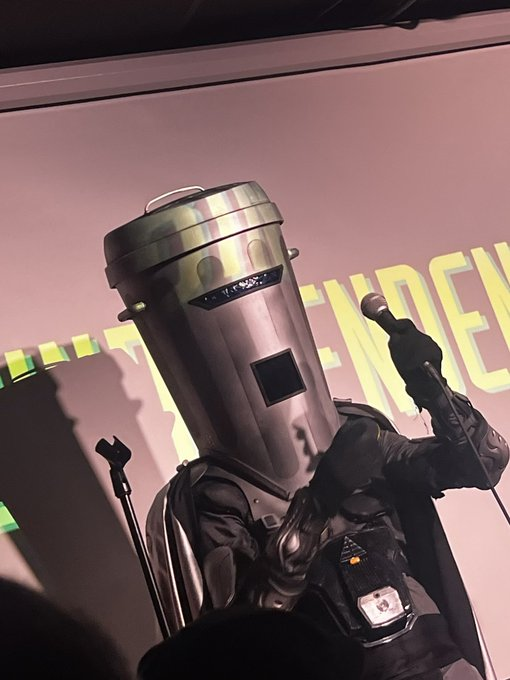
Count Binface in 2024

Count Binface is a satirical novelty candidate created by the British comedian Jonathan David Harvey in 2018. Describing himself as an alien space warrior from the planet Sigma IX, Binface wears a black and grey uniform, a silver cape, and a helmet resembling a dustbin.

Binface stood as a candidate for Uxbridge and South Ruislip in the 2019 United Kingdom general election against the then prime minister, Boris Johnson, and again at the 2023 by-election that followed Johnson's resignation. He also stood in the London Mayoral elections in 2021 and 2024. In the 2024 general election, Binface stood against the prime minister, Rishi Sunak, in his Richmond and Northallerton constituency. Originally standing as an independent, since 2023 his affiliation has been given as Count Binface Party on ballot papers.

In 2026, Count Binface declared he would stand in the Clacton On-Sea by-election, which was triggered by former and now elect-MP Nigel Farage. On 14 August, Count Binface secured a career-best finish in his political career, placing second with a vote count of 9,455. Farage won the by-election, yet failed to turn up to the announcement of the results.

=== Lord Buckethead ===
Lord Buckethead is a novelty candidate who has stood in four British general elections since 1987, portrayed by several individuals. He poses as an intergalactic villain resembling the Star Wars character Darth Vader. In the 1987 general election, Lee stood as Lord Buckethead, representing the Gremloids Party, against the Conservative prime minister Margaret Thatcher in her constituency in Finchley, London. He campaigned to demolish Birmingham to make way for a spaceport. He received 131 votes. In the 1992 general election, Lord Buckethead stood against the Conservative prime minister John Major in Huntingdon, winning 107 votes (0.1%). In 2017, the comedian Jonathan Harvey stood as Lord Buckethead against Theresa May in Maidenhead in the 2017 general election. Lord Buckethead's televised appearance standing next to May went viral. The Lord Buckethead Twitter account became active again in 2019. That year, Lord Buckethead, now played by David Hughes, appeared at People's Vote rallies calling for a second Brexit referendum. He won 125 votes.

=== Howling Laud Hope ===
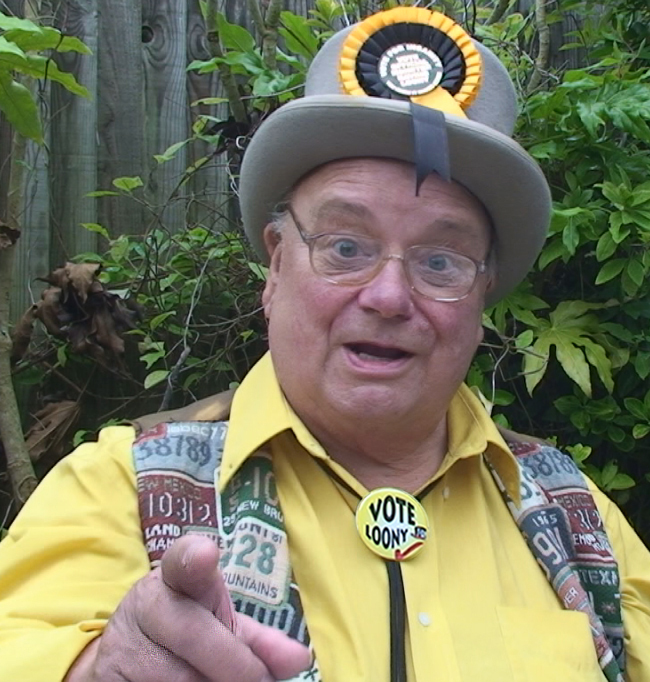
Alan 'Howling Laud' Hope in 2010

Alan Hope (born 16 June 1942), known politically as Howling Laud Hope, is a British politician and former publican who is the current Leader of the Official Monster Raving Loony Party (OMRLP). On the death of the party's founder Screaming Lord Sutch in 1999, Hope and his pet cat, Catmando, were jointly elected as leaders of the OMRLP. Since June 2002 Hope has been the party's sole leader following Catmando's death in a road accident. Hope was the first-ever OMRLP candidate to be elected to public office, when he was elected unopposed to a seat on Ashburton Town Council in Devon in 1987. He subsequently became the Mayor of Ashburton in 1998. Hope is the only OMRLP candidate to have been elected to public office, although an ex-member, Stuart Hughes, won a seat on East Devon District Council for the Raving Loony Green Giant Party in 1991.

=== Stuart "Basil Fawlty" Hughes ===
Stuart Hughes is an English politician who has represented voters at all three levels of local government in Devon, in the West of England. Before 1997, when he joined the Conservative Party, and 1993, when he ran as an independent, he was a member of the Official Monster Raving Loony Party before founding the Raving Loony Green Giant Party. He changed his name to Stuart Basil Fawlty Hughes and, in 1991, was elected to East Devon District Council and Sidmouth Town Council, the first "Raving Loony" candidate to win a contested election.

=== Lord Toby Jug ===
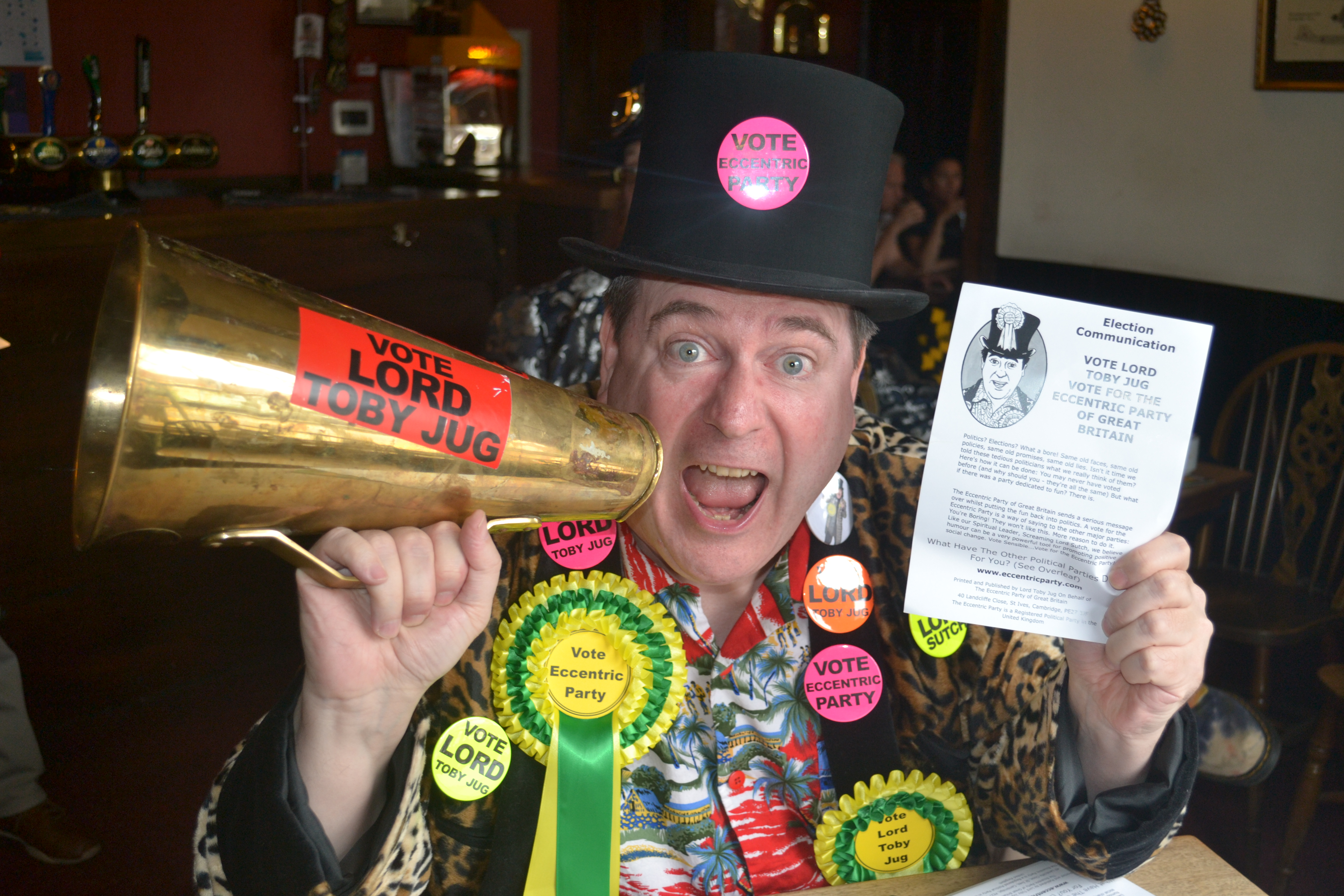
Jug at the official opening of the Ramsey Branch of the Eccentric Party in 2016

Lord Toby Jug was a British politician. He was the leader of the Cambridgeshire and Huntingdonshire branch of the Official Monster Raving Loony Party, serving as the party's media officer and a prospective parliamentary candidate, until being expelled from the Loony Party in 2014. He founded The Eccentric Party of Great Britain in 2015. In January 2015 Jug founded "The Eccentric Party of Great Britain" in St Ives, after the Electoral Commission had rejected more than 30 suggested names, including the "Real Loony Party" and the "United Kingdom Independent Loony Party", for being too similar to those of other parties. In 2016, Jug briefly joined the UK Independence Party as a joke, intending to stand as leader following the resignation of Diane James; he said that he was "stunned" that the party had allowed his membership.

=== Mad Cow-Girl ===
Rosalyn Warner better known as Mad Cow-Girl, was a British nurse who contested several elections as a candidate for the Official Monster Raving Loony Party. She ran for election to the House of Commons for the Haltemprice and Howden seat in 2008 against incumbent Conservative MP David Davis, where she polled 412 votes (a vote that David Davis won comfortably). Warner was one of 26 candidates standing in the 2008 Haltemprice and Howden by-election for the seat of Conservative MP David Davis. The Independent suggested that Warner was chosen as the candidate because another candidate Banana Man would be contesting the Henley By-Election as a result of Boris Johnson resigning his Henley seat on becoming Mayor of London. The high-profile nature of the by election has led to Warner's candidature being announced on several news sites.

=== Terry Marsh ===
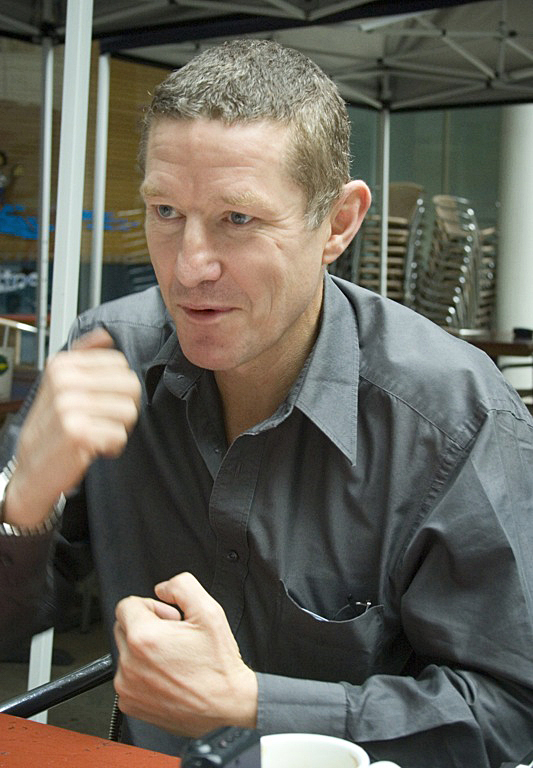
Marsh in October 2005

Terry Marsh is an English former professional boxer who was an undefeated world champion in the light welterweight division. Marsh changed his name by deed poll to "None Of The Above X" and stood in the 2010 and 2015 UK general elections as an independent candidate in protest against there being no option to vote for "none of the above". In other UK elections Marsh has symbolically voted for none of the above by leaving the polling station carrying his uncast ballot paper. In 2009, he set up a new political party, NOTA, which stands for "None of the Above".

=== Niko Omilana ===
Nikolas Daniel Adegbajumo Omilana is a British YouTuber, influencer, and perennial political candidate. He is known for posting prank videos on YouTube and running as an independent candidate in the 2021 London mayoral election and the 2024 UK general election, being unsuccessful in both elections. During Sunak's concession speech, Omilana attracted media attention when he pranked Sunak by holding up a piece of paper with the letter "L" behind him, which referred to Sunak as a "Loser".

=== Tom Scott ===
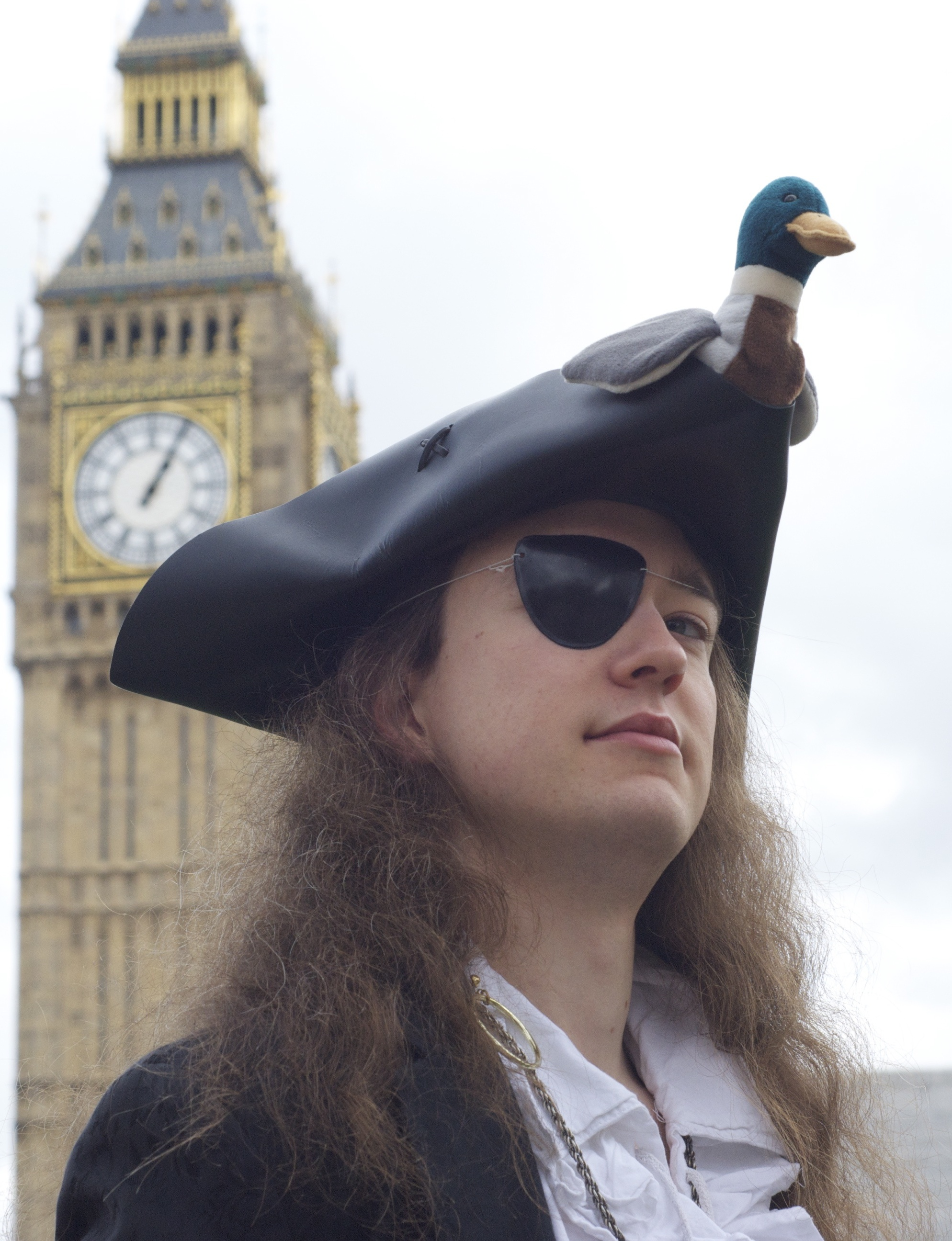
Scott as "Mad Cap'n Tom" in 2010

Before his YouTube career, Tom Scott was nominated by his friends to run for student president at the University of York Students' Union, under the guise of his Talk Like a Pirate Day persona, "Mad Cap'n Tom Scott". Despite running as a joke, he gained almost 3,000 votes, won the election, and served as the organisation's 48th president, in 2008. When running for Parliament in the Cities of London and Westminster constituency as a joke candidate in 2010, Scott used the character – at the time, he described his chances of winning in the safe Conservative seat of Westminster as "Somewhere 'twixt a snowball's chance in hell an' zero." He received 84 votes (0.2% of the total), finishing in last place behind Pirate Party UK.

=== Bobby Smith ===
Bobby Smith is a British political and fathers' rights activist. He is the founder and leader of the Give Me Back Elmo party which he set up to seek to change the law in family courts after his own experiences. Smith stood in the Witney constituency for the Give Me Back Elmo Party in the 2015 general election. He and the party received media coverage as Smith and two other members of the party waited with placards to greet the Prime Minister, David Cameron, at the polling station where he cast his vote on election day.

=== Screaming Lord Sutch ===
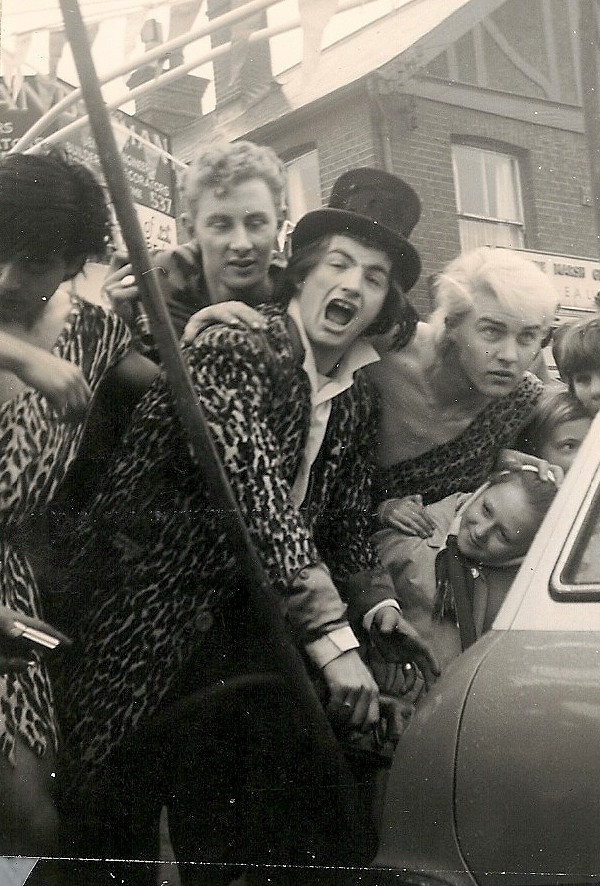
Sutch (centre, with top hat) c. 1967

Screaming Lord Sutch was an English musician and perennial parliamentary candidate. He was the founder of the Official Monster Raving Loony Party and served as its leader from 1983 to 1999, during which time he stood in numerous parliamentary elections. He holds the record for contesting the most Parliamentary elections: 39 between 1963 and 1997. In the 1960s, Sutch stood in parliamentary elections, often as representative of the National Teenage Party. His first was in 1963, when he contested the Stratford by-election caused by the resignation of John Profumo. He gained 208 votes. His next was at the 1966 general election when he stood in Harold Wilson's Huyton constituency. Here, he received 585 votes.

== In the United States ==
=== Victor Aloysius Meyers ===
Victor Aloysius Meyers was an American politician and jazz bandleader living in Seattle, Washington. His frequent confrontations with authorities over Prohibition laws made him a local celebrity. In 1932, Doug Welch, an editor at the Seattle Times, encouraged Meyers to enter the nonpartisan mayoral race. Welch saw Meyers as a joke candidate he could use as an anchor for satiric stories on the race. Meyers finished the race in sixth place in a field of ten. Later that year, he entered the Democratic primary for lieutenant governor, without being clear on the duties of the office. He won the primary and general election going on to serve 20 years as the 11th Lieutenant Governor of Washington, and an additional eight years as the tenth Secretary of State of Washington. He was the first Democratic Lieutenant Governor of Washington.

=== Nobody for President ===
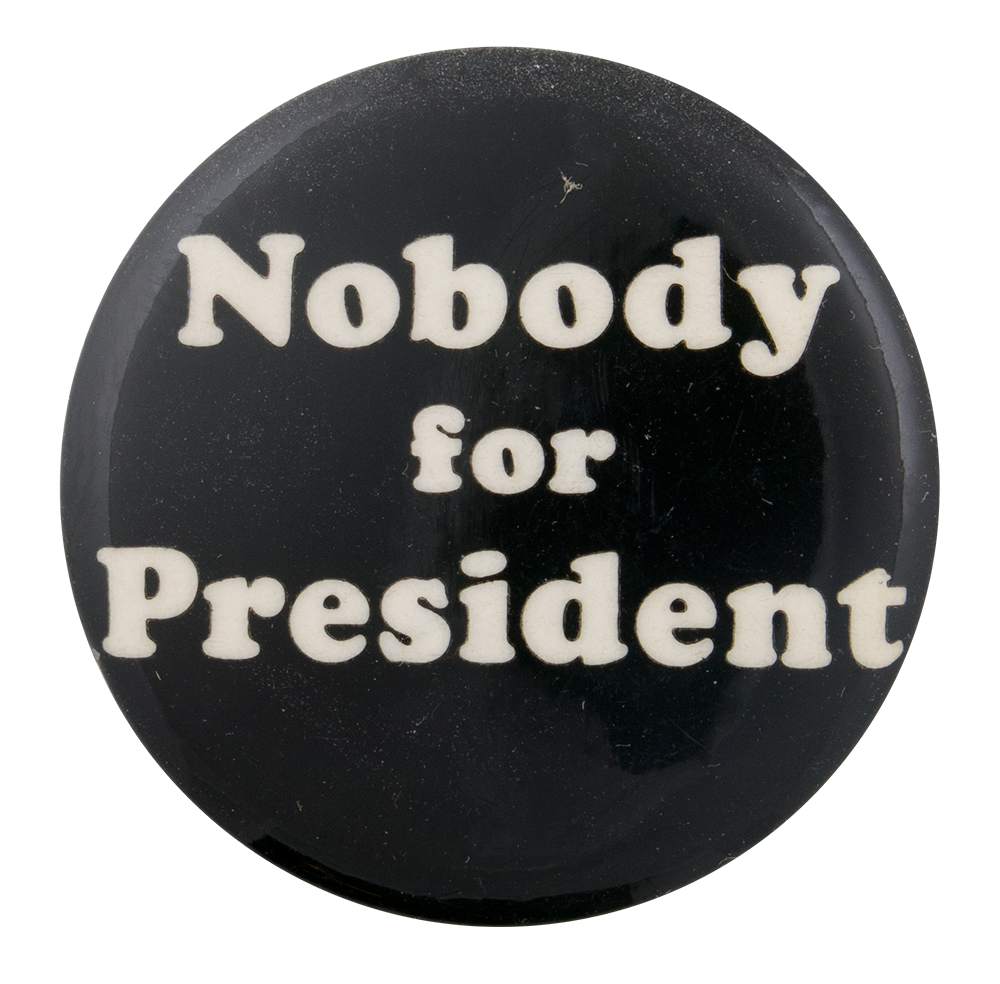
A 1976 Nobody for President campaign button

Nobody for President was a parodic campaign for the 1976 United States presidential election, as well as the 1980, 1984, and 1988 presidential elections. Wavy Gravy, master of ceremonies for the Woodstock Festival and official clown of the Grateful Dead, is believed to have nominated Nobody at the Yippie national convention outside the Republican National Convention in Kansas City in 1976.

=== Deez Nuts ===
Deez Nuts was a satirical presidential candidate portrayed by Brady C. Olson who ran for president of the United States in 2016. On July 26, 2015, Olson—then 15 years of age, and a resident of Wallingford, Iowa—filed a statement of Deez Nuts's presidential candidacy with the Federal Election Commission. In polls conducted by Public Policy Polling in Iowa, Minnesota, and North Carolina in mid-August 2015, Deez Nuts polled at eight, eight, and nine percent, respectively, garnering media attention.

=== Vermin Supreme ===
Vermin Love Supreme is an American performance artist and activist who has run as a novelty candidate in various local, state, and national elections in the United States. He served as a member of the Libertarian Party's judicial committee. Supreme is known for wearing a boot as a hat and carrying a large toothbrush, and has said that if elected President of the United States, he will pass a law requiring people to brush their teeth. He has campaigned on a platform of zombie apocalypse awareness and time travel research, and promised a free pony for every American.

=== Unabomber for President ===
Unabomber for President was a political campaign with the aim of electing the "Unabomber" as a write-in candidate in the 1996 presidential election. The campaign was launched in Boston in September 1995 by Lydia Eccles – a Boston artist who had long harbored concerns about "totalitarian tendencies in technology" – and antinatalist Chris Korda. It took the overt form of a political action committee, Unabomber Political Action Committee (UNAPACK). Influenced initially by ideas of the Situationist International, the group included anarchists, hardcore punks, 1960s counter-culturalists, eco-socialists, pacifists, militants and primitivists. Its supporters included decentralized anarchist collective CrimethInc. and the Church of Euthanasia.

=== Prince Mongo ===
Prince Mongo was an eccentric businessman and perennial candidate for Mayor of Memphis, Tennessee from the 1970s to 2010s. He claimed to be an alien from the planet Zambodia born 333 years ago. Born Robert Hodges, he died August 10, 2026.

=== Kibo ===
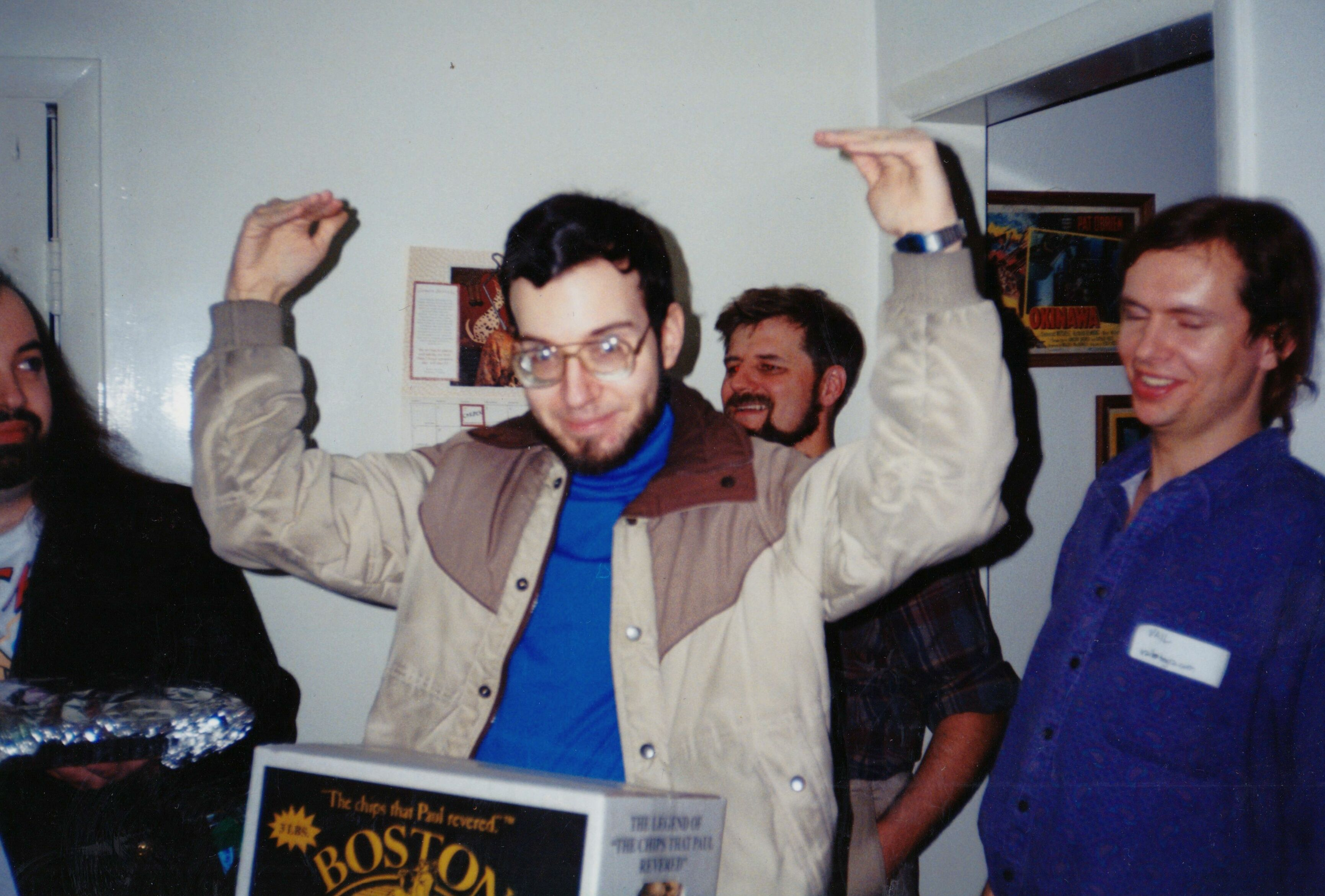
Parry in 1993

James Parry, known for his pseudonym "Kibo", is an internet personality known for his humor on Usenet. In 1992, Parry launched a spoof campaign for president despite being at the age of 25 (ten years younger than the constitutional minimum age for election).

== In Canada ==
=== Gregory Guevara ===
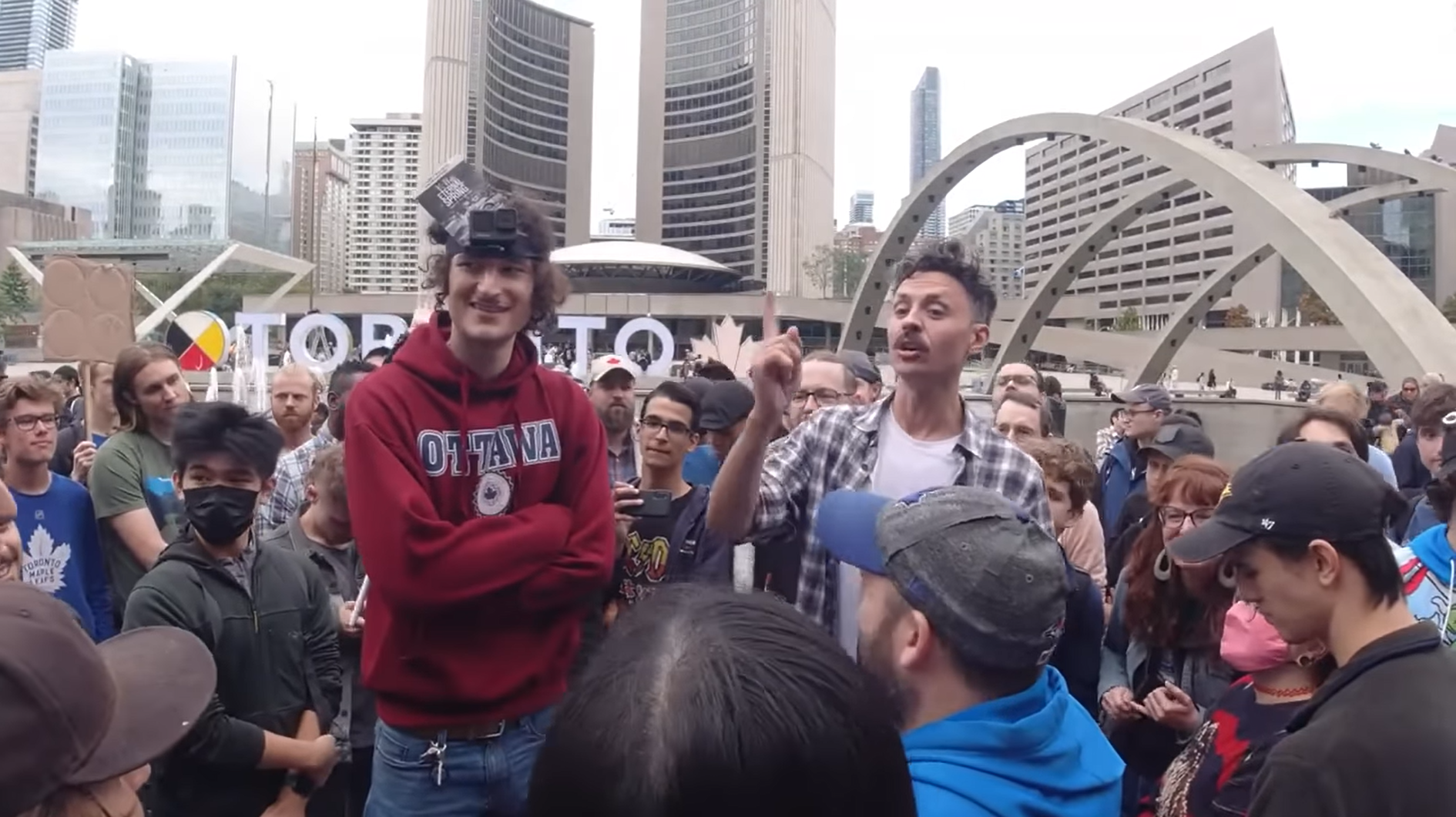
Guevara (middle left) and Canadian YouTuber J.J. McCullough at a political rally, in Toronto

Gregory Guevara, known online as Jreg, JrEg or jREG, is a Canadian YouTuber, musical artist, journalist, political satirist, and politician. In August 2022, Guevara announced a "post ironic" campaign for the 2022 Ottawa municipal election, in which he claimed to be running as both a libertarian and a socialist. Guevara was unsuccessful in the election receiving 584 votes.

== In Ukraine ==
=== Darth Vader ===
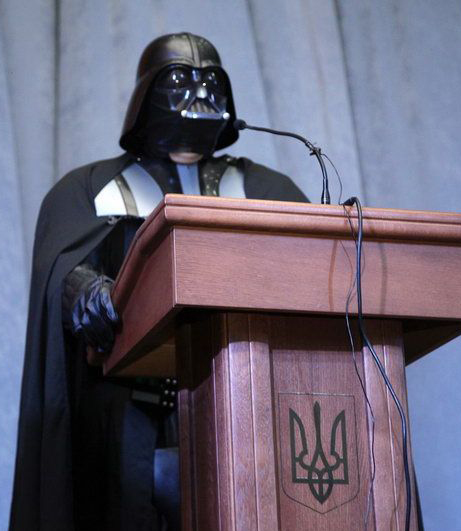
"Darth Oleksiiovych Vader", a candidate in 2014 Ukrainian presidential election

Since 2012, individuals adopting the name of the Star Wars character Darth Vader (Ukrainian: Дарт Вейдер) have entered local, presidential, and parliamentary elections in Ukraine. "Vader" also participated in political and social activism, notably in Odesa Oblast.

== In Denmark ==
=== Jacob Haugaard ===
Daniel Jacob Haugaard (born 12 May 1952) is a Danish-Faroese comedian, actor, musician, composer, writer, TV host and former representative in the Danish Parliament. Haugaard ran for every parliamentary election as a joke from 1979 onwards, until he unexpectedly won a seat in the 1994 general election representing the area around Aarhus. Running as an independent (though representing SABAE - the Union of Conscientiously Work-Shy Elements), he attracted 23,253 votes, enough to become one of the local members for the Aarhus area in the Parliament of Denmark from 1994–98. He promised better weather; right to impotency; Nutella in field rations (which was actually implemented); and shorter queues in supermarkets. Asylum rated his win in the parliamentary election the 11th greatest prank of all time.

== In France ==
=== Ferdinand Lop ===
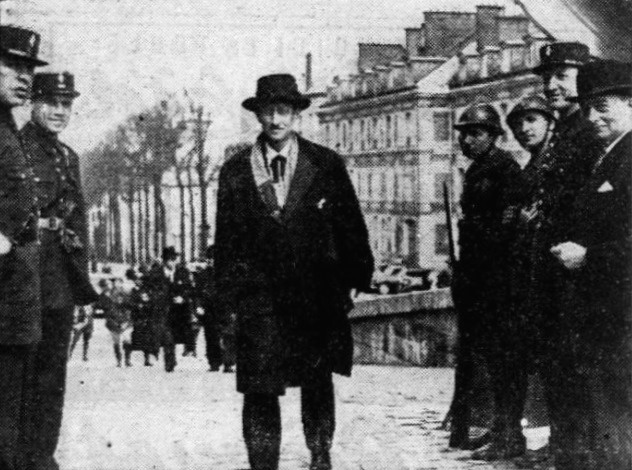
Ferdinand Samuel in 1939

Ferdinand Samuel Lop was a French Jewish journalist, draughtsman, English language teacher, writer, poet, and humourist. He stood repeatedly as a satirical candidate for the French Presidency and for the Académie française.

== In Serbia ==
=== Ljubiša Preletačević ===
Ljubiša Preletačević is a Serbian comedian and political activist best known for his role as the satirical fictional politician named Ljubiša Preletačević "Beli". He was formerly the leader of a parody political party Sarmu probo nisi (SPN) formed in Mladenovac in 2016. His party participated in the 2016 local council election in the municipality of Mladenovac, winning 20 percent of the votes and 12 seats. He participated in the 2017 Serbian presidential election under his Preletačević persona, finishing third with 9.44% of the votes. In 2018, Maksimović left the "party".

== In the Philippines ==
=== Pascual Racuyal ===
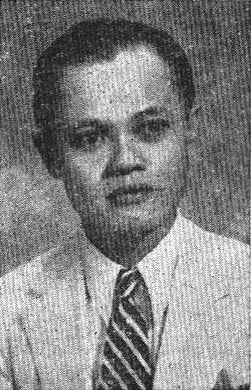
Racuyal in 1949

Pascual Borbon Racuyal was a Filipino eccentric and aspirant for the Philippine presidency, whose persistent attempts at the presidency earned him folk status. Racuyal sought the presidency in every Philippine presidential election beginning in 1935 against Manuel L. Quezon, Emilio Aguinaldo, and Gregorio Aglipay until 1986 (against Ferdinand Marcos and Corazon Aquino). Racuyal made it to the ballot twice. In 1935, he got 158 votes or less than 0.01% of the vote. In 1969, he got 778 votes, or just over 0.01% of the vote.

=== Elly Pamatong ===
Elly Velez Lao Pamatong was a Filipino lawyer who participated in multiple elections for multiple positions. Pamatong's candidacy was accepted for the 1987 Philippine Senate election. Pamatong finished last in 2002 Zamboanga del Norte's 1st congressional district special election with just over 1% of the vote. He ran for president of the Philippines in 2004 but was disqualified for being a nuisance candidate. Pamatong then ran for governor of Pampanga in 2007, but lost to Eddie Panlilio. He attempted to run for president again in 2010 but was again disqualified. In the 2013 Philippine House of Representatives elections, he ran in Davao City's 1st district, but got less than 1% of the vote. He attempted to run in the 2016 Philippine presidential election but was again disqualified. Pamatong died in 2021. Election watchers sought for him in the 2022 Philippine presidential election, with his family announcing his death months earlier.

== In Mexico ==
=== Superbarrio Gómez ===
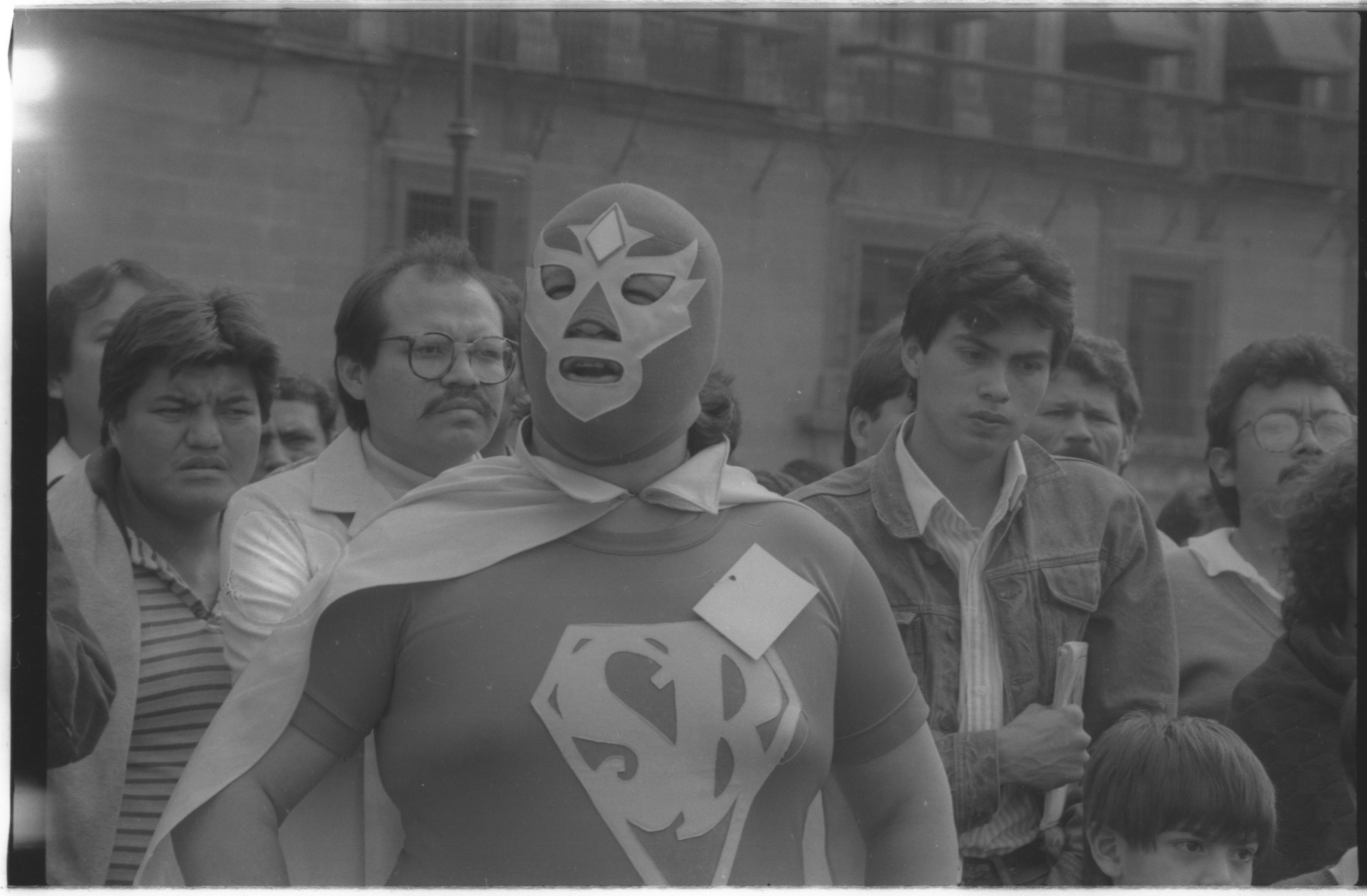
Gómez in the 1980s

Superbarrio Gómez is a Luchador-themed "real-life superhero" who has mostly engaged in social activism. The character was created in 1987, motivated by the consequences of the 1985 Mexico City earthquake which left thousands of residents homeless. His initial actions were confronting and indimidating landlords to thwart evictions of tenants. In 1988, he was an informal presidential candidate for the 1988 Mexican general election, and also later held mock campaign rallies both in Mexico and the United States for the 1996 United States Presidential Election, despite being ineligible to run as a foreign national.

== See also ==
- Novelty candidate
- List of frivolous political parties
- Non-human electoral candidates
- List of animals in political office
- Nuisance candidate, Philippine political term for a candidate deemed unfit to run for public office
