= Headwind and tailwind =

Type of wind by direction of travel

A headwind is a wind that blows against the direction of travel of an object, while a tailwind blows in the direction of travel. A headwind decreases the object's speed and increases the time required to reach its destination, while a tailwind has the opposite effect.

The terms are also used metaphorically in business and elsewhere about circumstances where progress is made harder (headwind) or easier (tailwind).

== Travel ==
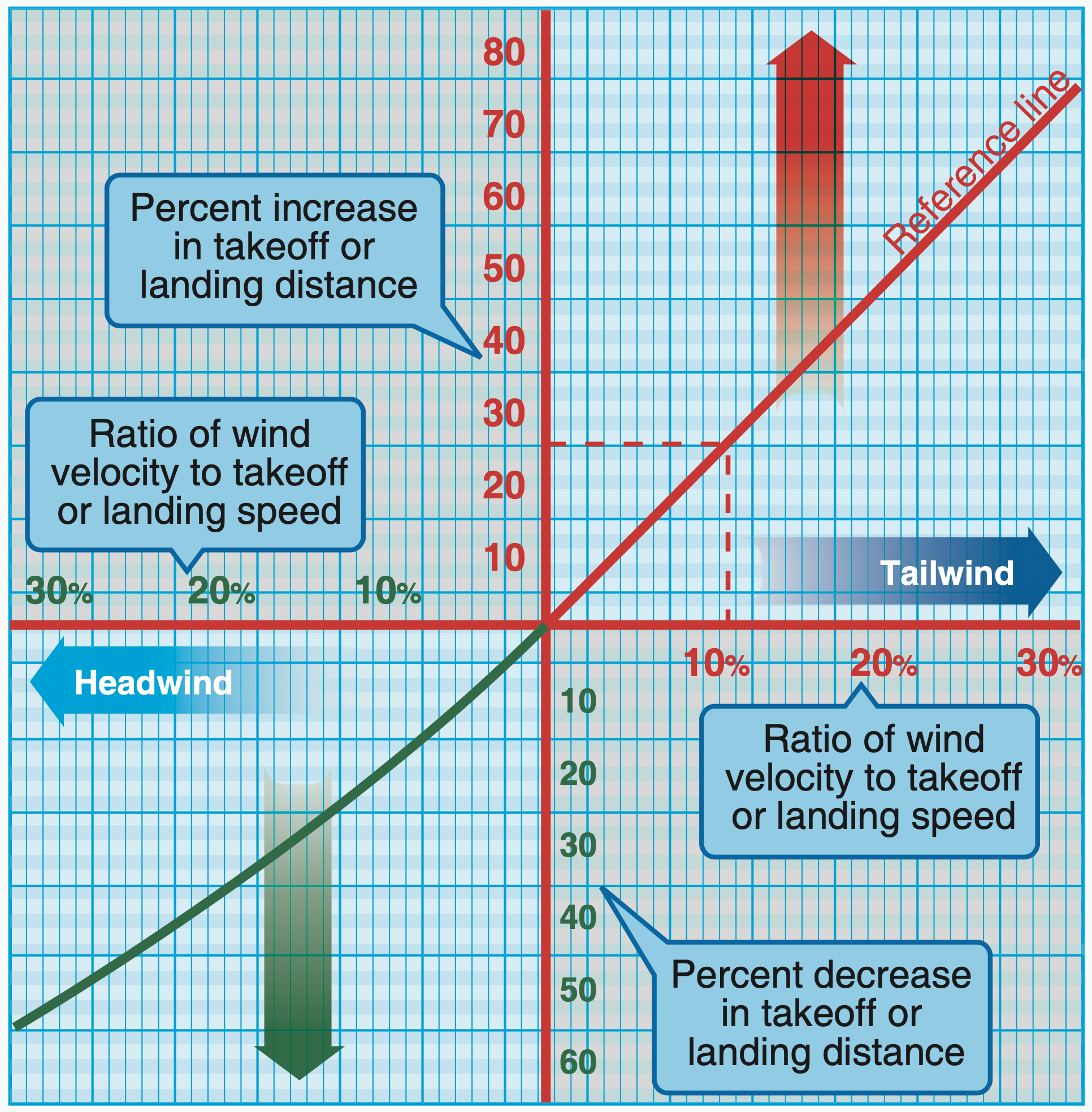
The general effect of wind by the percent change in takeoff or landing distance as a function of the ratio of wind velocity to takeoff or landing speed.

In aeronautics, a headwind is favorable in takeoffs and landings because an airfoil moving into a headwind is capable of generating greater lift than the same airfoil moving through tranquil air, or with a tailwind, at equal ground speed. As a result, aviators and air traffic controllers commonly choose to take off or land in the direction of a runway that will provide a headwind. Aircraft carriers usually turn into the wind during takeoffs and landings, and may increase their own speed. While on take-off and landing, headwinds are good because they allow the aircraft to use a shorter runway, in flight, however, headwinds are bad because they reduce the ground speed of the aircraft, which requires more fuel to get to the destination. Conversely, tailwinds are bad on take-off and landing, but are good in flight.

In sailing, a headwind may make forward movement difficult, and necessitate tacking into the wind.

In motor vehicles, wind can affect fuel consumption and top speed but is usually ignored by the driver who chooses the speed from speed limits and road conditions.

In cycling, headwind is felt strongly by cyclists. It decreases the speed and increases the advantage of drafting, i.e. riding closely together in groups. This can affect tactics in road bicycle racing. The comedian Jacob Haugaard made a pointedly absurd campaign promise of more tailwind on bicycle paths when he successfully ran as an independent in the 1994 Danish parliamentary election. Cycling in Denmark is very popular.

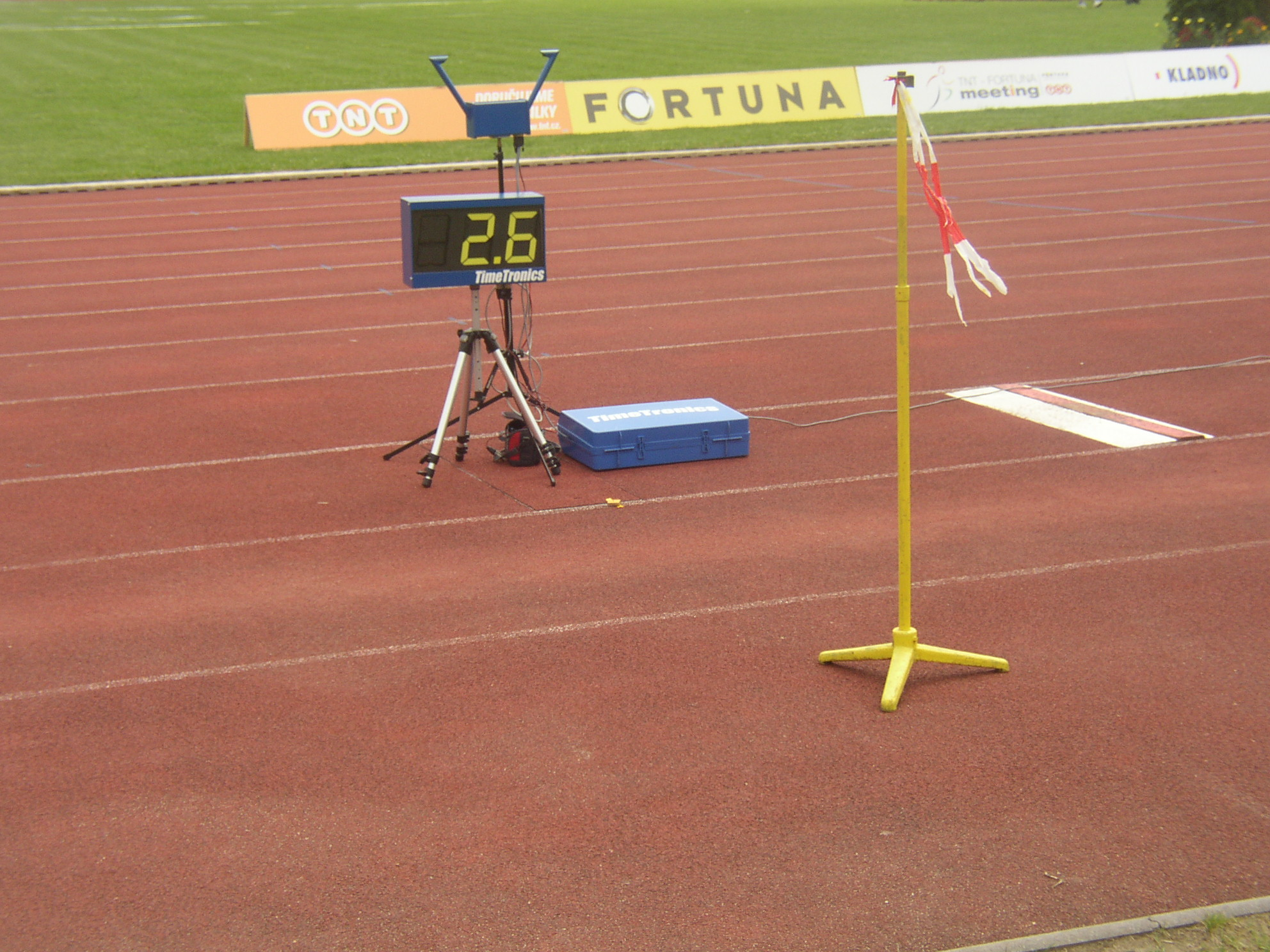
Wind indicator at a long jump runway

Tailwinds and headwinds are commonly measured in relation to the speed of vehicles — commonly air and watercraft — as well as in running events — particularly sprints up to 200 metres where athletes run in the same or mostly same direction and wind assistance from a tailwind above two metre per second is not allowed in records. This limit also applies to long jump and triple jump.

== Aeronautics calculations ==
Pilots calculate the headwind or tailwind component and the crosswind component of local wind before takeoff. The direction of wind at a runway is measured using a windsock and the speed by an anemometer, often mounted on the same post. Headwind and tailwind are opposite interpretations of the wind component which is parallel to the direction of travel, while crosswind represents the perpendicular component. Determining the ground speed of an aircraft requires the calculation of the head or tailwind.

Assume:

$A=\text{Angle of the wind origin from the direction of travel}$

$WS=\text{The measured total wind speed}$

$CW=\text{Crosswind}$

$TW=\text{Tailwind}$

$HW=\text{Headwind}$

Then

$CW=\sin(A) \cdot WS$

$HW=\cos(A) \cdot WS$

For example, if the wind is at 09015 that means the wind is currently from heading 090 degrees with a speed of 15 knots and the aircraft is taking off from runway 24; having heading of 240. The pilot prefers the runway side with less than 90 difference from wind direction, in this case Runway 06; heading 060. Here, $A=30^\circ$.

$\text{Crosswind} = \sin[30^\circ] \cdot 15 \mathsf{knots} \approx 7.5 \mathsf{knots}$

$\text{Headwind} = \cos[30^\circ] \cdot 15 \mathsf{knots} \approx 13 \mathsf{knots}$

The aircraft is said to have 7.5 knots of crosswind and 13 knots of headwind on runway 06, or 13 knots of tailwind on runway 24.

Aircraft usually have maximum tailwind and crosswind components which they cannot exceed. If the wind is at eighty degrees or above it is said to be full-cross. If the wind exceeds 100 degrees it is common practice to take off and land from the opposite end of the runway, it has a heading of 060 in the above-mentioned example.

== See also ==
- Crosswind
- Air navigation
- Thrust
- Wind assistance
- Windsock
