= Union of Conscientiously Work-Shy Elements =

Danish political party

The Union of Conscientiously Work-Shy Elements (Danish: Sammenslutning af Bevidst Arbejdssky Elementer) was an unusually successful frivolous political party in Denmark. It was founded in Aarhus in 1979 by a comedian, Jacob Haugaard (born 1952), and a few friends. Haugaard stood as an independent candidate in Aarhus County in each parliamentary election, until September 1994 when he was very unexpectedly elected to the Folketing with 23,253 personal votes, thereby winning a constituency seat (a locally based seat in parliament).

He made the following promises in the 1994 election:

- Tail winds on all cycle paths
- Better weather
- Better Christmas presents
- Less sex in school staff rooms (withdrawn during the campaign – he said it had been brought to his attention that sex in the staff room was a long-established privilege for teachers and as such could not be abolished)
- More whales in the fjord of Randers
- The right to impotence
- More Renaissance furniture in IKEA
- 8 hours of spare time, 8 hours of rest, 8 hours of sleep (a parody of a popular slogan of the eight-hour day movement: "Eight hours' labour, Eight hours' recreation, Eight hours' rest")
- Nutella in army field rations
- The placing of a public toilet in the park in Aarhus where he spent his state party funding on serving beer and sausages to his voters after each election.
- More bread for the ducks in parks

The last three promises were actually fulfilled during his term in office.

While the party had been intended as a joke, he found himself often having the deciding vote in a hung parliament, and took his duties seriously until the parliamentary election in March 1998. He then announced his retirement from politics.

== Election results ==
Map showing the share of votes Haugaard achieved in each municipality at the 1994 election.

Jacob Haugaard's election results
Year	Votes	Ref.
1979	797; 0.22%	
1981	558; 0.16%	
1984	676; 0.18%	
1987	2,275; 0.59%	
1988	3,221; 0.83%	
1990	8,717; 2.27%	
1994	23,253; 5.80%	

== Quotes ==
- "If work is so healthy, then why not give it to the sick?"
- "Work? We can't be bothered. That's what we have the Germans for." (from the song "Venner, Lad Værktøjet ligge"/"Friends, Leave the Tools Be")

== See also ==
- List of frivolous parties
