= Jacob Haugaard =

Danish-Faroese comedian

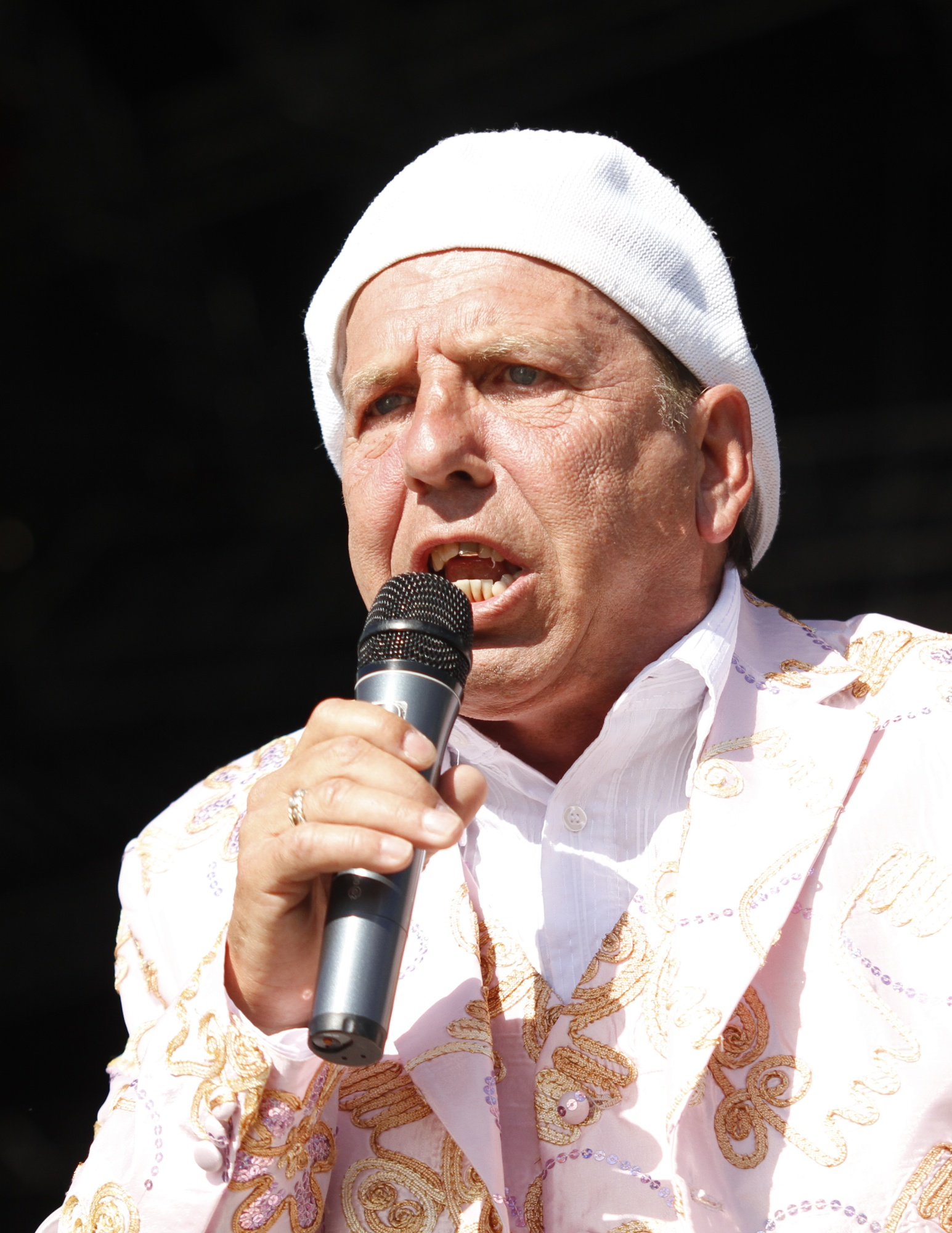
- Jacob Haugaard as the compère at Grøn Koncert, 2010.

Member of the Folketing
- In office September 21, 1994 – March 11, 1998

Personal details
- Born: Daniel Jacob Haugaard; 12 May 1952 (age 73) Tvøroyri, Faroe Islands
- Party: Independent; SABAE
- Occupation: comedian actor musician composer writer TV host politician
- Website: Jacob Haugaards Hjemmeside

Daniel Jacob Haugaard (born 12 May 1952) is a Danish-Faroese comedian, actor, musician, composer, writer, TV host and former representative in the Danish Parliament.

== Activities ==
Jacob Haugaard has been a well-known performer in Denmark for many years, mixing comedy, singing and instrumental music in his own unique style. He is usually dressed in an ever-changing range of gaudy suits, and often plays a home-made guitar for which he is well known. He has recorded many music records and CDs since 1977. Haugaard has also produced radio, films and TV, mostly comedy and sketches and has a long history of close cooperation with comedian and entertainer Finn Nørbygaard, since 1984. They performed as the Finn & Jacob duo for many years. Haugaard lived in Malling near Aarhus for many years, where he ran his own TV station from a disused watertower in his backyard, until he was elected as an MP.

In his younger days, Haugaard was a leader in the "Union of Deliberate Work-avoiding Elements" (Danish abbreviation SABAE), SABAE was a frivolous political party whose membership included numerous academics and journalists. The organisation was meant partially as a joke, but with a critical edge towards the modern capitalist society, and especially the labour market. They found inspiration in both Marxist and anarchist theories. SABAE's best known slogan was "if work is healthy, give it to the sick!".

Haugaard ran for every parliamentary election as a joke from 1979 onwards, until he unexpectedly won a seat in the 1994 general election representing the area around Aarhus. Running as an independent (though representing SABAE), he attracted 23,253 votes, enough to become one of the local members for the Aarhus area in the Parliament of Denmark from 1994–98. After his term expired, he decided not to seek re-election. Among his pointedly absurd campaign promises were: 8 hours of free time, 8 hours of rest and 8 hours of sleep; more tailwind on bicycle paths; promises of better weather; right to impotency; Nutella in field rations (which was actually implemented); and shorter queues in supermarkets. Asylum rated his win in the parliamentary election the 11th greatest prank of all time. When his portrait was hung in the parliament, Haugaard commented that it should serve as a warning that any idiotic populist might get elected.
