= 1994 Danish general election =

- 21 September 1994
- All 179 seats in the Folketing; 90 seats needed for a majority
- Turnout: 84.25%
Party	Leader	Vote %	Seats	+/–
Social Democrats	Poul Nyrup Rasmussen	34.56	62	−7
Venstre	Uffe Ellemann-Jensen	23.30	42	+13
Conservatives	Hans Engell	15.02	27	−3
SF	Holger K. Nielsen	7.28	13	−2
Progress	Pia Kjærsgaard	6.43	11	−1
Social Liberals	Marianne Jelved	4.59	8	+1
Red–Green	Collective leadership	3.15	6	+6
Centre Democrats	Mimi Jakobsen	2.84	5	−4
Independents	Jacob Haugaard	0.98	1	+1
Elected in the Faroe Islands
Union	Edmund Joensen	22.45	1	+1
People's	Anfinn Kallsberg	21.69	1	0
Elected in Greenland
Atassut	Daniel Skifte	34.73	1	0
Independents	–	57.83	1	+1
This lists parties that won seats. See the complete results below.

Government before	Government after election
Nyrup Rasmussen I S–CD–R–KrF	Nyrup Rasmussen II; S–R–CD

General elections were held in Denmark on 21 September 1994. The coalition of the Social Democratic Party, the Danish Social Liberal Party and the Centre Democrats led by Poul Nyrup Rasmussen remained in power despite the Christian People's Party, which had been part of the government, failing to cross the 2% threshold and losing all four seats. Voter turnout was 84.3% in Denmark proper, 62.3% in the Faroe Islands and 56.7% in Greenland.

== Results ==
The sole elected independent MP in Denmark proper was Jacob Haugaard, who was associated with the Union of Conscientiously Work-Shy Elements. As of 2023, this is the only time an independent candidate has been elected to parliament under the current constitution. The re-election of the prime minister was also notable for being a rare example of Condorcet paradox observed on a country scale, discovered through prior opinion polls.

Party	Votes	%	Seats	+/–
Denmark proper
Social Democrats	1,150,048	34.56	62	–7
Venstre	775,176	23.30	42	+13
Conservative People's Party	499,845	15.02	27	–3
Socialist People's Party	242,398	7.28	13	–2
Progress Party	214,057	6.43	11	–1
Danish Social Liberal Party	152,701	4.59	8	+1
Red–Green Alliance	104,701	3.15	6	+6
Centre Democrats	94,496	2.84	5	–4
Christian People's Party	61,507	1.85	0	–4
Independents	32,668	0.98	1	+1
Total	3,327,597	100.00	175	0
Valid votes	3,327,597	99.02		
Invalid/blank votes	33,040	0.98		
Total votes	3,360,637	100.00		
Registered voters/turnout	3,988,787	84.25		
Faroe Islands
Union Party	4,304	22.45	1	+1
People's Party	4,159	21.69	1	0
Social Democratic Party	3,729	19.45	0	–1
Workers' Union	3,118	16.26	0	New
Republican Party	1,798	9.38	0	0
Self-Government	469	2.45	0	0
Christian People's Party	467	2.44	0	0
Independents	1,131	5.90	0	New
Total	19,175	100.00	2	0
Valid votes	19,175	99.47		
Invalid/blank votes	103	0.53		
Total votes	19,278	100.00		
Registered voters/turnout	30,949	62.29		
Greenland
Atassut	7,501	34.73	1	0
Centre Party	1,605	7.43	0	New
Independents	12,489	57.83	1	+1
Total	21,595	100.00	2	0
Valid votes	21,595	96.58		
Invalid/blank votes	765	3.42		
Total votes	22,360	100.00		
Registered voters/turnout	38,113	58.67		
Source: Nohlen & Stöver

== See also ==
- List of members of the Folketing, 1994–1998
