= List of 3D films (1914–2004) =

List of 3D films from 1914 to 2004

This is a list of 3D films released before 2005.

The tables can be sorted by clicking the arrow icons in the column headers. The abbreviations Po and Ps indicate single-strip over/under print and single-strip side-by-side print respectively.

== 1914–1952 films ==
Title	Release date	Prod. Country	System	Technology	Aspect Ratio	Runtime min	Notes
L'Arrivée d'un train en gare de La Ciotat	1935	France	Stereoscopic Lumière	Dual 35 mm		1	Shown anaglyphic
Nozze vagabonde	1936	Italy	Sistema Gaultiero Gaulterotti	Ps 70 mm	1.37:1	81	Filmed in 3D but unclear if screened in 3D, either polarized or anaglyph
Zum Greifen nah	1937	Germany	Raumfilm-System Zeiss-Ikon	Ps 35 mm	1.37:1	10	Advertisement short film for the German insurance company Volksfürsorge, filmed in 1936
Raumfilm	1939	Germany	Raumfilm-System Zeiss-Ikon	Ps vertical	1.66:1		Short film
6 Mädels rollen ins Wochenend: Eine Raumfilm-Studie von Zeiss-Ikon	1939	Germany	Raumfilm-System Zeiss-Ikon	Ps vertical	1.66:1	20	B&W test short film
Queen Juliana	1948	Netherlands	VeriVision	Ps vertical	1.33:1		
Sunshine Miners	1951	UK	Stereo Techniques	Dual 35 mm			
Around Is Around	1951	Canada, UK	Stereo Techniques	Dual 35 mm	1.37:1	10	
Audioscopiks	1935	United States	Norling-Leventhal 3-Dimensions	Dual 35 mm	1.37:1	8	Shown anaglyphic
Faust	1922	France		Dual 35 mm			Shown anaglyphic
Heartbound	1925	United States	Stereoscopic	Dual 35 mm	1.33:1		Shown anaglyphic
In Tune with Tomorrow	1939	United States	Loucks & Norling 3-Dimension	Dual 35 mm	1.37:1	15	Remade as New Dimensions.
Luna-cy!	1925	United States	Stereoscopiks	Dual 35 mm	1.33:1		Shown anaglyphic
Movies of the Future	1922	United States	Plasticon 3-D	Dual 35 mm	1.33:1		Also known as Plasticons. Was shown anaglyphic.
The New Audioscopiks	1938	United States	Norling-Leventhal 3-Dimensions	Dual 35 mm	1.37:1	8	Shown anaglyphic
New Dimensions	1940	United States	Loucks & Norling 3-Dimensions	Dual 35 mm		15	Re-issued in 1953 as Motor Rhythm
Niagara Falls	1914	United States	Porter-Waddell Stereoscopic Process	Dual 35 mm	1.33:1		Shown anaglyphic
Now Is the Time	1951	Canada	Stereo Techniques	Dual 35 mm	1.37:1	3	
Ouch!	1925	United States	Stereoscopiks	Dual 35 mm	1.33:1		Shown anaglyphic
Plastigrams	1922	United States	Plastigram 3-D	Dual 35 mm	1.33:1		Shown anaglyphic
The Power of Love	1922	United States	Fairhall-Elder 3-D	Dual 35 mm	1.33:1		Shown anaglyphic
M.A.R.S.	1922	United States	Teleview	Dual 35 mm	1.33:1	95	Also known as The Man from M.A.R.S. and Mars Calling. Shown in two-strip alternating frame 3D in 1922–23 at one theater only and later released in 2D under the title Radio Mania.
Rêve d'opium	1921	France	Stereo Parolini	Dual 35 mm			
Royal River	1951	UK	Stereo Techniques	Dual 35 mm			
A Runaway Taxi	1925	United States	Stereoscopiks	Dual 35 mm	1.33:1		Shown anaglyphic
The Ship of Souls	1925	United States	Miller Stereoscopic Process	Dual 35 mm	1.33:1		Shown anaglyphic
A Solid Explanation	1951	UK	Stereo Techniques	Dual 35 mm			
Third Dimensional Murder	1941	United States	Metroscopix	Dual 35 mm	1.37:1	8	Shown anaglyphic
Thrills for you	1940	United States	Loucks & Norling 3-Dimensions	Dual 35 mm	1.37:1	8	Shown at the San Francisco Golden Gate Exposition.
A Ziegfeld Midnight Frolic	1929	United States	Porter-Waddell Stereoscopic Process	Dual 35 mm	1.20:1	15	Only partially in 3D. Was shown anaglyphic.
Zowie	1925	United States	Stereoscopiks	Dual 35 mm	1.33:1		Shown anaglyphic
Day off in Moscow	1940	USSR	anaglyph	Dual 35 mm			OT: Выходной день в Москве, Vikhodnoy den` v Moskve
Leningrad Concert Hall	1943	USSR	Lenticular		1.37:1		OT: Кино-концерт в Ленинграде; Lenfilm;
Parade of Youth	1946	USSR	Polarization	Ps 35 mm	1.37:1		OT: Парад молодости; Sovcolor, Odessa
Robinzon Kruzo	1946	USSR		Ps 35 mm	0.67:1	85	OT: Робинзон Крузо; Sovcolor, Georgia
Crystals	1948	USSR	Stereofilm lenticular sequential		1.37:1		OT: Кристаллы
Karandash on Ice	1948	USSR	Lenticular		1.37:1		OT: Карандаш на льду; Karandash (Pencil) – is the name of a clown.
The days of wonderful impressions	1949	USSR		Ps	1.37:1		OT: Дни чудесных впечатлений; Dni chudesnykh vpechatleniy
The Car 22-12	1949	USSR	Lenticular		1.37:1		OT: Машина 22-12; Planar (2D) version – Happy trip (Счастливый рейс, Schastlivyy reys)
Happy trip	1949	USSR					OT: Счастливый рейс; Schastlivyy reys. Mosfilm
Land of Sun	1950	USSR		Ps	1.37:1		OT: Солнечный край
Masters of Sport	1950	USSR	Stereokino (frame sequential)	35 mm			OT: Мастер спорта
Pal	1950	USSR	Lenticular				OT: Пал
On the Steppe	1951	USSR	Lenticular	35 mm	1.37:1	44	OT: В степи; Sovcolor Gorkiy
Composition 4 (Stereoscopic Study No. 1)	1945	United States		Ps 16 mm	1.33:1	4	
Grand Canyon	1923	United States	Parker 3-D	Dual 35 mm		15	
Thru' the Trees: Washington D.C.	1922	United States	Plasticon 3-D	Dual 35 mm	1.33:1		
Stereo-Laffs	1941	United States		Dual 35 mm	1.37:1	15	Initially unscreened, but finally issued in 1953 under the title A Day in the Country.

== Feature films 1952–2004 ==
Title	Release date	Prod. Country	System	Technology	Aspect Ratio	Runtime min	Notes
The 3-D Army	1989	Taiwan	Unknown	Po 35 mm	2.39:1	93	Kung Fu children's film, original title 立體奇兵 Li ti qi bing
Abra Cadabra	1983	Australia	Triangle 3-D	Anaglyphic 35 mm	2.35:1	84	The first animated feature film in 3D.
Aabra Ka Daabra	2004	India	3-D Plus	Anaglyphic 35 mm	2.35:1	128	The first 3-D Plus film.
Adam and Six Eves	1962	United States	Natural Vision 3-Dimension	Dual 35 mm	1.85:1	60	Only partially in 3D, was released flat
Adventures in Animation 3D	May 18, 2004	Canada	IMAX 3D	Dual 70 mm	1.43:1	40	
America's Greatest Roller Coaster Thrills in 3D	1994	United States	Pulfrich 3-D	Video (NTSC)	1.33:1	66	
America's Greatest Roller Coaster Thrills 2 in 3D	1996	United States	Pulfrich 3-D	Video (NTSC)	1.33:1	67	
Amityville 3-D	1983	United States	ArriVision 3-D	Po 35 mm	2.35:1	105	
A*P*E	1976	South Korea	SpaceVision 3-D	Po 35 mm	2.35:1	87	
Arena	1953	United States	Metrovision Tri-Dee	Dual 35 mm	1.37:1	83	
Asylum of the Insane	1967	United States	HorrorScope	Anaglyphic 35 mm	1.85:1	83	Only parts of the film are in 3D
The Bellboy and the Playgirls	1962	United States, West Germany	Optovision	Dual 16 mm	1.66:1	94	Only partly in 3D. 2D scenes were shot on 35 mm. Shown in 35 mm and anaglyphic.
Black Lolita	1975	United States	DeepVision	Anaglyphic 35 mm	1.37:1	85	Also known as Wildcat Women
Hot Skin	1977	United States	DeepVision	Anaglyphic 35 mm	2.35:1	85	Also known as Blonde Emmanuelle in 3-D and The Disco Dolls in Hot Skin
The Bounty Hunter	1954	United States	WarnerVision	Dual 35 mm	1.85:1	79	Was released in 3D
The Bubble	1966	United States	SpaceVision 3-D	Po 35 mm	2.35:1	112	Also known as Fantastic Invasion of Planet Earth and The Zoo
Bwana Devil	1952	United States	Natural Vision 3-Dimension	Dual 35 mm	1.37:1	79	
Camp Blood	2000	United States	Nu-View	Video field sequential	1.33:1	73	
Camp Blood 2	2000	United States	Nu-View	Video field sequential	1.33:1	90	
The Capitol Hill Girls	1977	United States	LazerVision	Ps 35 mm	1.37:1	80	
Captain Milkshake	1970	United States	Cinedepth	Dual 35 mm	2.35:1	89	Was only partly shot in 3D. Was released in 2D.
Cat-Women of the Moon	1953	United States	Tru-Stereo	Dual 35 mm	1.85:1	64	
Cease Fire!	1953	United States	Paravision	Dual 35 mm	1.66:1	75	
Chain Gang	1984	United States	StereoVision	Po 35 mm	2.35:1	86	
The Chamber-Mades	1971	United States	Triarama	Ps anamorphic	1.33:1	70	
The Charge at Feather River	1953	United States	Natural Vision 3-Dimension	Dual 35 mm	1.37:1	95	
Comin' at Ya!	1981	Italy, Spain, United States	Optimax III	Po 35 mm	2.35:1	91	
Creature from the Black Lagoon	1954	United States	Universal 3-D	Dual 35 mm	2.00:1	79	
Dangerous Mission	1954	United States	Future Dimension	Dual 35 mm	1.75:1	75	
Devil's Canyon	1953	United States	Natural Vision 3-Dimension	Dual 35 mm	1.37:1	92	
Dial M for Murder	1954	United States	WarnerVision	Dual 35 mm	1.85:1	105	
The Diamond	1954	UK	Spacemaster 3-D	Dual 35 mm	1.66:1	83	Also known as The Diamond Wizard. Released in 2D. Shown only once in 3D, on September 13, 2006 in Hollywood.
Dinosaurs & Other Amazing Creatures	1995	United States	Pulfrich 3-D	Video	1.33:1	110	
Dogs of Hell	1982	United States	Future Dimensions	Po 35 mm	2.35:1	89	
Domo Arigato	1972	United States	SpaceVision 3-D	Po 35 mm	2.35:1	91	
Dragonfly Squadron	1954	United States	Monogram 3-D	Dual 35 mm	1.85:1	82	Was released in 2D
Drums of Tahiti	1954	United States	Columbia 3-D	Dual 35 mm	1.85:1	73	
Ecstasy '72	1971	United States	Optovision	Dual 16 mm			Only partly in 3D. Was shown in 35 mm Ps anamorphic 1.33:1.
Encounter in the Third Dimension	February 26, 1999	Belgium	Iwerks 3-D	Dual 70 mm	1.43:1	40	
The Flesh and Blood Show	1972	UK, United States	Spacemaster 3-D	Dual 35 mm	1.75:1	93	Only partially in 3D. Was released anaglyphic.
Flesh for Frankenstein	1973	United States, Italy, France	SpaceVision 3-D	Po 35 mm	2.35:1	95	Also known as Andy Warhol's Frankenstein
Flight to Tangier	1953	United States	Dynoptic 3-D	Dual 35 mm	1.66:1	90	
Fort Ti	1953	United States	Natural Vision 3-Dimension	Dual 35 mm	1.37:1	73	
Foxy Boxing	1983	United States		Dual Video	1.33:1		Was released anaglyphic
Freddy's Dead: The Final Nightmare	1991	United States	Freddy-Vision 3-D	Dual 35 mm	1.85:1	89	Only partially in 3D. Was shown anaglyphic.
The French Line	1953	United States	Future Dimension	Dual 35 mm	1.66:1	102	
Friday the 13th Part III	1982	United States	3-Depix	Po 35 mm	2.35:1	95	
Funk	1976	United States	Super Touch 3-D	Po 35 mm	2.35:1		
Ghosts of the Abyss	April 11, 2003	United States	Reality Camera System	Dual HD	1.78:1	59	Released in 35 mm anaglyphic, digital anaglyphic and dual 70 mm (IMAX).
Girls: Wet & Wild in 3D	1993	United States	Pulfrich 3-D	Video	1.33:1	79	Only partially in 3D. 2D segments were shot on 16 mm.
The Glass Web	1953	United States	Universal 3-D	Dual 35 mm	1.85:1	81	
Gog	1954	United States	Natural Vision 3-Dimension	Dual 35 mm	1.85:1	85	Was shown in Pola-Lite 3-D Ps vertical 1.66:1
Gorilla at Large	1954	United States	Clear-Vision	Dual 35 mm	1.66:1	83	Was also available in Pola-Lite 3-D Ps vertical 1.66:1
Gun Fury	1953	United States	Columbia 3-D	Dual 35 mm	1.85:1	83	
Hannah Lee: An American Primitive	1953	United States	Stereo-Cine	Dual 35 mm	1.37:1	75	Also known as Outlaw Territory
Heavy Equipment	1977	United States	3-Dimensions	Ps 16 mm	1.33:1		Shown anaglyphic
Hit the Road Running	1983	United States	Future Dimensions	Po 35 mm	2.35:1	89	
Hondo	1953	United States	WarnerVision	Dual 35 mm	1.85:1	83	
Hot Heir	1984	United States	Future Dimensions	Po 35 mm	2.35:1	90	Also known as The Great Balloon Chase
House of Wax	1953	United States	Natural Vision 3-Dimension	Dual 35 mm	1.37:1	90	
Hyperspace	1984	United States	StereoVision	Po 35 mm	2.35:1	90	
I, the Jury	1953	United States	StereoVision	Dual 35 mm	1.37:1	87	
I Was a Burlesque Queen	1953	United States		Dual 35 mm	1.37:1		Only partly in 3D. Was released anaglyphic.
Inferno	1953	United States	Clear-Vision	Dual 35 mm	1.37:1	83	
Supersonic Supergirls	1973	United States	StereoVision	Ps	0.67:1	92	Was shown Po 1.75:1
It Came from Outer Space	1953	United States	Universal 3-D	Dual 35 mm	1.37:1	81	
Jaws 3-D	1983	United States	ArriVision 3-D	Po 35 mm	2.35:1	99	
Jesse James vs. the Daltons	1954	United States	Columbia 3-D	Dual 35 mm	1.85:1	65	
Jivaro	1954	United States	Paravision	Dual 35 mm	1.66:1	92	Was released in 2D
Kiss Me Kate	1953	United States	Metrovision Tri-Dee	Dual 35 mm	1.75:1	109	
Hard Candy	1976	United States	DeepVision	Anaglyphic 35 mm	2.35:1	75	Also known as M 3-D! The Movie and The Lollipop Girls
Louisiana Territory	1953	United States	Future Dimension	Dual 35 mm	1.37:1	63	
The Mad Magician	1954	United States	Columbia 3-D	Dual 35 mm	1.85:1	72	
Magic Magic 3D	2003	India	StereoVision	Po 35 mm	2.35:1	103	
Maha Shaktimaan	1985	India	Arrivision	So 35 mm	2.40:1	110	
Man in the Dark	1953	United States	Columbia 3-D	Dual 35 mm	1.37:1	70	Originally released in sepia tone.
The Man Who Wasn't There	1983	United States	Optimax III	Po 35 mm	2.35:1	111	
Manhole	1978	United States	3-Depix	Po	2.00:1		
Mark Twain's America	1998	United States	IMAX 3D	Dual 70 mm	1.43:1	52	
The Mask	1961	Canada	Depth Dimension	Dual 35 mm	1.85:1	83	Only the dream sequences are in 3D. The film was shown anaglyphic.
The Maze	1953	United States	Monogram 3-D	Dual 35 mm	1.37:1	81	
Metalstorm: The Destruction of Jared-Syn	1983	United States	StereoVision	Po 35 mm	2.35:1	84	
Misadventures in 3D	2003	Belgium	nWave 3-D	Dual 70 mm	1.44:1	40	
Miss Sadie Thompson	1953	United States	Columbia 3-D	Dual 35 mm	1.85:1	91	
Money from Home	1953	United States	Dynoptic 3-D	Dual 35 mm	1.37:1	100	
The Moonlighter	1953	United States	Natural Vision 3-Dimension	Dual 35 mm	1.37:1	77	
Mud Madness	1983	United States				48	
My Dear Kuttichathan	1984	India	StereoVision	Po 35 mm	2.35:1	96	Is a 3D Malayalam film and the first 3-D film made in India. The movie was produced by Maliampurackal Appachan of Navodaya studio in Kerala.
The Nebraskan	1953	United States	Columbia 3-D	Dual 35 mm	1.85:1	68	
Paradisio	1961	UK	Tri-Optique	Dual 35 mm	1.66:1	76	The film is only partly in 3D. It was released anaglyphic.
Parasite	1982	United States	StereoVision	Po 35 mm	2.35:1	85	
Phantom of the Rue Morgue	1954	United States	WarnerVision	Dual 35 mm	1.85:1	83	
The Playmates in Deep Vision 3-D	1974	United States	DeepVision	Anaglyphic 35 mm	1.85:1		
The Polar Express	November 10, 2004	United States	Digital 3D	Dual 70 mm	2.00:1	100	
Pournami Raavil	1985	India	unknown	single strip 35 mm	2.40:1		Was released in Po 35 mm
Prison Girls	1972	United States	Optovision	Dual 16 mm	1.76:1		Was released in Po 35 mm
Ramrod	1973	United States	Stereo Prism	Ps anamorphic 16 mm	1.37:1		
Revenge of the Creature	1955	United States	Universal 3-D	Dual 35 mm	2.00:1	82	
Robot Monster	1953	United States	Tru-Stereo	Dual 35 mm	1.37:1	66	
Sangaree	1953	United States	Paravision	Dual 35 mm	1.37:1	94	
Second Chance	1953	United States	Future Dimension	Dual 35 mm	1.37:1	82	
September Storm	1960	United States	Natural Vision 3-Dimension	Dual 35 mm	2.35:1	99	
Sharks 3D	December 15, 2004	France, Bahamas, UK		Dual HD	1.78:1	42	
Shiva Ka Insaaf	1985	India	unknown	single strip 35 mm	2.35:1	135	
Saamri	1985	India	unknown	single strip 35 mm	2.35:1	106	
Silent Madness	1984	United States	ArriVision 3-D	Po 35 mm	2.35:1	93	
S.O.S. Planet	2002	USA, Belgium	nWave 3-D	Dual 70 mm	1.44:1	40	
Son of Sinbad	1955	United States	Future Dimension	Dual 35 mm	2.00:1	91	The film was released in 2D
Southwest Passage	1954	United States	Natural Vision 3-Dimension	Dual 35 mm	1.37:1	75	A single-strip 3D version was released in Ps vertical 1.66:1
Space Station 3D	April 19, 2002	Canada, USA	IMAX 3D-30	Ps 70 mm	1.44:1	47	Was shown in dual 70 mm
Spacehunter: Adventures in the Forbidden Zone	1983	Canada, USA	McNabb 3-D	Dual 35 mm	2.35:1	90	Was released in Po 2.35:1
Spy Kids 3-D: Game Over	July 25, 2003	United States	Reality Camera System	Dual HD	1.85:1	84	Only partially in 3D. was released anaglyphic
Starchaser: The Legend of Orin	1985	South Korea, USA		Po 35 mm	2.35:1	107	
The Starlets	1977	United States	Quadravision 4-D	Ps 35 mm	1.37:1	80	
Thanga Maamaa	1985	India	StereoVision	Po 35 mm	2.40:1	101	Action, fantasy and romance feature starring M. N. Nambiar and Sasikala
The Stewardesses	1969	United States	StereoVision	Ps anamorphic 35 mm	1.33:1	93	
The Stranger Wore a Gun	1953	United States	Columbia 3-D	35 mm	1.85:1	83	
Surfer Girls	1978	United States	StereoVision	Ps 35 mm	1.37:1		
Swingtail	1969	United States	Cosmovision	Anaglyphic 35 mm	1.85:1	65	
Tales of the Third Dimension	1984	United States	StereoVision	Po 35 mm	2.35:1	85	
Taza, Son of Cochise	1954	United States	Universal 3-D	Dual 35 mm	2.00:1	79	Was also released in PS vertical 2.00:1
Those Redheads from Seattle	1953	United States	Paravision	Dual 35 mm	1.66:1	90	
Four Dimensions of Greta	1972	UK	Spacemaster 3-D	Dual 35 mm	1.75:1	85	Only partly in 3D. Was released anaglyphic.
Tiger Man	1978	United States	Impact 3-D	Po 35 mm	2.35:1	85	
Top Banana	1954	United States	Natural Vision 3-Dimension	Dual 35 mm	1.37:1	100	Was released in 2-D
T-Rex: Back to the Cretaceous	October 23, 1998	United States	IMAX 3D	Dual 70 mm	1.44:1	45	
Willie Nelson's 4th of July Celebration	1979	United States	SpaceVision 3-D	Po 35 mm	2.35:1		Was released in 2D
Wings of Courage	1995	United States, France	IMAX 3D	Dual 70 mm	1.43:1	40	
Wings of the Hawk	1953	United States	Universal 3-D	Dual 35 mm	1.85:1	81	
Zombie Chronicles	2001	United States	Nu-View	Video field sequential	1.33:1	71	
Bugs!	July 25, 2003	UK	IMAX 3D	Dual 70 mm	1.44:1	40	
Across the Sea of Time	October 20, 1995	United States, Canada	IMAX 3D	Dual 70 mm	1.44:1	52	Also released in 8/70 prints with an aspect ratio of 1.35:1
The Hidden Dimension	May 9, 1997	Canada, USA	IMAX 3D	Dual 70 mm	1.44:1	45	
Siegfried & Roy: The Magic Box	1999	Canada, USA	IMAX 3D	Dual 70 mm	1.43:1	50	
Galapagos: The Enchanted Voyage	October 27, 1999	Canada, USA	Iwerks 3D	Dual 70 mm	1.34:1	40	Also released in IMAX 3D.
CyberWorld	October 6, 2000	Canada, USA	Digital 3D	Dual 70 mm	1.44:1	44	Contains sequences converted from 2D. Released in IMAX 3D.
Ocean Wonderland	February 11, 2003	UK, France		Dual HD	1.44:1	41	Also known as Blue Magic. Released in IMAX 3D.
NASCAR 3D: The IMAX Experience	March 12, 2004	Canada, USA	IMAX 3D	Dual 70 mm	1.43:1	40	
Emmanuelle 4	1984	France	ArriVision 3-D	Po 35 mm	2.35:1	90	Dubbed into several languages, including English. New scenes were shot for the US version in StereoVision 3-D.
Liebe in drei Dimensionen	1973	West Germany	Triarama	Ps anamorphic 70 mm	2.20:1	93	35 mm prints were Po 2.35:1. Dubbed into English and released as Love in 3-D.
Femmina	1953	Italy	Tridimensionale Christiani	Dual 35 mm		90	Also known as Tailor-Made Beauties, Bella su Misura, Beauty to Measure and Cavalieri Dell’Illusione.
Chhota Chetan	1998	India	StereoVision	Po 35 mm	2.35:1	90	Hindi-dubbed rerelease of My Dear Kuttichathan with additional footage.
Supergirls for Love	1983	West Germany	ArriVision 3-D	Po 35 mm	2.35:1	85	
The Gold Hunt	1953	Hong Kong	Kwong-Tzan 3-D	Dual 35 mm	1.37:1		Cantonese comedy feature film. Also known as The Fortune Hunters.
The North and South Chivalry	1977	Hong Kong	Hi Stereo Vision	Dual 35 mm	2.35:1		Martial arts drama feature
Le pensionnat des petites salopes	1982	France	StereoVision	Po 35 mm	2.35:1	66	
Perverted Criminal	1967	Japan			2.35:1		Adult film
Qian dao wan li zhu	1977	Taiwan, Hong Kong	Super Touch 3-D	Po 35 mm	2.35:1	94	The English title is Dynasty
El Reportero T.D.	1953	Mexico	Bolex Stereo	Ps 16 mm	0.67:1		Demonstration film
Shi shan nu ni	1977	Hong Kong	Optimax III	Po 35 mm	2.35:1	98	The US version is called Revenge of the Shogun Women
El tesoro de las cuatro coronas	1983	Spain, United States, Italy	3-Depix	Po 35 mm	2.35:1	97	Action-adventure feature, starring Ana Obregón
Un turco napoletano	1953	Italy	Richardson 3-D	Dual 35 mm	1.37:1	92	The English title is Neapolitan Turk
Ulisse	1954	Italy	Tridimensionale Christiani	Dual 35 mm	1.66:1	117	Seems the 3D system was abandoned before filming
El valor de vivir	1954	Mexico	Tercera Dimensión Bríceno	Dual 35 mm	1.37:1	105	Shown anaglyphic
Annai Bhoomi	1985	India			2.39:1	100	Tamil-language feature film
Magnificent Bodyguards	1978	Hong Kong	Ultra Vision	Dual 35 mm	2.35:1	101	Was released in Po 2.35:1
Cavalleria rusticana	1953	Italy	Tridimensionale Christiani	Dual 35 mm	1.37:1	80	
El corazón y la espada	1953	Mexico	Tercera Dimensión Bríceno	Dual 35 mm	1.37:1	80	Shown anaglyphic
Con la muerte a la espalda	1967	Spain, France, Italy	Hi-Fi Stereo 70	Po 70 mm	2.20:1	86	The English title is With Death on Your Back
La marca del hombre lobo	1968	Spain	Hi-Fi Stereo 70	Ps anamorphic 70 mm	2.20:1	88	Was shown in the US in Po 35 mm 2.00:1 as Frankenstein's Bloody Terror
Champagnegalopp	1975	Sweden	Wondavision	Ps vertical 35 mm	1.66:1	93	Also known under the English titles A Man with a Maid, Teenage Tickle Girls, The Groove Room and What the Swedish Butler Saw.
Aleko	1953	USSR	Stereokino, Lenticular	Single-strip 3-D	1.37:1	61	OT: Алеко
The White Poodle	1956	USSR	Stereokino	Ps 35 mm	1.37:1	70	OT: Белый пудель; Sovcolor, Odessa
The Creeps	1997	United States	StereoVision	Po 35 mm	2.35:1	80	Also known as Deformed Monsters
Man with the Green Gloves	1968	USSR	Stereo 70	Ps 70 mm	1.37:1	74	OT: Человек в зелёной перчатке; Chelovek v zelenoy perchatke
The Precious Gift	1956	USSR	Lenticular	Ps	1.37:1	80	OT: Драгоценный подарок; Dragotsennyy podarok Gorky Film Studio
Old thing	1958	USSR	Lenticular	35 mm	1.37:1	67	OT: Дружок; Druzhok; Gorky Film Studio, Druzhok — it's a dog name.
Sitting on the Golden Porch	1986	USSR	Stereo 70	Ps 70 mm	1.37:1	72	OT: На златом крыльце сидели; folk tale, Gorky Film Studio
No and Yes	1967	USSR	Stereo 70	Ps 70 mm	1.37:1	73	OT: Нет и да; Net i da
About the Strangeness of Love	1983	USSR	Stereo 70	Ps 70 mm	1.37:1	84	OT: О странностях любви; O strannostyakh lyubvi.Mosfilm
Kidnapping of the Century	1981	USSR	Stereo 70	Ps 70 mm	1.37:1	70	OT: Похищение века; Pokhishcheniye veka. Gorky Film Studio
SOS from the Taiga	1976	USSR	Stereo 70	Ps 70 mm	1.37:1	84	OT: S.O.S. над тайгой; SOS Nad Taygoy. Mosfilm
No More Jokes	1984	USSR	Stereo 70	Ps 70 mm	1.37:1	67	OT: Шутки в сторону; Shutki v storonu. Gorky Film Studio
The Mysterious Monk	1968	USSR	Stereo 70	Ps 70 mm	1.37:1	83	OT: Таинственный монах; Mosfilm
The Doctor's Pupil	1983	USSR	Stereo 70	Ps 70 mm	1.37:1	70	OT: Ученик лекаря; Uchenik lekarya. Gorky Film Studio
Locked in Glass	1978	USSR	Stereo 70	Ps 70 mm	1.37:1	98	OT: Замурованные в стекле; Zamurovannye v stekle. Mosfilm
She Has a Broom, He has a Black Hat	1987	USSR	Stereo 70	Ps 70 mm	1.37:1	85	OT: Она с метлой, он в чёрной шляпе; Ona s metloy, on v chyornoy shlyape; Gorky
A Bandy-Legged Friend	1959	USSR	Stereokino	Ps 35 mm	1.37:1	85	OT: Косолапый друг
Rider on a Golden Horse	1980	USSR	Stereo 70	Ps 70 mm	1.37:1	88	Also known as The Man on the Golden Horse. OT: Всадник на золотом коне; Mosfilm
The Lynx Stalks Its Prey	1994	Russia	Stereo 70	Ps 70 mm	1.37:1	80	Also known as The Tiger Goes on Trace. OT: Рысь идет по следу; Tsentrnauchfilm

== Short films 1950–2004 ==
Title	Release date	Prod. Country	System	Technology	Aspect Ratio	Runtime min	Notes
For the Birds	2000	USA			1.85:1	3	Released with Monsters, Inc. 3D
The Adventures of Sam Space	1961	USA			1.75:1	9	Released with September Storm 3D
Harmony Lane	1953	UK			1.33:1	28	Released with September Storm 3D
The Burbot	1953	USSR	Stereokino	Ps 35 mm	1.37:1	27	OT: Налим. Based on three Chekhov short stories.
Cyberheidi 3D	2002	Germany				15	
T2 3D: Battle Across Time	1996	United States		3 x Dual 70 mm			Theme park attraction
Plan 3-D from Outer Space	1985	United States	Digital 3D	Po	2.35:1	3	
Doom Town	1953	United States	Todd-Dunning 3-D	Dual 35 mm	1.37:1		Also known as Assignment A-Bomb
3D Jamboree	1956	United States	Natural Vision 3-Dimension	Dual 35 mm	1.37:1		Compilation Animated film Incl. Melody & Working for Peanuts
3-D on Parade	1981		StereoVision	Po	2.35:1		
3-Dynavision	1973			Dual 70 mm			Shown Po
Adolph Zukor Introduces Paravision	1953	United States	Paravision	Dual 35 mm	1.66:1		
Aerosmith	1983	United States		Po	2.35:1		
Air Junction	1953	United States	Stereo Techniques	Dual 35 mm			
Alien Adventure	August 17, 1999	Belgium	Iwerks 3-D	Dual 70 mm	1.44:1	35	
Bandit Island	1953	United States	StereoVision	Dual 35 mm	1.37:1	25	
Barge Dwellers	1978	United States	Lipton Three-Dimensional Filmmaking System	Dual Super 8			
Be Bop Bamboozled	1989	United States	Nuoptix			12	Was the half time show of Super Bowl XXIII
Bermuda Isle of Dreams	1953		Bolex Stereo	Ps 16 mm	0.67:1		
Boo Moon	1954	United States	Stereotoon	Dual 35 mm	1.85:1	6	Animated Short, Famous Studio. Released on 3-D Rarities.
Bullfighting in Spain	1953	UK	Stereo Techniques	Dual 35 mm			
Capstan Cigarettes	1953	UK	Stereo Techniques	Dual 35 mm			Advertising film for cigarettes
Captain EO	1986	United States	Kodak-Disney 3-D	Dual 70 mm	2.20:1	17	Theme park attraction
Carnival in April	1953	United States	Universal 3-D	Dual 35 mm	1.85:1	18	
Come Closer	1952	United States		Dual 16 mm			A non-narrative film featuring oscilloscopic light imagery
The Coronation of Queen Elizabeth	1953	UK	Dudley 3-D	Ps vertical	1.37:1		
A Day at the Del Mar Fair	1987	United States	Western 3-D	Ps vertical Super 8	1.66:1		
Dimensions in Time	1993	UK	Pulfrich 3-D	Video (PAL)	1.33:1	13	
Diet Coke Commercial	1989	United States	Nuoptix			1	Diet Coke commercial aired on January 22, 1989 during half-time of the Super Bowl XXIII
The Dimension of Oldsmobile Quality	1981	United States	StereoVision	Po	2.35:1		
Down the Hatch	1953	United States	Columbia 3-D	Dual 35 mm	1.85:1	17	
Escape from Beyond	1984		Wonder-Vision 3-D	Po	2.35:1		
Flying at Ya' Android Kikaider	1973	Japan		Dual 35 mm	2.35:1	33	Shown anaglyphic
Flying Carpet	1952	UK	Stereo Techniques	Dual 35 mm			
Forest	1978	United States	Lipton Three-Dimensional Filmmaking System	Dual Super 8			
Haunted Castle	February 23, 2001	Belgium, USA	Iwerks 3-D	Dual 70 mm	1.44:1	38	
Haunted House	2001	Belgium, USA				13	
Holsum Bread	1953	United States	Bolex Stereo	Ps 16 mm	0.67:1		
Honey, I Shrunk the Audience!	1994	United States	Kodak-Disney 3-D	Dual 70 mm	2.20:1	23	
How to walk	1983		Bolex Stereo	Ps 16 mm	0.67:1		
Hypnotic Hick	1953	United States	Walter Lantz 3-D	Dual 35 mm	1.85:1	6	Animated Short, Walter Lantz Studio – Woody Woodpecker. Released with Wings of the Hawk 3D
The III-D Olympiad	1986	United States	Elgeet Stereo	Ps 16 mm	0.67:1	6	
Imagine	1993	United States	IMAX 3D	Dual 70 mm	1.44:1	22	
It's Tough to be a Bug!	1998	United States		Dual 70 mm		9	
Muppet*Vision 3D	1991	United States		Dual 70 mm	2.20:1	20	Theme park attraction
London Tribute	1953	UK	Stereo Techniques	Dual 35 mm			
Lumber Jack-Rabbit	1954	United States	Burton 3-D	Dual 35 mm	1.37:1	7	Animated short, Looney Tunes
Magic Journeys	1982	United States	Kodak-Disney 3-D	Dual 70 mm	2.20:1	16	
Melody	1953	United States	Disney 3-D	Dual 35 mm	1.37:1	10	Animated short, Disney
Metroscopix	1953	United States	Metroscopix	Dual 35 mm			Shown anaglyphic – incl. Audioscopiks, The New Audioscopiks and Third Dimensional Murder
The Milwaukee Braves versus the Chicago Cubs	1953	United States	Bolex Stereo	Ps 16 mm	0.67:1		Baseball game footage of the Chicago Cubs playing the Milwaukee Braves at Wrigley Field on August 14, 1953
Nat 'King' Cole and Russ Morgan and His Orchestra	1953	United States	Universal 3-D	Dual 35 mm	1.37:1	18	Also known as Nat 'King' Cole Sings 'Pretend'
Nature Trail	1986	United States	Powell 3-D	Ps vertical Super 8	1.33:1	4	
Northern Towers	1952	UK	Stereo Techniques	Dual 35 mm			
O Canada	1952	Canada		Dual 35 mm	1.37:1	1	
On the Ball	1952	UK	Stereo Techniques	Dual 35 mm			
The Owl and the Pussycat	1952	UK	Stereo Techniques	Dual 35 mm	1.37:1	7	
Packaging... The Third Dimension	1953	United States	Bolex Stereo	Ps 16 mm	0.67:1		A promotional short for the Stone Container Plant
Paint Misbehavin'	1997	Canada	SANDDE	Dual 70 mm	1.44:1	2	
Pardon My Backfire	1953	United States	Columbia 3-D	Dual 35 mm	1.85:1	16	Released with The Mad Magician 3D
Popeye, the Ace of Space	1953	United States	Stereotoon	Dual 35 mm	1.66:1	7	Animated short, Famous Studio
Relieve Navarro	1992	Spain	StereoVision	Single strip 35 mm	1.40:1	20	Filmed for Universal Expo'92 in Seville
Rocky Marcianao vs. Jersey Joe Walcott	1953	United States	Stereo-Cine	Dual 35 mm	1.37:1	15	
Royal Review	1953	UK	Stereo Techniques	Dual 35 mm			
Scoring!	1984	United States	DeepVision	Anaglyphic 35 mm	1.85:1		
Sea Dream	1978	United States	SpaceVision 3-D	Po 35 mm	2.35:1	23	
Sears Sales	1953	United States	Bolex Stereo	Ps 16 mm	0.67:1		A training film for Sears
The Sensorium	1985	United States	ArriVision 3-D	Po 35 mm	2.35:1	14	
Shrek 4-D	2003	United States	Digital 3D	Dual 70 mm	2.20:1	12	
Space Journey	1985	United States	StereoVision	Po	2.35:1		
Space Patrol	1953	United States				30	One episode of the TV series was broadcast in 3-D on April 29, 1953.
SpongeBob SquarePants 4-D	2002	United States					Amusement park ride
Spooks!	1953	United States	Columbia 3-D	Dual 35 mm	1.85:1	16	Also known as Trails of Horror. Originally released in sepia tone. Released with The Mad Magician 3D
Spring has come to Helsinki	1953	Finland	Bolex Stereo	Ps 16 mm	0.67:1		Silent film
Tri-Opticon Stereo Techniques 3 Dimension (a.k.a. Royal Flush)	1952	United States	Stereo Techniques	Dual 35 mm	1.37:1	45	Collection of five shorts: Around Is Around, Black Swan, Royal River, Now Is the Time and A Solid Explanation
Summer Island	1953	UK	Stereo Techniques	Dual 35 mm			
This is Progress	1954	United States		Dual 16 mm			General Motors
Thorndyke, the Cactus Kid	1953	United States	Bolex Stereo	Ps 16 mm	0.67:1		Silent slapstick comedy film with intertitles
Through my Window	1978	United States	Lipton Three-Dimensional Filmmaking System	Dual Super 8			
Time for Beanie	1952	United States	Natural Vision 3-Dimension	Dual 35 mm	1.37:1		Prologue to Bwana Devil
Tournament of Roses Parade	1989	United States	Pulfrich 3-D				The 1989 parade was broadcast in 3-D on KTTV.
Transitions	1986	Canada	IMAX 3D	Dual 70 mm	1.44:1	21	The first IMAX film in 3-D
Triorama (a.k.a. This is Triorama)	1953		Bolex Stereo	Ps 16 mm	0.67:1	36	A collection of four shorts: American Life, Indian Summer (Recorded in Great Smoky Mountains National Park), Sunday in Stereo and This is Bolex Stereo
The Turning	1989		StereoVision	Po	2.35:1		
Twirligig	1952	Canada	Stereo Techniques	Dual 35 mm	1.37:1	3	
Venus	1984	France, USA	StereoVision	Po 35 mm	2.35:1		
Vintage '28	1953	UK	Stereo Techniques	Dual 35 mm			
Way Down West (1978 film)	1978	United States	Bolex Stereo	Ps 16 mm	0.67:1	3	
A Way of Thinking	1954		Ramsdell 3-D	Dual 16 mm			
We Are Born of Stars	1985	Japan	OMNIMAX 3D	Dual 70 mm	1.44:1	11	Shown anaglyphic
Wedges	1978	United States	Lipton Three-Dimensional Filmmaking System	Dual Super 8			
Weekend Panorama	1984	United States	Western 3-D	Ps vertical Super 8	1.66:1	5	Travelogue film shot in Southern California by Owen Western
Working for Peanuts	1953	United States	Disney 3-D	Dual 35 mm	1.37:1	7	Released with Walt Disney Treasures: Wave Eight The Chronological Donald, Volume Four
Zoo Snapshots	1953	UK	Bolex Stereo	Ps 16 mm	0.67:1		
Stereo Film	1952	United States		Dual 16 mm	1.37:1	1	
Ring up the Curtain	1954	UK	Stereo Techniques	Dual 35 mm			
College Capers	1953	United States	StereoVision	Dual 35 mm	1.37:1	16	
Santa vs. the Snowman 3D	November 1, 2002	United States	Digital 3D			32	
Echoes of the Sun	1990	Canada, Japan	IMAX 3D	Dual 70 mm	1.44:1	20	
The Last Buffalo	1990	Canada, United States	IMAX 3D	Dual 70 mm	1.44:1	27	
Into the Deep	March 11, 1994	Japan, USA, France, Canada	IMAX 3D	Dual 70 mm	1.44:1	35	
L5: First City in Space	October 11, 1996	USA, Canada	IMAX 3D	Dual 70 mm	1.44:1	35	
The IMAX Nutcracker	November 27, 1997	USA, Canada	IMAX 3D	Dual 70 mm	1.44:1	37	
Ultimate G's	February 17, 2000	Canada, Japan	IMAX 3D	Dual 70 mm	1.44:1	37	Also known as Ultimate G's: Zac's Flying Dream.
Cirque Du Soleil: Journey Of Man	May 5, 2000	Canada, USA	Iwerks 3D	Dual 70 mm	1.34:1	39	
Falling in Love Again	May 15, 2003	Canada	SANDDE	Dual 70 mm	1.44:1		
Állatkerti séta	1952	Hungary		Po	2.00:1		
Artista vizsga	1952	Hungary	Plasztikus Film	Po	2.00:1		
Denmark Live	1974	Denmark		Ps 35 mm	1.33:1		
Four-D	1953		Nord 3-D	Ps 16 mm	0.67:1		
Ketto	1953	Japan	Shochiku Natural Vision	Ps	1.33:1		
GEKIJÔ-BAN HONTÔ NI ATTA KOWAI HANASHI	1982	Japan	StereoVision	Ps	2.35:1		The anthology of horror stories contains a 3-D episode entitled Shisen featuring the young girl Risa Niigaka
Renault	1982	France	StereoVision 70	Ps anamorphic 70 mm	1.33:1		Advertisement film
Ritmo a tre (Rhythm in Three)	1953	Italy	Tridimensionale Christiani	Dual 35 mm			
Senneville	1983	France	StereoVision	Po	2.35:1		
Sportoló fiatalok (Sporting Youth)	1953	Hungary	Plasztikus Film	Po	2.00:1		
Stereo hiradó három	1954	Hungary	Plasztikus Film	Po	2.00:1		
Stereo hiradó kettö	1953	Hungary	Plasztikus Film	Po	2.00:1		
Szines szöttes	1954	Hungary	Plasztikus Film	Po	2.00:1		
Tobidashita nichiyobi	1953	Japan	Tovision	Dual 35 mm	1.37:1		
Téli rege	1953	Hungary	Plasztikus Film	Po	2.00:1		
Plastischer Wies'n-Bummel	1954	West Germany	Raumfilm-System Zeiss-Ikon	Ps vertical	1.66:1	10	Short film about the Oktoberfest
Der Wagen und sein Werk	1953	West Germany	Raumfilm-System Zeiss-Ikon	Ps vertical	1.66:1	5	Advertisement film about the production of Volkswagen Beetle
Plastische Vorstellung	1950	West Germany	Raumfilm-System Zeiss-Ikon	Ps vertical	1.66:1	5	Advertisement film about different models of Volkswagen Beetle
Weißer Traum	1950	West Germany	Raumfilm-System Zeiss-Ikon	Ps vertical	1.66:1	5	Advertisement film about a Volkswagen Beetle driving in the Alps. Also known as Der weiße Traum.
Stereo hiradó egy	1952	Hungary	Plasztikus Film	Po	2.00:1		
About Siberia with Love	1981	USSR	Stereo 70	side by side 65mm		20	OT: О Сибири с любовью
Baikal, oh the Beauty	1982	USSR	Stereo 70	side by side 65mm		30	OT: Байкал: красота какая
Fall Magic of Crimea	1973	USSR	Stereo 70	side by side 65mm		10	OT: Осенние этюды Крыма
Handshake With a Bear	1969	USSR	Lenticular	70 mm	1.37:1	30	OT: Вашу лапу медведь
Hello, Sochi	1975	USSR	Stereo 70	Side by side 65mm		10	OT: Здравствуй, Сочи!
May Nights	1953	USSR	Stereofilm lenticular				OT: Майская ночь, или утопленница; Gorky Film Studio
My Moldova	1982	USSR	Stereo 70	Side by side 65mm		10	OT: Моя Молдова
Unusual etudes	1963	USSR		Ps	1.37:1		OT: Необыкновенные этюды; Neobiknovennie etyudi
Parade of Attractions	1970	USSR	Stereo 70	Side by side 65mm		20	OT: Парад аттракционов
Pathways in the Park	1952	USSR	Lenticular		1.37:1		OT: В аллеях парка
Colored pebbles	1960	USSR		Ps	1.37:1		OT: Разноцветные камешки; Raznotsvetnie kameshki
Russian Sketches	1969	USSR		Ps 70 mm	1.37:1		OT: Русские этюды
The Souvenir	1977	USSR	Stereo 70	Ps 70 mm		10	OT: Сувенир; Suvenir
The Self-Assured Karandash	1955	USSR		Ps 70 mm	1.37:1	18	OT: Самоуверенный карандаш
The Spotted Foal	1981	USSR	Stereo 70	Side by side 65mm			OT: Жеребёнок в яблоках; Tallinnfilm
To Bulgaria in Winter	1981	USSR	Stereo 70	Side by side 65mm		20	OT: Зимой в Болгарию
The Evening in Moscow	1962	USSR	Lenticular 70 mm				OT: Вечер в Москве; Vecher v Moskve
When the Islands Come Alive	1982	USSR	Stereo 70	Side by side 65mm		30	OT: Когда оживают острова
Experiments in Love	1976	United States	Quadravision 4-D	Ps 35 mm	1.37:1	28	Available on 3-D Rarities II from Flicker Alley
Power in Perspective	1956	UK	Spacemaster 3-D	Dual 35 mm	1.66:1		
′Real Life′ Trailer	1979	United States	Dimension 3	Dual 35 mm	1.85:1		Shown anaglyphic.
Animal Play	1980	USSR	Stereo 70	Side by side 65mm	1.37:1	30	Also known as Baby Animals and Games of Animals. OT: Игры животныхIgry; zhivotnykh.
Bells	1980	USSR	Stereo 70	Ps 70 mm	1.37:1	10	Also known as Ten Bells. OT: Колокола.
The Magic Lake	1979	USSR	Stereo 70	Ps 70 mm	1.37:1	17	OT: Волшебное Озеро; stereoscopic puppet animation.
When Men are Singing	1980	USSR	Stereo 70	Ps 70 mm	1.37:1	20	OT: Когда поют мужчины.
Kamen Rider: Run All Over the World	1989	Japan				16	OT: 仮面ライダー 世界に駆ける. Part of the Kamen Rider franchise.
Kamen Rider World	1994	Japan				9	OT: 仮面ライダーワールド. Part of the Kamen Rider franchise; released with Super Sentai World and Toei Hero Big Gathering
Super Sentai World	1994	Japan				9	OT: スーパー戦隊 ワールド. Part of the Super Sentai franchise; released with Kamen Rider World and Toei Hero Big Gathering
Toei Hero Big Gathering	1994	Japan				5	OT: 東映ヒーロー大集合. Crossover between Metal Hero and Super Sentai franchises; released with Kamen Rider World and Super Sentai World

== See also ==
- 3D film
- List of 3D films
- List of 3D films (2005–present)
- List of computer-animated films
