= List of anamorphic format trade names =

There have been a great number of anamorphic format trade names, for reasons of prestige, technology, or vanity. The basic 35 mm anamorphic format originally popularized as CinemaScope has been known by a number of other monikers. In some cases, these names actually refer to different lens designs and technologies implemented; however, the great majority are simply re-branded lenses originally known by another name. In recent decades, it has generally been considered a cliché throwback, and thus the generic name of anamorphic format has become predominant.

All of the following trade names refer to the modern SMPTE-standard anamorphic 35 mm format or what was regarded as the standard at that time. Generically speaking, this means a 2× anamorphosis lens with 4-perf negative pulldown for both image origination and projection, and an aspect ratio of 2.35:1 until 1970 (requiring special, narrow "negative assembly" splices) and 2.39:1 after 1970 (using conventional "negative assembly" splices). The change from 2.35:1 to 2.39:1 (sometimes rounded to 2.4:1 or, mathematically incorrectly, to 2.40:1) was mainly intended to facilitate "negative assembly", and also to better hide "negative assembly" splices, which otherwise may appear as a slight "flash" at the upper edge of the frame, during a splice.

The term anamorphic should not be considered synonymous with widescreen; VistaVision was non-anamorphic, and at the time of shooting, so was Techniscope.

== Trade names ==
- /i Scope (from Cooke Anamorphic/i Lenses) (England)
- AgaScope (Sweden, Czechoslovakia and Hungary)
- Alexcope, also known as AlexScope (Argentina)
- Arriscope (Germany; developed by Arri)
- ArriVision (Germany; 3-D)
- Autentiscope (Spain)
- Camerascope (England)
- Cathayscope (Hong Kong)
- Cinepanoramic (France)
- CinemaScope (USA ["Bausch & Lomb formula" anamorphics, used for the fourth and all subsequent CinemaScope films]/France ["Chrétien formula" anamorphic, used for only the first three CinemaScope films]; pre-releases were 2.66:1, with separate 3-track sound, and 2.55:1, with composite 4-track sound, before standardization on 2.35:1; all general releases were 2.55:1, 1953 and later or 2.35:1, 1958 and later; the camera aperture remained 1.33:1/2.66:1; only the recommended projection aperture changed)
- Cinescope (Italy)
- Cineovision (Japan)
- Clairmont-Scope (USA)
- Colorscope (Italy; inconsistent usage across different formats, including anamorphic)
- Daieiscope (Japan)
- Dyaliscope (France)
- Elite Scope (Russia)
- Euroscope (France)
- Filmascope (Spain)
- Filmscope (Spain)
- Franscope (France and Czechoslovakia until 1959)
- Grandscope (Japan)
- Hammerscope (England)
- Hawk Scope (Germany)
- Hispanoscope a.k.a. Ifiscope (Spain)
- J-D-C Scope (England; developed by Joe Dunton)
- Kinoscope (Spain)
- Kowa Scope (Japan)
- Lomoscope (Russia)
- Magnoscope a.k.a. Cinescope (Spain)
- Master Scope (from Zeiss Master Anamorphic Lenses) (Germany)
- Megascope (England)
- Merdekascope (Malaysia)
- Naturama (USA)
- Nikkatsu Scope (Japan)
- Nipponscope (Japan)
- Optex-Scope (England)
- Panamorph (US)
- Panavision (US)
- Panoramic(a) (Italy)
- Perfimascope (Malaysia)
- Regalscope (US; 20th Century Fox's trade name for CinemaScope when used on black and white films)
- Rapiscope (Indonesia)
- Ruralscope (Made by Totalvision) (France)
- Scanoscope (several Hollywood productions in 1950s–60s were shot with this system, as the system was sold, not licensed; camera and optical printer lenses were made)
- Shawscope (Hong Kong; Shaw Brothers's trade name for CinemaScope)
- SIRUI Optical GmbH (Germany)
- Sovscope (USSR)
- Space-Vision (3-D)
- Spectrascope
- SuperCinescope (Italy)
- SuperTotalscope (Italy)
- Technirama (1956)
- Technovision (France)
- Todd-AO 35 (US)
- Toeiscope (Japan)
- TohoScope (Japan)
- Totalscope (Italy)
- Totalvision (France, Italy, East Germany)
- Ultrascope (West Germany)
- Vídeoscope (Spain)
- Vistarama
- WarnerScope (US; developed by Warner Bros.)
- Warwickscope (England)
