= Iscorama =

Series of anamorphic lenses for filmmakers

Iscorama was a trademark applied by ISCO Optics of Göttingen to a series of consumer-grade anamorphic lenses manufactured between the late 1960s and the beginning of the 21st century. These lenses were notable for their high optical quality and unique focusing characteristics, and with the advent of DSLR-based film making have attracted much interest from independent cinematographers and directors.

== History ==
ISCO had been producing anamorphic lenses since the 1950s, but the first Iscorama model was not introduced until 1968, [2] and was targeted at the wealthy amateur photographer who wished to create panoramic 35mm slide shows. This first lens was a two-section detachable monobloc unit, consisting of a 50mm f/2.8 taking lens, and a 1.5× horizontal stretch focusable anamorphic adapter.

The original Iscoramas were discontinued at the end of the 1970s, by which point in time ISCO had released the Cinegon C-Mount Cine lens, plus the Iscorama 36 and Iscorama 54 screw-in anamorphic adapters, and the associated Iscostat projection mount system. These new stand-alone adapters were a tacit acknowledgement of the fact that many ISCO customers were mounting the front element of the original Iscorama detachable monobloc onto other manufacturers' taking lenses.

1982 saw the addition of the Iscorama 42 to the range, and in the early 1990s, ISCO introduced a new series of sealed monobloc 50mm focal length anamorphic lenses, plus a pair of matching anamorphic projector lenses, all under the Iscorama brand. The sealed monobloc and projector lenses remained on sale until the end of the Iscorama era, although it appears that they never matched the sales figures of the original detachable monobloc Iscorama from the 1960s.

Because of steadily falling demand, ISCO took the decision to discontinue the entire Iscorama range in 2001.

== Models ==
Launched in 1968, this was a twin section detachable monobloc consisting of a fixed infinity focus f/2.8 50mm taking lens and a focusable anamorphic adapter that could be unscrewed from the taking lens. A standard 100mm projector lens was included in the Iscorama kit, and the anamorphic adapter could be attached to this, allowing the optically distorted images captured by the Iscorama monobloc to be projected in the correct aspect ratio.

The anamorphic section of the original Iscorama was the template for subsequent Iscorama adapters, all of which shared its 1.5× horizontal stretch ratio, patented focusing mechanism, and adjustable anamorphic alignment capability. The ISCO anamorphic focusing mechanism was unique in that the taking lens was simply set to infinity and then focus was adjusted using the anamorphic adapter alone. This was a major advance on competing manufacturers' designs, all of which required that focus was calibrated simultaneously on both the taking lens and the adapter.

The 1968 Iscorama was available in Exakta, Minolta SR, Nikon F, and Praktica M42 mounts and was the only Iscorama model to always feature an individual serial number on the front lock ring. They were shipped in blue and white packaging for the domestic German market, whilst export versions came in yellow and red boxes. None of this first generation of Iscoramas were multicoated.

These original Iscoramas are still amongst the most sought-after of all Iscoramas due to their flexibility - the assembled monobloc is an excellent 50mm lens for full frame DSLRs, whilst the adapter can be used with a large number of taking lenses on APS-C and Micro Four Thirds cameras without excessive vignetting occurring.

=== Iscorama Cinegon ===
The Iscorama Cinegon was an updated version of the original 1968 Iscorama, designed specifically for the Cine market. It comprised an f/1.8 10mm C-Mount taking lens, plus a detachable 1.5× stretch anamorphic adapter. This adapter appeared to be visually identical to the front section of the original Iscorama, but actually had a much larger 36mm diameter rear anamorphic element, which offered improved vignetting performance when the adapter was attached to third-party taking lenses. Like the original 1968 Iscorama, all Cinegons were single coated.

The Cinegon anamorphic adapter can be distinguished from the front section of the initial 1960s Iscorama by verifying the front lock ring inscription, which should read: ISCORAMA - CINEGON 1.8/10 - 1.5X

=== Iscorama 36 ===
The Iscorama 36 was a re-badged version of the Cinegon anamorphic adapter, and was available in both multicoated and non multicoated versions. There are unsubstantiated reports that ISCO produced a batch of Iscorama 36s with a 1.33x horizontal stretch ratio.

Iscorama 36s can be easily differentiated from the anamorphic adapter component of the original Iscorama by examining the text on the front lock ring - a true Iscorama 36 will have the following text silk-screened in this area: ISCORAMA - ANAMORPHOT 1,5× - 36.

=== Iscorama 54 ===
The metal-bodied Iscorama 54 was the next anamorphic adapter to be released by ISCO, and was the largest of all Iscoramas. Although it was a totally different physical design to the original Iscorama and the Iscorama 36/Cinegon, the optical and mechanical configuration was very similar, with all three lenses sharing an identical focus and anamorphic alignment mechanism. Because of its large rear anamorphic element, and wide diameter mounting thread (77mm), the 54 can be attached to a much wider range of taking lenses than other Iscoramas without vignetting occurring (although a 35mm focal length seems to be the limit on APS-C cameras). One of the downsides of the Iscorama 54's larger dimensions is the 95mm front filter thread, which has negative ramifications for the cost of filters and close-up lenses. Fortunately, it is possible to fix smaller (67mm and larger) filters within the recessed front opening of the lens without causing excessive vignetting.

The 54 was produced in five distinct versions:

- Non multicoated with metric focus scale, and metal focus and anamorphic adjustment grips.
- Multicoated with metric focus scale, and metal focus and anamorphic adjustment grips.
- Multicoated with metric and imperial focus scales, and metal focus and anamorphic adjustment grips.
- Multicoated with metric and imperial focus scales, rubber focus grip and metal anamorphic adjustment grip.
- Multicoated with metric and imperial focus scales, and rubber focus and anamorphic adjustment grips.

=== Iscorama 42 ===
The Iscorama 42 was introduced in 1982, and was essentially a mechanically upgraded, metal-bodied version of the Iscorama 36, with both lenses sharing very similar vignetting characteristics due to their closely related rear anamorphic element diameters. Unlike the Iscorama 36 and 54, the Iscorama 42 was only available as a multicoated lens.

The Iscorama 42 also had two other unique features.

The first was the inclusion of a small grub screw which could be adjusted to allow closer focusing. Unfortunately, the resultant image quality is very soft, and there are also extremely high levels of edge fringing, making the hack unsuitable for conventional video and still image capture. The second of the Iscorama 42ʼs unique features was its ratcheting anamorphic alignment mechanism, which was actuated by sliding the rubber grip section at the rear of the lens forward by two millimetres. This proved to be inferior to the lockable, free rotating mechanism on other Iscoramas; the ratchet indent spacing being too coarse to allow absolutely precise alignment of the anamorphic when screwed onto a taking lens. The most obvious side effect of this issue is the notable difficulty in achieving perfectly horizontal anamorphic lens flares with the Iscorama 42 when the adapter is attached directly to a taking lens.

=== Iscorama 1060 ===
This was a dedicated sealed anamorphic projection lens for use with standard 35mm slide projectors and was designed to complement the 2000 series sealed monobloc anamorphic lenses. The most interesting feature of the 1000 series projector lenses was their elegant anamorphic alignment mechanism. The 1060 was a multicoated lens.

=== Iscorama 1100 ===
Sealed anamorphic projection lens; almost identical to the Iscorama 1060, but with a longer focal length. Multicoated throughout.

=== Iscorama 2001 ===
The first of the early 1990s sealed anamorphic monobloc Iscoramas. These were the spiritual successors to the original Iscorama, but were much more limited in their range of possible applications due to their sealed construction and fixed anamorphic optics. Ironically, some of the 2000 series lenses were also optically inferior to their 1960s forebears.

Like all the lenses in this series, the Iscorama 2001 was a strange hybrid of ISCO anamorphic optical elements and components cannibalised from another manufacturer's prime lens. In order to keep these new monobloc anamorphics as compact and lightweight as possible, and to minimise vignetting effects, ISCO were obliged to craft them from 50mm prime lenses with relatively small diameter front lens elements. This ruled out the use of high-end, fast maximum aperture primes, and all but one of the 2000 series anamorphic were constructed from inexpensive, entry-level donor lenses; in this case, Nikon's F-mount 50mm f/1.8.

The 2001 was produced in both single-coated and multicoated versions, and along with the 2004, is the only 2000 series lens to sometimes feature a serial number on the front lock ring. These appear to be rather random, covering a range from 00002 to 73892.

=== Iscorama 2002 ===
Sealed anamorphic monobloc constructed using the cheapest of all Rollei 35mm SLR lenses, the Mamiya-built Rolleinar 50mm f/2. The camera mount interface was Rollei's QBM.

=== Iscorama 2003 ===
Sealed anamorphic monobloc based on Pentax’s venerable 50mm f/1.7 prime. The Iscorama 2003 was fitted with the Pentax K mount, and had fully multicoated optics.

=== Iscorama 2004 ===
The only sealed anamorphic monobloc manufactured from a premium quality prime, the donor lens being the Leica 50mm f/2 Summicron. The Iscorama 2004s were multicoated lenses, and featured a Leica R Mount camera fixing.

=== Iscorama 2005 ===
The last of the sealed anamorphic monoblocs, the 2005 was built out of the cheap I.O.R.-made second iteration of the Pentacon Prakticar 50mm f/2.4 pancake lens. The Iscorama 2005 was multicoated and had a Praktica B Mount.

== Related models ==
=== ISCO Centa Vision ===
The Centa Vision was the only 2× horizontal stretch anamorphic adapter with an Iscorama style form-factor that ISCO ever produced, and closely resembled the Iscorama 42 visually. ISCO-manufactured Centa Visions were always multicoated. Confusingly, ISCO also marketed a batch of re-branded Kowa Prominar 16-H lenses under the Centavision name. These were manufactured by Kowa in Japan, and were optically identical to the other versions of this lens (Kowa 8Z, Kowa for Bell & Howell, Elmoscope II), but differed physically in three respects: the ISCO version included a front filter thread (72mm), had a standard diameter rear mounting thread (49mm), and featured a dual unit metric/imperial focus scale. The Kowa-manufactured version of the Centavision utilised a standard anamorphic focus mechanism, rather than ISCO's patented system.

=== ISCO Wide-Screen 2000 ===
Marketed as a projection lens, the Wide-Screen 2000 was sold as an individual lens unit, complete with front and rear caps, but without a projector mount. All Wide-screen 2000 lenses were fully multicoated. The lens produced a 1.5× horizontal stretch.

=== Iscomorphot ===
ISCO manufactured an entire range of Iscomorphot anamorphic adapters for the 8mm and 16mm cine markets. These lenses were available in 1.5× and 2× horizontal stretch versions, and are distinct from true Iscoramas.

== Related products ==
=== Iscostat ===
This stand/adapter facilitated the use of Iscorama 36, 42 and 54 anamorphic lenses with standard slide and cine projectors.

== Optical characteristics ==
The Iscorama range of lenses offer higher levels of optical performance than comparable consumer-grade anamorphics. All models feature outstanding edge to edge sharpness, and demonstrate very low levels of chromatic aberration, although it is not certain whether or not the lenses are true achromats or apochromats. The only weakness in the Iscorama optical design appears to be the relatively high levels of complex cylindrical perspective distortion, which is most apparent when the adapters are attached to lenses with focal lengths shorter than 60mm. This deficiency is a notable shortcoming of the 2000 series sealed anamorphics, which suffer from significantly higher levels of cylindrical perspective distortion than the original 1960s Iscorama. Optical performance is remarkably consistent across the Iscorama range, and reports that the Iscorama 54's optical characteristics are significantly inferior to other Iscorama models are not accurate. Ironically, this confusion probably results from the superior flexibility of the Iscorama 54 design, which allows it to be attached to a wider range of lens classes than other Iscoramas. Some of these lens categories are optically incompatible with anamorphic adapters; a classic example being wide-angle primes, which create intrusive distortion effects when matched with an anamorphic adapter.

Like all focusing anamorphics, Iscoramas cannot focus on close subjects without the assistance of a diopter. This problem is easy to underestimate due to the imprecise focus scales on the Iscorama 36, 42, and 54 models. The focus scales on all these lenses indicate a minimum focus distance of 6 ft (just over 1.8m). However, when these adapters are attached to most standard 50mm focal length taking lenses, the measured minimum focus distance is 2.8m. Some of the 2000 series monobloc lenses, which are the combination of a third-party manufacturer's taking lens plus the optics from an Iscorama 36 (Iscorama 42 in the case of the Iscorama 2004), also have a minimum focus distance of approximately 3m.

== Problems ==
Iscoramas were bespoke, hand-made examples of optical engineering, and ISCO quality control never achieved the consistency of contemporaneous Japanese optics, with the result that Iscoramas can often display quality issues which are relatively rare in mass-produced lenses.

Problems include:

- Stiff or seized focus mechanism.
- Individual lens element separation.
- Excess cement along the interfaces between lens elements and lens barrel.
- Multicoating flaws.
- High levels of dust build-up within lens body.
- Oxidisation of internal and external painted/anodised surfaces.
- Splits, tears and de-lamination of rubber focus and anamorphic alignment ring grips.
- Cracks in the plastic focus scale ring on the original Iscorama, and the Iscorama 36/Cinegon.
- Loss of focus scale lettering on the original Iscorama and Iscorama 36/Cinegon.

== Servicing ==
ISCO used to offer a repair and service facility for Iscorama owners, but there are conflicting reports as to whether this resource is still available. There is, however, positive feedback from Iscorama owners who have had their lenses serviced at these repair centres:

- Nippon Photo Clinic Service, New York, USA
- Camserve, Hellingly, UK

== Later history ==
In August 2008 ISCO became a wholly owned subsidiary of Schneider-Kreuznach, and in September 2011 the firm was renamed 'ISK Optics GmbH'. They still produce anamorphic projector lenses and adapters for the Schneider group, including three models which are similar in appearance to the Iscorama 54:

- Schneider Cine-Digitar Anamorphic 1.33×
- ISCO III S, also sold as the Schneider Cine-Digitar Anamorphic 1.33× M
- ISCO III M, also sold as the Schneider Cine-Digitar Anamorphic 1.33× XL

The Cine-Digitar Anamorphic 1.33× is very close in size and weight to the Iscorama 54, but has a much larger rear anamorphic element than the Iscorama. Its street price is reasonable when compared to vintage Iscorama auction values. The other two lenses are on a totally different scale, weighing 2.1 kg and 4.1 kg respectively. There are no reports on whether these adapters are suitable for use with 35mm lenses and DSLRs.

== Alternatives ==
The following models are the closest analogues to the Iscorama range in respect to horizontal stretch factor (1.33x), and rear anamorphic element diameter:

- Letus 1.33x AnamorphX Anamorphic Lens Adapter.
- Century Precision Optics DS-1609-SB 16:9 Ratio Converter (non focusing).
- Century Precision Optics DS-WS13-SB 1.33x Full Zoom Anamorphic Converter (focusing).
- Optex OTDV58ANA 16:9 Ratio Converter.
- Panasonic AG-LA7200G Anamorphic Lens Adapter.
- Soligor 1.33x Anamorphic lens.

None of these lenses equal the Iscorama range optically, and all adapters other than the Letus AnamorphX suffer from relatively high levels of chromatic aberration . They do, nevertheless, offer superior vignetting performance thanks to their large rear anamorphic elements and pancake designs.

== Specifications ==
Model	Mount	Horizontal Stretch Factor	Focal Length	Maximum Aperture	Stated Minimum Focus Distance	Rear Anamorphic Element Diameter	Front Filter Thread	Weight
Iscorama	Exakta & 49mm Screw Thread	1.5×	50mm	f/2.8	2m	30mm	72mm	590g
Iscorama	Minolta SR & 49mm Screw Thread	1.5×	50mm	f/2.8	2m	30mm	72mm	570g
Iscorama	Nikon F & 49mm Screw Thread	1.5×	50mm	f/2.8	2m	30mm	72mm	570g
Iscorama	Praktica M42 & 49mm Screw Thread	1.5×	50mm	f/2.8	2m	30mm	72mm	570g
Iscorama Cinegon	C-Mount & 49mm Screw Thread	1.5×	10mm	f/1.8	2m	43mm	72mm	No Data
Iscorama 36	49mm Screw Thread	1.5×	NA	NA	2m	36mm	72mm	400g
Iscorama 42	62mm Screw Thread	1.5×	NA	NA	2m	42mm	82mm	750g
Iscorama 54	77mm Screw Thread	1.5×	NA	NA	2m	54mm	95mm	1000g
Iscorama 1060	52mm Projector Tube	1.5×	60mm	NA	NA	NA	NA	480g
Iscorama 1100	52mm Projector Tube	1.5×	100mm	NA	NA	NA	NA	480g
Iscorama 2001	Nikon F	1.5×	50mm	f/1.8	2m	NA	72mm	No Data
Iscorama 2002	Rollei QBM	1.5×	50mm	f/2.0	2m	NA	72mm	No Data
Iscorama 2003	Pentax K	1.5×	50mm	f/1.7	2m	NA	72mm	780g
Iscorama 2004	Leica R	1.5×	50mm	f/2.0	2m	NA	82mm	No Data
Iscorama 2005	Praktica B	1.5×	50mm	f/2.4	2m	NA	72mm	695g

== Iscorama bubble ==
With the advent of DSLR full HD video, a whole new generation of film makers began to explore the creative possibilities of wide-screen cinematography, and within a matter of months numerous online discussions had sprung up debating the relative merits of various anamorphic adapters, including the Iscorama range. It soon became apparent that Iscorama anamorphic lenses were an excellent match for HD DSLRs thanks to their outstanding optics and 1.5× horizontal stretch ratio, which transformed 16:9 video into a format very close to modern 2.39:1 Cinemascope. This renewed interest had a profound effect on their value and a textbook price bubble formed over a period of eighteen months, leading to price inflation of up to 2000 percent for some Iscorama models.

The retail price of Iscoramas had always been relatively high, and when last sold new at the beginning of the 21st century, the Iscorama 42 and 54 cost £734 and £1602 (including Value Added Tax) respectively in the UK. Within a few years they were worth a small fraction of that amount, and all 12 Iscorama models could be picked up at online auction for less than US$200 each. This extreme drop in value was due to the demise of the 35mm slide and 8/16mm cine markets, and to ISCO never having enjoyed the same collectible brand status as other West German optical manufacturers such as Leitz, Schneider Kreuznach and Zeiss.

The DSLR video revolution changed everything, and by late 2010 the more desirable models were fetching very large sums at auction, with two mint examples of the original 1960s Iscorama selling for record-setting prices of just over $4000. Six months later auction prices had fallen by 50 percent as classic supply and demand economics took hold - the high prices encouraged many existing Iscorama owners to put their lenses up for sale, with the result that Iscoramas became relatively commonplace on auction sites, and all models started to appear at regular intervals.

Final sale price auction data indicate that the Iscorama 54 and original 1960s Iscorama are the most valuable of the true DSLR compatible Iscoramas (the projector lenses are worth relatively little), whilst the 2000 series sealed monoblocs fetch the least at auction.
