= Totalvision =

French manufacturer of optical equipment

The Totalvision Company (French: La Société Totalvision) was a French corporation that specialized in the design and manufacturing of lenses, cameras, and projection systems primarily focused on anamorphic optics. It was founded in June 1954. Totalvision was created and managed by Georges Bonnerot and Elie Libman students of Professor Henri Chrétien. Circa 1956, the company experienced significant expansion to foreign markets. Totalvision cameras equipment and lenses were sold in East Germany (DDR), Yugoslavia, Czechoslovakia, China, Portugal, Spain, Italy, Romania, and Bulgaria.

Totalvision was a competitor of Cinemascope in Europe, providing cheaper licensing fees to European markets while presenting cinematographers with equipment of equal or better quality. The system comprised a wide range of anamorphic lenses, from 32mm to 150mm, that created little distortion and made CinemaScope almost obsolete in Europe.

== France ==
- Cinematographers such as: Claude Renoir, Louis Page, Lucien Joulin, Michel Kelber and Henri Alekan used Totalvision equipment for their work. All cameras were equipped with specifically designed couplings allowing a single primary and anamorphic focusing.
- Totalvision created an affordable 16mm anamorphic projection lens under the brand of Ruralscope which was marketed and sold to movie theaters in rural France.

== Italy ==
Polish-born director of photography/cinematographer Henryk Chroscicki bought rights to manufacture Totalvison's equipment in Italy and effectively became a rental house and a distributor for Italian filmmakers. More than 200 major films, including La Dolce Vita, and 300 documentaries have been shot with Totalvision equipment under the brand name of Totalscope. Based on his ownership of rights for Totalvision equipment, Henryk Chroscicki developed the anamorphic lens system Technovision which made its first appearance in 1974.

== Films Made with Totalvision ==
Name	Year	Director	Country
Move and I'll Shoot (Italian: Come te movi, te fulmino!)	1958	Mario Mattoli	Italy
Lui, lei e il nonno	1959	Anton Giulio Majano	Italy
First Spaceship on Venus (German: Der schweigende Stern)	1960	Kurt Maetzig	East Germany
Mother Courage and Her Children (German: Mutter Courage und ihre Kinder)	1961	Peter Palitzsch	East Germany
Die Liebe und der Co-Pilot	1961	Richard Groschopp	East Germany
A Monkey in Winter (French: Un singe en hiver)	1962	Henri Verneuil	France
Die schwarze Galeere	1962	Martin Hellberg	East Germany
The Flying Dutchman (German: Der fliegende Holländer)	1964	Joachim Herz	East Germany
Mir nach, Canaillen	1964	Ralf Kirsten	East Germany
Preludio 11	1964	Kurt Maetzig	East Germany
Schwarzer Samt	1964	Heinz Thiel	East Germany
Karla	1965	Herrmann Zschoche	East Germany
Hands of a Gunfighter (Italian: Ocaso de un pistolero)	1965	Rafael Romero Marchent	Italy
La longue marche	1966	Alexandre Astruc	France
The Sons of Great Bear (German: Die Söhne der großen Bärin)	1966	Josef Mach	East Germany
Frozen Flashes (German: Die gefrorenen Blitze)	1967	János Veiczi	East Germany
Frau Venus und ihr Teufel	1967	Ralf Kirsten	East Germany
Dr. Terror's Gallery of Horrors	1967	David L. Hewitt	USA
Encrucijada para una monja	1967	Julio Buchs	Spain
Mord am Montag	1968	Hans Kratzert	East Germany
Heißer Sommer	1968	Joachim Hasler	East Germany
Mit mir nicht, Madam!	1969	Roland Oehme	East Germany
Lesbo	1969	Edoardo Mulargia	Italy
Verdacht auf einen Toten	1969	Rainer Bär	East Germany
Im Himmel ist doch Jahrmarkt	1969	Rolf Losansky	East Germany
Netzwerk	1969	Ralf Kirsten	East Germany
Tödlicher Irrtum	1970	Konrad Petzold	East Germany
Tecumseh	1972	Hans Kratzert	East Germany

== See also ==
- Arriscope
- Aspect ratio
- Cine 160
- Letterbox
- List of film formats
- Pan and scan
- 21:9 aspect ratio
