= Sensorama =

Early virtual reality system

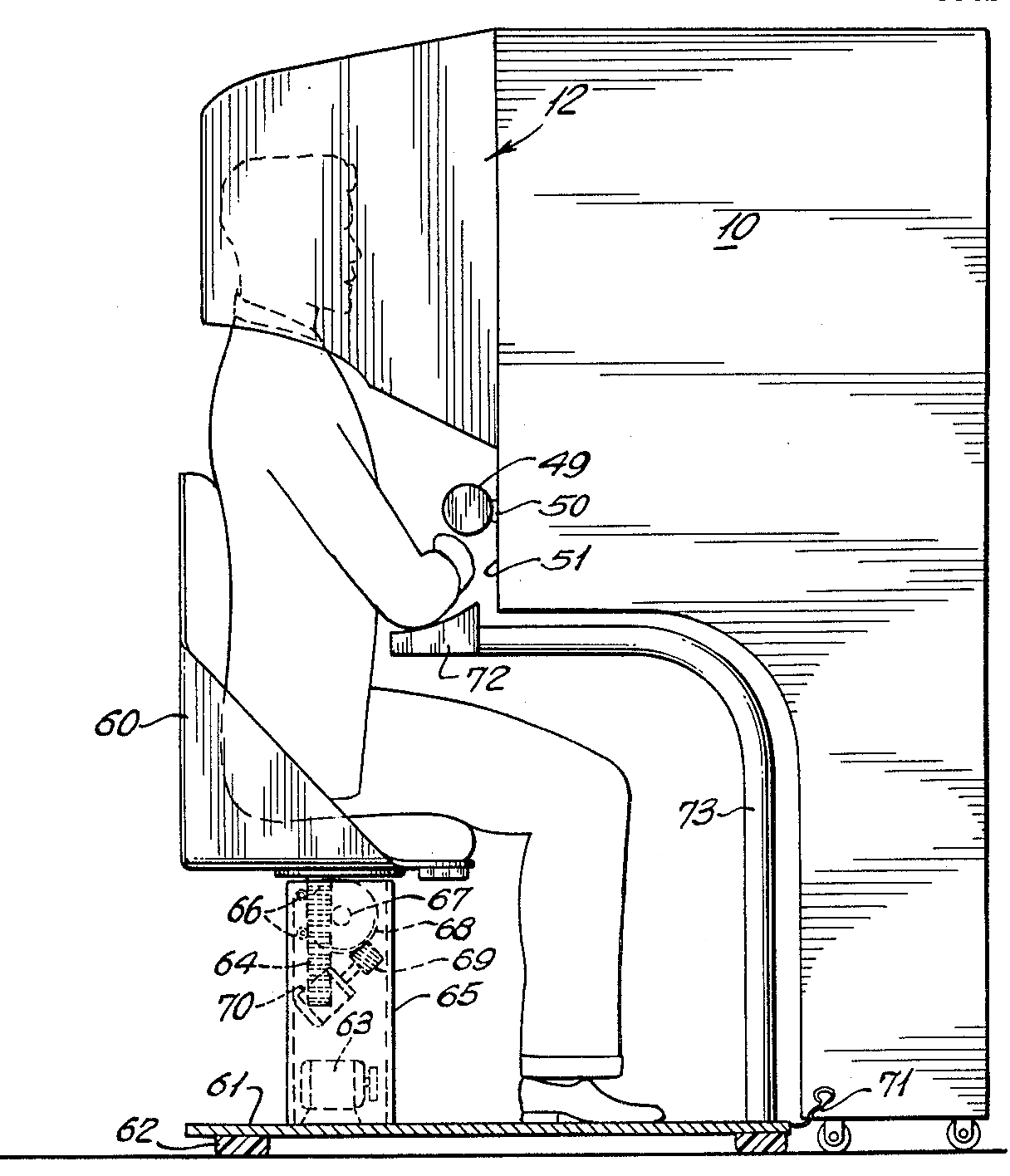
The Sensorama, from U.S. Patent #3050870

The Sensorama was a machine that is one of the earliest known examples of immersive, multi-sensory (now known as multimodal) technology. This technology, which was introduced in 1962 by Morton Heilig, is considered one of the earliest virtual reality (VR) systems.

== Development ==
Heilig, who would today be regarded of as a "multimedia" specialist, envisioned theater in the 1950s as an experience capable of engaging all the senses and drawing viewers more deeply into onscreen events. He called this concept "Experience Theater" and outlined his vision for multi-sensory theater in his 1955 paper "The Cinema of the Future" (Robinett 1994). In 1962, he built a prototype of this system, the Sensorama, and produced five short films for it.

The Sensorama was a mechanical device, which includes a stereoscopic color display, fans, odor emitters, stereo‐sound system, and a motional chair. It simulated a motorcycle ride through New York and created the experience by having the spectator sit in an imaginary motorcycle while experiencing the street through the screen, fan-generated wind, and the simulated noise and smell of the city. These elements are triggered at the appropriate time, such as the release of exhaust chemicals when the rider approached a bus. The petrol fumes and the smell of pizza snack bars were recreated by chemicals. While the machine still functions today, audiences cannot interact with it and it cannot respond based on the user's actions.

Howard Rheingold (in his 1991 book Virtual Reality) spoke of his trial of the Sensorama using a short film piece that detailed a bicycle ride through Brooklyn, created in the 1950s, and still seemed quite impressed by what it could do more than 40 years later. The Sensorama was able to display stereoscopic 3-D images in a wide-angle view, provide body tilting, supply stereo sound, and also had tracks for wind and aromas to be triggered during the film. Heilig was unable to obtain financial backing for his visions and patents, and so the Sensorama work was halted.

== See also ==
- The Sensorium, the world's first commercial "4D film"
