= The Sensorium =

Film

The Sensorium is regarded the world's first commercial 4D film and was first screened in a Six Flags theme park in Baltimore in 1984. It was produced in partnership with Landmark Entertainment.

== Description ==
The 4D film included multiple track discrete sound system, bodysonic seats and a series of scents released in sync with the film. The story told a series of American pastimes around the turn of the twentieth century and was narrated by the inventor Phineas Flagg - an imaginary turn-of-the-century explorer/scientist/raconteur (modeled after Phileas Fogg, Jules Verne's literary world traveler character in the novel Around The World in Eighty Days). The film used the ArriVision over/under 3D film system. The film was only shown at Six Flags Power Plant theme park.

== See also ==
- Sensorama, one of the earliest known prototype of an immersive, multi-sensory technology
