= Morton Heilig =

American virtual reality pioneer and filmmaker

Morton Leonard Heilig (December 22, 1926 – May 14, 1997) was an American pioneer in virtual reality (VR) technology and a filmmaker. He applied his cinematographer experience and with the help of his partner developed the Sensorama over several years from 1957, patenting it in 1962.

== Sensorama ==
The Sensorama is big, bulky, and shaped like a 1980s era video arcade game. It was impressive for 1960s technology. The viewing cabinet gave the viewer the experience of riding a motorcycle on the streets of Brooklyn. The viewer felt the wind on their face, the vibration of the motorcycle seat, a stereoscopic 3D view, and smells of the city.

Heilig wanted to create “cinema of the future.” The Sensorama was doomed, however, from the high costs of the filmmaking. The problem was not that the apparatus addressed the wrong senses; the business community just couldn't figure out how to sell it. He was not able to find the amount of funds necessary to create new 3-D films “obtained with three 35 mm cameras mounted on the cameraman.”

== Filmmaker ==
Heilig was the producer, director, writer, cinematographer and editor of the short films Assembly Line (1961), which was awarded the San Giorgio Medal at the Venice Film Festival, and Destination: Man (1965), as well as The Film Maker about the making of The Greatest Show on Earth. He was the producer, director, writer, cinematographer and editor of the feature film Once (1974). For the US Information Agency, he produced WIlson Riles (1972) about the superintendent of public instruction in the state of California and served as a cinematographer on The Entrepreneur: Malcolm Arbita. He also directed the TV series Diver Dan (1961). He was a production executive for the film They Shoot Horses Don't They? (1969).

Morton Heilig is buried at Eden Memorial Park Cemetery in Mission Hills, Los Angeles, California, USA.
