= Century Precision Optics =

Century Precision Optics is an American lens manufacturing firm. It was founded in 1948 in North Hollywood, California as Century Photo Optics. Steven Manios Sr. purchased the company in 1973 and created many of the optics. Century Optics makes a variety of digital, broadcast, projection, and industrial lenses. They have offices in Hauppauge, New York and Van Nuys, California.

The company received a Academy Award for Technical Achievement in 1991. Manios Sr. sold the company to Tinsley Laboratories in 1993. In 2000 it was then acquired by Schneider Optics, the U.S. subsidiary of the German firm Schneider Kreuznach. The Century name continues as a Schneider brand.

Manios Sr. died in January 2021 from COVID-19 at age 82.
