= Cylindrical perspective =

Form of optical distortion

Cylindrical perspective is a form of distortion caused by fisheye and panoramic lenses which reproduce straight horizontal lines above and below the lens axis level as curved while reproducing straight horizontal lines on the lens axis level as straight. This is also a common feature of wide-angle anamorphic lenses of less than 40mm focal length in cinematography, as well as the basis for creating the 146-degree peripheral vision of Cinerama when projected into a matching, cylindrically curved screen.

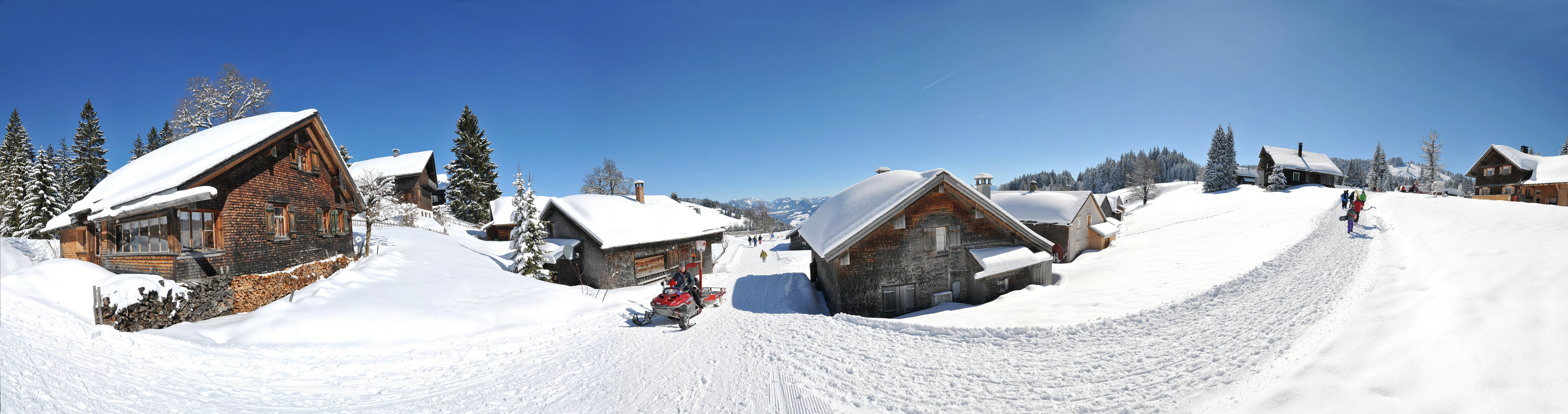
Panoramic view of Bödele near Dornbirn in Austria with a cylindrical distortion at the bottom.

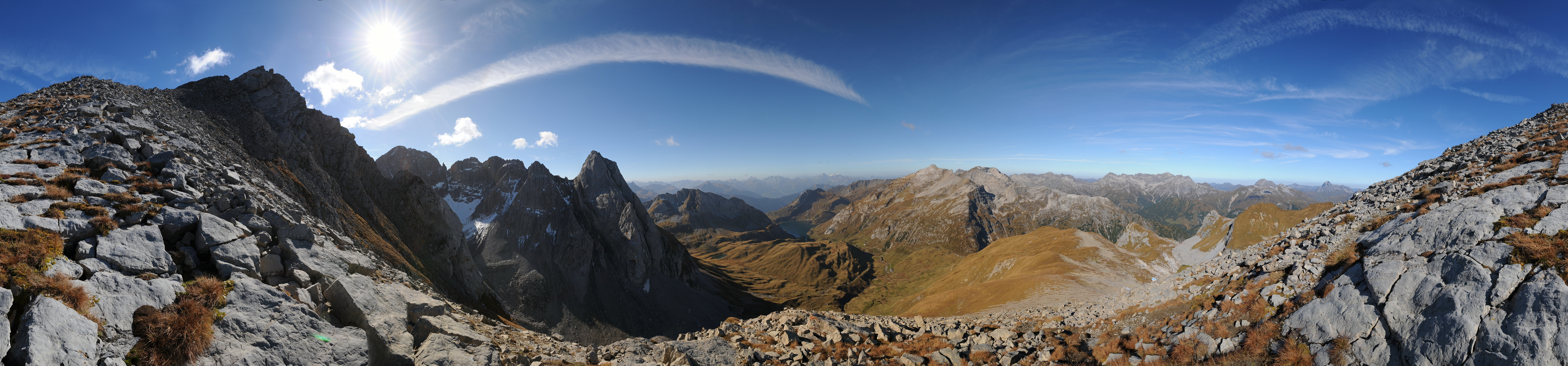
Panoramic view of the Lechquellen Mountains in Austria with a cylindrical distortion in the sky.

== See also ==
- Distortion (optics)
- Stretch-o-Vision
