= Louisiana Territory (film) =

1953 film directed by Harry W. Smith

- Directed by: Harry W. Smith; Peter Scoppa (assistant)
- Written by: Jerome Brondfield
- Produced by: Jay Bonafield; Douglas Travers
- Cinematography: Harry W. Smith
- Edited by: Milton Sherman
- Music by: George Bassman
- Production company: RKO-Pathé
- Distributed by: RKO Radio Pictures
- Release dates: October 14, 1953 (Premiere-New Orleans); October 16, 1953 (US)
- Running time: 65 minutes
- Country: United States
- Language: English

Louisiana Territory is a 1953 American historical drama film directed by Harry W. Smith (who also photographed the film), from an original screenplay by Jerome Brondfield. It opens with the circumstances of the sale of the Louisiana Territory by Napoleon's government and the roles of Robert Livingston and Charles Maurice de Talleyrand-Périgord. However, most of the film deals with the spirit of Livingston visiting major cities of the territory decades later in 1953.

Produced by RKO-Pathé, it was distributed by its sister company, RKO Radio Pictures, who premiered the film in New Orleans on October 14, 1953, with a national release two days later, on October 16. The film stars Val Winter as Livingston and Leo Zinser as Talleyrand. It also stars Julian Miester and Phyliss Massicot.
