= Anamorphic format =

Technique for recording widescreen images onto a 4:3 frame

Anamorphic lens
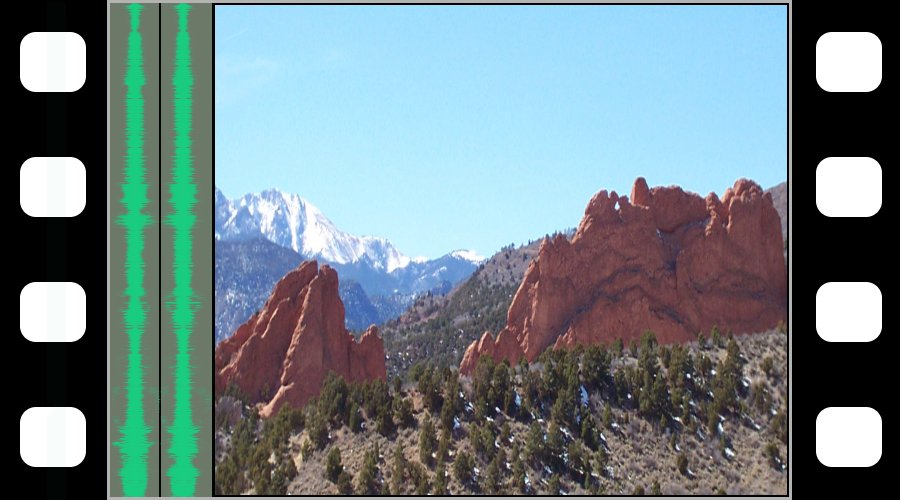
- Type: Optical technology
- Inventor: Henri Chrétien
- Inception: 1915
- Manufacturer: Bausch & Lomb; Panavision; Todd-AO; Cooke Optics; Carl Zeiss AG; Schneider Kreuznach; ISCO Precision Optics; Kowa; Technovision; Joe Dunton & Co. Vantage Film; JSC Optica-Elite; Atlas Lens Company

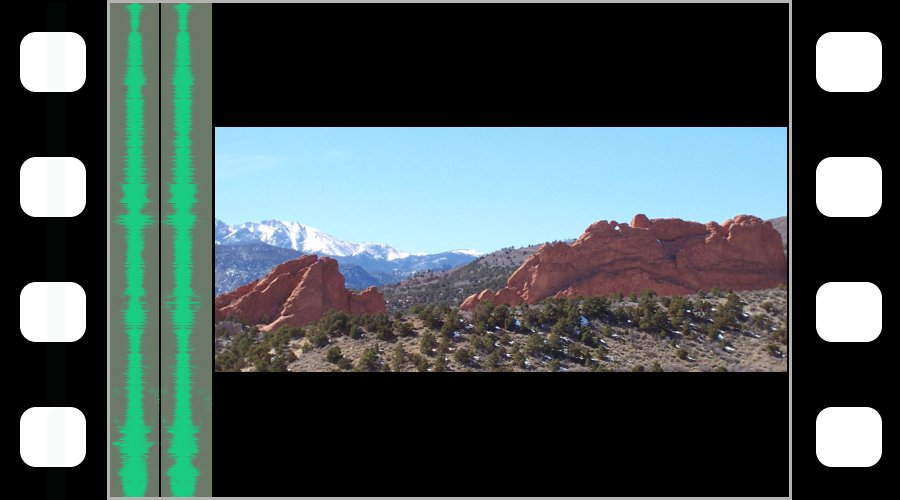
Figure 1. Shooting without an anamorphic lens, in widescreen picture format on 4-perf film; some of the upper and lower film surface area is wasted on the frame lines.

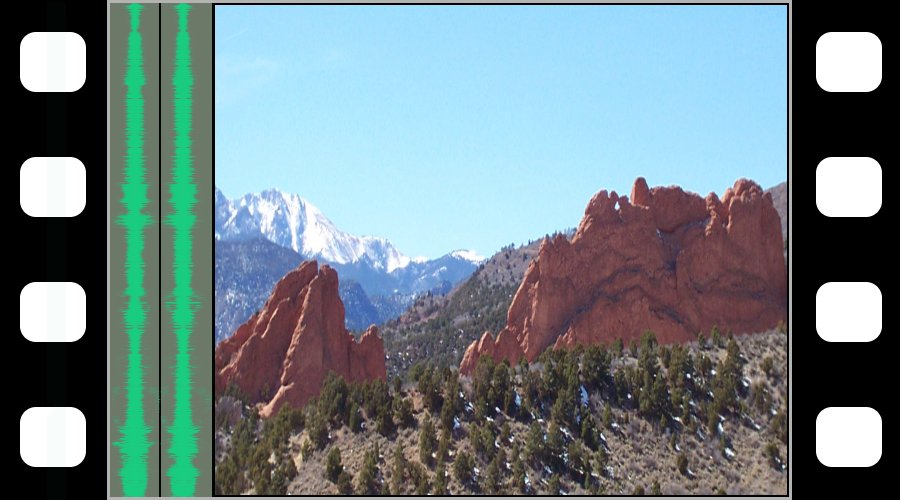
Figure 2. Shooting with an anamorphic lens squeezes the image horizontally by 2:1 to record a wide image on the more squarish film aperture, resulting in a higher resolution but distorted image. When projecting the film, a reverse, complementary lens (of the same anamorphic power) stretched the image horizontally to the original proportions.

Anamorphic format is a cinematography technique that captures widescreen images using recording media with narrower native aspect ratios. Originally developed for 35 mm film to create widescreen presentations without sacrificing image area, the technique has since been adapted to various film gauges, digital sensors, and video formats.

Rather than cropping or matting the image and discarding visual information, anamorphic capture employs cylindrical lenses to horizontally compress or "squeeze" the image during recording. A complementary lens is then used during projection to expand the image back to its intended widescreen proportions. By using the full height of the film frame or sensor, this method retains more image resolution than cropped non-anamorphic widescreen formats, and has an inherently wider horizontal field of view. Anamorphic lenses have more complex optics than standard spherical lenses which require more light, and can introduce distinctive distortions such as lens flares and oval shaped bokeh. However, these artifacts are sometimes deliberately embraced for their aesthetic appeal.

In the late 1990s and early 2000s, the use of anamorphic formats declined as advances in film stocks and processing techniques, followed by the advent of digital intermediates, made the lower resolution associated with matting flat spherical formats such as Super 35 less of a limitation. Many productions shifted to spherical lenses, which are simpler, lighter, cheaper and free from the optical distortions and artefacts characteristic of anamorphic optics. In the years that followed, the widespread adoption of digital cinema cameras and projectors contributed to a renewed interest in anamorphic formats, as digital sensors with higher base ISO sensitivity made filming in low light with anamorphic lenses easier.

The word anamorphic and its derivatives stem from the Greek anamorphoo ("to transform", or more precisely "to re-form") compound of morphé ("form, shape") with the prefix aná ("back, again"). Anamorphic format should not to be confused with anamorphic widescreen, a different video encoding concept that uses similar principles but different means.

== History ==
The process of anamorphosing optics was developed by Henri Chrétien during the First World War to provide a wide angle viewer for military tanks. The optical process was called Hypergonar by Chrétien and was capable of showing a field of view of 180 degrees. After the war, the technology was first used in a cinema in the short film To Build a Fire (based on the 1908 Jack London story of the same name) in 1927 by Claude Autant-Lara.

In the 1920s, phonograph and motion picture pioneer Leon F. Douglass also created special effects and anamorphic widescreen motion picture cameras. How this relates to the earlier French invention and later development, is unclear.

Anamorphic widescreen was not used again for cinematography until 1952 when Twentieth Century-Fox bought the rights to the technique to create its CinemaScope widescreen technique. CinemaScope was one of many widescreen formats developed in the 1950s to compete with the popularity of television and bring audiences back to the cinema. The Robe, which premiered in 1953, was the first feature film released that was filmed with an anamorphic lens.

=== Development ===
The introduction of anamorphic widescreen arose from a desire for wider aspect ratios that maximized image detail (compared to other widescreen formats, not compared to fullscreen) while retaining the use of standard (4 perf per frame) cameras and projectors. The modern anamorphic format has an aspect ratio of 2.39:1, meaning the (projected) picture's width is 2.39 times its height, (this is sometimes approximated to 2.4:1). The older Academy format of anamorphic widescreen was a response to a shortcoming in the non-anamorphic spherical (a.k.a. "flat") widescreen format. With a non-anamorphic lens, the picture is recorded onto the film negative such that its full width fits within the film's frame, but not its full height. A substantial part of the frame area is thereby wasted, being occupied (on the negative) by a portion of the image which is subsequently matted-out (i.e. masked, either on the print or in the projector) and so not projected, in order to create the widescreen image.

To increase image detail, by using all the area of the negative for only that portion of the image which will be projected, an anamorphic lens is used during photography to compress the image horizontally, thereby filling the full (4 perf) frame's area with the portion of the image that corresponds to the area projected in the non-anamorphic format. Up to the early 1960s, three methods of anamorphosing the image were used, counter-rotated prisms (e.g. Ultra Panavision) and cylindrical lenses (lenses curved, hence squeezing the image being photographed, in only one direction, as with a cylinder, e.g. the original CinemaScope system based on Henri Chrétien's design) curved mirrors in combination with the principle of total internal reflection (e.g. Technirama). Regardless of the method, the anamorphic lens projects a horizontally squeezed image on the film negative. This deliberate geometric distortion is then reversed on projection, resulting in a wider aspect ratio on the screen than that of the negative's frame.

==== Equipment ====
An anamorphic lens consists of a regular spherical lens, plus an anamorphic attachment (or an integrated lens element) that does the anamorphosing. The anamorphic element operates at infinite focal length, so that it has little or no effect on the focus of the primary lens it's mounted on but still anamorphoses (distorts) the optical field. A cameraman using an anamorphic attachment uses a spherical lens of a different focal length than they would use for Academy format (i.e. one sufficient to produce an image the full height of the frame and twice its width), and the anamorphic attachment squeezes the image (in the horizontal plane only) to half-width. Other anamorphic attachments existed (that were relatively rarely used) which would expand the image in the vertical dimension (e.g. in the early Technirama system mentioned above), so that (in the case of the common 2-times anamorphic lens) a frame twice as high as it might have been filled the available film area. In either case, since a larger film area recorded the same picture the image quality was improved.

The distortion (horizontal compression) introduced in the camera must be corrected when the film is projected, so another lens is used in the projection booth that restores the picture back to its correct proportions (or, in the case of the now obsolete Technirama system, squeezes the image vertically) to restore normal geometry. The picture is not manipulated in any way in the dimension that is perpendicular to the one anamorphosed. Using wider film for movies seemed easier, but 35 mm's widespread use made it more cost-effective to add special lenses to cameras and projectors rather than invest in a new format and equipment.

==== Naming ====
Cinerama was an earlier attempt to solve the problem of high-quality widescreen imaging, but anamorphic widescreen eventually proved more practical. Cinerama (which had an aspect ratio of 2.59:1) consisted of three simultaneously projected images side by side on the same screen. In practice the images never blended together perfectly at the edges. The system also suffered from various technical drawbacks, in that it required a film frame that was 6 perf in height, three cameras (eventually simplified to just one camera with three lenses and three streaming reels of film and the attendant machinery) and three projectors, which resulted in a host of synchronization problems. The format was popular enough with audiences to start the widescreen developments of the early 1950s. A few films were distributed in Cinerama format and shown in special theaters but anamorphic widescreen was more attractive to the Studios since it could realize a similar aspect ratio and without the disadvantages of Cinerama's complexities and costs.

The anamorphic widescreen format in use today is commonly called 'Scope' (a contraction of the early term CinemaScope), or 2.35:1 (the latter being a misnomer born of old habit; see Aspect ratio section below). Filmed in Panavision is a phrase contractually required for films shot using Panavision's anamorphic lenses. All of these phrases mean the same thing: the final print uses a 2:1 anamorphic projector lens that expands the image by exactly twice the amount horizontally as vertically. This format is essentially the same as that of CinemaScope, except for some technical developments, such as the ability to shoot closeups without any facial distortion. (CinemaScope films seldom used full facial closeups, because of a condition known as CinemaScope mumps, which distorted faces as they got closer to the camera.)

==== Optical characteristics ====
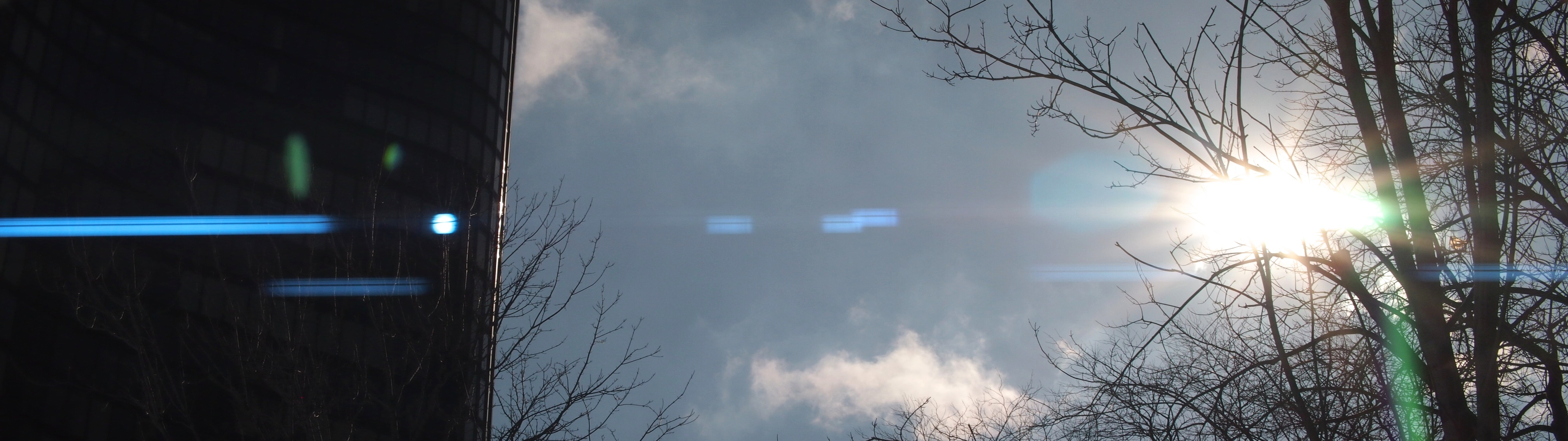
Example of blue-line horizontal anamorphic flare

There are artifacts that can occur when using an anamorphic camera lens that do not occur when using an ordinary spherical lens. One is a kind of lens flare that has a long horizontal line, usually with a blue tint, and is most often visible when there is a bright light in the frame, such as from car headlights, in an otherwise dark scene. This artifact is not always considered a problem, and even has become associated with a certain cinematic look, and often emulated using a special effect filter in scenes shot with a non-anamorphic lens. Another common aspect of anamorphic lenses is that light reflections within the lens are elliptical, rather than round as in ordinary cinematography. Additionally, wide-angle anamorphic lenses of less than 40 mm focal length produce a cylindrical perspective, which some directors and cinematographers, particularly Wes Anderson, use as a stylistic trademark.

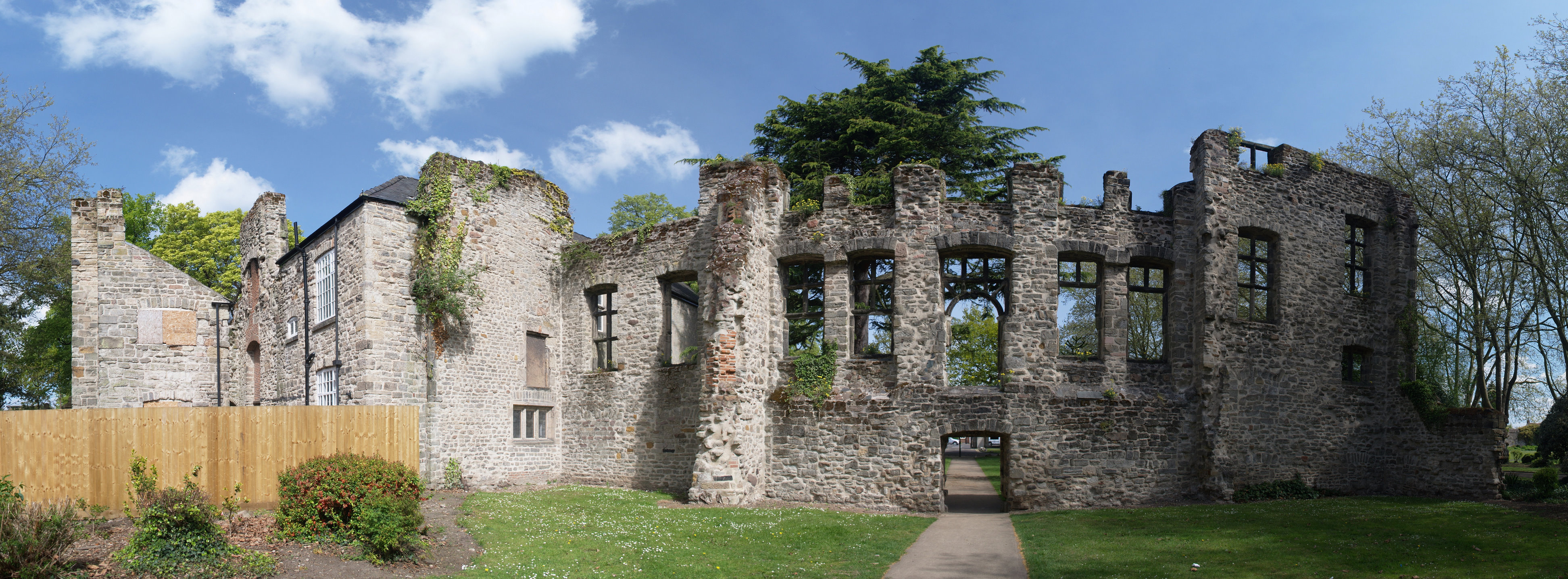
Many wide-angle anamorphic lenses render a cylindrical perspective, as simulated by this stitched panorama of Cavendish House, Leicester. Contrast the straight vertical plane with the curved horizontal plane.

Another characteristic of anamorphic lenses is that the cylindrical glass effectively creates two focal lengths within the lens. This results in out-of-focus points of light (called bokeh) appearing as vertical ovals rather than circles, as well as an increase in horizontal angle of view, both in proportion to the squeeze factor. A 50mm anamorphic lens with a 2x squeeze will have the horizontal view of a 25mm spherical lens, while maintaining the vertical view and depth of field of a 50mm. This has led to the common claim that anamorphic lenses have shallower focus, as the cinematographer must use a longer lens to obtain the same horizontal coverage.

A third characteristic, particularly of simple anamorphic add-on attachments, is "anamorphic mumps". For reasons of practical optics, the anamorphic squeeze is not uniform across the image field in any anamorphic system (whether cylindrical, prismatic or mirror-based). This variation results in some areas of the film image appearing more stretched than others. In the case of an actor's face, when positioned in the center of the screen faces look somewhat like they have the mumps, hence the name for the phenomenon. Conversely, at the edges of the screen actors in full-length view can become skinny-looking. In medium shots, if the actor walks across the screen from one side to the other, he will increase in apparent girth. Early CinemaScope presentations in particular (using Chrétien's off-the-shelf lenses) suffered from this. Panavision was the first company to produce an anti-mumps system in the late 1950s.

Panavision used a second lens (i.e. an add-on adapter) which was mechanically linked to the focus position of the primary lens. This changed the anamorphic ratio as the focus changed, resulting in the area of interest on-screen having a normal-looking geometry. Later cylindrical lens systems used, instead, two sets of anamorphic optics: one was a more robust "squeeze" system, which was coupled with a slight expansion sub-system. The expansion sub-system was counter-rotated in relation to the main squeeze system, all in mechanical interlinkage with the focus mechanism of the primary lens: this combination changed the anamorphic ratio and minimized the effect of anamorphic mumps in the area of interest in the frame. Although these techniques were regarded as a fix for anamorphic mumps, they were actually only a compromise. Cinematographers still had to frame scenes carefully to avoid the recognizable side-effects of the change in aspect ratio.

=== Recent use ===
Beginning in the 1990s, anamorphic began to lose popularity in favor of flat formats, mainly Super 35. (In Super 35, the film is shot flat, then matted, and optically printed as an anamorphic release print.) This was largely attributed to the artifacts, distortions, light requirements, and expenses (in comparison to its spherical counterpart), in the face of the rising use of digital visual effects. Moreover, with the advent of the digital intermediate in the 2000s, film grain became less of a concern with Super 35, as the optical intermediate/enlargement process could now be bypassed, eliminating two generations of potential quality loss (though an anamorphic negative, due to its size, still retained a higher definition widescreen image for mastering).

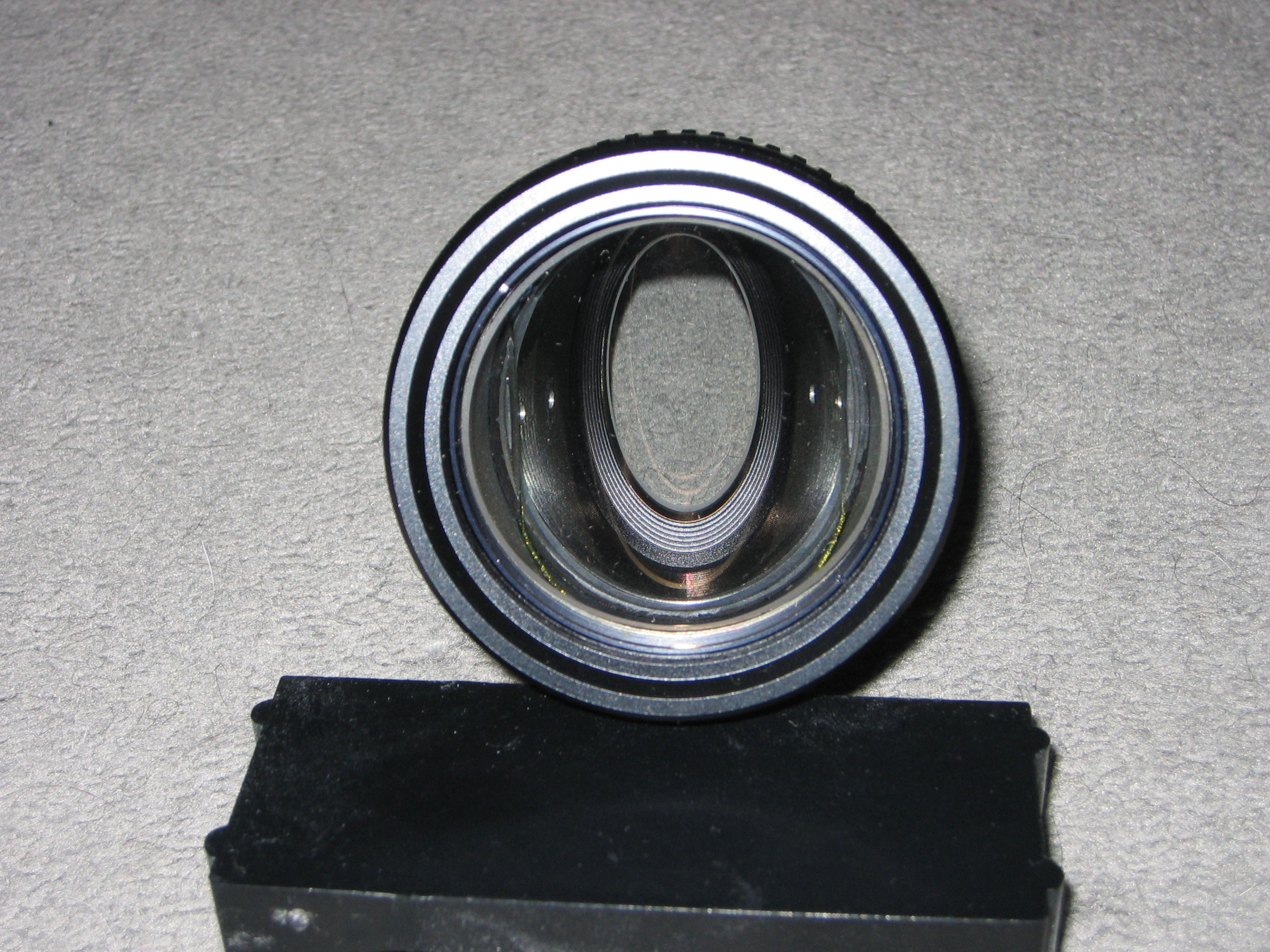
The aperture of the lens (the entrance pupil), as seen from the front, appears as an oval.

With the rise of digital cinematography, anamorphic photography has experienced a renaissance, as the higher light sensitivity (ISO) of digital sensors has lowered the lighting requirements that anamorphic lenses once demanded. Many vintage lens series, some of which saw little to no use for decades, have been sought by cinematographers wishing to add a more classic, film-like quality to digital cinematography; and manufacturers such as Panavision and Vantage have produced modern lenses using vintage glass for this purpose.

Emulation of anamorphic film has also been achieved in computer animation. One example of this is the animated series Star Wars: The Bad Batch by Lucasfilm Animation, which mimics the natural behavior of an anamorphic lens through simulated depth of field effects and a faux-film grain applied to the footage.

== Aspect ratio ==
One common misconception about the anamorphic format concerns the actual width number of the aspect ratio, as 2.35, 2.39 or 2.40. Since the anamorphic lenses in virtually all 35 mm anamorphic systems provide a 2:1 squeeze, one would logically conclude that a 1.375∶1 full academy gate would lead to a 2.75∶1 aspect ratio when used with anamorphic lenses. Due to differences in the camera gate aperture and projection aperture mask sizes for anamorphic films, however, the image dimensions used for anamorphic film vary from flat (spherical) counterparts. To complicate matters, the SMPTE standards for the format have varied over time; to further complicate things, pre-1957 prints took up the optical soundtrack space of the print (instead having magnetic sound on the sides), which made for a 2.55∶1 ratio (ANSI PH22.104-1957).

Anamorphic 4-perf camera aperture is slightly larger than projection aperture.

The initial SMPTE definition for anamorphic projection with an optical sound track down the side ANSI PH22.106-1957 was issued in December 1957. It standardized the projector aperture at 0.839 × 0.715 inches (21.31 × 18.16 mm), which gives an aspect ratio of c. 1.17∶1. The aspect ratio for this aperture, after a 2× unsqueeze, is 2.3468...∶1 (1678:715), which rounded to the commonly used value 2.35∶1.

A new definition issued in June 1971 as ANSI PH22.106-1971. It specified a slightly smaller vertical dimension of 0.700 inches (17.78 mm) for the projector aperture (and a nearly identical horizontal dimension of 0.838 inches (21.29 mm)), to help make splices less noticeable to film viewers. After unsqueezing, this would yield an aspect ratio of c. 2.397∶1. Four-perf anamorphic prints use more of the negative's available frame area than any other modern format, which leaves little room for splices. As a consequence, a bright line flashed onscreen when a splice was projected, and theater projectionists had been narrowing the vertical aperture to hide these flashes even before 1971. This new projector aperture size, 0.838 × 0.700 inches (21.29 × 17.78 mm), aspect ratio 1.1971...∶1, made for an un-squeezed ratio of about 2.39∶1 (43:18).

The most recent revision, SMPTE 195-1993, was released in August 1993. It slightly altered the dimensions so as to standardize a common projection aperture width (0.825 inches or 20.96 mm) for all formats, anamorphic (2.39∶1) and flat (1.85∶1). The projection aperture height was also reduced by 0.01 inches (0.25 mm) to give an aperture size of 0.825 × 0.690 inches (20.96 × 17.53 mm), and an aspect ratio of 1.1956...∶1, and thus retaining the un-squeezed ratio of about 2.39∶1. The camera's aperture remained the same (2.35∶1 or 2.55∶1 if before 1958), only the height of the "negative assembly" splices changed and, consequently, the height of the frame changed.

Anamorphic prints are still often called 'Scope' or 2.35 by projectionists, cinematographers, and others working in the field, if only by force of habit. 2.39 is in fact what they generally are referring to (unless discussing films using the process between 1958 and 1970), which is itself usually rounded up to 2.40 (implying a false precision as compared to 2.4). With the exception of certain specialist and archivist areas, generally 2.35, 2.39 and 2.40 mean the same to professionals, whether they themselves are even aware of the changes or not.

== Lens makers and corporate trademarks ==
There are numerous companies that are known for manufacturing anamorphic lenses. The following are the most well known in the film industry:

=== Origination ===
- Panavision is the most common source of anamorphic lenses, with lens series ranging from 20 mm to a 2,000 mm anamorphic telescope. These include:
  - B-Series (1965) - Panavision's second series of anamorphic lenses, these were restored and brought back into commission in 2013.
  - C-Series (1970s) - These are small and lightweight, which makes them very popular for steadicams. The 20 mm C-Series is Panavision's widest anamorphic lens, of which only two were ever made. The C-series remain popular among cinematographers for the broad pedigree of popular films they have captured.
  - Super High Speed (D-series) (1976) - Made with Nikon glass, these are the fastest anamorphic lenses available, with T-stops between 1.4 and 1.8; there is even one T1.1 50 mm, but, like all anamorphic lenses, they must be stopped-down for good performance because they are quite softly focused when wide open.
  - E-Series (1980s) - Made with Nikon glass, these are sharper than the C-Series and are better color-matched. They are also faster, but the minimum focus-distance of the shorter focal lengths is not as close. The E135mm, and especially the E180mm, are great close-up lenses with the closest minimum focus of any long Panavision anamorphic lenses.
  - Primo (F-series) (1989) - These are engineered with maximum aperture and optical quality in mind across all focal lengths, and as such are quite large and heavy by comparison to other series. They are the sharpest Panavision anamorphic lenses available, and are completely color-matched.
  - G-Series (2007) - These combine the optical quality of the Primo lenses with the size and weight of the C-Series.
  - T-Series (2016), Panavision's latest anamorphic lens series, designed for digital cameras initially, but also film camera compatible through specific re-engineering at Panavision. They are named for, and bear the signature of, Panavision's first lens engineer Takuo Miyagishima, and are based on many of his lens design ideas.
- Vantage Film, designers and manufacturers of Hawk lenses. The entire Hawk lens system consists of 50 different prime lenses and 5 zoom lenses, all of them specifically developed and optically computed by Vantage Film. Hawk lenses have their anamorphic element in the middle of the lens (not up front like Panavision), which makes them more flare-resistant. This design choice also means that if they do flare, one does not get the typical horizontal flares.
  - C-Series - developed in the mid-1990s, these are relatively small and lightweight.
  - V-Series (2001) and V-Plus Series (2006) - These improve upon the C-Series as far as sharpness, contrast, barrel-distortion and close-focus are concerned. This increased optical performance means a higher weight, however (each lens is around 4–5 kg [8.8–11.0 lb]). There are 14 lenses in this series—from 25 mm to 250 mm. The V-Series also have two macro lenses (65 mm and 120 mm) with a unique focusing mechanism enabling the closest minimum focus of any anamorphic lenses available.
  - V-Lite - 8 very small anamorphic lenses (about the size of a Cooke S4 spherical lens), which are ideal for handheld and Steadicam while also giving an optical performance comparable to the V-Series and V-Plus lenses.
  - Vintage 74 - Similar to the V-series, but incorporating vintage uncoated glass from a spherical lens set built in 1974. These lenses have a softer quality and enhanced flares.
  - V-Lite 1.3× (2008) - The V-Lite series with a 1.3x squeeze factor, enabling the use of nearly the entire image area of 3-perf 35 mm film or the sensor area of a 16:9 digital camera to provide the 2.39:1 release format.
  - V-Lite 16 (2008) - Lenses for 16 mm anamorphic production, in both 1.3x (for Super 16 mm) and 2x (for standard 16 mm).
- Carl Zeiss AG and ARRI developed their Master Anamorphic lens line, debuted in September 2012, to provide minimum distortion and faster aperture at T1.9. These are spherical lenses with the anamorphic element at the rear, as opposed to third-party modified Zeiss-based anamorphics such as JDC and Technovision.
- Cooke Optics also developed their Anamorphic/i lens line, providing T2.3 aperture and color-matched with other Cooke lens lines, which is marketed as their "Cooke Look" feature. Like Zeiss, it's a totally new lens design which is different from third-party modified Cooke-based anamorphics such as JDC and Technovision. Cooke also developed its Anamorphic/i Full Frame Plus in 1.8× squeeze ratio for full frame cameras.
- Lomo Lens Company :

Russian Manufacturer of synchro-anamorphic. Most famous for their vintage Round Front and square front lenses.

- White Point Optics:

Creator of Lomocrons, Lomo Square front elements joined with Leica R taking lenses.

- Kowa:

Japanese manufacturer of synchro-anamorphic lenses.

- Atlas Lens Company: Manufacturer of lower-cost anamorphic prime lenses. They currently produce two lines of lenses:
  - Orion Series - 2x anamorphic lenses for film and digital use, which cover the Super 35 mm format. The lineup currently consists of 12 lenses, ranging from 18 mm to 200 mm. They are designed to emulate Panavision's C-series. The 18mm and 21mm employ fisheye optics at the front of the lens.
  - Mercury Series - 1.5x anamorphic lenses for use with full-frame (VistaVision) sized sensors. The lineup currently consists of 7 lenses, ranging from 25 mm to 138 mm.
- Angenieux: Angenieux's first zoom for 35 mm film camera, the 35–140 mm, was equipped with a front anamorphic attachment built by Franscope. The 40-140 anamorphic was used on several Nouvelle Vague movies such Lola (1961) or Jules and Jim (1962). Panavision adapted the Angenieux 10× zoom for anamorphic productions. The 50-500 APZA was part of the standard anamorphic production package supported by Panavision from mid 1960s to the end of the 1970s. It has been used in numerous movies including The Graduate (1967), MASH (1970), McCabe and Mrs Miller (1971), Death in Venice (1971) and Jaws (1975). In 2013 and 2014 Angenieux released a new series of high end anamorphic zooms. These lenses, the 30-72 and 56-152 Optimo A2S are compact and weigh less than 2.5 kg.
- Joe Dunton & Company (JDC): A manufacturer and rental house based in Britain and North Carolina, which adapts spherical lenses to anamorphic by adding a cylindrical element. JDC was purchased by Panavision in 2007. Much of JDC's former lens inventory has since been scattered among various rental houses and private owners, though a new company called Dunton Cine has re-acquired a large portion of it.
  - Xtal Xpres (pronounced "Crystal Express") - This was JDC's most popular line of lenses. Three series were built by Shiga Optical Co. in Japan, from old Cooke S2/S3 and Panchro lenses, Canon lenses, and Zeiss lenses, respectively. The series overall encompassed a very wide range of focal lengths, from 18 mm up to 400 mm.
  - Speedstar - These are modified Zeiss Super Speeds.
- Elite Optics, manufactured by JSC Optica-Elite Company in St. Petersburg, Russia and sold in the United States by Slow Motion Inc. They are similar in quality to Hawk lenses, and are known for their sharpness and contrast at wide apertures.
- Todd-AO manufactured the Todd-AO 35 series of lenses in the 1970s. Designed by optical engineer Richard Vetter, these lenses were the first outside of Panavision to maintain a constant 2X squeeze across the entire focus range. They are known for having especially intense lens flares. The majority of these lenses are held today by Keslow Camera.

- TechnoVision , an Italian manufacturer (Henryk Chroscicki) with British and French offices, has adapted and rehoused spherical Cooke, Zeiss and Leitz lenses to anamorphics. Vittorio Storaro used them for Apocalypse Now and others. TechnoVision France was purchased by Panavision Europe in 2004.
- Isco Optics, a German company that developed the Arriscope line for Arri in 1989.
- Sirui Imaging builds specifically budget anamorphic hobbyist and cinema lenses. They build lenses made for all types of camera mounting systems, including those from Sony, Canon, and Nikon.
  - Saturn Series are sets of anamorphic lenses for Full Frame, developed for many different consumer mounting types.
  - Venus Series are also sets of fast anamorphic lenses for Full Frame sensors. With a 1.6x squeeze factor, these lenses give you a 2.8:1 aspect on a 16:9 capture area, and a 2.4:1 on a 3:2 capture area.
  - The company also produces lots of hobbyist lenses, such as the 50mm F1.8 1.33x APS-C Anamorphic Lens with a 1.33x squeeze factor. The hobbyist lenses are not measured in T-stops but rather F-stops for hobbyist simplicity.
- Vazen Anamorphic creates fast and large squeeze anamorphic lenses built for proper cinema, with the lenses coming in PL and Canon EF mounts, along with many hobbyist mounts such as Canon RF and Micro 4/3 sizes sensors. The lenses are built to cinema expectations and have 1.8x squeeze factors on both Micro 4/3 and Full Frame.

=== Projection ===
- ISCO Precision Optics is a manufacturer of theatrical cinema projection lenses.
- Panamorph is a manufacturer of hybrid cylindrical / prism based projection lenses specialized for the consumer home theater industry.
- Schneider Kreuznach, (also called Century Optics) are makers of anamorphic projection lenses. The company also manufactures add-on anamorphic adaptor lenses that can be mounted on digital video cameras.

== Super 35 and Techniscope ==
Although many films projected anamorphically have been shot using anamorphic lenses, there are often aesthetic and technical reasons that make shooting with spherical lenses preferable. If the director and cinematographer still wish to retain the 2.40:1 aspect ratio, anamorphic prints can be made from spherical negatives. Because the 2.40:1 image cropped from an Academy ratio 4-perf negative causes considerable waste of frame space, and since the cropping and anamorphosing of a spherical print requires an intermediate lab step, it is often attractive for these films to use a different negative pulldown method (most commonly 3-perf, but occasionally Techniscope 2-perf) usually in conjunction with the added negative space Super 35 affords.

However, with advancements in digital intermediate technology, the anamorphosing process can now be completed as a digital step with no degradation of image quality. Also, 3-perf and 2-perf pose minor problems for visual effects work. The area of the film in 4-perf work that is cropped out in the anamorphosing process nonetheless contains picture information that is useful for such visual effects tasks as 2D and 3D tracking. This mildly complicates certain visual effects efforts for productions using 3-perf and 2-perf, making anamorphic prints struck digitally from center cropped 4-perf Super 35 the popular choice in large budget visual effects driven productions.

== See also ==
- Arriscope
- Anamorphosis
- Aspect ratio
- Cine 160
- Letterbox
- List of film formats
- Pan and scan
- 21:9 aspect ratio
