= Arriscope (lens) =

Animorphic lens for movie camera

Arriscope is a line of anamorphic lenses especially for Arriflex developed by Germany's Isco Optic. ArriScope and ArriVision are a form of the CinemaScope/Panavision process with an aspect ratio of 2.39:1.

== Use ==
In the 1980s, ArriVision was used for a number of 3-D feature films, including Friday the 13th Part III (1982), Amityville 3-D (1983), and Jaws 3-D (1983). ArriScope was also used on the production of Body Snatchers (1993).

== Popularity and drawbacks ==
In general the lenses never became popular for anamorphic films because they are very heavy and had breathing problems. Arri have sold most of them to India and are not even renting them out any more. The current market for PL mount anamorphic lenses is being serviced by Vantage Film (makers of the Hawks lenses), Panavision, Arri (Master Anamorphics), Cooke Optics, Angenieux, Elite and Joe Dunton Company.

== Specifications ==
- Film gauge: 35mm
- Direction of travel: Vertical – four perforations – 24 frame/s
- Aperture Dimensions: 0.864" x 0.732" nominal
- Aspect ratio: 2.39:1
