= List of animals in political office =

There have been several instances of non-human animal candidates holding political office. In the United States, these candidates often hold honorary positions won through unofficial elections, typically in unincorporated areas with no official local government, although there have been cases of animals being elected to legitimate offices.

== List ==
Name	Species	Political office	Time in office	Notes	Refs.
Bode Ioiô	Goat	City councilor of Fortaleza, Brazil	c. 1922	Bode Ioiô (lit. Yoyo Goat) never ran for office, but won via write-in votes.	
Bosco Ramos	Dog	Mayor of Sunol, California	1981—1994	Bosco won the mayoral election in 1981 and served until his death in 1994. A bronze statue of him was erected in Sunol in 2008.	
Boston Curtis	Mule	Republican precinct captain of Milton, Washington	c. 1938	Boston Curtis ran unopposed. His campaign was created as a prank by mayor Kenneth Simmons.	
Clay Henry	Goat	Mayor of Lajitas, Texas	c. late 1980s—c. 1995	He frequently drank excessive amounts of beer and was killed in a fight by his son, Clay Henry Jr., who succeeded him in office. All mayors of Lajitas have since been part of the Clay Henry political family. His successor, Clay Henry III won an election against a cigar store Indian and a dog.	
Duke	Dog	Mayor of Cormorant, Minnesota	2015—2018	Duke was elected in 2015, winning a majority of the votes of the 12 people that lived in Cormorant at the time. He retired in 2018 before dying in 2019. In 2024, Duke was succeeded by Khaleesi Sherbrooke, another dog.	
Goofy Borneman-Calhoun	Dog	Mayor of Rabbit Hash, Kentucky	1998—2001	Goofy was the first mayor of Rabbit Hash and died in office. Rabbit Hash's mayoral elections are unofficial, and all of its elected mayors have been dogs.	
Max II	Dog	Mayor-for-life of Idyllwild–Pine Cove, California	2013—2022	Idyllwild's first mayor, Max, served from 2012 until 2013 when he died, and Max II completed his term. When he won reelection, he was declared mayor-for-life. After dying in 2022, Max II was succeeded by his cousin, Max III.	
Minerva	Cat	Mayor of the Somerville Community Path in Massachusetts	2025—	An election for mayor of the Sommerville Community Path was informally held in September 2025 between many pets and animals. Over 90 candidate lawn signs were placed on the side of the path by animal owners, and the ballot listed over 70 candidate animals. A cat named Minerva won the election, which attracted widespread news coverage. Minerva's campaign platform was simply the word "crime".	
Murfee	Dog	Mayor of Fair Haven, Vermont	2020—2021	Murfee the Cavalier King Charles Spaniel is a certified therapy dog that succeeded Lincoln the goat, who served as mayor in 2019. Murfee won reelection in 2021.	
Parker the Snow Dog	Dog	Mayor of Georgetown, Colorado	2020—2025	Parker, a Bernese Mountain Dog, was elected mayor in 2020. He was also the official mascot of the Loveland Ski Area and worked as a therapy dog. He died in 2025.	
Stubbs	Cat	Mayor of Talkeetna, Alaska	1997—2017	Stubbs won the 1997 mayoral election as a write-in candidate and remained in office until his death in 2017. He was succeeded by another cat named Aurora.	
Tucker Joyce	Dog	Mayor of Omena, Michigan	2009—2012	Tucker Joyce was Omena's first mayor. The town holds triennial mayoral elections, and all of its elected mayors have been animals.	

== See also ==
- Chief Mouser to the Cabinet Office
- Incitatus
- List of animals awarded human credentials
- List of Czech presidential pets
- List of Taiwanese presidential pets
- Pets of Vladimir Putin
- United States presidential pets
- Virtual politician
