= 1996 Origins Award winners =

The following are the winners of the 23rd annual (1996) Origins Award, presented at Origins 1997:

| Category | Winner | Company | Designer(s) |
|---|---|---|---|
| Best Fantasy or Science Fiction Figure Miniatures Series of 1996 | Warhammer 40,000: Chaos | Games Workshop | Developer: Robin Deus - Designer: Jeff Goodwin |
| Best Vehicular Miniatures Series of 1996 | Battletech: Mechs & Vehicles | Ral Partha Enterprises | Developer: Chuck Crain - Designers: Chris Atkin, Jim Johnson, Robert Kyde, David Summers, Jeff Wilhelm |
| Best Fantasy or Science Fiction Miniatures Rules of 1996 | Warhammer Fantasy Battles | Games Workshop | Designers: Andy Chambers, Bill King, Rick Priestley |
| Best Pre-20th Century Board Game of 1996 | Age of Renaissance | Avalon Hill | Designer: Jared Scarborough |
| Best Modern-Day Board Game of 1996 | Harpoon4 | Clash of Arms | Designer: Larry Bond, Chris Carlson |
| Best Fantasy or Science Fiction Board Game of 1996 | Settlers of Catan | Mayfair Games | Designer: Klaus Teuber |
| Best Card Game of 1996 (three-way tie) | Legend of Five Rings: Battle of Beiden Pass | Five Rings Publishing | Designer: Dave Williams |
| Best Card Game of 1996 (three-way tie) | Lunch Money | Atlas Games | Designer: Charlie Wiedman |
| Best Card Game of 1996 (three-way tie) | Mythos | Chaosium | Designer: Charlie Krank |
| Best Roleplaying Rules of 1996 | Deadlands | Pinnacle Entertainment Group, Inc. | Designer and Writer: Shane Hensley |
| Best Roleplaying Adventure of 1996 | The Complete Masks of Nyarlathotep | Chaosium | Designers and Writers: Larry DiTillio, Lynn Willis |
| Best Roleplaying Supplement of 1996 | Six Guns and Sorcery | R. Talsorian | Writers: Edward Bolme, James Cambias, Eric Floch, Angela Hyatt, Jim Parks, Derek Quintanar, Barrie Rosen, Mark Schumann, Chris Williams |
| Best Graphic Presentation of a Roleplaying Game, Adventure, or Supplement of 1996 | Deadlands | Pinnacle Entertainment Group, Inc. | Graphic Designers: Tim Link, Jay Lloyd Neal, Charles Ryan |
| Best Game Accessory of 1996 | Cthulhu for President | Chaosium | Designers and Writers: Shannon Appel, Les Brooks, Charlie Krank, Paul Lidberg |
| Best Fantasy or Science Fiction Computer Game of 1996 | Master of Orion II | Microprose | Designers: Steve Barcia, Ken Burd |
| Best Game-Related Fiction of 1996 | The Cthulhu Cycle | Chaosium | Editor: Robert M. Price - Authors: Donald R. Burleson, Leonard Carpenter, Pierre Comtois, August W. Derleth, Lord Dunsany, Alan Dean Foster, C. J. Henderson, M. R. James, H. P. Lovecraft, Will Murray, Steven Paulsen, David C. Smith. |
| Best Professional Game Magazine of 1996 | Shadis Magazine | Alderac | Publisher: John Zinser - Editor: Rob Vaux |
| Best Amateur Game Magazine of 1996 | Mechforce Quarterly | Publisher: Mech Force | Editor: Jean Rabe |
| Best Historical Figure Miniatures Series of 1996 | Daimyo 25mm | Reaper Miniatures | Designer: Bob Charrette |
| Best Historical Miniatures Rules of 1996 | Hostile Aircraft 2nd Ed. | Goblintooth Enterprises | Designer: Brian Reddington-Wilde |
| Best Miniatures Accessory Series of 1996 | Wild West Hollow 25mm House | Tactical Conflict Systems | Designer: Leo Walsh |
| Best Graphic Presentation of a Board Game of 1996 | Battletech 4th ed. | FASA Corp. | Art Director: Jim Nelson |
| Best Play-by-Mail Game of 1996 | Middle Earth Play-By-Mail | Game Systems, Inc. | Designers: William B. Feild, Jr., Peter G. Stassun |
| Best New Play-by-Mail Game of 1996 | Starship Command | Elite Simulations | Designer: Brian Hansen |
| Best Military or Strategy Computer Game of 1996 | Wooden Ships & Iron Men | Avalon Hill | Executive Producer: Mike Daninnella |
| Best Graphic Presentation of a Card Game or Expansion of 1996 | Middle Earth: The Dragons | Iron Crown Enterprises | Graphic Designers: Pete Fenlon, Jason Hawkins, Nick Morawitz, Jessica Ney-Grimm |
| 1997 Adventure Gaming Hall of Fame Inductees | Darwin Bromley | | |
| 1997 Adventure Gaming Hall of Fame Inductees | Advanced Dungeons & Dragons | TSR, Inc. | Designer: E. Gary Gygax |
| 1997 Adventure Gaming Hall of Fame Inductees | Cosmic Encounter | Eon Products, Inc. | Designers: Bill Eberle, Jack Kittridge, Bill Norton, Peter Olotka |
| 1997 Adventure Gaming Hall of Fame Inductees | Traveller | Game Designers Workshop | Designer: Marc Miller |
