= Bosco Ramos =

Former honorary mayor of Sunol, California

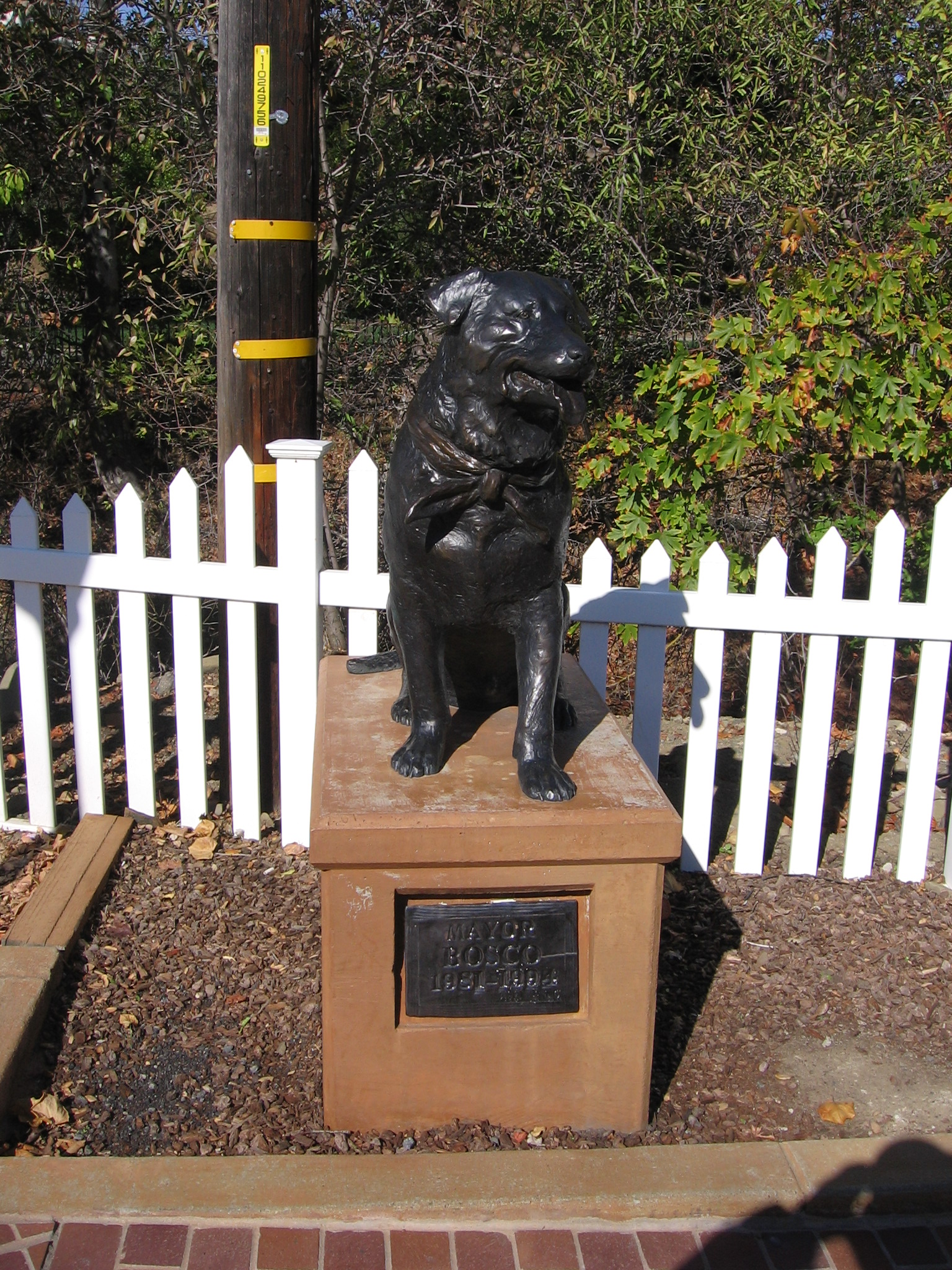
- A statue of Bosco at the Sunol post office.

Mayor of Sunol, California
- Honorary
- In office 1981–1994

Personal details
- Died: 1994
- Species: Dog
- Breed: Black Labrador Retriever and Rottweiler mix
- Sex: Male

Bosco Ramos was a dog elected honorary mayor of the unincorporated community of Sunol, California, United States. He was a black Labrador Retriever and Rottweiler mix, usually known simply as "Bosco". Bosco defeated two humans to win the honorary mayoral election in 1981, and served until his death in 1994. Bosco achieved international attention in 1984 when the British tabloid the Daily Star covered his election, describing Sunol as "the wackiest town in the world". He appeared with his owner, Tom Stillman, as a contestant on the game show 3rd Degree, where the panelists failed to guess Bosco's occupation. In 1990, the Chinese newspaper the People's Daily reported on his tenure as an alleged example of the failings of the American electoral process, but in response, Sunol residents commented that the dog's office was "merely a joke".

== Legacy ==
A statue of Bosco was erected in front of the town Post Office in 2008. It was designed by the Russian sculptor Lena Toritch. A bar, Bosco's Bones and Brew, later Bosco's Roadhouse, was named in his honor.

== See also ==
- Non-human electoral candidates
- List of animals in political office
- List of individual dogs
