= Non-human electoral candidate =

Candidate proposed for satire or protest

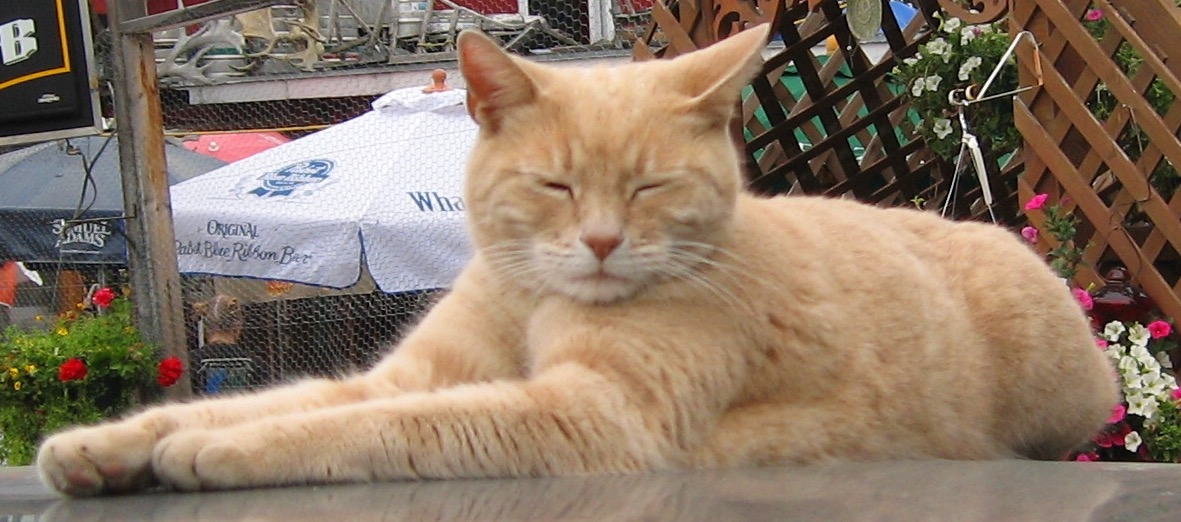
Stubbs, former honorary mayor of Talkeetna, Alaska

Non-human electoral candidates have been found in a number of countries. Often, the candidacies are a means of casting a protest vote or satirizing the political system. At other times, it is simply done for entertainment value.

Electoral regulations may explicitly require candidates to be human (or equivalent wording), or they may require candidates to do things which animals cannot reasonably do (such as sign their names legibly on legal forms); most constituencies require candidates to be of the age of a legal adult, which eliminates many animals whose life expectancies usually make them too young to ever qualify. On some occasions, however, animals and virtual politicians have been accepted as candidates, and they have even won office.

== Notable examples ==
=== Elected to office ===
- In 1967, in a write-in only election, the small town of Picoazá, Ecuador, elected the foot deodorant Pulvapies as its new municipal councilman.
- Mayor Stubbs, a cat, was elected as the mayor of Talkeetna, Alaska from 1997 to 2017.
- Mayor Max, elected Mayor of Idyllwild, California

=== Non-elected candidates ===
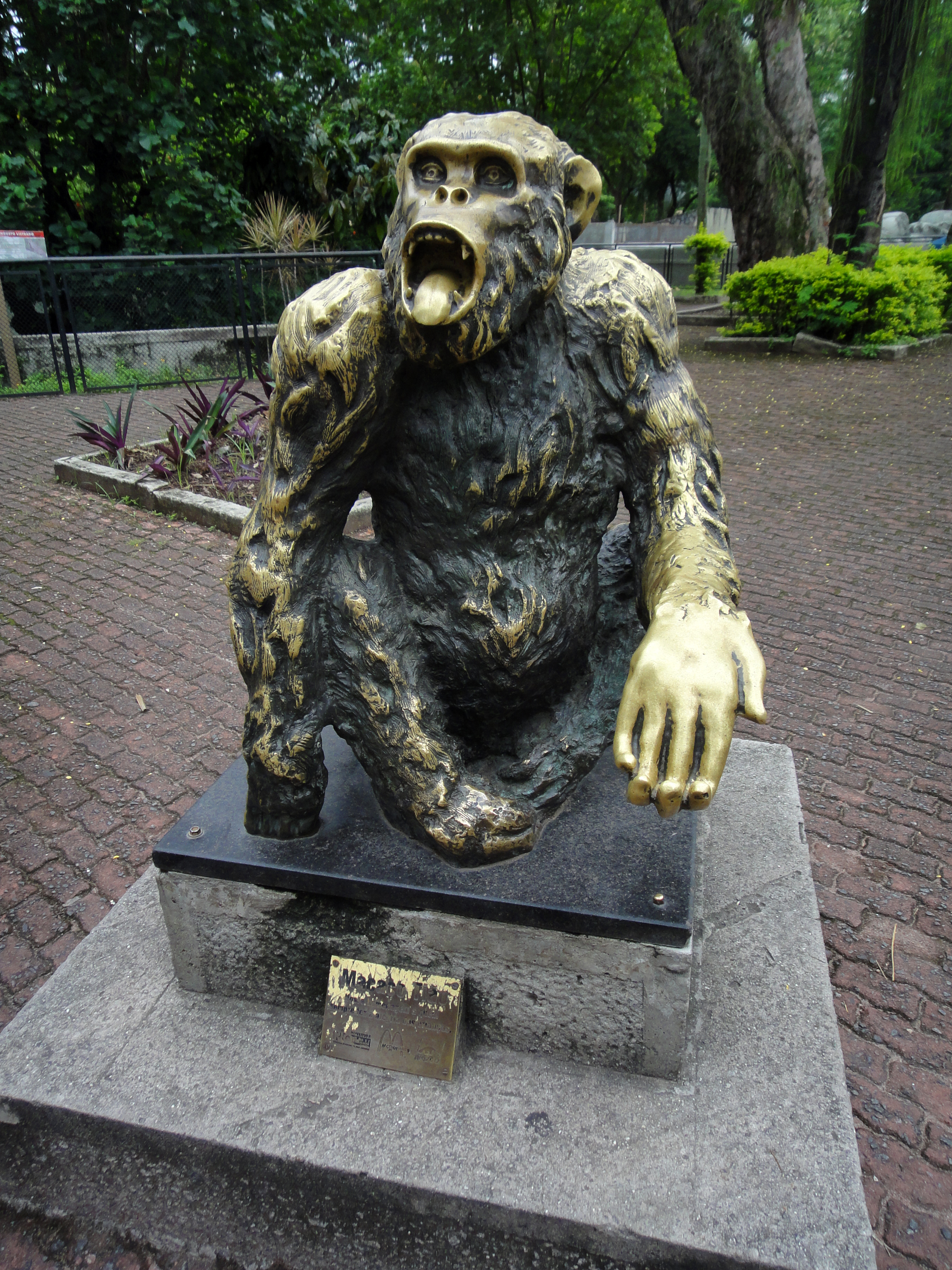
A statue of Macaco Tião, a candidate for mayor of Rio de Janeiro, is exhibited at the Rio de Janeiro Zoological Garden.

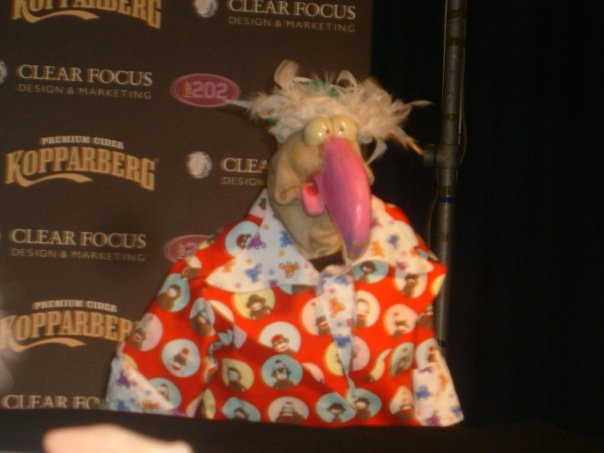
Dustin the Turkey, a puppet, received thousands of votes in Ireland's 1997 presidential election.

- Snæfellsjökull, a glacier in the Snæfellsnes peninsula in Iceland, was a nominee to run in the 2024 Icelandic presidential elections.
- The entire planet Earth was nominated by The Planetary Democrats as a candidate in the 2024 European Parliament elections.
- Cacareco, a rhinoceros at the São Paulo zoo, was a candidate for the 1958 city council elections with the intention of protesting against political corruption. Electoral officials did not accept Cacareco's candidacy, but she eventually won 100,000 votes, more than any other party in that same election (which was also marked by rampant absenteeism). Today, the term voto Cacareco (Cacareco vote) is commonly used to describe protest votes in Brazil. Cacareco's candidacy inspired the Rhinoceros Party of Canada, nominally led by the rhinoceros Cornelius the First.
- Pigasus the Immortal was a boar hog that the Yippies nominated as a candidate in the 1968 U.S. presidential election.
- Mr. Potato Head, a toy manufactured by Hasbro, received four votes in Boise, Idaho's mayoral election in 1985.
- A cat named Morris was a candidate for mayor of Xalapa, Mexico, in 2013.
- In 1989, regional council boundaries were redrawn in New Zealand, with an emphasis on catchments being connected. These revised maps made Whangamōmona part of the Manawatū-Whanganui Region. Residents wanted to continue to be part of the Taranaki Region, and on 1 November 1989, they responded by declaring themselves the "Republic of Whangamomona" at the first Republic Day. At every Republic Day, they vote to either keep the seating President or to vote in a new one. Since 1999, they have had Billy Gumboot the Goat (1999–2001) and Tai the Poodle (2003–2004), the latest being Murt "Murtle the Turtle" Kennard (2005–2015).
- In 1987, Silvio, a chimpanzee from Córdoba, Argentina, was put as a provincial deputy candidate.
- Tião, a bad-tempered chimpanzee, was put forward by the fictional Brazilian Banana Party (Partido Bananista Brasileiro, actually the satirical group Casseta & Planeta) as a candidate for the Rio de Janeiro mayoralty in 1988. The campaign's slogan was "Vote monkey – get monkey" (because people were tired of voting for one platform and then seeing the elected officials implementing another one). There is no official counting, because all votes were recorded as "null", but it is estimated that Tião received over 400,000 votes, coming third.
- New Zealand's McGillicuddy Serious Party entered a goat in a local Waiheke Island election, but their attempt to have a hedgehog stand for Parliament was unsuccessful.
- In 2001, a Dachshund called Saucisse (Sausage) was a candidate for municipal elections in Marseille, France. He won 4% of the vote. Eight years later, in 2009, he participated in the third season of Secret Story, the French version of Big Brother. He entered the house on Day 36. His secret is that he was a candidate in the Marseille mayoral race. To protect his secret, he entered the house with the nickname "Secret".
- Molly the Dog, a dachshund from Oklahoma, named as a candidate in the 2008 U.S. presidential election.
- United States TV host and California councilmember Charlotte Laws had a chicken named Mae Poulet who ran for vice president on the Bully ticket in the 2012 election.
- Hank the Cat, a Maine Coon from Northern Virginia, ran against Tim Kaine and George Allen for Virginia's Senate seat in 2012. He earned third place in the state, with nearly 7,000 votes.
- Tuxedo Stan, a cat from Halifax, Nova Scotia, Canada, was a mayoral candidate in the 2012 municipal elections representing the Tuxedo Party, a political movement aimed to improve the welfare of felines in the Halifax Regional Municipality, "because neglect isn't working". He has been endorsed by celebrities including Anderson Cooper.
- A fire hydrant ran for election multiple times 2004–2008 at the University of British Columbia, including a position on the Board of Governors, coming within 6% of being elected.
- Dona de Chocolate, a mascot for Mister Donut in El Salvador, ran as a presidential candidate during 2014 as part of an advertising campaign called "Partidona" to promote the 2x1 promotion during September. Dona de Chocolate challenged the other candidates to a debate in a Mister Donut restaurant in El Platillo Merliot, which was unsuccessful. Dona de Chocolate also went to the Asamblea Legislativa to give a speech, but it was also unsuccessful. Dona de Chocolate appeared as a cameo in an episode of Capitán Centroamerica series by Puya Web.
- AI Steve, a candidate based on generative AI, ran as an MP candidate for the Brighton Pavilion constituency during the 2024 UK general election. The policy of the candidate was based on automatic summarization of feedback provided by the voters. Businessman Steve Endacott, provided the platform and registered to be the in-person representative of AI Steve in actual parliamentary sessions in the case of it winning. In the election, AI Steve finished last of eight candidates with 179 votes, a share of 0.3%.
- In 1976, Marvel Comics announced that their character Howard the Duck would run in that year's election for the U.S. presidency.

=== Attempted or withdrawn candidates ===
Those that were not on the ballot, in chronological order.

- Incitatus, the favorite horse of Roman emperor Caligula (reigned 37–41 AD), is said to have been nominated for consul.
- Nobody for President was a parodic campaign for president of the U.S. presidential election of 1976, First nominated by Wavy Gravy outside of the Republican National Convention of 1976 in Kansas City, again as the Yippies' nominee.
- Colossus the Gorilla, the main attraction at Benson's Wild Animal Farm in Hudson, New Hampshire, failed to be put on the ballot in the 1980 New Hampshire Republican presidential primary. The simian's candidacy was promoted by Benson's, but the zoo's argument that the U.S. Constitution does not specify that a native-born candidate for the presidency had to be human was rejected.

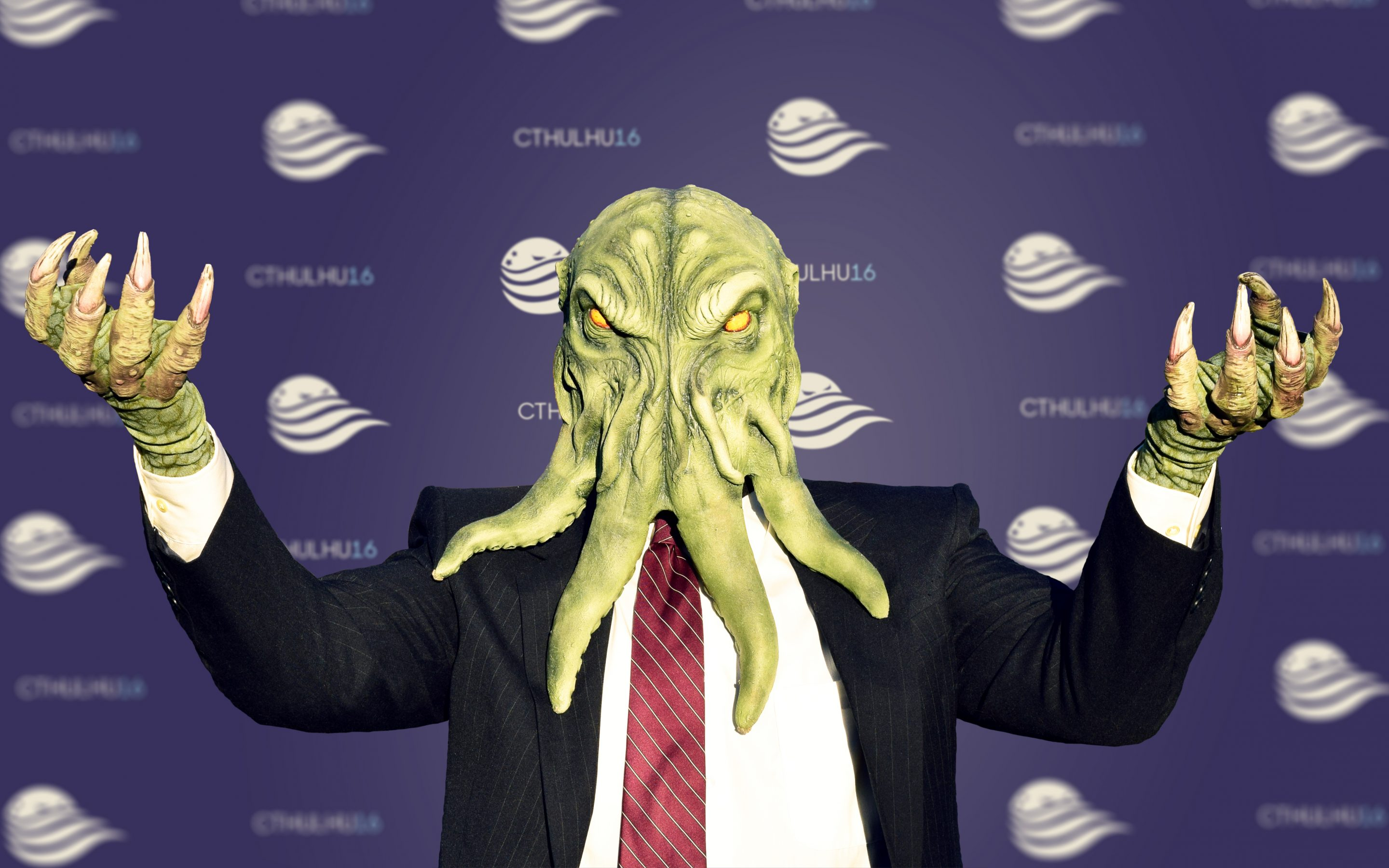
Cosmic horror and 2016 US presidential candidate Cthulhu on the campaign trail

- Campaigns for fictional elder horror Cthulhu for President have been produced for all United States presidential elections since 1996, as well as for elections in Spain and Poland.
- United States film maker Michael Moore attempted to get a potted ficus tree onto the ballot as a candidate for United States Representative in 2000.
- Giggles the Pig was set to run for mayor of Flint, Michigan, in 2015. Lawyer Michael Ewing started "Giggles the Pig for Flint Mayor" as a write-in campaign after a city clerk's office error threatened to keep all candidates' names off the August, 2015 mayoral primary election. Ewing said the candidacy "sought to draw more attention to the mayoral race, better educate voters about their choices and encourage residents to demand more of elected officials." Giggles attracted many online fans, while the "other candidates for mayor were less amused." The write-in campaign was cancelled after state officials fixed the mistake and allowed four candidates' names to appear on the ballot, and the race had become "No longer an even playing field" for Giggles. Giggles' Facebook page was then to be used to share good news stories about Flint.
- Limberbutt McCubbins, a male cat from Kentucky, was registered with the Federal Election Commission as a Democratic candidate for the 2016 United States presidential election. It was brought to national attention by The Rachel Maddow Show and the cat's candidacy was endorsed by Jezebel. Politifact rated the legitimacy of Limberbutt McCubbins' candidacy as "half true", noting that the FEC did not formally consider the cat a candidate because he hadn't spent or received $5,000. Emilee McCubbins, who owns the cat, and Isaac Weiss, who came up with the idea, said they wanted to encourage reform of the FEC, stating that it only took "20 minutes" to register as a candidate, and that they did not even require a social security number. They also wanted to encourage voter registration, particularly young voters.
- Crawfish B. Crawfish is a crawfish from Louisiana. Crawfish's campaign for the United States presidency began on Facebook on a page titled "Can This Crawfish Get More Supporters Than Bobby Jindal?", created on May 31, 2015. The campaign began to receive media attention after Louisiana governor Bobby Jindal announced his bid for the 2016 Presidential race. After Jindal's announcement, Crawfish received media attention from outlets such as The Huffington Post, Salon magazine, Bustle, and popular Louisiana-based publications NOLA Defender and Gambit. Crawfish officially registered with the Federal Election Commission, running for a non-listed party, on July 2, 2015. Crawfish has stated his support of education, gender equality, same-sex marriage, and Game of Thrones, while criticizing the strict bi-partisan system.
- Harambe was falsely identified as receiving thousands of write-in votes during the 2016 US Presidential Election. Despite a lack of evidence, the claim attracted significant social media attention.

=== Other non-elected posts ===
- Catmando, a political cat, served as joint leader of Britain's Official Monster Raving Loony Party (OMRLP) from 1999 to 2002, along with his owner, Howling Laud Hope.

== Folklore and pop culture ==
The 2013 Black Mirror episode "The Waldo Moment" explores the concept of a cartoon character electoral candidate. Several news reports, including one by Chris Cillizza, political reporter for The Washington Post, compared the 2016 Donald Trump political campaign to the episode; later, in September 2016, episode writer Charlie Brooker also compared the Trump campaign to The Waldo Moment and predicted Trump would win the 2016 election.

The nerd-folk song "President Snakes" from the 2015 album of the same name by the music duo The Doubleclicks explores how five snakes run as one electoral candidate.

== See also ==
- Chief Mouser to the Cabinet Office
- Jedi census phenomenon
- List of animals awarded human credentials
- List of frivolous political parties
- List of individual cats
- List of individual dogs
- List of practical joke topics
- Novelty candidate
