= Six gun =

A six gun is folk name for a revolver.

Six Gun or variants may also refer to:

== American western films ==
- Six-Gun Trail, a 1938 American western film
- Six-Gun Gold, a 1941 American western film
- Six Gun Gospel, a 1943 American western film
- Six-Gun Serenade, a 1947 American western film
- Six Gun Mesa, a 1950 American western film

== Other ==
- Six-Gun Snow White, a 2013 fantasy novella
- Six-Gun Shootout, a 1985 video game
- Six Gun Territory, a defunct American theme park

== See also ==
- Six Guns (disambiguation)
- Six shooter (disambiguation)
