= Six Guns =

Six Guns and variants may refer to:

- 6 Guns, a 2010 American Western film
- Six-Guns, a 2011 video game
- Albuquerque Six-Guns, a defunct hockey team
- Six-Guns & Sorcery, a Castle Falkenstein game supplement

== See also ==
- Six gun, folk name for a Revolver
- Six shooter (disambiguation)
- Six gun (disambiguation)
