= Virtual politician =

Artificial candidate or officeholder

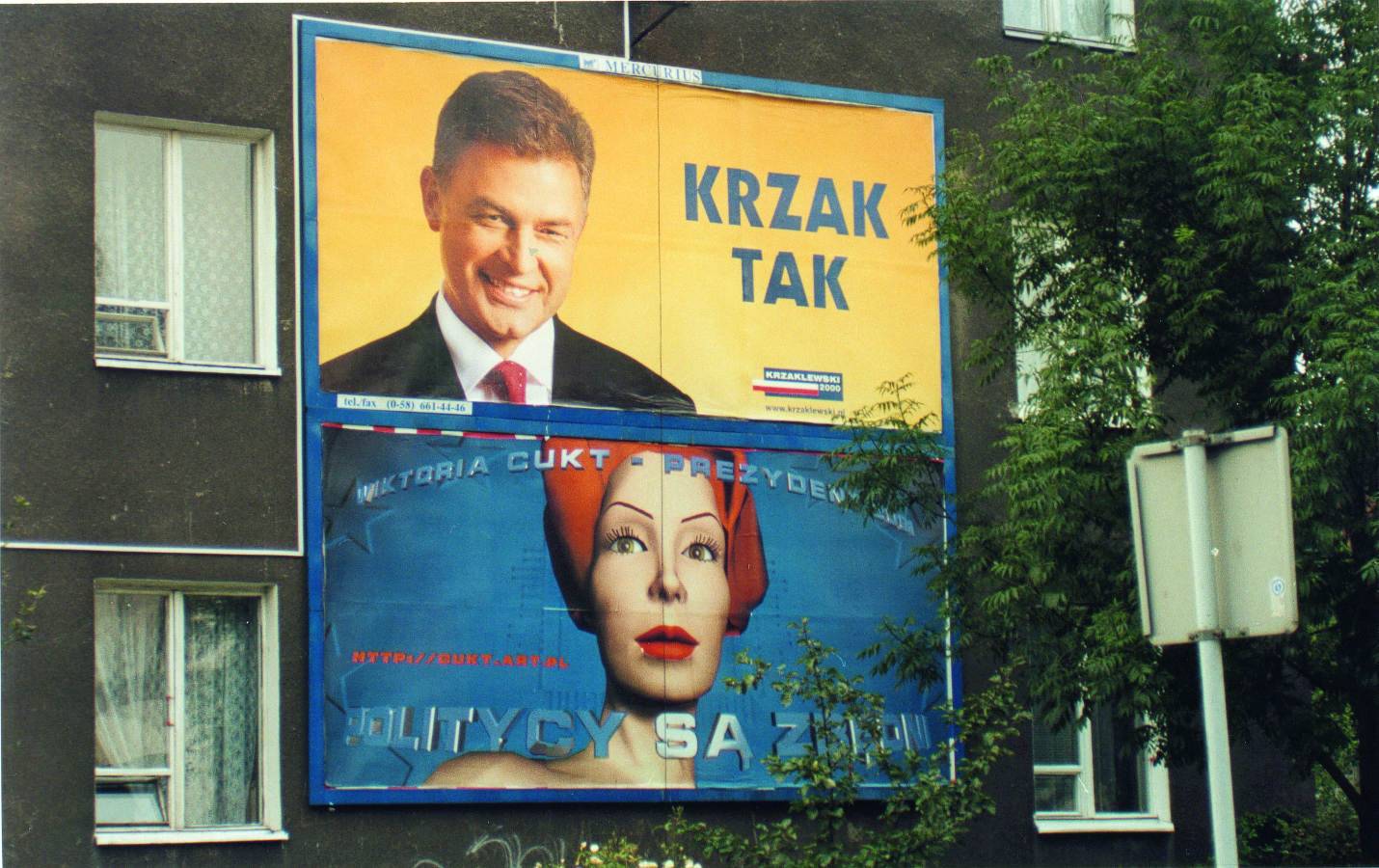
Election poster of Wiktoria Cukt from 2001, she is considered the first known virtual political candidate.

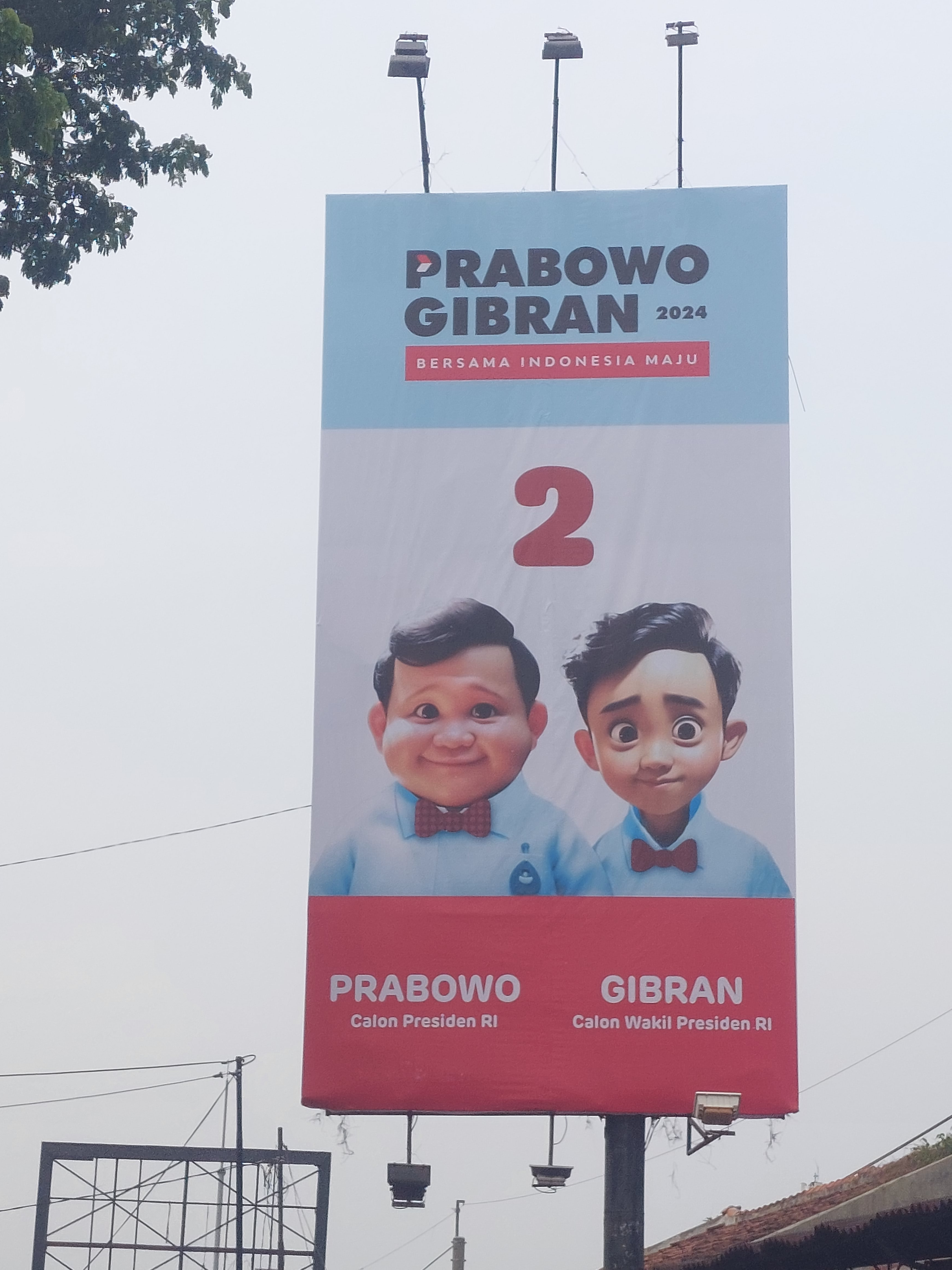
Billboard of AI-generated presidential candidate and running mate in Indonesia.

A virtual politician, or AI politician, is an artificial entity seeking or in government office. A virtual politician would have similar power to a human serving in the same position, but would be programmed to make choices based on a purpose-built artificial intelligence.

Since the dawn of AI, machines have been put to work in various positions formerly held by humans for different reasons; repetitive tasks, or else to lighten the workload of humans. AI is increasingly being put to work in tasks that require human traits, such as empathy, but has been used to replace human imperfections. It is thought by some that if an artificial intelligence, programmed on the right data, were to be placed in a position of power, it would be able to make informed decisions quickly, and be able to give attention to the perspectives and needs of all whom it has power over.

In 2019, the Centre for the Governance of Change at IE University found in a survey that a quarter of Europeans would want government by algorithm at some capacity. The department and journals that reported on the poll claimed that the result was likely due to the ongoing political climate of Brexit, saying this caused the "growing mistrust citizens feel towards governments and politicians".

== Examples ==
=== Wiktoria Cukt ===
Wiktoria Cukt was a virtual candidate for president of Poland in the 2001 elections, created by a group of Gdańsk-based artists working under the name "Centralny Urząd Kultury Technicznej" (CUKT).

The project was aimed at promoting a computer program called “Citizen's Election Software” (OSW), which allowed Internet users to co-create views and images of Wiktoria, representing the idea of a “president for everyone.” The campaign, run under the slogan “Politicians are unnecessary.” was an artistic experiment criticizing traditional politics and promoting direct democracy in the digital space.

Wiktoria gained a lot of media attention, appearing on magazine covers and billboards, but was not an electoral success. The CUKT project, composed of Rafał Ewertowski, Robert Jurkowski, Jacek Niegoda, Maciej Sienkiewicz and Piotr Wyrzykowski, among others, combined art, technology and activism, revealing the mechanisms of media and politics.

=== SAM ===
"SAM" is the name given to what is generally considered to be the first virtual politician. SAM was created by New Zealand developer Nick Gerritsen, and designed to represent the views and wants of people in New Zealand. SAM is also linked to social media, in order to immediately address the concerns of voters.

SAM was developed by a Wellington-based technology group involving Gerritsen, Victoria University of Wellington researcher Walter Langelaar, and software company Touch Tech. Contemporary reporting described Gerritsen as the group's spokesperson, Langelaar as conducting the research phase, and Touch Tech as helping to develop the platform.

SAM was initially intended to be put forward as a candidate in the New Zealand 2020 elections.

SAM was rebranded to Parker Politics in 2023.

=== Alice ===
The chatbot "Alice" or "Alisa" was nominated against Vladimir Putin for the 2018 Russian presidential election, built by Yandex. Similar to SAM, it was intended to be a public-minded and easily accessible bot through social media. It lost to Putin, but still gained a large portion of the vote.

=== Leader Lars ===
The chatbot "Leader Lars" or "Leder Lars" was nominated for The Synthetic Party to run in the 2022 Danish parliamentary election, and was built by the artist collective Computer Lars. Leader Lars differed from earlier virtual politicians by leading a political party and by not pretending to be an objective candidate. This chatbot engaged in critical discussions on politics with users from around the world.

=== AI Steve ===
AI Steve was a candidate in Brighton Pavilion constituency, United Kingdom in 2024.

=== Diella ===
Diella is the first non-human artificially intelligent minister in the world. She was appointed in Albania, making them the first country to have a fully AI politician in office. Diella was created with the intention to reduce corruption within the public procurement sector of the Albanian government. The agency that created Diella, the National Information Agency, is currently under investigation due to accusations of contract manipulation. The director and deputy director of the National Information Agency have not been charged, but were put under house arrest.

Prime Minister Edi Rama has spoken out against widespread corruption within the country. Rama has repeatedly mentioned his desire to join the European Union. During his most recent election, Rama promised that Albania will be part of the European Union by the year 2030.

=== Mark Sewards Chatbot ===
Mark Sewards, a government representative of West Yorkshire England, has publicly accessible chatbot of himself. Sewards worked with an AI company to create the AI chatbot. The people he represents can talk and ask question to the chatbot. Sewards believes this using the chatbot can help representatives and the people that they represent have a closer and more involved relationship.

=== Michihito Matsuda AI Robot ===
A man in Japan named Michihito Matsuda, developed an AI-powered humanoid robot. In 2018, the robot was a candidate in the mayoral race of Tama, Japan. The robot did not win the mayoral election. Matsuda believed that the humanoid robot would be beneficial to the local community by listening to citizens requests and evaluating them.

=== Imran Khan Clone ===
The former Prime Minister of Pakistan, Imran Khan, was sentenced to 3 years in prison. Khan was jailed due to numerous charges of corruption including asset concealment. He claimed the charges were brought upon him to politically silence him but authorities stated that the charges were not politically motivated. While in prison, Khan used an AI clone of himself to conduct rallies on social media platforms. His speech was generated by AI using a script he wrote while in prison. The broadcast was watched by 6 million people between different streaming platforms but faced multiple interruptions. Khan believes that his speech was intentional disrupted as a form of political censorship. He later claimed that the Pakistani government was to blame for intentionally slowing down internet speeds in order to interfere with his broadcast. The Pakistani government has since denied these claims.

=== VIC ===
In 2024, Wyoming resident Victor Miller filed to run for mayor of Cheyenne Wyoming. Miller claimed that he was the face of the mayor but an AI assistant named VIC would help him with the job. VIC stands for virtual integrated citizen. After the announcement there was public pushback that prompted Laramie County to make a statement. Open AI then cut off Victor Millar's access to ChatGPT, the website he was using for his AI assistant. Open AI claims that he violated their company policies by using their service to persuade voters.

== Criticism ==
Most moves toward any kind of virtual presence in government have been criticised, and while AI candidates have gained press traction in elections they've run in, they remain unpopular in the polls. One of the main criticisms is that a deep learning algorithm isn't advanced enough to be in a position of power, and they may not be able to understand the human qualities and skills to properly assess solutions, or create new policies. It's argued that AI will not be able to comprehend the deep complexities of human society, and will not make choices that cater to that.

=== Objectivity ===
Artificially intelligent models require data to learn, and some complain that the data will not be objective enough. In the past, AI has been known to have trained on biased data, and thus, when in positions of important use, made costly mistakes. The purpose of having an AI politician would be the ability to work better than a human, and in theory it would be able to satisfy the political agenda of the people it had power over.

== See also ==
- List of animals in political office
- Non-human electoral candidate
- Novelty candidate
