= Idyllwild, Pine Cove, and Fern Valley =

Community in Riverside County

Idyllwild, Pine Cove, Fern Valley
- Unincorporated communities Census-designated place
- Idyllwild–Pine Cove
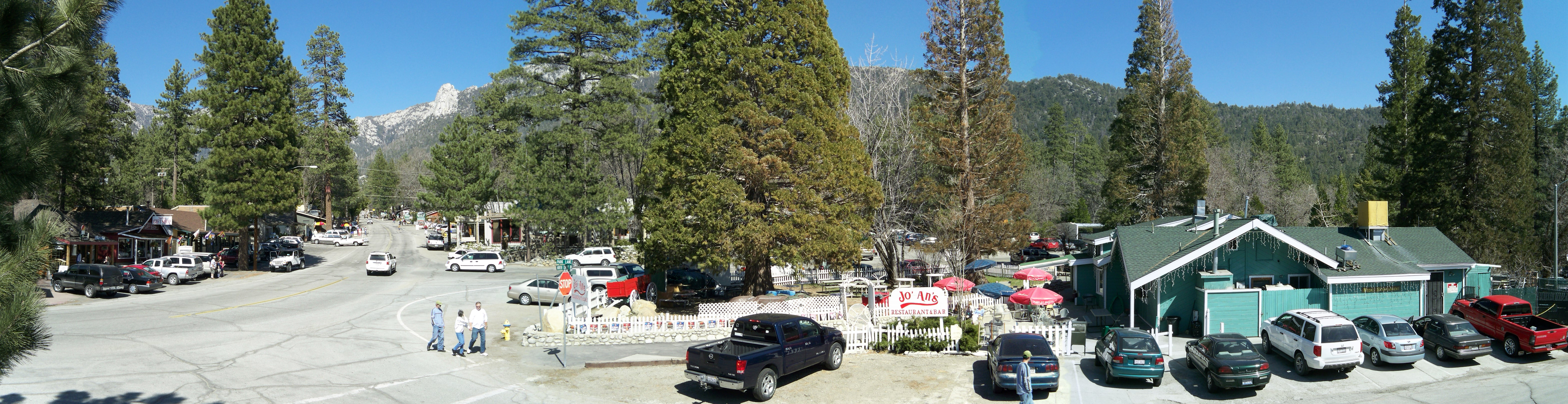
- Idyllwild

- Location within Riverside County and California

- Location in the United States Idyllwild, Pine Cove, Fern Valley (California) Idyllwild, Pine Cove, Fern Valley (the United States)
- Coordinates: 33°44′40″N 116°43′33″W
- Country: United States
- State: California
- County: Riverside

Area
  - Total: 13.733 sq mi (35.568 km^{2})
  - Land: 13.723 sq mi (35.542 km^{2})
  - Water: 0.010 sq mi (0.026 km^{2}) 0.07%
- Elevation: 5,413 ft (1,650 m)

Population (2020)
  - Total: 4,163
  - Density: 303.4/sq mi (117.1/km^{2})
- Time zone: UTC−8 (Pacific)
  - Summer (DST): UTC−7 (PDT)
- ZIP code: 92549
- Area code: 951
- FIPS code: 06-36203
- GNIS feature ID: 2408414

Idyllwild, Pine Cove, and Fern Valley are three adjacent unincorporated communities in the San Jacinto Mountains in Riverside County, California, United States. Idyllwild has the largest population of the three. For statistical purposes, the United States Census Bureau has defined Idyllwild–Pine Cove as a census-designated place (CDP). The CDP's population was 4,163 at the 2020 census, up from 3,874 at the 2010 census.

Idyllwild is adjacent to the Pacific Crest Trail.

"Mile-high Idyllwild" is a mountain resort about one-mile (1,600 m) in altitude. Idyllwild is flanked by two large rock formations, Tahquitz Peak and Suicide Rock, which are famous in Southern California rock-climbing circles. It offers no skiing, so "the Hill" has been minimally developed over the years and remains a center for hiking, mountain and rock climbing, mountain biking, and horseback riding.

== History ==
Idyllwild was once the summer home for bands of Cahuilla Indians, who migrated there to escape the heat of lower-elevation deserts. The Cahuilla's grinding slabs can still be seen in Idyllwild.

Idyllwild was originally known as Strawberry Valley because of the wild strawberries that grow there, especially beside the creek that runs through the town, Strawberry Creek. Shepherds regularly brought their flocks to the valley. In the 1880s, the Domenigoni family of San Jacinto homesteaded land near what is now Idyllwild Arts Academy. In 1889, George and Sarah Hannahs built a summer camp next to their sawmill in upper Dutch Flat and named it Camp Idyllwilde. By the 1890s a toll road had been built from Hemet, which opened Idyllwild to settlement, logging, and tourism. A post office was established in 1893; at this time, the town was called Rayneta after the Hannahs' son Raymond.

In 1901, the Idyllwild Sanatorium was built to treat tuberculosis patients. It was soon remodeled as a resort called Idyllwild Among the Pines, and later Idyllwild. The same year, the town's name was changed to Idyllwild.

The Tribe of Tahquitz Boy Scout honor society was created in Idyllwild in 1925.

With the advent of the automobile, Idyllwild became a weekend tourist attraction for Southern Californians. For many years, the town presented itself as an alpine village, and hotels and businesses had German or German-sounding names, but this practice ended during World War II.

From the 1930s to the 1950s, Idyllwild was a center for the production of "knotty pine furniture", the fine log furniture made in the Arts and Crafts style. Under Charles "Selden" Belden's direction, the furniture was produced by the Idyllwild Pinecraft Furniture Company and, later, C. Selden Belden Idyllwild Pinecraft. The furniture is now "collectible" and can be found in many Idyllwild houses and cabins.

In the 1950s, the Yosemite Decimal System of grading routes was developed at Tahquitz by members of the Rock Climbing Section of the Angeles Chapter of the Sierra Club.

In the late 1960s and 1970s, there was an influx of hippies to Idyllwild that changed the town and alarmed many longtime residents. Timothy Leary lived on a ranch in nearby Garner Valley, with the ranch serving as the headquarters of The Brotherhood of Eternal Love. In 2019 YouTube celebrity Logan Paul bought the ranch.

From 1974 to 1979, Idyllwild hosted the Idyllwild Bluegrass Invitational, then Southern California's only bluegrass music festival (it was inspired by the Julian Banjo-Fiddle Contest, which takes place on the third weekend in September). From the 1950s through the 1970s Idyllwild also hosted the Bear Flag Festival, which honored California's Bear Flag and marked the passing of the grizzly bear from California, the last of which, according to local legend, was killed at Hurkey Creek in Garner Valley.

Most high school-age students in Idyllwild attend school in Hemet, which requires them to travel by school bus some 35 miles (56 km) in distance and 3,000 feet (910 m) in altitude to and from school. Since the 1950s, some Idyllwild parents have advocated for a high school in the town. There have been many attempts at establishing high schools, but most were short-lived. Startup schools that failed included Hi-Lo, or LIFE (Living in Free Education, a public school where Idyllwild Arts Academy now stands, operated by Mary Glavin in 1973–76), New Schole Ranch (a private school in Mountain Center), and Freedom Schools, Inc. (a private school operated in Mountain Center by Mary Ellen DuBay). Desert Sun School (later called the Elliott-Pope School), a private boarding school that accepted boarders and day students, closed in December 1990, due to financial mischief, after operating for 65 years.

Idyllwild, Garner Valley and Lake Hemet have been used for filming since the silent film era. Although most of Cecil B. DeMille's The Squaw Man (1914) was filmed in the Los Angeles vicinity, footage of cattle on the open range were shot at the "H.J." Ranch at Keen Camp, midway between Idyllwild and Garner Valley. A number of Westerns have been filmed at the Garner Ranch in Garner Valley: Guns and Guitars (1936), Heading for the Rio Grande (1936), Springtime in the Rockies (1937), Brothers in the Saddle (1949), Riders of the Range (1949), and Storm over Wyoming (1950). The Garner Ranch also stood in for the Ponderosa in episodes of the TV show Bonanza. In 1961 and 1962, the Elvis Presley musical Kid Galahad was filmed in the Idyllwild vicinity. The 1980s television series Air Wolf and various car commercials were also filmed in the area. The biker funeral procession from the 1966 film The Wild Angels was filmed in Idyllwild and included the Silver Pines Lodge, which was named Hillbilly Lodge at the time of filming. Some of Steven Suptic's Sugar Pine 7, a YouTube comedy series, takes place in Idyllwild.

In 2012, a Golden Retriever named Max was elected as the "Mayor" of Idyllwild (which, as part of an unincorporated community, has no local government) out of a running of fourteen dogs and two cats as part of a fundraising event held by and for the non-profit organization Idyllwild Animal Rescue Friends (ARF). In 2013, Mayor Max died, and Maximus Mighty-Dog Mueller II, another Golden Retriever, arrived in Idyllwild to complete the remainder of the term. In March 2014, as the end of Max's term approached, Idyllwild Animal Rescue Friends surveyed the people of Idyllwild, inquiring for their interest in another election. The response was widespread and consistent: they wanted Mayor Max for life. No other elections were held and the Mayor Maxes have assumed the positions. Mayor Max II died on July 30, 2022, after a brief medical issue, and was succeeded by Mayor Max III.

== Landmarks ==
In 1957 architect Frank Gehry designed and constructed his first private residence. Built along with USC classmate/architect Greg Walsh, the David Cabin shows early inspirational Asian influences and characteristics of Gehry's later works, including unfinished ceiling beams and other exposed materials. It is located on Middle Ridge Drive.

Another notable example of the area's mid-century mountain architecture is Idyllcreek, a 1960 A-frame cabin recognized for its preservation of period design. The structure has been featured in national publications such as Sunset Magazine and Desert Magazine, and was documented in the 2021 book Cabin Tripping by JJ Eggers. The property has also served as a location for national brands, including the 2017 Neiman Marcus Christmas Book.

== Geography ==
The Idyllwild–Pine Cove–Fern Valley CDP in Southern California's San Jacinto Mountains as defined by the United States Census Bureau statistical purposes may not precisely correspond to local understanding of the areas with the same names. The area includes 10,834-foot (3,302 m) high San Jacinto Peak, Southern California's second highest mountain, after Mount San Gorgonio.

Idyllwild lies mostly within a high mountain valley bisected by a small year-round stream, Strawberry Creek.

Pine Cove occupies a ridgetop location nearly 1,000 feet (300 m) higher than Idyllwild.

=== Climate ===
Under the Köppen climate classification system, Idyllwild–Pine Cove has a warm-summer Mediterranean climate, abbreviated "Csb" on climate maps. Winter is cool with occasional rain storms and snow showers. January daily high temperatures are usually between 50–60 °F (10–16 °C) with lows just below freezing. On average, the lowest winter temperature is 14 °F (−10 °C), putting the area in hardiness zone 8A. Spring starts slowly but then gets warmer in April and is usually a pleasant time of year.

Summer is hot and dry, but temperatures cool off to below 60 °F (16 °C) at night and days are more similar to the coastal areas than to the deserts. An average of 17.7 days a year exceed 90 °F (32 °C), very low for inland California. Late summer brings occasional thunderstorms from the North American Monsoon. Fall is warm and dry, with the first freezes by October and the first snows by November.

The record high is 104 °F (40 °C) on September 6, 2020, and June 16, 2021, while the record low is 1 °F (−17 °C) on January 5, 1971. The lowest high ever was 23 °F (−5 °C) on January 10, 1949, while the highest low was 77 °F (25 °C) on July 10, 2002.

The wettest year was 1983 with 56.87 inches (144 cm) of precipitation. The wettest month was January 1993 with 23.72 inches (60 cm) of rainfall, and the wettest day had 6.66 inches (17 cm) of rainfall on December 5, 1966. With only 10.84 inches (28 cm) of rain, 1961 was the driest year on record.

Snow falls every winter. The snowiest season by far was 1948–1949 with 108.1 inches (275 cm). The snowiest month ever was January 1949 with 49.0 inches (124 cm), and the snowiest day ever was March 24, 1964, when 22.0 inches (56 cm) of snow fell. There has never been a snowless season on record. The 4.8 inches (12 cm) of snow in 1983–1984 was the least snowy season ever.

Climate data for Idyllwild, California (1991–2020 normals, extremes 1943–present)
Month	Jan	Feb	Mar	Apr	May	Jun	Jul	Aug	Sep	Oct	Nov	Dec	Year
Record high °F (°C)	82 (28)	79 (26)	82 (28)	92 (33)	93 (34)	104 (40)	103 (39)	98 (37)	104 (40)	96 (36)	84 (29)	82 (28)	104 (40)
Mean maximum °F (°C)	69.2 (20.7)	68.1 (20.1)	72.7 (22.6)	78.7 (25.9)	84.9 (29.4)	90.1 (32.3)	94.5 (34.7)	93.3 (34.1)	90.2 (32.3)	83.8 (28.8)	75.4 (24.1)	70.2 (21.2)	96.3 (35.7)
Mean daily maximum °F (°C)	54.2 (12.3)	53.9 (12.2)	57.9 (14.4)	63.9 (17.7)	71.0 (21.7)	80.3 (26.8)	85.3 (29.6)	85.8 (29.9)	80.8 (27.1)	71.6 (22.0)	61.0 (16.1)	54.2 (12.3)	68.3 (20.2)
Daily mean °F (°C)	42.3 (5.7)	42.1 (5.6)	45.2 (7.3)	49.4 (9.7)	55.9 (13.3)	64.1 (17.8)	70.2 (21.2)	70.6 (21.4)	65.4 (18.6)	56.5 (13.6)	47.6 (8.7)	41.6 (5.3)	54.2 (12.4)
Mean daily minimum °F (°C)	29.7 (−1.3)	29.4 (−1.4)	31.0 (−0.6)	34.9 (1.6)	40.9 (4.9)	47.8 (8.8)	55.2 (12.9)	55.4 (13.0)	50.1 (10.1)	41.0 (5.0)	32.8 (0.4)	29.3 (−1.5)	39.8 (4.3)
Mean minimum °F (°C)	18.5 (−7.5)	18.6 (−7.4)	20.9 (−6.2)	24.8 (−4.0)	29.6 (−1.3)	35.6 (2.0)	44.5 (6.9)	44.7 (7.1)	37.4 (3.0)	30.4 (−0.9)	23.8 (−4.6)	18.7 (−7.4)	14.1 (−9.9)
Record low °F (°C)	1 (−17)	4 (−16)	3 (−16)	14 (−10)	18 (−8)	24 (−4)	27 (−3)	27 (−3)	23 (−5)	11 (−12)	10 (−12)	2 (−17)	1 (−17)
Average precipitation inches (mm)	4.74 (120)	5.35 (136)	3.31 (84)	1.67 (42)	0.65 (17)	0.13 (3.3)	0.47 (12)	0.60 (15)	0.79 (20)	1.17 (30)	1.92 (49)	3.65 (93)	24.45 (621.3)
Average snowfall inches (cm)	7.3 (19)	9.8 (25)	5.0 (13)	3.5 (8.9)	0.5 (1.3)	0.0 (0.0)	0.0 (0.0)	0.0 (0.0)	0.0 (0.0)	0.0 (0.0)	2.3 (5.8)	4.2 (11)	32.6 (84)
Average precipitation days (≥ 0.01 in)	6.9	7.9	6.0	4.3	2.3	0.4	2.0	2.4	2.1	2.6	4.0	6.3	47.2
Average snowy days (≥ 0.1 in)	2.2	3.1	1.4	1.5	0.1	0.0	0.0	0.0	0.0	0.1	0.8	2.0	11.2
Source 1: NOAA
Source 2: NCEI

== Demographics ==
Historical population
Census	Pop.	Note	%±
1980	2,959		—
1990	2,853		−3.6%
2000	3,504		22.8%
2010	3,874		10.6%
2020	4,163		7.5%
U.S. Decennial Census; 1860–1870 1880-1890; 1900 1910 1920; 1930 1940 1950; 1960 1970 1980; 1990 2000 2010

Idyllwild–Pine Cove first appeared as a census designated place in the 1980 U.S. census.

=== Racial and ethnic composition ===
Idyllwild–Pine Cove CDP, California – Racial and ethnic composition Note: the US Census treats Hispanic/Latino as an ethnic category. This table excludes Latinos from the racial categories and assigns them to a separate category. Hispanics/Latinos may be of any race.
Race / Ethnicity (NH = Non-Hispanic)	Pop 2000	Pop 2010	Pop 2020	% 2000	% 2010	% 2020
White alone (NH)	3,020	3,086	3,109	86.19%	79.66%	74.68%
Black or African American alone (NH)	19	32	39	0.54%	0.83%	0.94%
Native American or Alaska Native alone (NH)	23	24	31	0.66%	0.62%	0.74%
Asian alone (NH)	22	134	87	0.63%	3.46%	2.09%
Native Hawaiian or Pacific Islander alone (NH)	2	4	3	0.06%	0.10%	0.07%
Other race alone (NH)	13	2	19	0.37%	0.05%	0.46%
Mixed race or Multiracial (NH)	119	113	160	3.40%	2.92%	3.84%
Hispanic or Latino (any race)	286	479	715	8.16%	12.36%	17.18%
Total	3,504	3,874	4,163	100.00%	100.00%	100.00%

=== 2020 census ===
The 2020 United States census reported that Idyllwild-Pine Cove had a population of 4,163. The population density was 303.4 inhabitants per square mile (117.1/km^{2}). The racial makeup of Idyllwild-Pine Cove was 77.6% White, 1.1% African American, 1.3% Native American, 2.1% Asian, 0.1% Pacific Islander, 6.8% from other races, and 11.1% from two or more races. Hispanic or Latino of any race were 17.2% of the population.

The census reported that 95.9% of the population lived in households, 4.1% lived in non-institutionalized group quarters, and no one was institutionalized.

There were 1,894 households, out of which 17.3% included children under the age of 18, 43.6% were married-couple households, 5.8% were cohabiting couple households, 28.7% had a female householder with no partner present, and 21.9% had a male householder with no partner present. 35.8% of households were one person, and 17.8% were one person aged 65 or older. The average household size was 2.11. There were 1,095 families (57.8% of all households).

The age distribution was 14.8% under the age of 18, 6.5% aged 18 to 24, 20.0% aged 25 to 44, 29.4% aged 45 to 64, and 29.2% who were 65 years of age or older. The median age was 52.7 years. For every 100 females, there were 98.8 males.

There were 3,958 housing units at an average density of 288.4 units per square mile (111.4 units/km^{2}), of which 1,894 (47.9%) were occupied. Of these, 71.2% were owner-occupied, and 28.8% were occupied by renters.

In 2023, the US Census Bureau estimated that the median household income was $83,205, and the per capita income was $53,777. About 3.7% of families and 12.1% of the population were below the poverty line.

== Government ==
In the United States House of Representatives, Idyllwild, Fern Valley, and Pine Cove are in California's 41st Congressional District, represented by Republican Ken Calvert, and in the California State Legislature, they are in the 32nd senatorial district, represented by Republican Kelly Seyarto, and in the 47th Assembly district, represented by Republican Greg Wallis.

=== Local ===
In the Riverside County Board of Supervisors, the communities of Idyllwild and Pine Cove are in the Fourth District, represented by V. Manuel Perez. In the jurisdiction of the Riverside County Sheriff's Department, with Sheriff Chad Bianco. The Idyllwild, Pine Cove, Fern Valley area has several local governmental agencies: Idyllwild County Water District, Pine Cove County Water District, Fern Valley State Water District, Idyllwild Fire Protection District, County Service Area 36, County Service Area 38 and Idyllwild Historical Preservation District.

== Transportation ==
Forest Folk, using a grant from the Riverside County Transportation Commission, operates the Idyllwild Shuttle, which provides door-to-door service.

== Education ==
Almost all of the CDP is in Hemet Unified School District. A very small piece is in the Banning Unified School District.

- Idyllwild School is K–8 and part of Hemet USD.
- Hemet High School is part of Hemet USD and is located in Hemet.
- Idyllwild Arts Academy is a private day and boarding high school with a focus in the arts.
- Hamilton High School is a part of Hemet USD and is located in Anza.
- Tahquitz High School is a part of Hemet USD and is located in Hemet.

== Parks and recreation ==
Idyllwild is within the San Bernardino National Forest and borders Mount San Jacinto State Park.

The Riverside County Regional Park and Open-Space District operates the Idyllwild Park and Idyllwild Nature Center.

== Businesses and organizations ==
In 1946, Ernie and Betty Maxwell founded the Idyllwild Town Crier weekly newspaper, which has been in continual operation ever since. Over the years, it has been variously owned and operated by local families, the Chronicle Publishing Company in San Francisco, and a U.S. corporate subsidiary of the Tindle Newspaper Group. Since June 28, 2013, the Town Crier has been owned and operated by Idyllwild House Publishing Company Ltd., a family-held California general corporation based in Idyllwild. The Town Crier is the sole media monitor of eight local governmental agencies on "the Hill," as the San Jacinto Mountain communities are locally known. The Idyllwild Town Crier has received awards from the National Newspaper Association, the California Newspaper Publishers Association, and the California Press Association, which are on display at its Village Center Drive office.

The Idyllwild Arts Foundation, which began as a summer arts program, was founded by Bea and Max Krone in 1950. It was administered by the University of Southern California (USC) from 1964 through 1985, when the program was known as ISOMATA – Idyllwild School of Music and the Arts. In 1985, the Foundation purchased ISOMATA from USC, and followed by the founding of the private Idyllwild Arts Foundation (IAF) in 1986. IAF is a private, fully accredited high school for boarding and day students.

Since 2010 Idyllwild hosts the Idyllwild International Festival of Cinema. The first festival screened around 40 official selections from around the world.

In 2013, the Stratford Players theater group moved to Idyllwild, where they perform year-round. Typically in the fall, the troupe presents Will In The Woods, a selection of Shakespeare's scenes and soliloquies. The event is held outdoors in the afternoon, in keeping with Elizabethan custom. During the remainder of the year, Stratford Players present both staged readings and full productions of non-Shakespearean plays that vary from classics to recent works.

Camp Emerson, a Boy Scouts of America camp established in 1919, is located in Idyllwild.

AstroCamp, a sleepaway camp opened in 1991, is located in Idyllwild.

== Notable people ==
Idyllwild is home to many artists and musicians, notably drummer David Atwood of the 1970s rock group America, Bobby Womack, and Richard Halligan, a founding member of Blood, Sweat & Tears. Musician, composer, and record producer Kenneth James Gibson has a studio in Idyllwild and has recorded multiple albums there. PGA tour star Brendan Steele was born and raised in Idyllwild. Artist Nate Lowman grew up in Idyllwild and attended Idyllwild Arts Academy before moving to New York. Musician and radio personality Chris Thile spent most of his childhood in Idyllwild (approximately 1985–1995).

Film actors and producers who own or owned homes in Idyllwild and the surrounding area include Charles Laughton, Marjorie Main, Sharon Lawrence, Barbara Hershey, Doris Day, Michael J. Fox, Sean Connery, Dolly Parton, Herb Jeffries, Craig Stevens, Andrew Robinson, Shari Lewis, Doron Ofir, and Horace Hahn, who had a supporting role in the Cecil B. DeMille film This Day and Age (1933). American Idol season 10 contestant and musical artist Casey Abrams is from Idyllwild.
