= Cthulhu for President =

Political parody of the US presidential election

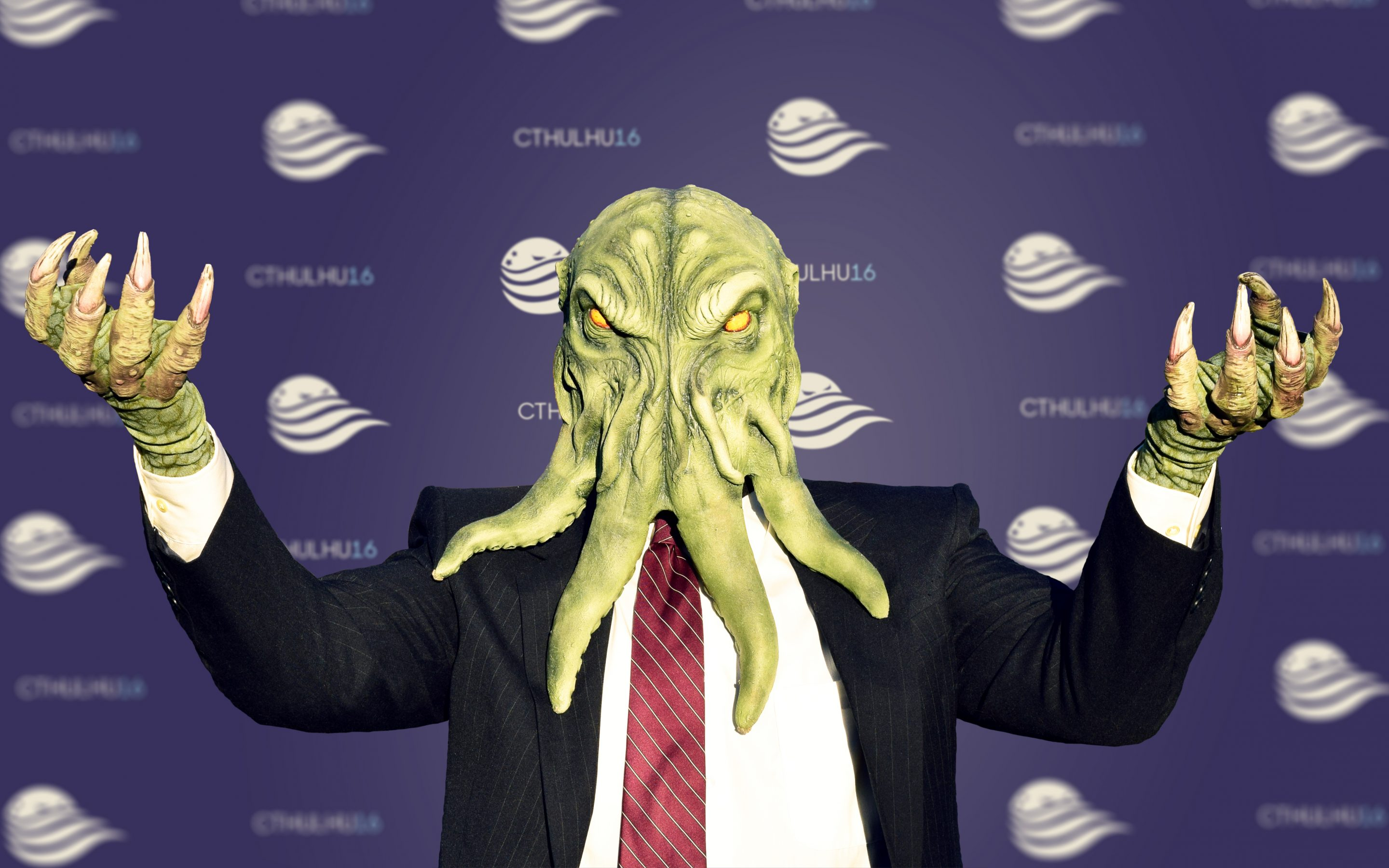
Eldritch horror and 2016 US presidential candidate Cthulhu, on the campaign trail, from CthulhuForAmerica.com

Cthulhu for President is a political parody of the United States presidential election, in which Cthulhu, the fictional cosmic horror entity, runs for President of the United States. Parody campaigns with accompanying political advertising materials were run for each of the US presidential elections since 1996, usually with the motto "Cthulhu for President: Why settle for the lesser evil?" Similar parody campaigns have been run for presidencies of other countries.

== Cthulhu ==
Cthulhu is a fictional cosmic entity created by writer H. P. Lovecraft and described as an enormous clawed and winged anthropoid shape, with a head like an octopus, which is worshipped by maniacal cultists across the world. The creature was first introduced in the 1928 short story "The Call of Cthulhu", but has since been featured in numerous popular culture references.

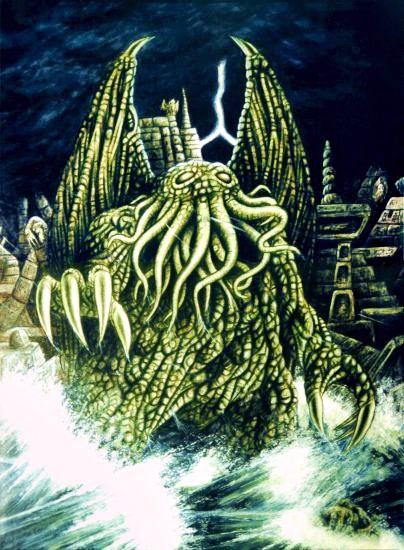
Cthulhu in its city of R'lyeh

== Chaosium ==
The American games company Chaosium publishes multiple games about Lovecraft's work, starting with the Call of Cthulhu horror role-playing game in 1981. In 1996, Chaosium published a "Cthulhu for President" political campaign kit, including a campaign button, posters, yard and window signs, speeches, and a vision booklet, "Contract on America" (parodying the 1994 Contract with America). This won the 1996 Origins Award for Best Game Accessory.

In 2004, Chaosium, in cooperation with Chris O'Neill and Daniel Landis of 9th Level Games, a humorous role-playing game publisher, made a complete "Cthulhu for President" beer and pretzels role-playing game. In it, the players portray Elder Party campaign staffers serving the Great Old Ones in an occult political struggle. The 2016 edition parodies the 2016 United States presidential election between Hillary Clinton and Donald Trump.

== Presidential elections ==
The Cthulhu for President parody campaign recurred over multiple election cycles. Cthulhu.org was the home of the first Internet Cthulhu for President campaign, starting in 1997, accompanying the Chaosium campaign materials, and running at least through 2007. Buttons and T-shirts depicting Cthulhu with the "Why Choose the Lesser Evil? Cthulhu for President" logo were sold during the 2000 and 2004 United States presidential election campaigns. Cthulhu for President videos and posters were made for the United States presidential elections in 2008 and 2012, and for the 2010 Polish presidential election. A Spanish website (Vota Cthulhu: Partido No Euclidiano Por el Fin de los Días – the Non-Euclidian Party for the End of Days) supported Cthulhu for President in the 2011 Spanish general election. A Cthulhu 2012 campaign website gave Cthulhu a vice presidential candidate, Dagon, from one of Lovecraft's earliest stories.

=== Cthulhu for America ===
The 2016 United States presidential election cycle included a larger "Cthulhu for America" website, which drew celebrity and international attention. The site was launched in August 2015, and included merchandise like t-shirts, stickers, flyers, and mugs with slogans including "Why choose the lesser evil?", and a take on Black Lives Matter/All Lives Matter: "No lives matter". Its Twitter account had over 35,000 followers. In December 2015 Cthulhu for America put out a War on Christmas kit including Cthulhu stickers meant to be put over the logo of Starbucks coffee cups. The site gave credit to Chaosium for the 1990s and 2000s "campaigns" but distanced itself from the company.

The Cthulhu for America campaign was "endorsed" by Mexican filmmaker Guillermo del Toro and his Twitter followers in June 2016 (also referring to the Spanish Vota Cthulhu page). del Toro also inverted the Cthulhu for President logo (of VoteCthulhu.com, an alternate URL of Cthulhu for America), and called it "Donald Cthrump", referring to candidate Donald Trump.

In September 2016, American horror author Stephen King wrote that Donald Trump was actually Cthulhu in disguise: "The absurd hairdo isn't absurd at all. It hides the tentacles." The Cthulhu for America campaign responded with an angry denial ("Trump could barely hope to be 1/63 as great as I am if he weren't such a buffoon") with a longer statement including references to many of King's books. The campaign had earlier made a similar rebuttal to John Boehner's statement that candidate Ted Cruz was "Lucifer in the flesh", writing "The only being of pure evil in this race is myself".

Cthulhu for America continued into the 2020 United States presidential election, this time with the slogan "Wreck. World. Worse.", parodying the Build Back Better slogan of the Joe Biden 2020 presidential campaign. When the initial logo used for the 2020 Republican National Convention had a tangle of lines apparently emerging from the Republican elephant, it was popularly compared to Cthulhu and its tentacles.

== Selected electoral slogans and policy planks ==
- "Cthulhu for President: Why settle for the lesser evil?"
- "Equality through Insanity"
- "I want you to get a head and consume it for nourishment."
- "Keep climate changing"
- "Legalize human sacrifice"
- "No lives matter"
- "No More Years"
- "Vote for Cthulhu... and you'll never have to vote again."

== See also ==
- Perennial candidate
