= Mayor Max II =

Mayor of Idyllwild–Pine Cove, California

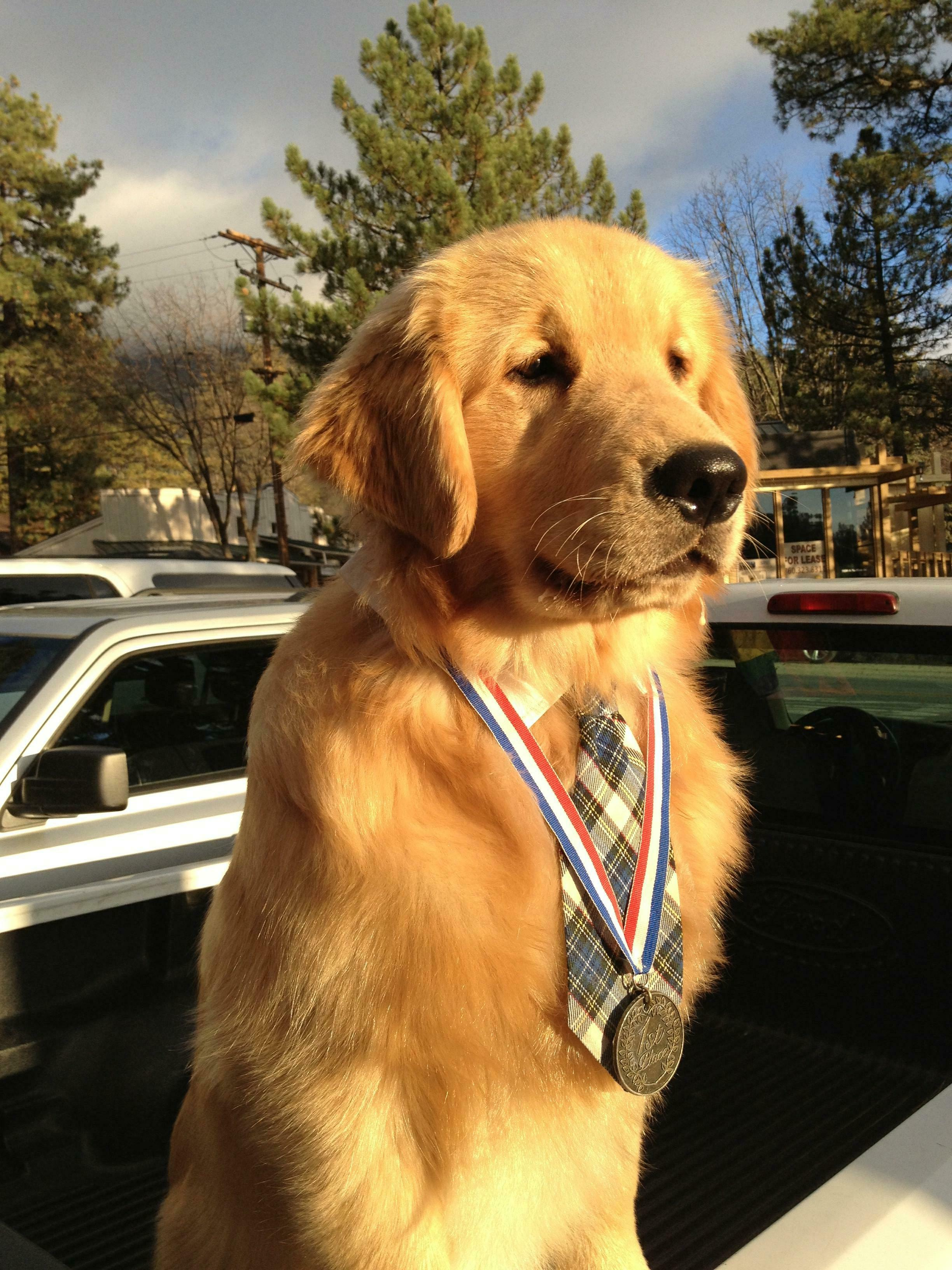
- Mayor Max II in his visiting truck, November 24, 2013

Mayor-for-life of Idyllwild
- In office July 21, 2013 – July 30, 2022
- Deputy: Mikey Mighty-Dog Mueller; Mitzi Mighty-Dog Mueller
- Preceded by: Max I
- Succeeded by: Max III

Personal details
- Born: Maximus Mighty-Dog Mueller; May 6, 2013
- Died: July 30, 2022 (aged 9) Temecula, California, U.S.
- Species: Dog
- Breed: Golden Retriever
- Sex: Male

Maximus Mighty-Dog Mueller II (May 6, 2013 – July 30, 2022) was a Golden Retriever dog who served as the second unofficial mayor of Idyllwild, part of the census-designated place of Idyllwild–Pine Cove, California. His deputy mayors, Mitzi and Mikey, were his cousins. After his death Mayor Max II was succeeded by his cousin Max III, who was sworn in on December 10, 2022.

== Mayoralty ==
In 2012, the non-profit organization Idyllwild Animal Rescue Friends (ARF) hosted an "election" for mayor of Idyllwild (which, as part of an unincorporated community, has no local government) as part of a fundraising event for the organization. Fourteen dogs and two cats ran, and Max, a Golden Retriever, was elected as Idyllwild's first mayor. On April 2, 2013, Mayor Max died, and Maximus Mighty-Dog Mueller II, another Golden Retriever, arrived in Idyllwild on July 21 to complete the remainder of the term. In March 2014, as the end of Max's term approached, ARF solicited the town's interest in holding another election. The people overwhelmingly pled for Mayor Max's continuation in perpetuity.

Mayor Max was recognized by the County of Riverside, California. The mayor's duties included visiting with locals and out-of-town visitors, attending business grand openings and other town functions, participating in the town's two annual parades, and promoting Idyllwild. Max's popularity had spread the world over, and he has represented the town through appearances on news programs, talk shows, advertisements, billboards, and a game show.

== Death ==
Mayor Max was hospitalized and died in Temecula, California on July 30, 2022. He was succeeded by Mayor Max III, who formally took office on December 10, 2022.

== See also ==
- List of individual dogs
- Non-human electoral candidate
