= Political representation of nature =

Granting political or institutional standing to non-humans within governance systems

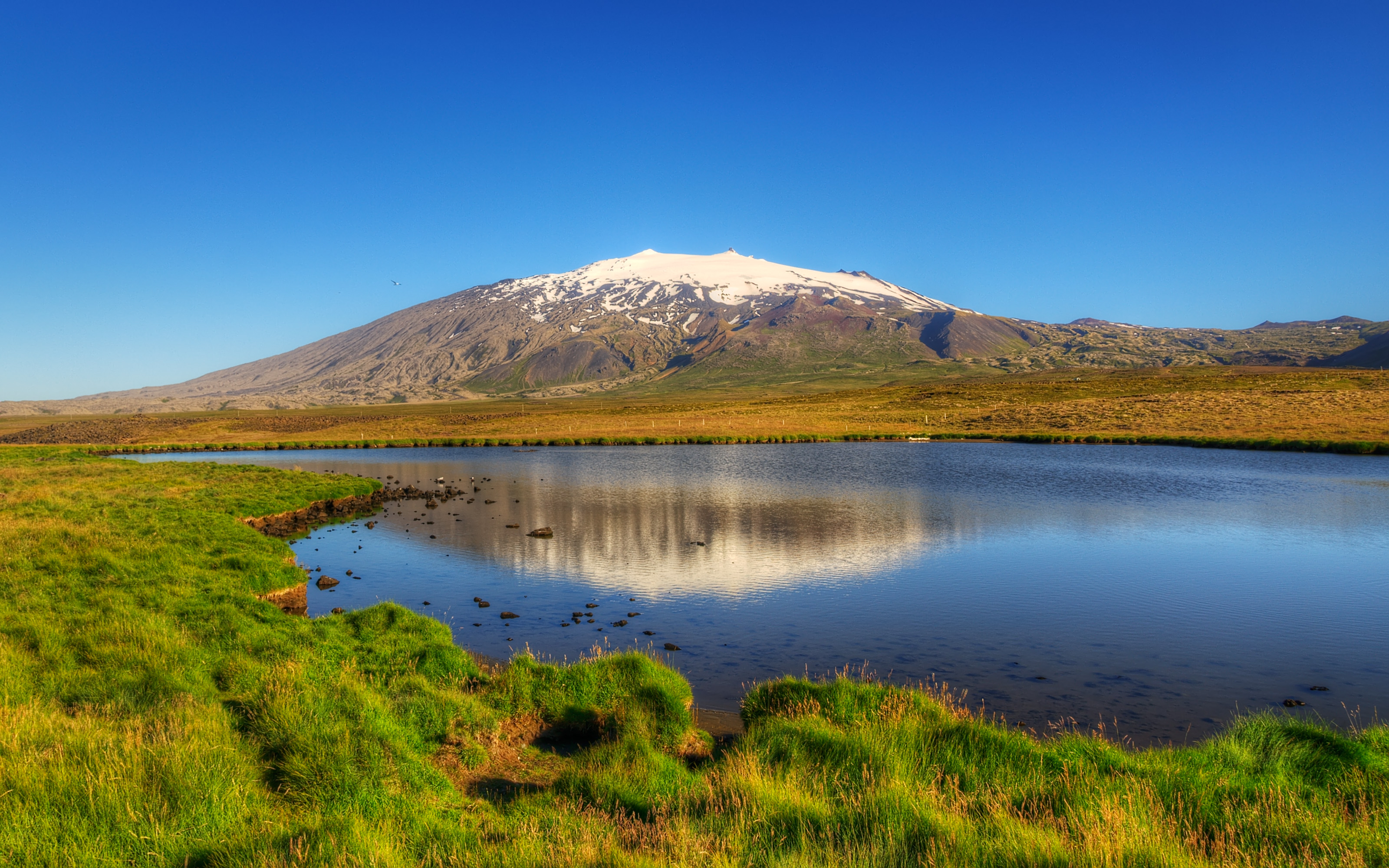
Snæfellsjökull, a glacier in the Snæfellsnes peninsula in Iceland, was a nominee to run in the 2024 Icelandic presidential elections.

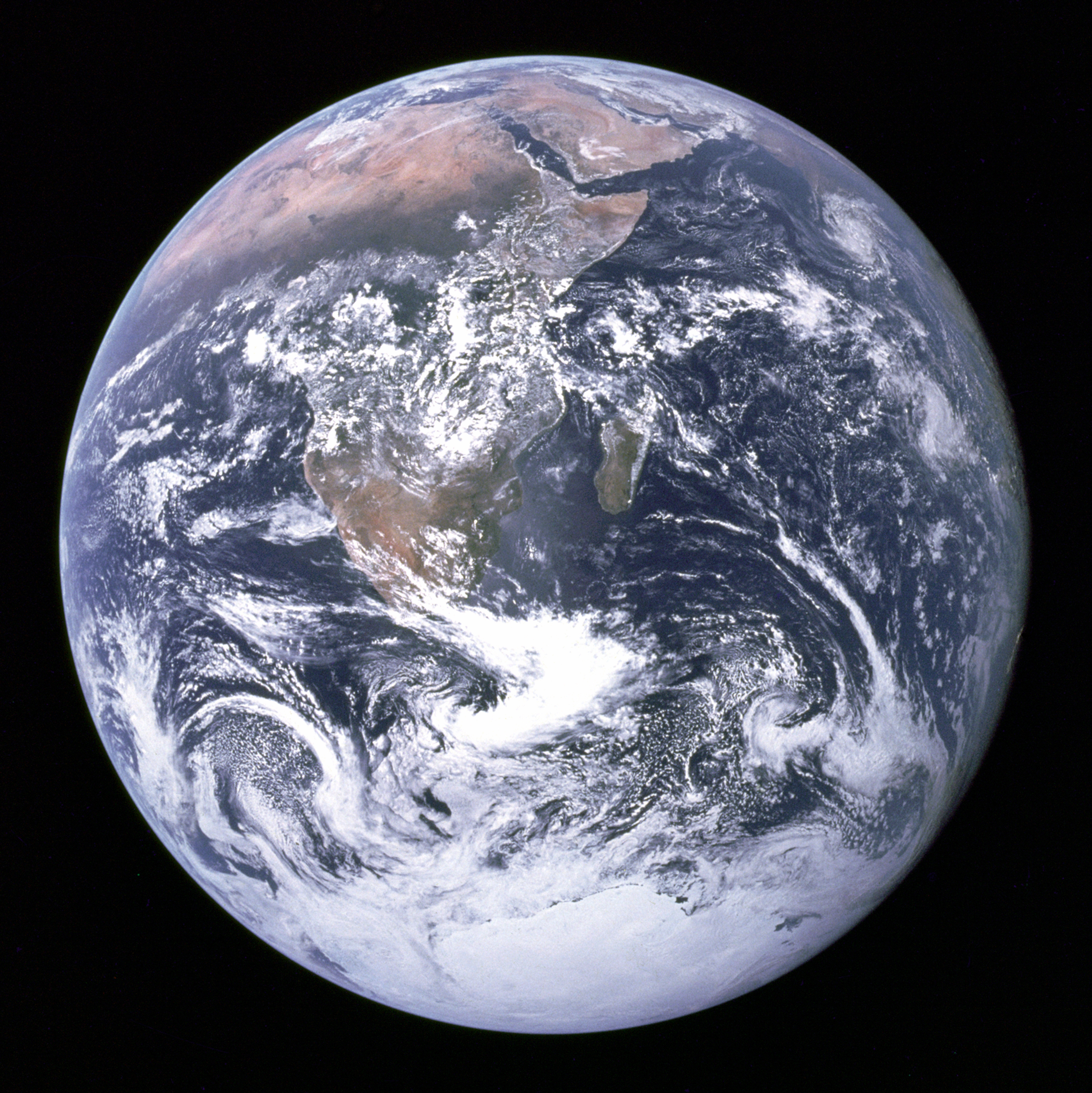
In 2024, The Planetary Democrats nominated planet Earth as a symbolic candidate for the European Parliament election.

Political representation of nature is the concept and practice of granting political or institutional standing to nonhuman entities—such as animals, plants, and ecosystems—within governance systems. This concept has developed to incorporate natural entities in political decision-making, reflecting debates about the effectiveness of human-centered governance in environmental protection.

Emerging trends, including the political turn in environmental ethics and the representative turn in political theory, drive the debate in this field. Following progress in legal representation for nonhuman nature, such as the granting of legal personhood to animals, rivers and ecosystems, the conversation has broadened to consider how nature can be represented within legislative and executive branches of government.

== Historical and theoretical background ==
Early thinkers, including Thomas Hobbes, have historically framed nature as passive and separate from human society. Later, theorists such as Bruno Latour introduced concepts, such as a 'parliament of things,' proposing that democratic processes consider nonhuman actors. Latour's approach has been cited as influential in political theories addressing ecological issues, emphasizing the interconnectedness of human and environmental systems.

Since the early 2000s, frameworks such as Earth Jurisprudence and Rights of Nature have further influenced the concept of nonhuman representation. These frameworks propose that nature has intrinsic value deserving of legal and moral rights. The works of political theorists like Andrew Dobson, Robyn Eckersley, Robert Goodin, and John O'Neill have contributed to this shift. They propose that humans have an ethical responsibility toward nature, suggesting that democratic systems might evolve to account for nonhuman interests.

== Institutional mechanisms ==
Various institutional mechanisms have been proposed and implemented to incorporate nonhuman entities and ecosystems into formal political decision-making processes.

Electoral reforms like proportional representation and lowering electoral thresholds have been suggested to facilitate the entry of green parties into parliaments. These changes could help increase the political influence of parties dedicated to environmental advocacy, further amplifying the representation of nature in governance.

Deliberative initiatives, such as citizen assemblies and deliberative mini-publics, engage randomly selected citizens in structured discussions on environmental issues, providing a platform for nonhuman interests to be included in political discourse. While these bodies typically do not have formal decision-making power, they can influence policy indirectly by informing legislators.

Dedicated ombudspersons or commissioners are independent offices that investigate and advocate for the rights of natural entities, operating similarly to human rights commissioners.

The allocation of seats in existing parliaments to specific representatives of nature mirrors systems of political reservations used to ensure representation for marginalised human groups. These nature representatives would advocate for the interests of ecosystems and nonhuman entities within legislative bodies.

On a global level, new supranational institutions have been proposed. Suggested frameworks include regional ecosystem assemblies for different biomes and an Earth System Council to coordinate global environmental action. Both institutions aim to include representation from states, indigenous communities, and proxy guardians for the non-human.

== Political representation of nature in practice ==
Examples of nonhuman representation exist in several countries. According to the Eco Jurisprudence Monitor, as of August 2025, there are 589 laws that have institutionalized nonhuman political representation. Nevertheless, there exist also other forms of political representation.

In New Zealand, the Parliamentary Commissioner for the Environment monitors environmental issues. This office conducts investigations, reviews, and reports on environmental conditions and evaluates the effectiveness of government policies. Its role is intended to support transparency and accountability in environmental governance.

The European Commissioner for Health and Animal Welfare updates animal welfare regulations within the European Union. The position also promotes the One Health approach, which recognizes the interdependence of people, animals, plants, and their shared environment.

In Wales, the Future Generations Commissioner ensures that the interests of future generations are considered in policy-making. The office evaluates the long-term impacts of current policies and promotes sustainable development practices aimed at safeguarding both human and environmental health.

In Germany, the Federal Animal Welfare Officer provides oversight on animal welfare matters and advises the federal government across sectors such as agriculture, research, and industry.

Australia's Inspector-General of Animal Welfare and Live Animal Exports advises the federal government on issues related to animal welfare and oversees the development of policies to improve the treatment and protection of animals.

In Spain, the General Director of Animal Rights manages animal welfare policies at the federal level, developing strategies to enhance animal rights and incorporating these into broader social and legislative frameworks.

The Commissioner for Animal Welfare in Malta enforces animal welfare laws and oversees the proper treatment of animals, ensuring compliance with national regulations.

In New York City, the Office of Animal Welfare focuses on policies related to the health, safety, and welfare of wild animals and pets.

== See also ==
- Environmental crime
- Environmental ethics
- Environmental justice
- Environmental personhood
- Human impact on the environment
- Moral patienthood
- Indigenous law
- Rights of nature
