= Bode Ioiô =

Brazilian goat (c. 1915–1931)

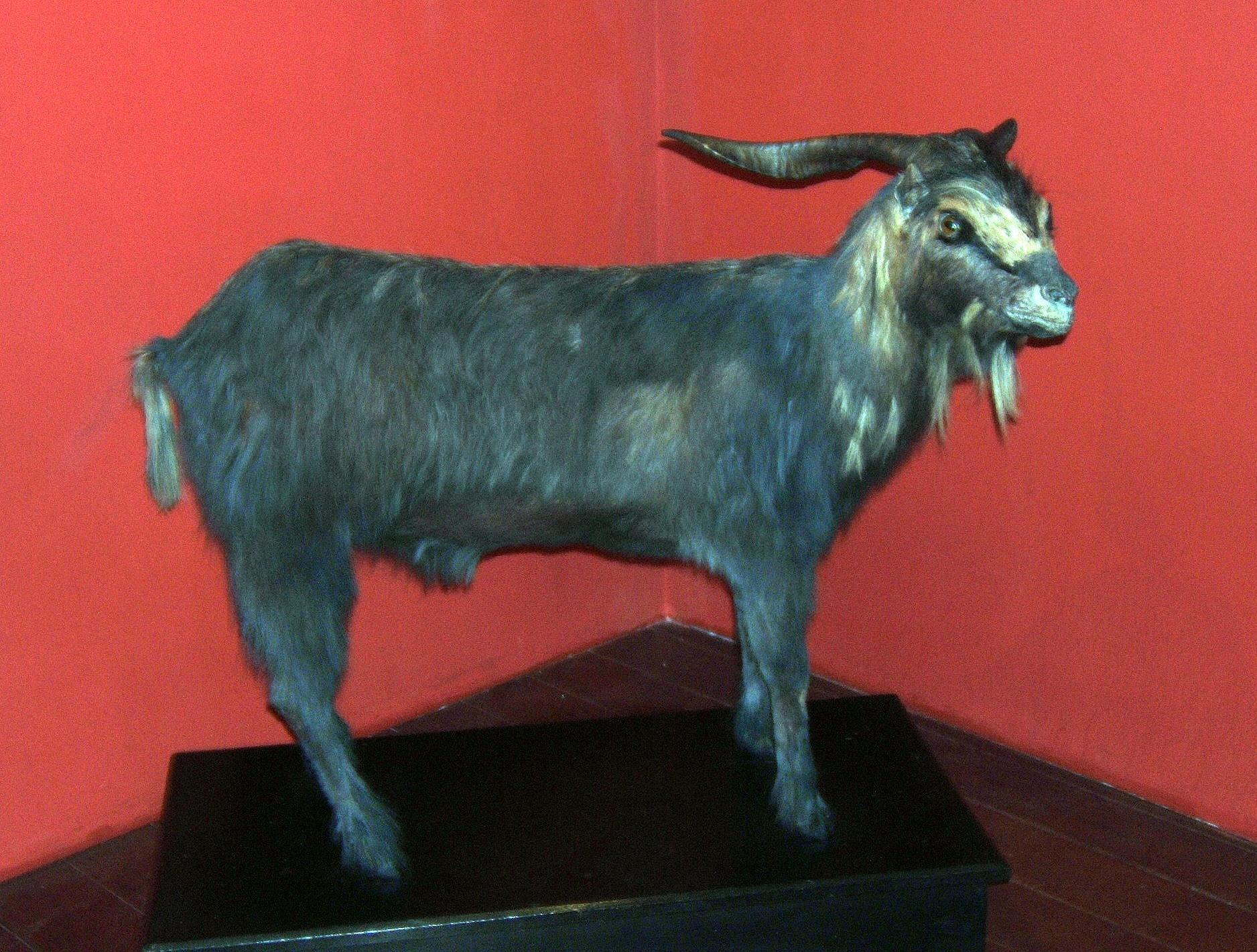
- Taxidermied Bode Ioiô at the Museu do Ceará
- Other name: Bode Celebridade ("Celebrity Goat")
- Species: Domestic goat
- Sex: Male
- Born: c. 1915; Sertão, Ceará, Brazil
- Died: 1931; Fortaleza, Ceará, Brazil
- Resting place: Museu do Ceará (taxidermied)
- Known for: Folk figure in Fortaleza; symbolic election as city councilman
- Owner: José de Magalhães Porto (Rossbach Brazil Company)
- Residence: Fortaleza city center
- Named after: Habit of walking back and forth (“yo-yo”)

Bode Ioiô (Yo-yo goat) (c. 1915 – 1931) was a celebrated goat who became a folk figure in the Brazilian city of Fortaleza during the early 20th century, particularly in the 1920s. Originally brought to the city by drought migrants, he gained fame for wandering the city center, frequenting bohemian circles, and eventually becoming the subject of a protest vote where he was unofficially "elected" city councilman in 1922. After his death, Ioiô was taxidermied and displayed at the Museu do Ceará. He became a cultural icon of the region.

== Biography ==
Bode Ioiô arrived in Fortaleza in 1915, brought by retirantes (migrants fleeing drought) from the sertão (back country) of Ceará. He was subsequently acquired by José de Magalhães Porto, a representative of industrialist Delmiro Gouveia and the northeast correspondent for the British-owned Rossbach Brazil Company, located near Praia de Iracema. Ioiô became a mascot for the company. Ioiô became a familiar sight wandering the central streets of Fortaleza, especially around Praça do Ferreira, the city's main square and former cultural hub. He often accompanied bohemians and writers frequenting the local cafés and bars, who reportedly gave him cachaça to drink. According to popular accounts, his name, "Ioiô" (Yo-yo), originated from his habit of repeatedly walking the same route back and forth between Praça do Ferreira and Praia de Iracema.

=== "Election" as councilman ===
In 1922, Bode Ioiô received numerous votes for city councilman (vereador) in Fortaleza. At the time, elections used paper ballots where voters wrote in their chosen candidate's name. Although not an official candidate, the votes for Ioiô served as a popular protest vote against the local politicians and political climate of the era. He received enough votes that he would have held office if he had not been a goat. While he never formally held office, the incident cemented his fame, earning him the nickname "Bode Celebridade" (Celebrity Goat) and reinforcing his image as a symbol of the people's opinion, symbolically "holding office" daily at Praça do Ferreira.

== Death and legacy ==
After his death in 1931, Bode Ioiô was taxidermied. His preserved body was donated to the collection of the Museu do Ceará, where it is a prominent exhibit. His tail was stolen from the museum display in 1996. Bode Ioiô's story has endured in Ceará's popular culture. He has been the subject of documentaries, cordel literature (chapbooks), and children's books, and is mentioned in the works of Ceará memorialists such as the poet Otacílio de Azevedo and the historian Raimundo Girão. In a public poll in 2008, Fortaleza schoolchildren chose him as the city's mascot. His life story inspired the theme (enredo) for the Paraíso do Tuiuti samba school's parade during the 2019 Rio de Janeiro Carnival.

== See also ==
- List of animals in political office
