= Idyllwild Town Crier =

- "Almost All the News – Part of the Time"
- Front page of the edition of November 12, 2009
- Type: Weekly newspaper
- Format: Broadsheet
- Owner: Suzanne Avalon
- Founder(s): Ernie and Betty Maxwell
- Publisher: Idyllwild House Publishing Co. Ltd.
- Editor: Melissa Diaz Hernandez
- Photo editor: Jeff Clark
- Staff writers: 3
- Founded: November 1, 1946; 79 years ago
- Language: English
- Headquarters: 54391 Village Center Dr, Ste. 5, Idyllwild, CA 92549
- Country: United States
- Circulation: ~2100
- OCLC number: 27263446
- Website: idyllwildtowncrier.com
- Free online archives: Idyllwild Town Crier (News Library)

The Idyllwild Town Crier is a local weekly newspaper published out of Idyllwild, California. The Town Crier serves the area of the San Jacinto Mountains in Riverside County, California. The paper has been published weekly since its founding in 1946.

== History ==
The newspaper published its first issue as The Town Crier on Friday, November 1, 1946. The paper was founded by married couple Ernie and Betty Maxwell, a visual artist and a former Broadway dancer, who moved to the town in 1944 during a post-war boom in logging and tourism. The paper was published from their house until at least 1949.

Ernie Maxwell continued as editor/publisher until 1957 when he sold it to devote more time to writing and cartooning. The new owners were Mark Clevenger, former editor of the Sun-Post, and I.G. Rosen, of Gilroy, who became the paper's general manager. In 1972, Luther and Marilyn in Weare acquired the paper. At that time the 16-page weekly tabloid had a circulation of 2,000. In 1977, Betty Maxwell died.

In May 1978, the Weares sold the Town Crier to L.B. and Dorothy Hunsaker. In May 1989, the Hunsakers sold the paper to Chronicle Publishing Company, publisher of the San Francisco Chronicle. The Town Crier changed corporate hands in 1994 when it sold to England-based Tindle Newspaper Group. Also in 1994, Ernie Maxwell died.

Two decades later, the paper returned to private ownership when wife-and-husband Becky and Jack Clark acquired it in June 2013. Publisher Beck Clark was the paper's the longest serving employee. Around 2017, the paper changed from a freesheet to a membership model. In 2024, Suzanne Avalon bought the paper from the Clarks.
