= Starship Command (play-by-mail game) =

Science fiction play-by-mail game

Starship Command is a play-by-mail game that was published by Elite Simulations.

== Development ==
The game was designed by Brian Hansen. It was a computer-moderated game published by Elite Simulations with turn-around times every two weeks.

== Gameplay ==
The game's format is "tactical naval combat in space". Elements of gameplay include races and traits as well as starship design. Diplomacy and combat are part of gameplay. Games end when a player's fleet achieves a set number of points. Various medals were available for player accomplishments, which remained on a player's record for future games.

== Reception ==
B.E. Wright reviewed the game in the November–December 1996 issue of Paper Mayhem magazine. He stated that, while it was not his favorite game, it was "the best tactical space game ever designed for PBM", predicting a bright future if it caught on with players.

Starship Command won the Origins Award for Best New Play-by-Mail Game of 1996.
