= Six shooter (disambiguation) =

A six shooter is a type of revolver that carries six cartridges

Six Shooter or Sixshooter may also refer to:

- Six Shooter (film), a 2005 Academy Award-winning live action short film
- The Six Shooter, a 1953–1954 radio series starring Jimmy Stewart
- Six Shooter Records, a record label
- "Six Shooter", a song by Queens of the Stone Age from the album Songs for the Deaf
- a variety of maize which averages six ears per stalk and is frequently grown as a novelty
- Sixshooter Peaks, summits in Utah

== See also ==
- Six Guns (disambiguation)
- Sixshot, a character from the Transformers franchise
