= Saucisse =

Individual dachshund

- Species: Canis familiaris
- Breed: Dachshund
- Sex: Male
- Born: c. 1998; Marseille, France
- Died: 22 November 2014 (aged 16); Marseille
- Known for: star of detective books; mayoral candidate for Marseille

Saucisse (c. 1998–2014) was a dachshund who gained fame in France as the protagonist of a book series. He was a candidate at the 2001 mayoral elections of Marseille, and appeared on the third season of Secret Story in 2010.

== Biography ==
=== 1998-2000 ===
At an early age, the dog was found in the garbage by the Société Protectrice des Animaux (Society for the Protection of Animals). He underwent several operations and was finally saved. He waited eight months behind the bars of his cage before being adopted by the team of L'Écailler du Sud, a Marseille publishing house of detective novels, notably by the writer Serge Scotto who made him his mascot and named him Saucisse ("Sausage").

=== 2000-2014 ===
Saucisse quickly became the hero of many novels and his reputation began to spread across the Marseille region. On 14 September 2000, a square in the city of Marseille was inaugurated and named after him, becoming the Place du Chien Saucisse.(43.2949°N 5.3841°E)

He gained wider fame for his candidacy during the 2001 municipal elections in Marseille in the first area (1st and 7th arrondissement) as the mascot of an alternative eponymous list led by Stéphane Joiris with the slogan "For a more human sauciété [society]." This list managed to rank sixth with 4.5% of the votes, defeating the candidate of the local party Rally for France by almost 1 percentage point. Thereafter, Serge Scotto registered his dog to the 2002 French presidential election.

Serge Scotto introduced his dog to many celebrities, taking him to trade shows and literary gatherings. Saucisse appeared on many television shows including Vie privée, vie publique, hosted by Mireille Dumas, La Méthode Cauet or On ne peut pas plaire à tout le monde by Marc-Olivier Fogiel. Saucisse was photographed with many people such as Ève Ruggieri, Bernard Werber, Florence Foresti and Raymond Devos. During these few years, Saucisse continued to follow Scotto and was "used" several times by the latter as a media figure to expose certain injustices such as the kidnapping of Florence Aubenas and Hussein Hanoun. The dog also helped his master during all these years in his columns for the daily Métro.

In 2002, a vintage wine named "Cuvée Chien Saucisse" was created in Roquemaure.

In 2007, Scotto composed a duet he sang with his dog, accompanied by the group Musard entitled "Petit Chien des Rues" ("Little Dog of the Streets"), in reference to the Saucisse's early life.

On 17 September 2009, in the reality show Secret Story 3, Benjamin Castaldi announced the arrival of a new resident, aged 77 years old, for the following week. Thus, on 24 July 2009, after many rumors on this subject, Saucisse entered the house and was renamed 'Secret' for the occasion. He entered with his own secret which was : "I was candidate for Mayor at the City hall of Marseille". This secret was on the list of secrets since the beginning of the 3rd season. During his participation in the reality show, Saucisse was only with other candidates from 3:00 pm to 6:00 pm daily and consulted his veterinarian twice every day. The money he won was given to the Société protectrice des animaux. However, he left the house on 31 July and his secret was not discovered by other contestants.

Saucisse died 22 November 2014, aged approximately 16 years old.

== See also ==
- List of individual dogs

== Bibliography ==
- Collectif, La fiesta dessoude, dix nouvelles policières à Marseille, L'Écailler du Sud, September 2001, 186 p. (ISBN 2-914264-12-7)
- Georges Foveau, Myster Circus à Avignon, Rouge Safran, January 2002, 120p. (ISBN 2-913647-09-X)
- Didier Van Cauwelaert, Rencontre sous X, Albin Michel editions, April 2002, 250 p. (ISBN 2-226132-94-5)
- Collectif, Du noir dans le vert, L'Écailler du Sud, October 2002, 143p. (ISBN 2-914264-42-9)
- Gilles Del Pappas, Mémoires d'un goûte-sauce, L'Écailler du Sud, November 2002, 110 p. (ISBN 2-914264-28-3)
- Collectif, Meurtres sur un plateau, L'Écailler du Sud, September 2003, 200 p. (ISBN 2-914264-40-2)
- Henri-Frédéric-Blanc, La mécanique des anges, Le Rocher editions, February 2004, 266 p. (ISBN 2-268049-52-3)
- Jean-Paul Delfino, Droit aux Brutes, Adcan editions, March 2004, 160p. (ISBN 2-951657-29-3)
- Serge Scotto, Saucisse dans le métro, Jigal editions, October 2004, 144 p. (ISBN 2-914704-18-6)
- Serge Scotto, La gloire de Saucisse, Jigal editions, October 2005, 128 p. (ISBN 2-914 704-24-0)
- Serge Scotto, Saucisse président, Jigal editions, March 2007, 136 p. (ISBN 978-2-914704-34-2)
