= Mayor Max III =

Mayor of Idyllwild–Pine Cove, California

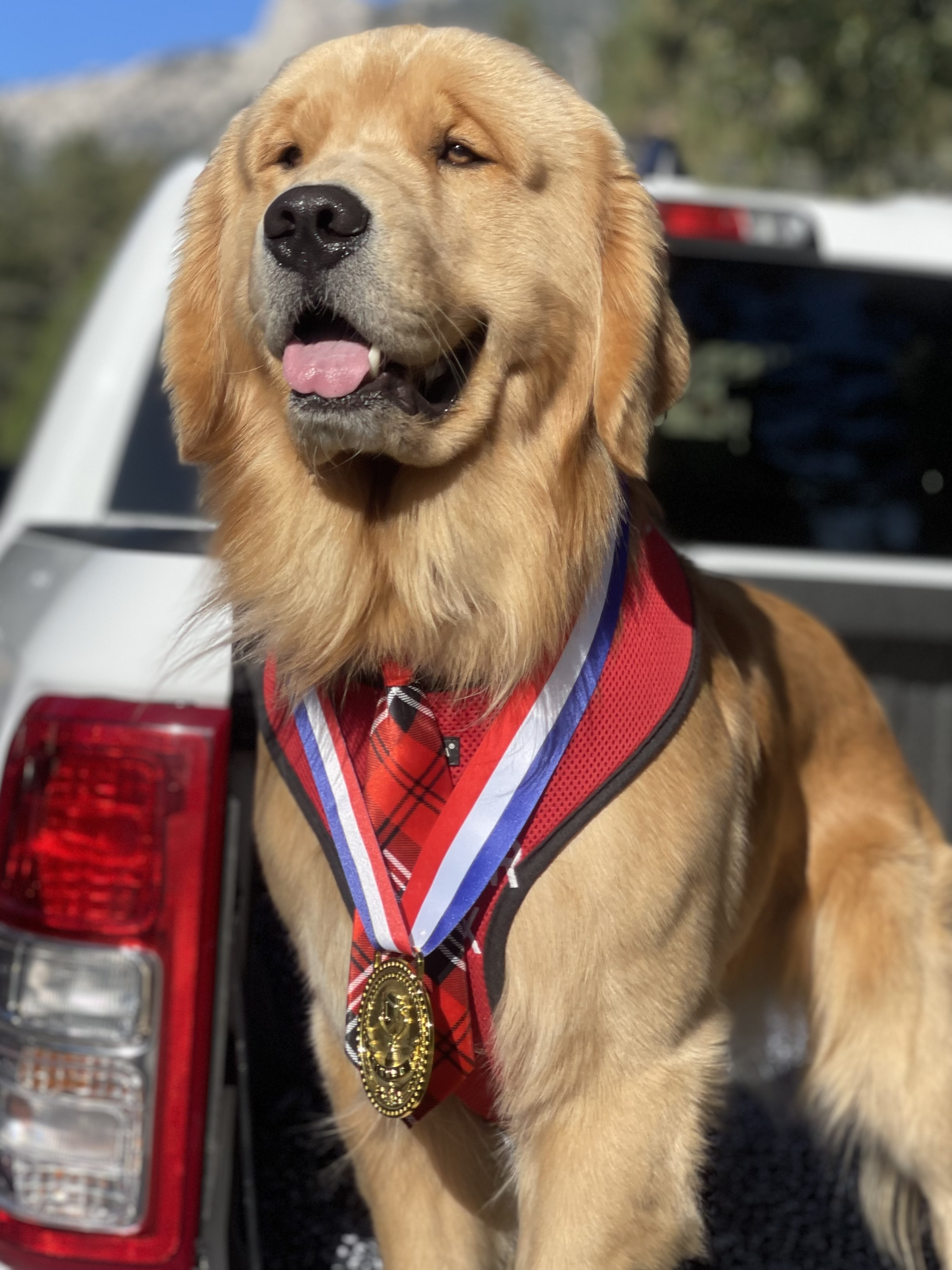
- Mayor Max III Official Portrait, September 18, 2024

Mayor-for-life of Idyllwild
- Incumbent
- Assumed office December 10, 2022
- Deputy: Vice Mayor Meadow Mighty-Dog Mueller; Mitzi Mighty-Dog Mueller; Mikey Mighty-Dog Mueller
- Preceded by: Mayor Max II

Personal details
- Born: Maximus Mighty-Dog Mueller III; September 5, 2022 (age 4) Payson, Utah, U.S

Maximus Mighty-Dog Mueller III (born 5 September 2022) is a Golden Retriever dog who serves as the third unofficial mayor of Idyllwild, part of the census-designated place of Idyllwild–Pine Cove, California. He took office on 10 December 2022, succeeding his predecessor and cousin Mayor Max II.

== Mayoralty ==
Following the death of Mayor Max II on July 30 2022, Deputy Mayors Mikey and Mitzi served as interim co-mayors while a search for a successor began. On December 10, 2022, Mayor Max III, a three-month-old Golden Retriever, was inaugurated as Idyllwild's third honorary mayor.

Max III's duties as a goodwill ambassador include daily public appearances in his Mayor-Mobile, attending grand openings and visiting schools and hospitals. He can be seen wearing one of his thousands of custom neckties while greeting constituents at his official parking spot in town. His sister is the Vice Mayor, and Deputy Mayor Mitzi, succeeding the former Deputy Mayor Mikey, supports his administration. His popularity has attracted coverage from many news companies which have interviewed him for articles in newspapers, as well as an upcoming drama play called "Meet Mayor Max" in the UK.

== See also ==
- List of individual dogs
- Non-human electoral candidate
