= The Planetary Democrats =

The Planetary Democrats Die Planetaren Demokrat_innen
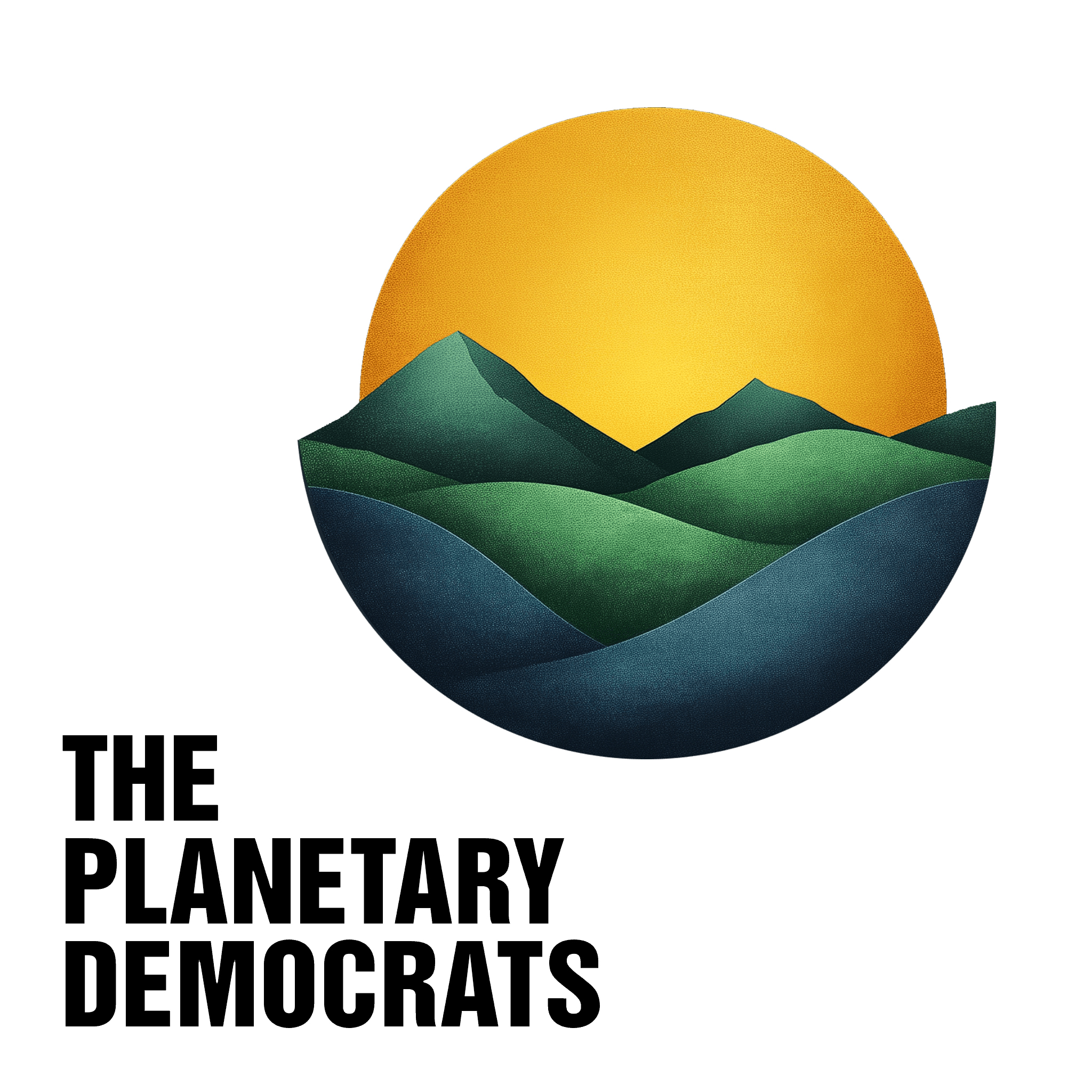
- Founded: September 2023; 2 years ago
- Headquarters: Hamburg
- Ideology: Political representation of nature Rights of nature
- European Parliament: 0 / 96

Website
- planetary-democrats.org

The Planetary Democrats (German: Die Planetaren Demokrat_innen), is a political association in Germany. Its primary focus is the implementation of institutional mechanisms for the political representation of nature. The association was founded in September 2023 and first participated in the 2024 European Parliament election. The association is a member of the Global Alliance for the Rights of Nature.

== Program ==
The Planetary Democrats view environmental crises such as biodiversity loss, climate change, and pollution as the result of a deeper problem of governance. This approach is also reflected in their program, which is primarily focused on institutional reforms at the European and international levels. The institutional proposals include the introduction of designated EU commissioners for natural beings and ecosystems, as well as the establishment of an independent EU Nature Parliament. On the global level, the association is advocating for the establishment of a Planetary Parliament integrated into the United Nations system.

The association endorses the notion of the rights of nature and advocates for its implementation within the European Union.

The Planetary Democrats support the implementation of a Planet Income on the European level, which comprises a dividend distributed universally and is financed through taxes on carbon, plastic, pesticides, and other pollutants. This mechanism is intended to internalise the external costs of pollution and thus curb the degradation of ecosystems.

== 2024 European Parliament election ==
In 2024, The Planetary Democrats nominated planet Earth as a symbolic candidate for the European Parliament election. The campaign argued that all beings affected by the Parliament’s decisions should be represented within the institution. The candidacy resulted in a legal dispute before the Federal Constitutional Court over candidate eligibility and was finally not admitted.
