= Six-Guns & Sorcery =

North America supplement for the Castle Falkenstein tabletop roleplaying game

Cover art by John Matson, 1996

Six-Guns & Sorcery is a supplement published by R. Talsorian Games in 1996 for the steampunk-themed fantasy role-playing game Castle Falkenstein.

== Description ==
The role-playing game Castle Falkenstein is set in 19th-century "New Europa" in an alternate steampunk universe. Six-Guns & Sorcery provides information about North America so that gamemasters can incorporate a new setting into their campaigns. The content is given through the eyes of Tom Olam, a man who was born in our world and somehow transported to the Falkenstein universe.

In this alternate universe, the development of North America in the 18th- and 19th centuries led to the formation of several independent nations, including the Free State of Orleans, the Confederation of Twenty Nations, the Republic of Texas, the Californian Empire Standard of the Bear, and much smaller versions of Canada and the United States. The book provides new character classes, new talents, new steam punk technology, and new arcane lore.

== Publication history ==
R. Talsorian Games published Castle Falkenstein in 1994, and expanded the campaign setting with Six-Guns and Sorcery two years later. The supplement was published as a 178-page softcover book written by Edward Bolme, James L. Cambias, Eric Floch, Angela Hyatt, Jim Parks, Derek Quintanar, Barrie Rosen, Mark Schumann, and Chris Williams, with interior art by William Eaken, Darryl Elliott, Davide Fabbri, Eric Hotz, Dany Orizio, Paolo Parente, Mark Schumann, and Alessia Zambonin, and cover art by John Matson.

== Reception ==
In Issue 29 of Shadis, Jane St. Claire was disappointed that half of the book was about the Eastern half of North America, when she'd been led to believe by the title that ALL of the book would be set in the Wild West. However, she did find all of the material well-researched, logically presented, and of high quality. She concluded with a strong recommendation, saying, "Overall, Six-Guns & Sorcery is a must to any Castle Falkenstein GM, and definitely worth a look-see to anyone running a wild west campaign."

David Comford reviewed Six-Guns & Sorcery for Arcane magazine, rating it an 8 out of 10 overall, and stated that "Tombestone meets Dances with Wolves with a James Bond flavour in this sourcebook, which is worth a look if only to broaden the horizons of the Great Game."

== Awards ==
At the 1997 Origins Awards, Six-Guns & Sorcery won Best Roleplaying Supplement of 1996.

== Other reviews ==
- Valkyrie #14 (1997)
- Casus Belli #97
