= List of color film systems =

This is a list of color film processes known to have been created for photographing and exhibiting motion pictures in color since the first attempts were made in the late 1890s. It is limited to "natural color" processes, meaning processes in which the color is photographically recorded and reproduced rather than artificially added by hand-painting, stencil coloring, or other arbitrary "colorization" methods.

== Legend ==
- Process: the name of the process, as advertised by the company if commercialized. Known alternative names and second-party commercial aliases are also shown.
- Year: The earliest known year of existence based on patents, reports of demonstrations, etc. The first public showing or commercial use (if any) may be later.
- Projection method: a classification into one of four process types, plus a notation of how many primary colors were used:
  Additive: multiple black-and-white images photographed through color filters are projected through corresponding filters and united on the screen. The component images may either be projected simultaneously or in rapid succession.
  Subtractive: the color image is physically present as transparent coloring matter in the film. No special projection equipment is required.
  Mosaic (additive): the film incorporates a mosaic of extremely small color filters, allowing a color image to be photographed as one black-and-white image consisting of many microscopically small color-filtered fragments. The same mosaic reconstitutes the color when the film is projected, so no special equipment is needed.
  Lenticular (additive): a black-and-white film which has been embossed on its base side with hundreds or thousands of tiny lenses is used for the original photography, base side forward and in conjunction with a segmented multicolored filter on the camera lens. As in mosaic processes, the result is an array of adjacent microscopic black-and-white image fragments that record the color information. Projection must reverse the optical geometry used for photography, so it requires not only a similar segmented filter but also highly compatible and correctly adjusted projection optics.
- Inventor: the known inventor(s) of the process.
- Introductory film: the first known public showing of the process.

== List ==
Process	Year	Projection method	Inventor(s)	Introductory film
Lee-Turner Colour	1899	Additive (3 color)	Edward Raymond Turner	N/A (Experimental) (circa 1902)
Biocolour	1905	Additive (2 color)	William Friese-Greene	Untitled Film (1906)
Kinemacolor	1906	Additive (2 color)	George Albert Smith	Representatives of the British Isles (1909)
Warner-Powrie	1906	Mosaic (3 color)	John Hutchison Powrie; Florence M. Warner	Untitled film (1928)
Keller-Dorian	1908	Lenticular (3 color)	Albert Keller-Dorian; Rodolphe Berthon	Unknown
Cinecolorgraph	1912	Subtractive (2 color)	A. Hernandez-Mejia	Unknown
Brewster Color (I)	1913	Subtractive (2 color)	Percy Douglas Brewster	Unknown
Chronochrome a.k.a. Gaumont Color	1913	Additive (3 color)	Leon Gaumont	Unknown
Prizma (I)	1913	Additive (2 color)	William van Doren Kelley	Our Navy (1917)
Cinechrome	1914	Additive (3 color)	Colin Bennett	Prince of Wales in India (1921)
Kodachrome (I)	1916	Subtractive (2 color)	John G. Capstaff; Eastman-Kodak	Concerning $1,000
Technicolor (I)	1916	Additive (2 color)	Daniel F. Comstock; Herbert Kalmus; W. Burton Wescott	The Gulf Between (1917)
Douglass Color (Douglass Natural Color)	1918	Additive (2 color)	Leon Forrest Douglass	Nature Scenes (1918) and Cupid Angling (1918)
Kesdacolor	1918	Subtractive (2 color)	William van Doren Kelley; Carroll H. Dunning	American Flag (1918)
Prizma (II)	1918	Subtractive (2 color)	William van Doren Kelley	The Glorious Adventure (1922)
Gilmore Color	1918	Additive (2 color)	Frederic Eugene Ives; Otto C. Gilmore	Unknown
Zoechrome	1920	Subtractive (3 color)	T.A. Mills	Unknown
ColorCraft	1921	Subtractive (2 color)	W.H. Peck	Unknown
Polychromide	1922	Additive (2 color)	Aron Hamburger	Unknown
Technicolor (II)	1922	Subtractive (2 color)	Daniel F. Comstock; Joseph A. Ball; Leonard T. Troland; Jarvis M. Andrews	The Toll of the Sea (1922)
Szczepanik	1924	Additive (3 color)	Jan Szczepanik	Unknown
Kelleycolor	1926	Subtractive (2 color)	William van Doren Kelley; Max Handschiegl	Unknown
Color Cinema Corporation	1927	Subtractive (2 color)	Color Cinema Corporation	Unknown
Lignose Naturfarbenfilm	1927	Additive (3 color)	Lignose	Unknown
Busch Color	1928	Additive (2 color)		Unknown
Harriscolor	1928	Subtractive (2 color)	William Van Doren Kelley	Unknown
Kodacolor (I)	1928	Lenticular (3 color)	Rodolphe Berthon	N/A (16 mm home movies only) (1928)
Raycol	1928	Additive (2 color)	Maurice Elvey	The School for Scandal (1930)
Splendicolor	1928	Subtractive (3 color)		Unknown
Technicolor (III)	1928	Subtractive (2 color)	Daniel F. Comstock	The Viking (1928)
Agfa bipack	1929	Subtractive (2 color)	Agfa	Unknown
Horst Color	1929	Additive (3 color)	L. Horst	Unknown
Multicolor	1929	Subtractive (2 color)	William Thomas Crespinel	Unknown
Finlay	1929	Additive (3 color)	Clare l. Finlay	Unknown
Harriscolor	1929	Subtractive (2 color)	J.B. Harris Jr.	Unknown
Cinechrome	1930	Unknown	Cinecolor Ltd.	Unknown
Cineoptichrome	1930	Additive (2 color)	Lucien Roux; Armand Roux	Unknown
Dascolor	1930	Subtractive (2 color)	M. L. F. Dassonville	Unknown
Harmonicolor	1930	Additive (2 color)	Maurice Combs	Talking Hands (1936)
Hirlicolor	1930	Subtractive (2 color)	George A. Hirliman	Captain Calamity (1936)
Photocolor	1930	Subtractive (2 color)	Photocolor Corp.	The Gift of Montezuma (1930)
Pilney Color	1930	Subtractive (2 color)		Unknown
Allfarbenfilm	1930	Additive (3 color)		Unknown
Sennettcolor	1930	Subtractive (2 color)	Mack Sennett (financier)	Strange Birds (1930)
Sirius Color	1930	Subtractive (2 color)	L. Horst	Unknown
Brewster Color (II)	1930	Subtractive (2 or 3 color)	Percy Douglas Brewster	Autumn Foliage (1930)
UFAcolor a.k.a. Chemicolor, Spectracolor	1930	Subtractive (2 color)	UFA Studios	Pagliacci (1936)
Vitacolor	1930	Additive (2 color)	William Van Doren Kelley; Max B. Du Pont (financier)	Unknown
Chimicolor	1931	Subtractive (3 color)	Syndicate de la Cinematographe des Couleurs	Unknown
Magnacolor	1931	Subtractive (2 color)	Consolidated Laboratories	The Bold Caballero (1936)
Dufaycolor	1931	Mosaic (3 color)	Louis Dufay; Dufay-Chromex Co.	Sons of the Sea (1939)
DuPack	1931	Subtractive (2 color)	DuPont Co.	Unknown
Rota Farbenfilm	1931	Subtractive (2 color)		Unknown
Russian two-color system	1931	Subtractive (2 color)	Nikolai Agokos; Fedor Provorov; Pavel Mershin	Karnaval cvetov (1935)
AGFAcolor (I)	1932	Lenticular (3 color)	AGFA	N/A (16mm only)
Cinecolor (I)	1932	Subtractive (2 color)	William T. Crispinel; Alan M. Gundelfinger	Sweden, Land of the Vikings (1934); Honeymoon Hotel (1934)
Technicolor (IV)	1932	Subtractive (3 color)	Joseph A. Ball	Flowers and Trees (1932)
Morgana Color	1932	Additive (2 color)	Bell and Howell; Lady Juliet Williams	N/A (16mm only)
Gasparcolor	1933	Subtractive (3 color)	Bela Gaspar	Kreise (1933) and Muratti Greift Ein (1934)
Vericolor	1933	Subtractive (2 color)	Vericolor Inc.	The Magic Isle (1935)
Francita Process a.k.a. Opticolor (UK)	1935	Additive (3 color)	British Realita Syndica, Ltd.	Jeunies filles à marier (1935)
Kodachrome (II)	1935	Subtractive (3 color)	Eastman Kodak	N/A (16mm only)
Cosmocolor	1935	Subtractive (2 color)	Otto C. Gilmore	Wings Over the Golden Gate (1935)
Russian three-color process	1936	Subtractive (3 color)	Pavel Mershin; Fedor Provorov; Avenir Min	The Fox and the Wolf (1937)
Telco-Color	1936	Subtractive (3 color)		Cavalcade of Texas (1938)
Dunningcolor	1937	Subtractive (3 color)	Carroll H. Dunning; Dodge Dunning	Tehauntepec (1937)
AGFAColor (II) a.k.a. Sovcolor, Chrome Color Art Chrome Color, ORWOcolor	1939	Subtractive (3 color)	I.G. Farben	Frauen sind doch bessere Diplomaten (1939–41)
Thomascolor	1942	Additive (3 color)	Richard Thomas	Unknown
Trucolor (I)	1946	Subtractive (2 color)	Consolidated Film Industries	Out California Way (1946)
Cinefotocolor	1947	Subtractive (2 color)	Daniel Aragonés	El un rincón de España (1948)
Fullcolor	1947	Subtractive (3 color)		The Goldwyn Follies (1947 reissue)
Rouxcolor	1947	Additive (3 color)	Lucien Roux; Armand Roux	The Miller's Daughter (1948)
Thomson Color	1947	Lenticular (3 color)	Société Thomson	Jour de fête (1949, color version not released until 1994)
Cinecolor (II) a.k.a. SuperCineColor	1948	Subtractive (3 color)	Alan M. Gundelfinger	The Sword of Monte Cristo (1951)
Konicolor	1948	Subtractive (3 color)	Konishi Roku	
Magicolor	1947	Subtractive (3 color)		The Humpbacked Horse (a.k.a. The Magic Horse, 1947)
Polacolor	1948	Subtractive (3 color)	Polaroid Corp.	Unknown
Technichrome	1948	Subtractive (2 Color)	Technicolor Company of England	The Olympic Games of 1948
Trucolor (II)	1948	Subtractive (3 color)	Republic Pictures; Consolidated Film Industries	This is Korea (1951)
Eastmancolor a.k.a. DeLuxe Color Metrocolor Pathécolor (II) WarnerColor and Technicolor (after 1954)	1950	Subtractive (3 color)	Eastman Kodak	Royal Journey (1951)
Alfacolour a.k.a. Agfacolor	1950	Subtractive (2 color)	Alpha Photographic Laboratories	Unknown
Ansco Color	1952	Subtractive (3 color)	General Aniline and Film Corp.	Climbing the Matterhorn (1948)
Dugromacolor	1952	Additive (3 color)	Dumas, Grosset, and Marx	Unknown
Ferraniacolor	1952	Subtractive (3 color)		Toto in Color (1952)
Fox Lenticular Film	1953	Lenticular (3 color)	Twentieth Century-Fox	N/A (experimental)
Fujicolor	1953	Subtractive (3 color)		Adventure of Natsuko (1953)
Polavision	1977	Additive (3 color) mosaic	Polaroid Corp.	Super 8mm only
