= Cinecolor =

Early two-color motion picture process

Japanese Lanterns (1935) by The Van Beuren Corporation, an animated short which makes use of Cinecolor

Cinecolor was an early subtractive color-model two-color motion picture process that was based upon the Prizma system of the 1910s and 1920s and the Multicolor system of the late 1920s and the 1930s. It was developed by William T. Crispinel and Alan M. Gundelfinger, and its various formats were in use from 1932 to 1955.

== Method ==
As a bipack color process, the photographer loaded a standard camera with two film stocks: an orthochromatic strip dyed orange-red and a panchromatic strip behind it. The orthochromatic film stock recorded only blue and green, and its orange-red dye (analogous to a Wratten 23-A filter) filtered out everything but orange and red light to the panchromatic film stock.

Since the distance to the two film emulsions differed in depth from a single emulsion, the camera's lens focus had to be adjusted and a special film gate added to accommodate a bipack negative.

In the laboratory, the negatives were developed and the orange-red dye removed. The prints were made on duplitized film and developed as black and white positives. One side containing the red-orange filtered recorded and the soundtrack was toned blue-green; the other side containing the blue-green record was toned red-orange.

Cinecolor could produce vibrant reds, oranges, blues, browns and flesh tones, but its renderings of other colors such as bright greens (rendered dark green) and purples (rendered a sort of dark magenta) were muted.

== History ==
The Cinecolor process was invented in 1932 by the English-born cinematographer William Thomas Crespinel (1890–1987), who joined the Kinemacolor Corporation in 1906 and went to New York in 1913 to work with Kinemacolor's American unit. After that company folded in 1916, he worked for Prizma, another color film company, founded by William Van Doren Kelley. He later worked for Multicolor and patented several inventions in the field of color cinematography.

After leaving Multicolor, Crespinel co-founded the Colorfilm Corporation of California in 1932. By May 1932, the name of the company was changed to Cinecolor, Inc. (later Cinecolor Corporation). William Loss, a director of the Citizens Traction Company in New York, was its principal investor. The company bought four acres of land in Burbank, California for its processing plant.

The company was largely founded on the patents and equipment of William Van Doren Kelley and his Prizma Color system, and was in direct competition with Multicolor, which folded in 1932, and Cinecolor then bought its equipment.

== Cheaper alternative to Technicolor ==
Although its color spectrum was limited by comparison, Cinecolor had several advantages over Technicolor: color rushes were available within 24 hours (Technicolor took four days or more); the process itself cost only 25% more than black-and-white photography (the price lowered as larger amounts of Cinecolor film stock were bought), and it could be used in modified black-and-white cameras.

Before 1945, Cinecolor was used almost exclusively for short subjects. From 1932 to 1935, at least 45 cartoons were filmed in Cinecolor, including the first season of Rainbow Parade cartoons for Van Beuren and the Comicolor cartoons by Ub Iwerks (1933-1935) for independent distributor Pat Powers. Notable Cinecolor cartoons were Betty Boop in Fleischer Studios' Poor Cinderella (1934), two Merrie Melodies cartoons, Honeymoon Hotel (1934) and Beauty and the Beast (1934), two Ub Iwerks cartoons from 1934, Davy Jones' Locker and Hell's Fire, and Ted Eshbaugh's The Snowman (1933).

The first feature-length pictures released in Cinecolor were the documentary feature Sweden, Land of the Vikings (1934) and the independently made western The Phantom of Santa Fe (1936, but filmed in Multicolor in 1931 and starring Multicolor executive Wallace MacDonald). A short-term burst of feature-film activity in 1939 -- yielding the RKO Radio release Isle of Destiny and the Monogram Pictures release The Gentleman from Arizona -- was not enough to keep the company solvent, and Cinecolor went into voluntary bankruptcy in 1942. An upsurge in commercial and industrial films made in color improved the company's balance sheet, and in 1942 home-movie distributor Castle Films expanded the Cinecolor line to the 16mm and 8mm film formats, reprinting the Ub Iwerks ComiColor cartoons until 1951. Cinecolor emerged from bankruptcy in October 1944, with all creditors paid in full. Its stock price (only four cents a share in 1943) jumped to $8.50 in 1946.

Lower-budgeted companies such as Monogram, Producers Releasing Corporation, and Screen Guild Productions were Cinecolor's chief contractors in the mid-1940s. A 1945 PRC Cinecolor release, The Enchanted Forest, was the studio's highest-grossing film of the year, and PRC's series of Cinecolor westerns with Eddie Dean attracted attention among exhibitors. Screen Guild's Scared to Death (1947) featured Bela Lugosi in his only color film.

The commercial and critical success of those films led both major and minor studios to use Cinecolor as a money-saving measure. Cinecolor 35mm film stock cost about 25% less than Technicolor (in 1946, 4.5 cents a foot for Cinecolor vs. 5.97 cents a foot for Technicolor). International Projectionist noted that "Cinecolor's service charges are also lower than Technicolor's, and the cost differential on a standard feature will exceed $50,000 by the time prints have been made, an important sum for a low-budget picture." When more producers opted for Cinecolor, the company was able to reduce the cost of printing, which made Cinecolor an even more attractive option.

== Mainstream success ==
Cinecolor enjoyed a popular vogue in the mid- to late 1940s. Cinecolor's erstwhile principal investor, William Loss, was now the company's vice president and general manager, and he promoted Cinecolor to Hollywood producers. The first and only producer to adopt an all-Cinecolor policy was pioneer comedy producer Hal Roach, who reopened his studio after the war and henceforth made all of his theatrical featurettes in Cinecolor. Roach's erstwhile distributor, MGM, also experimented with a Cinecolor feature, Gallant Bess (1947).

Technicolor, Inc. was struggling in the late 1940s, faced with anti-trust charges from the United States Department of Justice as well as labor unrest as the backlog of work piled up. When delays at the Technicolor plant affected the Warner Bros. Cartoons release schedule, the studio began using Cinecolor for its popular animated cartoons in 1947, as a short-term solution.

Other short-subject productions went the same route: many of Famous Studios' late-1940s Popeye the Sailor cartoons; Columbia's Phantasies of 1947-1949, and Paramount's Popular Science series of live-action shorts. Later prints of the Popular Science reels were made by Consolidated Film Industries using its two-color Magnacolor process. In 1946 Consolidated's movie-studio subsidiary, Republic Pictures, introduced its own two-color process, Trucolor, which used a dye-coupler already built into the film base, rather than the application of chemical toner.

The Warner-Pathé newsreel made headlines in the trade when it introduced Cinecolor in its first January issue of 1948. Both the Tournament of Roses parade and the Rose Bowl football game were photographed in Cinecolor. This same footage was featured in the new Warner-Pathé Canadian News, making its screen debut on Jan. 9, 1948.

With Roach, MGM, and Warner going ahead with Cinecolor, other studios followed suit: Columbia (The Gallant Blade, 1948) and Eagle-Lion (Northwest Stampede, 1948, and its Red Ryder westerns, 1949). Most features made in Cinecolor were outdoor adventures and westerns, because the main color palette in those films consisted of blues, browns, and reds, and so the system's limitations were less apparent.

== Expansion ==
In October 1947 Cinecolor bought a film production company, Film Classics, to promote its color process in its own feature films. Joseph Bernhard, president of Film Classics, became vice president of Cinecolor. Seven months later, Cinecolor president and founder William Crespinel stepped down, and Bernhard assumed the Cinecolor presidency on May 15, 1948. Entering the production field proved to be a risky move, as Film Classics' original productions weren't successful enough to sustain the studio, which left the scene in 1951.

Meanwhile, on the technical front, 1948 was important for the Cinecolor Corporation, which introduced a new supersensitive negative stock that cut back on the on-set lighting costs by 50 percent and 1,000-foot (300 m) camera film magazines. Combined, they reduced the cost of shooting in Cinecolor to only 10 percent more than black and white.

== SuperCinecolor ==
Cinecolor's Alan Gundelfinger developed a three-color process called SuperCinecolor in 1948, but studios did not begin using it until 1951. Six of the first seven SuperCinecolor features were made by Columbia, beginning with When the Redskins Rode (1951); the one non-Columbia production was Drums in the Deep South (1950), released by RKO. Other films of note that used the SuperCinecolor process were Abbott and Costello Meet Captain Kidd (1952), Jack and the Beanstalk (1952), Invaders From Mars (1953), Gog (1954), and Top Banana (1954). The latter two were both also filmed in 3-D.

SuperCinecolor used black-and-white separations produced from monopack color negatives made with Agfa-Ansco, DuPont, Kodachrome, or Eastmancolor film, for principal photography. After the negative was edited, it was copied through color filters into three black-and-white negatives. According to archivists who restored Abbott and Costello Meet Captain Kidd, SuperCinecolor printed its films with red, blue, and yellow matrices to create a system that was compatible with the previous printers, although inventor Alan Gundelfinger referred to the three colors as cyan, magenta, and yellow: "The cyan component of the Cinecolor three-color process, while not perfect, is satisfactory. In the case of the yellow and magenta components, these two are excellent."

Printing SuperCinecolor was not difficult, as it was engineered to use the old Cinecolor equipment. Using duplitized stock, one side contained a silver emulsion toned red-magenta and, on the other side, cyan-blue. A yellow layer was added on the blue side by imbibition. The soundtrack was subsequently applied on the blue-yellow side in a blue soundtrack but separate from those records. The final prints had vivid dyes that did not fade and were of acceptable grain structure and sharp in focus. Gundelfinger pointed with pride to SuperCinecolor's color registration: "The Cinecolor printing machines utilize push-down pins located just above the aperture rather than the conventional pull-down pins which are usually present below the aperture. Because of this, the wear and tear on the perforations utilized for registration is minimized, no matter how badly shrunk the negatives might be. It is the rule, rather than the exception, that the steadiness and excellent image superposition of the five-hundredth copy is identical with that of the first copy."

== Last years ==
Cinecolor Corp. operated at a net loss from 1950 to 1954, partly because the weak financial position of its division in England made it necessary for the parent company to refinance it and partly because of its own operating losses. The last American feature released in Cinecolor was Allied Artists' Pride of the Blue Grass (1954).

Donner Corporation, a private investment organization, acquired Cinecolor Corp. in June 1952. In 1953, it became the Color Corporation of America, specialized in SuperCinecolor printing, and was a major Anscocolor processor. It also made Eastmancolor prints and did commercial film processing and printing of non-theatrical films, and black-and-white film processing for television. To stimulate its theatrical film business, Color Corp. financed independent movie producers. The last theatrical feature with a SuperCinecolor credit was The Diamond Queen, released by Warner Bros. in November 1953. Thereafter, "Color by Color Corp. of America" was used for films like Shark River (1953) and Top Banana (1954).

Color Corporation of America was bought out on April 8, 1954 by Houston Color Film Laboratories, which processed Anscocolor at its plant in Los Angeles, and Houston Fearless Corp., which made processing and developing equipment. It became strictly an Anscocolor processor. Color Corp. sold its film processing laboratory in mid-1955 to provide its television and motion picture equipment-making division a laboratory in which to test its equipment, and the corporation was dissolved.

== See also ==
- Color motion picture film
- Color photography
- List of color film systems
- List of film formats
- Multicolor
- Prizma
- Technicolor
- Trucolor
