= Color motion picture film =

Photographic film type

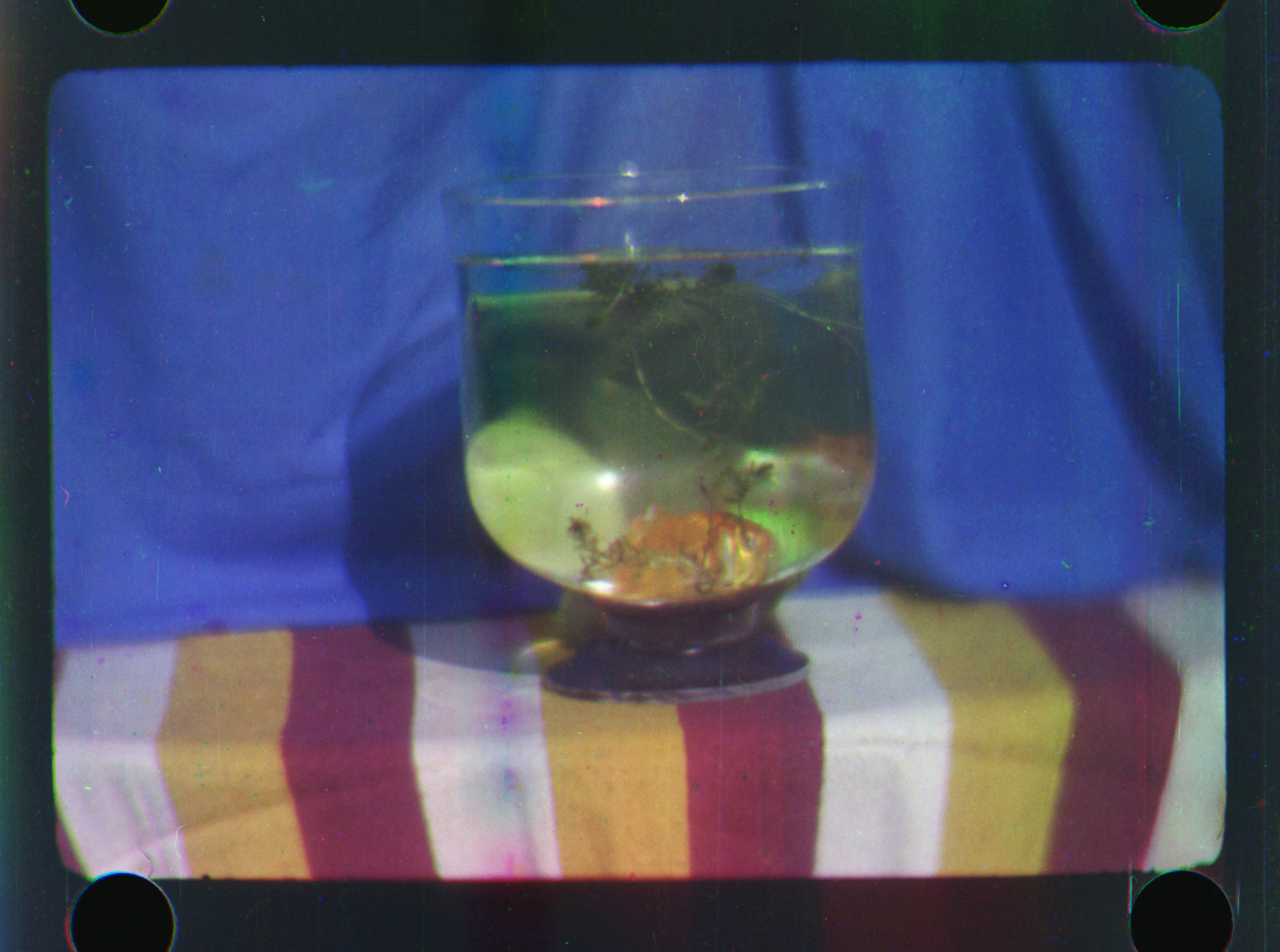
Still from test film made by Edward Turner in 1902, as secret technology

Color motion picture film refers both to unexposed color photographic film in a format suitable for use in a motion picture camera, and to finished motion picture film, ready for use in a projector, which bears images in color.

The first color cinematography was by additive color systems such as the one patented by Edward Raymond Turner in 1899 and tested in 1902. A simplified additive system was successfully commercialized in 1909 as Kinemacolor. These early systems used black-and-white film to photograph and project two or more component images through different color filters.

During the 1930s, the first practical subtractive color processes were introduced. These also used black-and-white film to photograph multiple color-filtered source images, but the final product was a multicolored print that did not require special projection equipment. Before 1932, when three-strip Technicolor was introduced, commercialized subtractive processes used only two color components and could reproduce only a limited range of color.

In 1935, Kodachrome was introduced, followed by Agfacolor in 1936. They were intended primarily for amateur home movies and "slides". These were the first films of the "integral tripack" type, coated with three layers of different color-sensitive emulsion, which is usually what is meant by the words "color film" as commonly used. The few color photographic films still being made in the 2020s are of this type. The first color negative films and corresponding print films were modified versions of these films. They were introduced around 1940 but only came into wide use for commercial motion picture production in the early 1950s. In the US, Eastman Kodak's Eastmancolor was the usual choice, but it was often re-branded with another trade name, such as "WarnerColor", by the studio or the film processor.

Later color films were standardized into two distinct processes: Eastman Color Negative 2 chemistry (camera negative stocks, duplicating interpositive and internegative stocks) and Eastman Color Positive 2 chemistry (positive prints for direct projection), usually abbreviated as ECN-2 and ECP-2. Fuji's products are compatible with ECN-2 and ECP-2.

The transition happened gradually, with 10% color in the early 1950s and 90% in the middle 1970s when considering all live-action feature films produced worldwide, and a tipping point in 1967. Film was the dominant form of cinematography until the 2010s, when it was largely replaced by digital cinematography.

== Overview ==
The first motion pictures were photographed using a simple homogeneous photographic emulsion that yielded a black-and-white image—that is, an image in shades of gray, ranging from black to white, corresponding to the luminous intensity of each point on the photographed subject. Light, shade, form and movement were captured, but not color.

With color motion picture film, information about the color of the light at each image point is also captured. This is done by analyzing the visible spectrum of color into several regions (normally three, commonly referred to by their dominant colors: red, green and blue) and recording each region separately.

Current color films do this with three layers of differently color-sensitive photographic emulsion coated on one strip of film base. Early processes used color filters to photograph the color components as completely separate images (e.g., three-strip Technicolor) or adjacent microscopic image fragments (e.g., Dufaycolor) in a one-layer black-and-white emulsion.

Each photographed color component, initially just a colorless record of the luminous intensities in the part of the spectrum that it captured, is processed to produce a transparent dye image in the color complementary to the color of the light that it recorded. The superimposed dye images combine to synthesize the original colors by the subtractive color method. In some early color processes (e.g., Kinemacolor), the component images remained in black-and-white form and were projected through color filters to synthesize the original colors by the additive color method.

== Tinting and manual coloring ==
The earliest motion picture stocks were orthochromatic, and recorded blue and green light, but not red. Recording all three spectral regions required making film stock panchromatic to some degree. As orthochromatic film stock hindered color photography in its beginnings, the first films with color in them used aniline dyes to create artificial color. Manual-colored films appeared in 1895 with Thomas Edison's manual-painted Annabelle's Dance for his Kinetoscope viewers.

Many early filmmakers from the first ten years of film also used this method to some degree. Georges Méliès offered manual-painted prints of his own films at an additional cost over the black-and-white versions, including the visual-effects pioneering A Trip to the Moon (1902). The film had various parts of the film painted frame-by-frame by twenty-one women in Montreuil in a production-line method.

The first commercially successful stencil color process was introduced in 1905 by Segundo de Chomón working for Pathé Frères. Pathé Color, renamed Pathéchrome in 1929, became one of the most accurate and reliable stencil coloring systems. It incorporated an original print of a film with sections cut by pantograph in the appropriate areas for up to six colors by a coloring machine with dye-soaked, velvet rollers. After a stencil had been made for the whole film, it was placed into contact with the print to be colored and run at high speed (60 feet per minute) through the coloring (staining) machine. The process was repeated for each set of stencils corresponding to a different color. By 1910, Pathé had over 400 women employed as stencilers in their Vincennes factory. Pathéchrome continued production through the 1930s.

A more common technique emerged in the early 1910s known as film tinting, a process in which either the emulsion or the film base is dyed, giving the image a uniform monochromatic color. This process was popular during the silent era, with specific colors employed for certain narrative effects (red for scenes with fire or firelight, blue for night, etc.).

A complementary process, called toning, replaces the silver particles in the film with metallic salts or mordanted dyes. This creates a color effect in which the dark parts of the image are replaced with a color (e.g., blue and white rather than black and white). Tinting and toning were sometimes applied together.

In the United States, St. Louis engraver Max Handschiegl and cinematographer Alvin Wyckoff created the Handschiegl Color Process, a dye-transfer equivalent of the stencil process, first used in Joan the Woman (1917) directed by Cecil B. DeMille, and used in special effects sequences for films such as The Phantom of the Opera (1925).

Eastman Kodak introduced its own system of pre-tinted black-and-white film stocks called Sonochrome in 1929. The Sonochrome line featured films tinted in seventeen different colors including Peachblow, Inferno, Candle Flame, Sunshine, Purple Haze, Firelight, Azure, Nocturne, Verdante, Aquagreen, Caprice, Fleur de Lis, Rose Doree, and the neutral-density Argent, which kept the screen from becoming excessively bright when switching to a black-and-white scene.

Tinting and toning continued to be used well into the sound era. In the 1930s and 1940s, some western films were processed in a sepia-toning solution to evoke the feeling of old photographs of the day. Tinting was used as late as 1951 for Sam Newfield's sci-fi film Lost Continent for the green lost-world sequences. Alfred Hitchcock used a form of manual-coloring for the orange-red gun-blast at the audience in Spellbound (1945). Kodak's Sonochrome and similar pre-tinted stocks were still in production until the 1970s and were used commonly for custom theatrical trailers and snipes.

In the last half of the 20th century, Norman McLaren, who was one of the pioneers in animated movies, made several animated films in which he directly manually painted the images, and in some cases, also the soundtrack, on each frame of the film. This approach was previously employed in the early years of movies, late 19th and early 20th century. One of the precursors in color manual painting frame by frame were the Aragonese Segundo de Chomón and his French wife Julienne Mathieu, who were Melies' close competitors.

Tinting was gradually replaced by natural color techniques.

== Physics of light and color ==
A three-color theory of combination, which informs that all colors are created by combining the three main hues of red, blue, and green, was first established by Thomas Young and Hermann von Helmholtz, in the early 19th century.

These principles on which color photography is based were first proposed by Scottish physicist James Clerk Maxwell in 1855 and presented at the Royal Society in London in 1861. By that time, it was known that light comprises a spectrum of different wavelengths that are perceived as different colors as they are absorbed and reflected by natural objects. Maxwell discovered that all natural colors in this spectrum as perceived by the human eye may be reproduced with additive combinations of three primary colors—red, green, and blue—which, when mixed equally, produce white light.

Between 1900 and 1935, dozens of natural color systems were introduced, although only a few were successful.

=== Additive color ===
The first color systems that appeared in motion pictures were additive color systems. Additive color was practical because no special color stock was necessary. Black-and-white film could be processed and used in both filming and projection. The various additive systems entailed the use of color filters on both the movie camera and projector. Additive color adds lights of the primary colors in various proportions to the projected image. Because of the limited amount of space to record images on film, and later because the lack of a camera that could record more than two strips of film at once, most early motion-picture color systems consisted of two colors, often red and green or red and blue.

The pioneering three-color additive system was patented in England by Edward Raymond Turner in 1899. It used a rotating set of red, green and blue filters to photograph the three color components one after the other on three successive frames of panchromatic black-and-white film. The finished film was projected through similar filters to reconstitute the color. In 1902, Turner shot test footage to demonstrate his system, but projecting it proved problematic because of the accurate registration (alignment) of the three separate color elements required for acceptable results. Turner died a year later without having satisfactorily projected the footage. In 2012, curators at the National Media Museum in Bradford, UK, had the original custom-format nitrate film copied to black-and-white 35 mm film, which was then scanned into a digital video format by telecine. Finally, digital image processing was used to align and combine each group of three frames into one color image. As a result, these films from 1902 became viewable in full color.

With Our King and Queen Through India, extract

Practical color in the motion picture business began with Kinemacolor, first demonstrated in 1906. This was a two-color system created in England by George Albert Smith, and commercialized by film pioneer Charles Urban's Natural Color Kinematograph Company from 1909 on. It was used for a many films, most notably the documentary With Our King and Queen Through India, depicting the Delhi Durbar (also known as The Durbar at Delhi, 1912), which was filmed in December 1911. The Kinemacolor process consisted of alternating frames of specially sensitized black-and-white film exposed at 32 frames per second through a rotating filter with alternating red and green areas. The printed film was projected through similar alternating red and green filters at the same speed. A perceived range of colors resulted from the blending of the separate red and green alternating images by the viewer's persistence of vision.

William Friese-Greene invented another additive color system called Biocolour, which was developed by his son Claude Friese-Greene after William's death in 1921. William sued George Albert Smith, alleging that the Kinemacolor process infringed on the patents for his Bioschemes, Ltd.; as a result, Smith's patent was revoked in 1914. Both Kinemacolor and Biocolour had problems with "fringing" or "haloing" of the image, due to the separate red and green images not fully matching up.

By their nature, these additive systems were very wasteful of light. Absorption by the color filters involved meant that only a minor fraction of the projection light actually reached the screen, resulting in an image that was dimmer than a typical black-and-white image. The larger the screen, the dimmer the picture. For this and other case-by-case reasons, the use of additive processes for theatrical motion pictures had been almost completely abandoned by the early 1940s, though additive color methods are employed by all the color video and computer display systems in common use today.

=== Subtractive color ===
The first practical subtractive color process was introduced by Kodak as "Kodachrome", a name recycled twenty years later for a very different and far better-known product. Filter-photographed red and blue-green records were printed onto the front and back of one strip of black-and-white duplitized film. After development, the resulting silver images were bleached away and replaced with color dyes, red on one side and cyan on the other. The pairs of superimposed dye images reproduced a useful but limited range of color. Kodak's first narrative film with the process was a short subject entitled Concerning $1000 (1916). Though their duplitized film provided the basis for several commercialized two-color printing processes, the image origination and color-toning methods constituting Kodak's own process were little-used.

The first truly successful subtractive color process was William van Doren Kelley's Prizma, an early color process that was first introduced at the American Museum of Natural History in New York City on 8 February 1917. Prizma began in 1916 as an additive system similar to Kinemacolor.

However, after 1917, Kelley reinvented the process as a subtractive one with several years of short films and travelogues, such as Everywhere With Prizma (1919) and A Prizma Color Visit to Catalina (1919) before releasing features such as the documentary Bali the Unknown (1921), The Glorious Adventure (1922), and Venus of the South Seas (1924). A Prizma promotional short filmed for Del Monte Foods titled Sunshine Gatherers (1921) is available on DVD in Treasures 5 The West 1898–1938 by the National Film Preservation Foundation.

The invention of Prizma led to a series of similarly printed color processes. This bipack color system used two strips of film running through the camera, one recording red, and one recording blue-green light. With the black-and-white negatives being printed onto duplitized film, the color images were then toned red and blue, effectively creating a subtractive color print.

Leon Forrest Douglass (1869–1940), a founder of Victor Records, developed a system he called Naturalcolor, and first showed a short test film made in the process on 15 May 1917 at his home in San Rafael, California. The only feature film known to have been made in this process, Cupid Angling (1918)—starring Ruth Roland and with cameo appearances by Mary Pickford and Douglas Fairbanks—was filmed in the Lake Lagunitas area of Marin County, California.

A Kodak 1922 film test in colour

After experimenting with additive systems (including a camera with two apertures, one with a red filter, one with a green filter) from 1915 to 1921, Dr. Herbert Kalmus, Dr. Daniel Comstock, and mechanic W. Burton Wescott developed a subtractive color system for Technicolor. The system used a beam splitter in a specially modified camera to send red and green light to adjacent frames of one strip of black-and-white film. From this negative, skip-printing was used to print each color's frames contiguously onto film stock with half the normal base thickness. The two prints were chemically toned to roughly complementary hues of red and green, then cemented together, back to back, into a single strip of film. The first film to use this process was The Toll of the Sea (1922) starring Anna May Wong. Perhaps the most ambitious film to use it was The Black Pirate (1926), starring and produced by Douglas Fairbanks.

The process was later refined through the incorporation of dye imbibition, which allowed for the transferring of dyes from both color matrices into a single print, avoiding several problems that had become evident with the cemented prints and allowing multiple prints to be created from a single pair of matrices.

Technicolor's early system were in use for several years, but it was a very expensive process: shooting cost three times that of black-and-white photography and printing costs were no cheaper. By 1932, color photography in general had nearly been abandoned by major studios, until Technicolor developed a new advancement to record all three primary colors. Utilizing a special dichroic beam splitter equipped with two 45-degree prisms in the form of a cube, light from the lens was deflected by the prisms and split into two paths to expose each one of three black-and-white negatives (one each to record the densities for red, green, and blue).

The three negatives were then printed to gelatin matrices, which also completely bleached the image, washing out the silver and leaving only the gelatin record of the image. A receiver print, consisting of a 50% density print of the black-and-white negative for the green record strip, and including the soundtrack, was struck and treated with dye mordants to aid in the imbibition process (this "black" layer was discontinued in the early 1940s). The matrices for each strip were coated with their complementary dye (yellow, cyan, or magenta), and then each successively brought into high-pressure contact with the receiver, which imbibed and held the dyes, which collectively rendered a wider spectrum of color than previous technologies. The first animation film with the three-color (also called three-strip) system was Walt Disney's Flowers and Trees (1932), the first short live-action film was La Cucaracha (1934), and the first feature was Becky Sharp (1935).

Gasparcolor, a single-strip 3-color system, was developed in 1933 by the Hungarian chemist Dr. Bela Gaspar.

The real push for color films and the nearly immediate changeover from black-and-white production to nearly all color film were pushed forward by the prevalence of television in the early 1950s. In 1947, only 12 percent of American films were made in color. By 1954, that number rose to over 50 percent. The rise in color films was also aided by the breakup of Technicolor's near monopoly on the medium.

In 1947, the United States Justice Department filed an antitrust suit against Technicolor for monopolization of color cinematography through their 1934 "Monopack Agreement" with Kodak (even though rival processes such as Cinecolor and Trucolor were in general use). In 1950, a federal court ordered Technicolor to allot a number of its three-strip cameras for use by independent studios and filmmakers. Although this certainly affected Technicolor, its real undoing was the invention of Eastmancolor that same year.

== Monopack color film ==
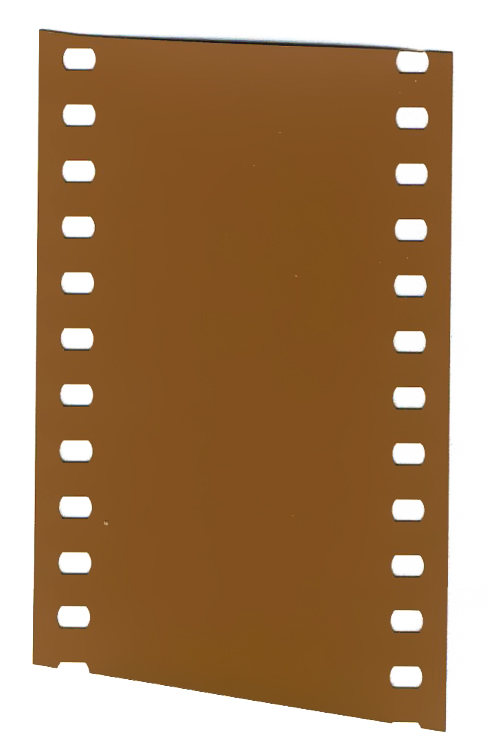
A strip of undeveloped 35 mm color negative.

In the field of motion pictures, the many-layered type of color film normally called an integral tripack in broader contexts has long been known by the less tongue-twisting term monopack. For many years, Monopack (capitalized) was a proprietary product of Technicolor Corp, whereas monopack (not capitalized) generically referred to any of several single-strip color film products, including various Eastman Kodak products. It appeared that Technicolor made no attempt to register Monopack as a trademark with the US Patent and Trademark Office, although it asserted that term as if it were a registered trademark, and it had the force of a legal agreement between it and Eastman Kodak to back up that assertion. It was a solely-sourced product, too, as Eastman Kodak was legally prevented from marketing any color motion picture film products wider than 16mm, 35mm specifically, until the expiration of the so-called "Monopack Agreement" in 1950. This, notwithstanding the facts that Technicolor never had the capability to manufacture sensitized motion picture films of any kind, nor single-strip color films based upon its so-called "Troland Patent" (which Technicolor maintained covered all monopack-type films in general, and which Eastman Kodak elected not to contest as Technicolor was then one of its largest customers, if not its largest customer). After 1950, Eastman Kodak was free to make and market color films of any kind, particularly including monopack color motion picture films in 65/70mm, 35mm, 16mm and 8mm. The "Monopack Agreement" had no effect on color still films.

Monopack color films are based on the subtractive color system, which filters colors from white light by using superimposed cyan, magenta and yellow dye images. Those images are created from records of the amounts of red, green and blue light present at each point of the image formed by the camera lens. A subtractive primary color (cyan, magenta, yellow) is what remains when one of the additive primary colors (red, green, blue) has been removed from the spectrum. Eastman Kodak's monopack color films incorporated three separate layers of differently color sensitive emulsion into one strip of film. Each layer recorded one of the additive primaries and was processed to produce a dye image in the complementary subtractive primary.

Kodachrome was the first commercially successful application of monopack multilayer film, introduced in 1935. For professional motion picture photography, Kodachrome Commercial, on a 35mm BH-perforated base, was available exclusively from Technicolor, as its so-called "Technicolor Monopack" product. Similarly, for sub-professional motion picture photography, Kodachrome Commercial, on a 16mm base, was available exclusively from Eastman Kodak. In both cases, Eastman Kodak was the sole manufacturer and the sole processor. In the 35mm case, Technicolor dye-transfer printing was a "tie-in" product. In the 16mm case, there were Eastman Kodak duplicating and printing stocks and associated chemistry, not the same as a "tie-in" product. In exceptional cases, Technicolor offered 16mm dye-transfer printing, but this necessitated the exceptionally wasteful process of printing on a 35mm base, only thereafter to be re-perforated and re-slit to 16mm, thereby discarding slightly more than one-half of the end product.

A late modification to the "Monopack Agreement", the "Imbibition Agreement", finally allowed Technicolor to economically manufacture 16mm dye-transfer prints as so-called "double-rank" 35/32mm prints (two 16mm prints on a 35mm base that was originally perforated at the 16mm specification for both halves, and was later re-slit into two 16mm wide prints without the need for re-perforation). This modification also facilitated the early experiments by Eastman Kodak with its negative-positive monopack film, which eventually became Eastmancolor. Essentially, the "Imbibition Agreement" lifted a portion of the "Monopack Agreement's" restrictions on Technicolor (which prevented it from making motion picture products less than 35mm wide) and somewhat related restrictions on Eastman Kodak (which prevented it from experimenting and developing monopack products greater than 16mm wide).

Eastmancolor, introduced in 1950, was Kodak's first economical, single-strip 35 mm negative-positive process incorporated into one strip of film. This eventually rendered Three-Strip color photography obsolete, even though, for the first few years of Eastmancolor, Technicolor continued to offer Three-Strip origination combined with dye-transfer printing (150 titles produced in 1953, 100 titles produced in 1954 and 50 titles produced in 1955, the last year for Three-Strip as camera negative stock). The first commercial feature film to use Eastmancolor was the documentary Royal Journey, released in December 1951. Hollywood studios waited until an improved version of Eastmancolor negative came out in 1952 before using it; This is Cinerama was an early film which employed three separate and interlocked strips of Eastmancolor negative. This is Cinerama was initially printed on Eastmancolor positive, but its significant success eventually resulted in it being reprinted by Technicolor, using dye-transfer.

By 1953, and especially with the introduction of anamorphic wide screen CinemaScope, Eastmancolor became a marketing imperative as CinemaScope was incompatible with Technicolor's Three-Strip camera and lenses. Indeed, Technicolor Corp became one of the best, if not the best, processor of Eastmancolor negative, especially for so-called "wide gauge" negatives (5-perf 65mm, 8- and 6-perf 35mm), yet it far preferred its own 35mm dye-transfer printing process for Eastmancolor-originated films with a print run that exceeded 500 prints, not withstanding the significant "loss of register" that occurred in such prints that were expanded by CinemaScope's 2X horizontal factor, and, to a lesser extent, with so-called "flat wide screen" (variously 1.66:1 or 1.85:1, but spherical and not anamorphic). This nearly fatal flaw was not corrected until 1955 and caused numerous features initially printed by Technicolor to be scrapped and reprinted by DeLuxe Labs. (These features are often billed as "Color by Technicolor-DeLuxe".) Indeed, some Eastmancolor-originated films billed as "Color by Technicolor" were never actually printed using the dye-transfer process, due in part to the throughput limitations of Technicolor's dye-transfer printing process, and competitor DeLuxe's superior throughput. Incredibly, DeLuxe once had a license to install a Technicolor-type dye-transfer printing line, but as the "loss of register" problems became apparent in Fox's CinemaScope features that were printed by Technicolor, after Fox had become an all-CinemaScope producer, Fox-owned DeLuxe Labs abandoned its plans for dye-transfer printing and became, and remained, an all-Eastmancolor shop, as Technicolor itself later became. One major downside of Eastmancolor was that the dyes used were unstable which caused the color to fade into magenta over time, with visible fading starting to occur within as little of a few years of manufacturing. While this cannot be prevented, it can be slowed down by storing the film stock in a cold environment where the chemical reactions responsible for it slow down. This has recently gained significant attention online as a result of the Blu-Ray editions of Sailor Moon having a pink tint due to film fading and no color correction being applied. While modern digital film scanning and color correcting techniques have mitigated this issue to an extent, it highlights the importance of digitizing and backing up of analog media.

Technicolor continued to offer its proprietary imbibition dye-transfer printing process for projection prints until 1975, and even briefly revived it in 1998. As an archival format, Technicolor prints are one of the most stable color print processes yet created, and prints properly cared for are estimated to retain their color for centuries. With the introduction of Eastmancolor low-fade positive print (LPP) films, properly stored (at 45 °F or 7 °C and 25 percent relative humidity) monopack color film is expected to last, with no fading, a comparative amount of time. Improperly stored monopack color film from before 1983 can incur a 30 percent image loss in as little as 25 years.

== Functionality ==
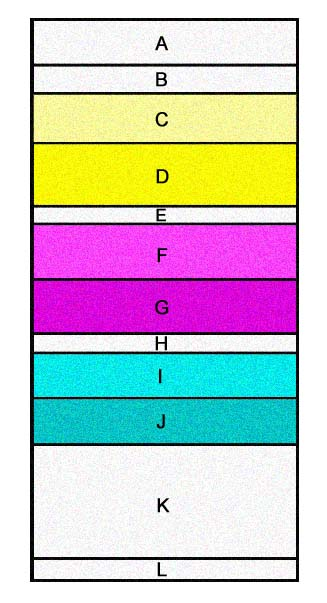
A representation of the layers within a piece of developed color 35 mm negative film. When developed, the dye couplers in the blue-, green-, and red-sensitive layers turn the exposed silver halide crystals to their complementary colors (yellow, magenta, and cyan). The film is made up of (A) Clear protective topcoat, (B) UV filter, (C) "Fast" blue layer, (D) "Slow" blue layer, (E) Yellow filter to cut all blue light from passing through to (F) "Fast" green layer, (G) "Slow" green layer, (H) Inter (subbing) layer, (I) "Fast" red layer, (J) "Slow" red layer, (K) Clear triacetate base, and (L) Antihalation (rem-jet) backing.

A color film is made up of many different layers that work together to create the color image. Color negative films provide three main color layers: the blue record, green record, and red record; each made up of two separate layers containing silver halide crystals and dye-couplers. A cross-sectional representation of a piece of developed color negative film is shown in the figure at the right. The triacetate base is 0.005 inch thick, the total thickness of the emulsion and other coatings is less than 0.0015 inches.

The three color records are stacked as shown at right, with a UV filter on top to keep the non-visible ultraviolet radiation from exposing the silver-halide crystals, which are naturally sensitive to UV light. Next are the fast and slow blue-sensitive layers, which, when developed, form the latent image. When the exposed silver-halide crystal is developed, it is coupled with a dye grain of its complementary color. This forms a dye "cloud" (like a drop of water on a paper towel) and is limited in its growth by development-inhibitor-releasing (DIR) couplers, which also serve to refine the sharpness of the processed image by limiting the size of the dye clouds. The dye clouds formed in the blue layer are actually yellow (the opposite or complementary color to blue). There are two layers to each color; a "fast" and a "slow." The fast layer features larger grains that are more sensitive to light than the slow layer, which has finer grain and is less sensitive to light. Silver-halide crystals are naturally sensitive to blue light, so the blue layers are on the top of the film and they are followed immediately by a yellow filter, which stops any more blue light from passing through to the green and red layers and biasing those crystals with extra blue exposure. Next are the green-sensitive record (which forms magenta dyes when developed); and, at the bottom, the red-sensitive record, which forms cyan dyes when developed. Each color is separated by a gelatin layer that prevents silver development in one record from causing unwanted dye formation in another. On the back of the film base is an anti-halation layer that absorbs light which would otherwise be weakly reflected back through the film by that surface and create halos of light around bright features in the image. In color film, this backing is "rem-jet", a black-pigmented, non-gelatin layer which is removed in the developing process.

Eastman Kodak manufactures film in 54-inch (1,372 mm) wide rolls. These rolls are then slit into various sizes (70 mm, 65 mm, 35 mm, 16 mm) as needed.

== Manufacturers of color film for motion picture use ==
Motion picture film, primarily because of the rem-jet backing, requires different processing than standard C-41 process color film. The process necessary is ECN-2, which has an initial step using an alkaline bath to remove the backing layer. There are also minor differences in the remainder of the process. If motion picture negative is run through a standard C-41 color film developer bath, the rem-jet backing partially dissolves and destroys the integrity of the developer and, potentially, ruins the film.

=== Kodak color motion picture films ===
In the late 1980s, Kodak introduced the T-Grain emulsion, a technological advancement in the shape and make-up of silver halide grains in their films. T-Grain is a tabular silver halide grain that allows for greater overall surface area, resulting in greater light sensitivity with a relatively small grain and a more uniform shape that results in a less overall graininess to the film. This made for sharper and more sensitive films. The T-Grain technology was first employed in Kodak's EXR line of motion picture color negative stocks. This was further refined in 1996 with the Vision line of emulsions, followed by Vision2 in the early 2000s and Vision3 in 2007.

=== Fuji color motion picture films ===
Fuji films also integrated tabular grains in their SUFG (Super Unified Fine Grain) films. In their case, the SUFG grain is not only tabular, it is hexagonal and consistent in shape throughout the emulsion layers. Like the T-grain, it has a larger surface area in a smaller grain (about one-third the size of traditional grain) for the same light sensitivity. In 2005, Fuji unveiled their Eterna 500T stock, the first in a new line of advanced emulsions, with Super Nano-structure Σ Grain Technology.

== See also ==
- 135 film
- 35mm film
- Cinecolor
- Color photography
- Film base
- Film stock
- Kinemacolor
- List of color film systems
- List of early color feature films
- List of film formats
- List of motion picture film stocks
- Multicolor
- Photographic film mainly about film for stills
- Prizma
- Technicolor
