= Natural color =

Natural color was a term used in the beginning of film and later on in the 1920s, and early 1930s as a color film process that actually filmed color images, rather than a color tinted or colorized movie. The first natural color processes were in the 1900s and 1910s and were two color additive color processes or red and green missing primary color blue, one additive process of time was Kinemacolor. By the 1920s, subtractive color was mostly in use with such processes as Technicolor, Prizma and Multicolor, but Multicolor was mostly never in use in the late 1920s, Technicolor was mostly in use. The only one who cared to mess with Multicolor was William Fox, probably because Multicolor was more cheaper of a process and at the time in 1929 William Fox was in debt. The difference between additive color and subtractive color were that an additive color film required a special projector that could project two components of film at the same time, a green record and a red record. But additive color didn't required a special projector, the two pieces of film were chemically formed together and was projected in one strip of film.

One of the first movies to use subtractive color was a silent film titled Cupid Angling (1918). In 1932, Walt Disney made the first film to use a red, green and blue color process (Technicolor), Flowers and Trees. Three years later, the first feature length movie to be filmed entirely in 3-color Technicolor was Becky Sharp.

== 1910s ==
The first color features were made in the 1910s. The very first was With Our King and Queen Through India (1912). In 1917, Technicolor made their first film, a two-color additive film entitled The Gulf Between (1917), The Gulf Between was also the first color feature in America, but rather than being filmed in Hollywood it was actually filmed in Jacksonville Florida. Today The Gulf Between is lost.

== 1920s ==
In 1922, Technicolor made their second feature and also the first movie made in their second color process, called process 2. The movie was The Toll of the Sea. It was the first color feature made in Hollywood. The movie starred Anna May Wong. Wong never thought the movie would ever make it to the screen, but it did. In 1923, Paramount Pictures made the Cecil B. De Mille partial Technicolor epic The Ten Commandments, which would be remade 33 years later by DeMille in 1956, also in color by Technicolor. Also in 1923, Prizma was used to film the 1923 version of Vanity Fair. The third feature to be filmed entirely in color by Technicolor was Wanderer of the Wasteland, today a lost film, released in 1924. It was advertised as being filmed in 100% Natural Color. Technicolor made many more silent films in color through the years, but in 1929, the first talking picture to use a color (Technicolor) sequence was The Broadway Melody. The color hues of that sequence are lost; the sequence only survives in black-and-white television prints from the 1950s. That year, Warner Bros. made the first all color-all talking movie, On with the Show, which also only survives in black and white, with only a small fragment of surviving color, found in 2005. Later in 1929, the first color talking movies were being made, such as Paris (Warner Bros.), Rio Rita (RKO, first RKO color movie, color sequenced), Sally (Warner Bros., third all-color, all-talking feature), Gold Diggers of Broadway (Warner Bros., second all-color, all-talking feature), The Hollywood Revue (MGM's second musical, after The Broadway Melody) and many more. Most of the color talking movies made in 1929 mostly survive in 1950s black-and-white television copies or with color sequences cut. In 1929, Technicolor was so busy filming color movies that the Warner Bros. musical revue The Show of Shows (1929), which was originally going to be filmed in full color, had to be filmed only mostly in color, with 21 minutes in black and white, a seventeen-minute section of part one and a four-minute opening of part two. While most companies used Technicolor, William Fox, owner of Fox Movie Corporation, used Multicolor.

== 1930s ==
Color movies released in 1930 included The Life of the Party (Warner Bros.), Under a Texas Moon (Warner Bros.), Children of Pleasure (MGM), Chasing Rainbows (MGM), Show Girl in Hollywood (Warner Bros., one of Al Jolson's first color appearances), Viennese Nights (Warner Bros.), Hit the Deck (RKO Radio Pictures), and Leathernecking (RKO), The Cuckoos (RKO). Like 1929, the original color negatives for many movies of the year are considered lost and only survive in black-and-white due to the studios wanting more space in their film vaults so they threw away the films and aired them on black-and-white television before, but some color movies from this time have been found throughout the years.

In 1932, Walt Disney released the first three-color Technicolor film, Flowers and Trees. 1939, which is considered by many film buffs as Hollywood's greatest year, had hits in color, such as The Wizard of Oz, The Women, Dodge City and the most successful of them all, Gone with the Wind.

== Color film processes ==
Process has been explained in a 1940 publishing, and in a 2013 historic overview.

== See also ==
- List of early color feature films
- His Supreme Moment (1925)
