= Magnacolor =

Early motion picture color process

Magnacolor was a color motion picture process owned by Consolidated Film Industries. Magnacolor was an offshoot of William Van Doren Kelley's 1918 subtractive color process Prizma and utilized the same bi-pack color process. Magnacolor was succeeded at Consolidated by Trucolor.

== See also ==
- The Girl From Calgary (1932)
- The Bold Caballero (1936)
- Color motion picture film
- Color photography
- List of color film systems
- List of film formats
