= Multicolor =

Natural color motion picture process

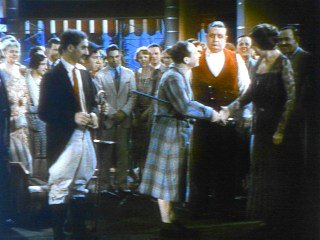
Color test footage filmed during the production of Animal Crackers (1930)

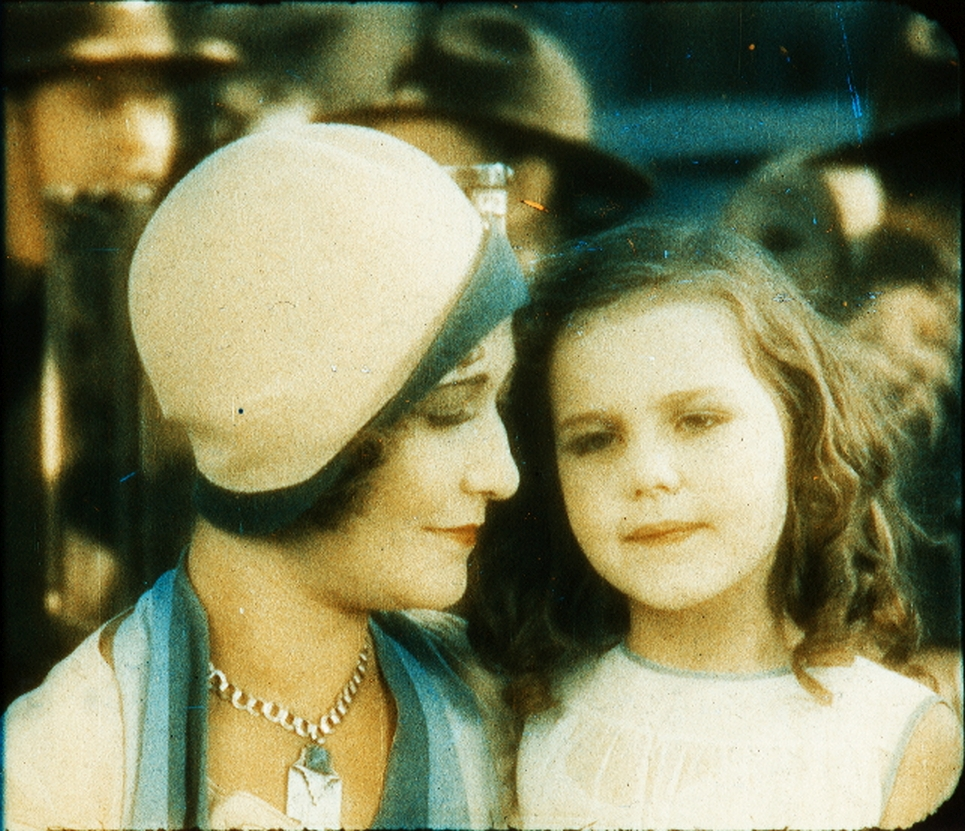
Multicolor scene from "His First Command" 1929 depicting Dorothy Sebastian and Helen Parrish

Multicolor is a subtractive two-color motion picture process. Multicolor, introduced to the motion picture industry in 1929, was based on the earlier Prizma Color process, and was the forerunner of Cinecolor.

For a Multicolor film, a scene is shot with a normal camera capable of bipacking film. Two black-and-white 35mm film negatives are threaded bipack in the camera. One records the color red (via a dyed panchromatic film), and the other, blue (orthochromatic). In printing, duplitized stock is exposed and processed with one record on each side. In a tank of toning solution, the film is floated upon the top of the solution with the appropriate chemical. The cyan record is toned a complementary red with a copper ferrocyanide solution, and the red being toned blue/cyan with ferric ferrocyanide solution.

Multicolor enjoyed brief success in early sound pictures. The following features included sequences in Multicolor: Red Hot Rhythm (1929), His First Command (1929), This Thing Called Love (1929) Sunny Side Up (1929), Married In Hollywood (1929), Fox Movietone Follies of 1929 (1929), The Great Gabbo (1929), New Movietone Follies of 1930 (1930), Good News (1930), Madam Satan (1930) and Delicious (1931). All of these features were produced by Fox Film Corporation except The Great Gabbo (Sono Art-World Wide Pictures), Red Hot Rhythm (Pathé), His First Command (Pathé), This Thing Called Love (Pathé), Good News (Metro-Goldwyn-Mayer) and Madam Satan (Metro-Goldwyn-Mayer).

A sequence in Hell's Angels (1930) was filmed in Multicolor, but printed by Technicolor, as Multicolor could not yet supply as large a demand of printings in such a short amount of time. Multicolor was also utilized in several cartoons of the era.

A 15-second, behind-the-scenes clip in Multicolor of the Marx Brothers filmed on the set of Animal Crackers (1930) exists as part of a Cinecolor short subject entitled Wonderland of California. The first feature filmed entirely in Multicolor was The Hawk (1931), which was re-released five years later in Cinecolor as Phantom of Santa Fe. In 1932, the next (and final) all Multicolor feature, Tex Takes A Holiday (1932), was released.

Howard Hughes was an early investor of Multicolor's Rowland V. Lee and William Worthington.

The Multicolor plant closed in 1932 and their equipment was bought by Cinecolor in 1933.

== See also ==
- Bipack color
- Color motion picture film
- Color photography
- List of color film systems
- List of film formats
- List of early color feature films
