= Brewster Color =

Brewster Color was an early subtractive color-model film process.

A two color process was invented by Percy Douglas Brewster in 1913, based on the earlier work of William Friese-Greene. It attempted to compensate for previous methods' problems with contrast. Brewster introduced a three color process in 1935, in an unsuccessful attempt to compete with Technicolor.

== Two color process ==
In his first patent application, filed February 11, 1913, American inventor Percy Douglas Brewster described a new color film process:

The exposure is made through a ray filter, preferably light yellow in color and adapted to cut off all the violet and ultra-violet rays of light. The green and blue light with the addition of some yellow, after passing through the ray filter, acts upon the panchromatic emulsion on the front of the film, while the red and orange light with some yellow passes through the film and acts upon the panchromatic emulsion on the back of the film. The color that the transparent emulsion is stained prevents the passage of a substantial amount of blue and green light through the film to act upon the panchromatic film on the back.

Over the next eight years, Brewster filed a series of further patents pertaining to photographic film, film development, color cinematography, and various improvements to the process. In 1917, a patent for a method of "Coloring or Dyeing Photographic Images" was issued to Hoyt Miller, chief chemist of the Brewster Color Film Corporation, and assigned to the corporation.

=== Use in motion pictures ===
Brewster's process was used for the first color animated cartoon, 1920's The Debut of Thomas Cat. However the production company, Bray Pictures, deemed the process to be too expensive, and did not employ it again.

As other color processes became available, Brewster Color continued to be preferred by some filmmakers due to its relatively low cost and greater availability for small production runs. It began to fall out of use in the late 1920s, in favor of the Prizma process.

In April 1944, a syndicate was formed to purchase the rights to the Brewster Color process and use it to produce films at studios in New York and Washington, D.C. Stanley Neal, member of the syndicate and owner of its laboratory, was mainly known for the production of industrial films and advertising shorts.

== Three color process ==
In 1935, Brewster introduced a three color process which added yellow tinting. Though demonstration films received praise from members of the Royal Photographic Society for their "remarkable steadiness" and "extraordinarily good reds", this method failed to meet with commercial success.

== Brewster v. Technicolor ==
Brewster filed a lawsuit against Technicolor, Inc. and Technicolor Motion Picture Corporation on April 1, 1941. It sought $100,000 in damages and an injunction, stating that they had infringed on patents for a "method and apparatus for color cinematography." On October 7, 1941, the judge overruled defense objections to some of the plaintiff's interrogatories. This procedural decision has been cited in some subsequent cases, as "2 F.R.D. 186, 51 U.S.P.Q. 319".

No further public filings were made by Brewster, suggesting that the case may have been settled out of court.

== See also ==
- List of color film systems
