= Tex Takes a Holiday =

1932 film

- Directed by: Alan James
- Written by: Robert Walker; Alan James
- Produced by: Robert J. Horner
- Starring: Wallace MacDonald; Virginia Brown Faire; Ben Corbett
- Cinematography: Otto Himm
- Edited by: Henry Adams
- Production company: Argosy Productions Corporation
- Distributed by: First Division Pictures
- Release date: December 2, 1932
- Running time: 60 minutes
- Country: United States
- Language: English

Tex Takes a Holiday is a 1932 American pre-Code Western film directed by Alan James and starring Wallace MacDonald, Virginia Brown Faire and Ben Corbett. It was shot in Natural color, an early process for producing color films.

== Plot ==
Cowboy Tex is wrongly accused of some crimes and sets out to hunt down the real perpetrator.

== Cast ==
- Wallace MacDonald as Tex
- Virginia Brown Faire as Dolores
- Ben Corbett as The Sidekick
- Mme. DeLatta as Saloon Madame
- Claude Payton as Saunders
- George Chesebro as Gang Leader
- Olin Francis as Henchman
- Steve Clemente as Knife-tossing Henchman
- Tom London as Sheriff
- Charles Stevens as Henchman

== Bibliography ==
- Pitts, Michael R. Western Movies: A Guide to 5,105 Feature Films. McFarland, 2012.
