= Gasparcolor =

Color motion picture film system

- Industry: Motion pictures
- Founded: 1933
- Founder: Béla Gáspár
- Defunct: 1967
- Products: Gasparcolor

Gasparcolor was a color motion picture film system, developed in Berlin in 1933 by the Hungarian chemist Béla Gáspár, (Oraviczabánya, Transylvania, Kingdom of Hungary 1898–1973). It used a subtractive 3-color process on a single film strip, one of the earliest to do so.

During the 1930s and 1940s, it was used primarily in animation, notably by Oskar Fischinger (Muratti Gets in the Act, 1934; Composition in Blue, 1935), Len Lye (Birth of a Robot, Rainbow Dance, both 1936), and George Pal. It also saw use in live-action film, including "Colour on the Thames" (1935).

William Moritz’s article, from his lecture at the Louvre, Paris, gives more detail about this history of this color process. Because of the darkening political climate in Europe, his Hungarian-Jewish wife Elly Tardos-Taussig (Szeged 1908-) died by suicide; Gaspar eventually moved to Hollywood and sold his patents to Technicolor and 3M.

== See also ==
- Studio system
