= Rainbow Dance =

- Opening titles
- Directed by: Len Lye
- Written by: Len Lye
- Produced by: Basil Charles Wright; Alberto Cavalcanti
- Starring: Rupert Doone
- Cinematography: Frank Jones
- Music by: Rico's Creole Band
- Distributed by: GPO Film Unit
- Release date: 1936
- Running time: 4 minutes
- Country: United Kingdom
- Language: English

Rainbow Dance is a 1936 British animated colour film, directed and written by New Zealand-born animator Len Lye. It was commissioned by the British Post Office, produced by the GPO Film Unit and was filmed using the Gasparcolor process.

== Synopsis ==
A man is holding an umbrella in the rain. Then, he starts dancing, and as he does, the backgrounds completely change. Then, he starts dancing near the ocean, with a woman and fish following. Then, he plays tennis with cel-animated circles as another man watches. A colorful array of shapes follow, and the man sits and thinks, as the shapes come back and images come off the score sheet. The music ends, and a man's voice says: "Post Office Savings Bank puts a pot of gold at the end of the rainbow for you", followed by "No deposit is too small for the Post Office Savings Bank".

== Cast ==
- Rupert Doone as dancer

== Reception ==
Len Lye, while using figures in silhouette, is still moving freely in an abstract world of his own imagination.

== Home media ==
The film is included on the DVD We Live in Two Worlds: The GPO Film Unit Collection Volume 2.
