= William Thomas Crespinel =

William Thomas Crespinel (9 July 1890 – 19 June 1987) was the inventor of a bipack process, which allowed any cinematic camera to shoot color film. In 1932 he developed Cinecolor.

== Biography ==
He was born in Weymouth, England on 9 July 1890. He experimented with early color photography as a teenager. In 1906 he joined Kinemacolor. In 1932 he developed Cinecolor and started a company to sell the process, making himself president. He retired as president of Cinecolor in 1948. He died in 1987 in Laguna Beach, California.
