= Prizma =

Color motion picture process (1913, 1917–24)

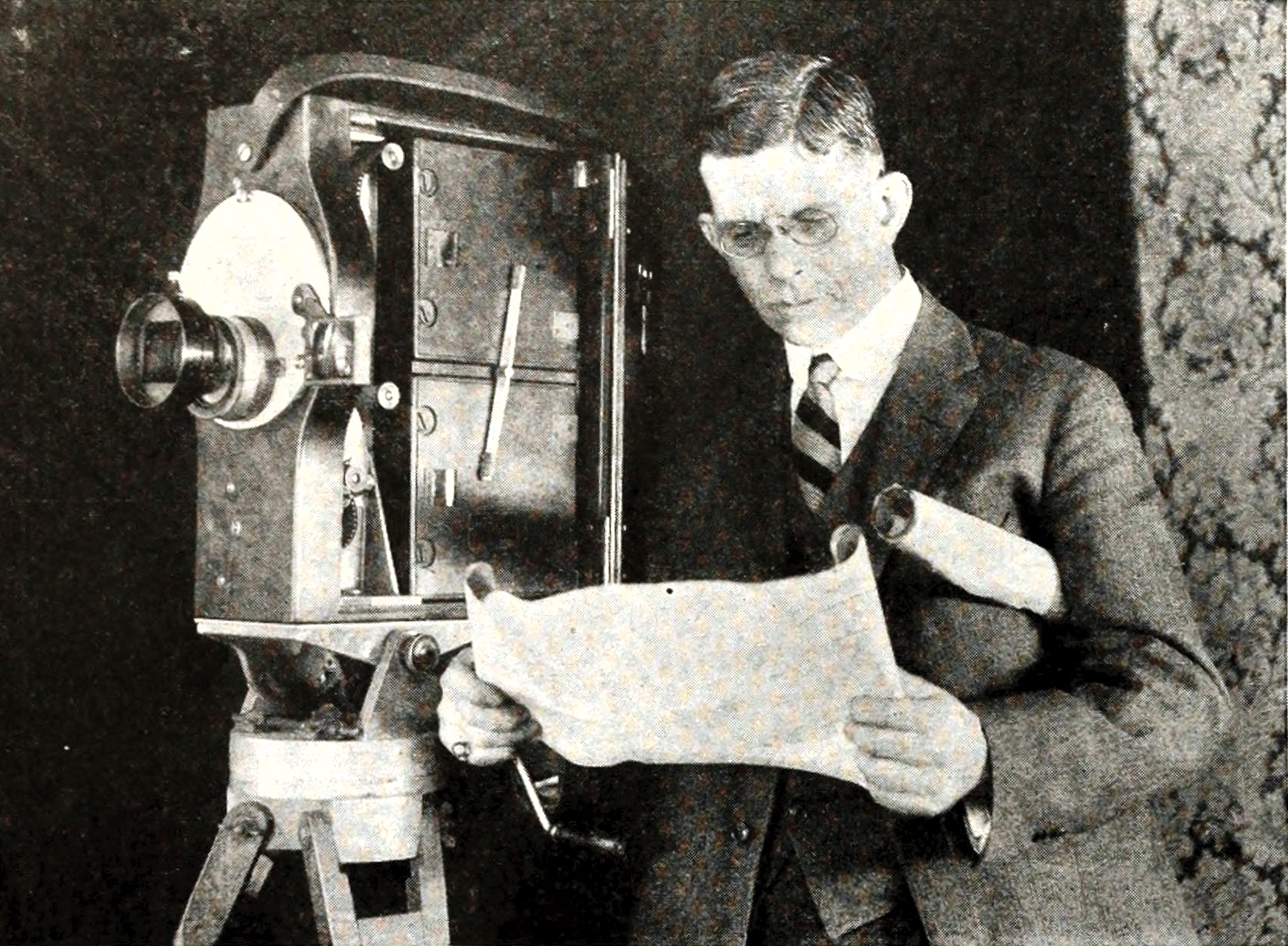
William Van Doren Kelley and his invention, the Prizma color camera.

The Prizma Color system was a color motion picture process, invented in 1913 by William Van Doren Kelley and Charles Raleigh. Initially, it was a two-color additive color system, similar to its predecessor, Kinemacolor. Kelley eventually transformed Prizma into a bi-pack color system that itself became the predecessor for future color processes such as Multicolor and Cinecolor.

== Experimental ==
Prizma gave a demonstration of color motion pictures in 1917 that used an additive four-color process, using a disk of four filters acting on a single strip of panchromatic film in the camera. The colors were red, yellow, green, and blue, with overlapping wavelengths to prevent pulsating effects on the screen with vivid colors. The film was photographed at 26 to 32 frames per second, and projected at 32 frame/s. The disk used in projection consisted mainly of two colors, red-orange and blue-green, adapted to the four-color process by the superimposition of two small magenta filters over one of the red sectors and two similar blue filters over one of the blue-green sectors. Motion Picture News reported,

The results by this process are characterized by extreme delicacy of color, and subdued shades are most admirably rendered.… The blue-green element of the projecting filter appears to favor the blue rather than the green, and as a result, skies and water are well reproduced. We have not noticed anything approaching a true green in any of the subjects so far exhibited, although this is probably by reason of the fact that no prominent greens existed in the subjects photographed. Yellow is not in evidence in the current Prizma films, although a wide variety of warm tones are apparent, ranging from chestnut-brown to a deep red-orange. Colors in full saturation are hardly within the scope of this process.

== Prizma I (additive) ==
The first commercial system of Prizma was similar to Kinemacolor in that the camera took alternating frames of red-orange and blue-green colors through color filters placed within the camera's shutter. Projection involved running a colored disc again in synchronization with the black and white color record film, and through persistence of vision, the two frames combined on the screen to form a color image.

The first film shown in Prizma color was the feature Our Navy at the 44th Street Theatre in New York City on 23 December 1917. General reception to the system was positive, but the rotating filter wheel technique proved impractical. To counteract the issue of having a special projector with a filter wheel, Kelley began tinting alternate frames of his film red and green. However, fringeing, flicker, and light loss were major issues which plagued not only Prizma, but also all of the other additive systems of the Kinemacolor nature.

In counteracting this, Kelley had filed a patent in February 1917 which proved to be the foundation of Prizma's second color system.

== Prizma II (subtractive) ==
On 28 December 1918, Kelley announced that Prizma would release a color film (usually a short) every week, a film which would be projectable on any standard projector. Kelley's idea was two years in the making, but was a valid one which became the springboard for all future color systems to follow – two films were filmed simultaneously with a camera of his own design. One strip was sensitive to red-orange, the other to blue-green (cyan). Both negatives were processed and printed on duplitized film, and then each emulsion was toned its complementary color, red or blue. The final result was a color image that was subtractive in nature – no flicker and a bright projection. But as a result of the way the camera was designed, a constant fringe was apparent, as the strips were being recorded side-by-side.

In January 1919, this new process was premiered at the Rivoli Theatre in New York City with the short Everywhere With Prizma. Kelley, based in Jersey City, New Jersey, was a friend of the Rivoli's manager and music director Hugo Riesenfeld and so did business with Samuel Roxy Rothafel's Roxy Theaters chain, which the Rivoli was part of.

In February 1921, another Prizma film, Bali, the Unknown was premiered at Roxy's Capitol Theatre in New York. The four-reel feature garnered lukewarm reviews, but enough positive audience response that more films were produced in the system.

The Prizma process only took off in 1922, when J. Stuart Blackton of Vitagraph Studios shot his feature film The Glorious Adventure in Prizma. The film, starring Diana Manners and Victor McLaglen, premiered in April 1922 to lukewarm success in the US, but much appeal in the UK. With the prestige of a Vitagraph production, Prizma was considered the apex of color photography at that point in motion picture producers' minds.

Prizma sued the Technicolor Corporation in September 1922 on the grounds that Technicolor was infringing upon Prizma's patents. However, Prizma eventually lost the case.

In April 1923, Robert Flaherty took both a black-and-white camera and a Prizma color camera to Samoa, hoping to film part of his documentary film Moana (1925) in that process, but the Prizma camera malfunctioned and no color footage was shot. (Moana became famous as the second feature film shot using panchromatic black-and-white film rather than orthochromatic.)

== Work in 3D film ==
With Harry K. Fairall and Robert F. Elder's 3D feature, The Power of Love, opening 27 September 1922 in Los Angeles and the December 1922 unveiling of Laurens Hammond's Teleview system in New York City, Kelley used his Prizma camera for stereoscopic purposes. As his camera took side-by-side pictures, Kelley mounted a set of prisms on his rig, thus expanding his point of convergence, and utilized his red/blue color system to make an anaglyphic print of his product. His final product was the first of Kelley's Plasticon Pictures entitled Movies of the Future, which was premiered at the Rivoli on 24 December 1922. The film consisted largely of shots of New York City, including Times Square, the New York Public Library, and Luna Park.

Based on the success of Movies of the Future, Kelley had his chief photographer, William T. Crispinel, shoot another short film entitled Through the Trees – Washington D.C. in the spring of 1923. The film was not shot with the Prizma rig – which was being used by Flaherty in Samoa – but with one designed by Frederic E. Ives, a technician specializing in 3D photography. Although the short was technically shot better, Riesenfeld rejected it because it did not have the 3D gimmicks that the recent films of that nature included.

== Decline ==
The last few years of Prizma were somewhat fruitful. Samuel Goldwyn produced Vanity Fair (1923) in Prizma, and D. W. Griffith utilized the process in a couple of his films, including a scene in Way Down East (1920). Flames of Passion (1922), directed by Graham Cutts and starring Mae Marsh and C. Aubrey Smith; The Virgin Queen (1923), directed by J. Stuart Blackton; and I Pagliacci (1923), co-starring Lillian Hall-Davis, were all UK productions with one reel filmed in Prizma.

One of the last films using Prizma was Venus of the South Seas (1924), starring Annette Kellerman, where Prizma was used for one reel of a 55-minute film. Venus was restored by the Library of Congress in 2004.

In 1928, Prizma was bought by Consolidated Film Industries and was reintroduced as Magnacolor (and later Trucolor). Kelley, who held many patents in color photography, sold his patents and equipment to Cinecolor, which benefited from Kelley's advanced printing techniques. Cinecolor was co-founded by Kelley's former photographer, William T. Crispinel.

== List of films made in Prizma Color ==
- An Afternoon With Nanki San (1921)
- Arabian Duet (1922)
- Artist's Paradise (1921)
- Bali, the Unknown (1921)
- Beautiful Things (1920)
- Bird Island (1919)
- Broadway Rose (1922)
- Butterflies (1921)
- Canoe and Campfire (1919)
- Capetown (1922)
- Catalonian Pyrenees (1919)
- China (1919)
- Children of the Netherlands (1919)
- Color Sketches (1922)
- Color-Land Review (1919)
- The Cost of Carelessness (1920)
- Danse Arabe (1922)
- Danse du Ventre (1921)
- Dawning (1921)
- Everywhere With Prizma (1919)
- Fashion Hints (1922)
- Flames of Passion (UK, 1922)
- Florida Sports (1919)
- From the Land of the Incas (1920)
- Gardens of Normandy (1921)
- The Gilded Lily (1921)
- Glacier Park (1919)
- The Glorious Adventure (UK, 1922)
- Gowns Venus Would Envy, starring Edith Varian Cockcroft (1919)
- Hagopian the Rug Maker (1920)
- Hawaii (1919)
- Hawaiian Islands (1920)
- Heart of the Sky Mountains (1920)
- Heidi (Heidi of the Alps) (1920)
- Here and There (1919)
- The Heritage of the Red Man (1922)
- I Pagliacci (UK, 1923)
- Ice Fields, Glaciers, and the Birth of Bergs (1919)
- The Impi (1922)
- In Nippon (1920)
- In School Days (1920)
- An Indian Summer (1921)
- Japan (1921)
- Japanese Fishing Village (1920)
- Kilauea-The Hawaiian Volcano (1918)
- The Land of the Great Spirit (1919)
- Lest We Forget (1922)
- A Little Love Nest (1922)
- Lure of Alaska (1919)
- Magic Gems (1921)
- Marimba Land (1920)
- May Days (1920)
- Memories (1919)
- The Message of the Flowers (1921)
- Mining in Alaska (1919)
- The Mirror (1923)
- Model Girls (1919)
- Moonlight Sonata (1922)
- Neighbor Nelly (1921)
- Oahu (1919)
- Oases of the Sahara (1923)
- Old Faithful (1919)
- Our Navy (Our Invincible Navy) (1918)
- Out of the Sea (1919)
- Picturesque Japan (1919)
- Pinto's Prizma Comedy Revue (1919)
- A Prizma Color Visit to Catalina (1919)
- The Refreshing Riviera (1920)
- Rheims (1921)
- The Sacred City of the Desert (1921)
- The Sno-Birds (1921)
- So This Is London (1922)
- Sunbeams (1923)
- Sunshine Gatherers (1921)
- Swaziland South Africa (1920)
- Teddy in Glacier Land (1922)
- Vanity Fair (1923)
- Venus of the South Seas (1924) final film made in Prizma
- The Virgin Queen (UK, 1923)
- La Voix du Rossignol (France, 1924) directed by Ladislas Starevich
- Way Down East (1920) directed by D. W. Griffith
- Way Up Yonder (1920)
- Where Poppies Bloom (1923)
- Wonderful Water (1922)

== See also ==
- Color motion picture film
- Color photography
- List of early color feature films
- List of color film systems
- List of film formats
- List of motion picture film stocks
- Technicolor
- RG color space
