= Photographic emulsion =

Layer in photographic film

Photographic emulsion is a light-sensitive colloid used in film-based photography. Most commonly, in silver-gelatin photography, it consists of silver halide crystals dispersed in gelatin. The emulsion is usually coated onto a substrate of glass, films (of cellulose nitrate, cellulose acetate or polyester), paper, or fabric. The substrate is often flexible and known as a film base.

Photographic emulsion is not a true emulsion, but a suspension of solid particles (silver halide) in a fluid (gelatin in solution). However, the word emulsion is customarily used in a photographic context. Gelatin or gum arabic layers sensitized with dichromate used in the dichromated colloid processes carbon and gum bichromate are sometimes called emulsions. Some processes do not have emulsions, such as platinum, cyanotype, salted paper, or kallitype.

== Components ==
Photographic emulsion is a fine suspension of insoluble light-sensitive crystals in a colloid sol, usually consisting of gelatin. The light-sensitive component is one or a mixture of silver halides: silver bromide, chloride and iodide. The gelatin is used as a permeable binder, allowing processing agents (e.g., developer, fixer, toners, etc.) in aqueous solution to enter the colloid without dislodging the crystals. Other polymer macromolecules are often blended, but gelatin has not been entirely replaced. The light-exposed crystals are reduced by the developer to black metallic silver particles that form the image. Color films and papers have multiple layers of emulsion, made sensitive to different parts of the visible spectrum by different color sensitizers, and incorporating different dye couplers which produce superimposed yellow, magenta and cyan dye images during development. Panchromatic black-and-white film also includes color sensitizers, but as part of a single emulsion layer.

== Manufacture ==
A solution of silver nitrate is mixed into a warm gelatin solution containing potassium bromide, sodium chloride or other alkali metal halides. A reaction precipitates fine crystals of insoluble silver halides that are light-sensitive. The silver halide is actually being 'peptized' by the gelatin. The type and quantity of gelatin used influences the final emulsion's properties. A pH buffer, crystal habit modifier, metal dopants, ripener, ripening restrainer, surfactants, defoamer, emulsion stabilizer and biocide are also used in emulsion making.

Most modern emulsions are "washed" to remove some of the reaction byproducts (potassium nitrate and excess salts). The "washing" or desalting step can be performed by ultrafiltration, dialysis, coagulation (using acylated gelatin), or a classic noodle washing method.

Emulsion making also incorporates steps to increase sensitivity by using chemical sensitizing agents and sensitizing dyes.

== See also ==
- Nuclear emulsion
- Tintype
- Photoresist
