= The Bold Caballero =

1936 film by Wells Root

- Theatrical release poster
- Directed by: Wells Root
- Written by: Wells Root
- Produced by: Nat Levine
- Starring: Robert Livingston; Heather Angel; Sig Ruman; Robert Warwick; Emily Fitzroy
- Cinematography: Jack A. Marta; Alvin Wyckoff
- Edited by: Lester Orlebeck
- Music by: Karl Hajos
- Production company: Republic Pictures
- Distributed by: Republic Pictures
- Release date: December 1, 1936
- Running time: 67 minutes
- Country: United States
- Language: English

The Bold Caballero is a 1936 American Western film written and directed by Wells Root. It is based on the character Zorro, created by Johnston McCulley. The characters Don Alejandro Vega (Don Diego's father) and Bernardo (Don Diego's mute manservant) are notably absent. Native American stars include Chief Thundercloud as Don Diego Vega/Zorro's aide and Charles Stevens as Captain Vargas. John Merton appears uncredited in this film as a First Sergeant. Merton also appears in Zorro's Fighting Legion as Manuel and Zorro's Black Whip as Harris.

The Bold Caballero is notable for being the first talking Zorro film, as the first two Zorro films (1920's The Mark of Zorro and 1925's Don Q, Son of Zorro) were silent films, and the first Zorro film in color (Magnacolor). It was shot in Chatsworth, Los Angeles. The film was released on December 1, 1936, by Republic Pictures.

== Plot ==
Zorro has been captured and set for execution, charged with the murder of the new Governor in Spanish California, as the governor was marked with a "Z". Zorro escapes, and reveals his identity to the governor's daughter, Isabella. However, Isabella then has Don Diego arrested. He convinces Isabella that the Commandante was the real killer, as the "Z" on the Governor was backwards. Eventually, Isabella helps free Don Diego, the Commandante is killed, and Diego and Isabella are reunited.

== Cast ==
- Robert Livingston as Don Diego Vega/Zorro
- Heather Angel as Lady Isabella Palma
- Sig Ruman as Commandante Sebastian Golle
- Ian Wolfe as The Priest
- Robert Warwick as Governor Palma
- Emily Fitzroy as Lady Isabella's chaperone
- Charles Stevens as Captain Vargas
- Walter Long as Guard
- Ferdinand Munier as Landlord
- Chris-Pin Martin as Hangman
- Carlos De Valdez as The Alcalde
- Soledad Jiménez as Indian woman

== See also ==
- List of early color feature films
