= Consolidated Film Industries =

Film processing laboratory in Los Angeles, California, US

- Company type: Privately held company
- Industry: Film
- Founded: 1924
- Defunct: 2008
- Headquarters: California, United States

Consolidated Film Industries was a film laboratory and film processing company and was one of the leading film laboratories in the Los Angeles area for many decades. CFI processed negatives and made prints for motion pictures and television. The company and its employees received many Academy Awards for scientific or technical achievements.

CFI was incorporated in New York in March 1924 by Herbert Yates. It was reincorporated in Delaware in 1927 by the merger of several earlier companies, including Republic Laboratories, which Yates bought in 1918, and the Allied Film Laboratories Association, which he formed in 1919.

The prospectus stated that Consolidated Film Industries, Inc. of Delaware was being incorporated to succeed a Company of a similar name formed in March 1924 under the laws of New York, for developing of motion picture negatives, printing the necessary positives and delivering the positives as instructed by the motion picture producers or distributors, thus rendering an essential service to the motion picture industry. The Company was said to operate six plants, known in the motion picture business as "laboratories", in New York, New Jersey, and California. One of these acquired properties was the Biograph Studios film laboratory facilities in the Bronx, New York.

Consolidated Film Industries, Inc., was the largest concern of its kind and was at one time the largest purchaser of motion picture film in the world. The business was said to have been built upon the sound foundation of quality and service at a price, in most instances, below the motion picture producer's own laboratory cost. It was claimed that this low price was made possible through the Company's efficient and large-scale operations.

Motion picture and television films that used the company's color processing typically referred to the company only by its initials, the credit usually reading "Color by CFI". For a time in the late 1980s, CFI was jokingly said to stand for "Can't Find It" or 'C.F.I. Care'.

Gladys Pearl Baker, the mother of Marilyn Monroe, worked for Consolidated as a negative film cutter; Monroe's biological father is believed to have been fellow Consolidated employee Charles Stanley Gifford.

According to a news item on the front page of the Brooklyn Daily Eagle, on October 24, 1929, the laboratories of Consolidated Film Industries in Hollywood were destroyed by an explosion and fire. One man was killed, and motion picture films worth millions of dollars were lost.

Consolidated Film Industries acquired Prizmacolor in 1928 and was acquired by Technicolor, Inc. in 2000. Over time Technicolor operated both the Universal City lab and CFI's lab in Hollywood, but as demand decreased, the decision was made to shut down CFI. Technicolor ceased operations in Universal City as a film laboratory in 2008.

The original CFI building at 959 Seward Street in Hollywood had been the company's home for more than 60 years. After the structure was demolished, the lot lay vacant for many years before a low-rise office complex was constructed in 2014.

== Scientific or Technical Academy Awards ==
- 1956: To Ted Hirsch, Carl Hauge and Edward Reichard of Consolidated Film Industries for an automatic scene counter for laboratory projection rooms. (Class III award)
- 1960: To Carl Hauge, Robert Grubel and Edward Reichard of Consolidated Film Industries for the development of an automatic developer replenisher system. (Class III award)
- 1964: To Sidney P. Solow, Eduard H. Reichard, Carl Hauge, and Job Sanderson of "Consolidated Film Industries" for the Design and Use of a 3-Head Color Release Printer for A & B Composite Color Printing" (Class II award)
- 1964: To Edward H. Reichard and Carl W. Hauge of Consolidated Film Industries for the design of a Proximity Cue Detector and its application to motion picture printers. (Class III award)
- 1964: To Edward H. Reichard, Leonard L. Sokolow and Carl W. Hauge of Consolidated Film Industries for the design and application to motion picture laboratory practice of a Stroboscopic Scene Tester for color and black-and-white film. (Class III award)
- 1968: To Carl W. Hauge and Edward H. Reichard of Consolidated Film Industries and E. Michael Meahl and Roy J. Ridenour of Ramtronics for engineering an automatic exposure control for printing-machine lamps. (Class III award)
- 1968: To EASTMAN KODAK COMPANY for a new direct positive film and to Consolidated Film Industries for the application of this film to the making of post-production work prints.
- 1971: To Producers Service Corporation and Consolidated Film Industries; and to Cinema Research Corporation and Research Products, Inc. for the engineering and implementation of fully automated blow-up motion picture printing systems. (Class III award)

== See also ==
- Cinema Research Corporation
- American Record Corporation
