= The Glorious Adventure (1922 film) =

1922 film by J. Stuart Blackton

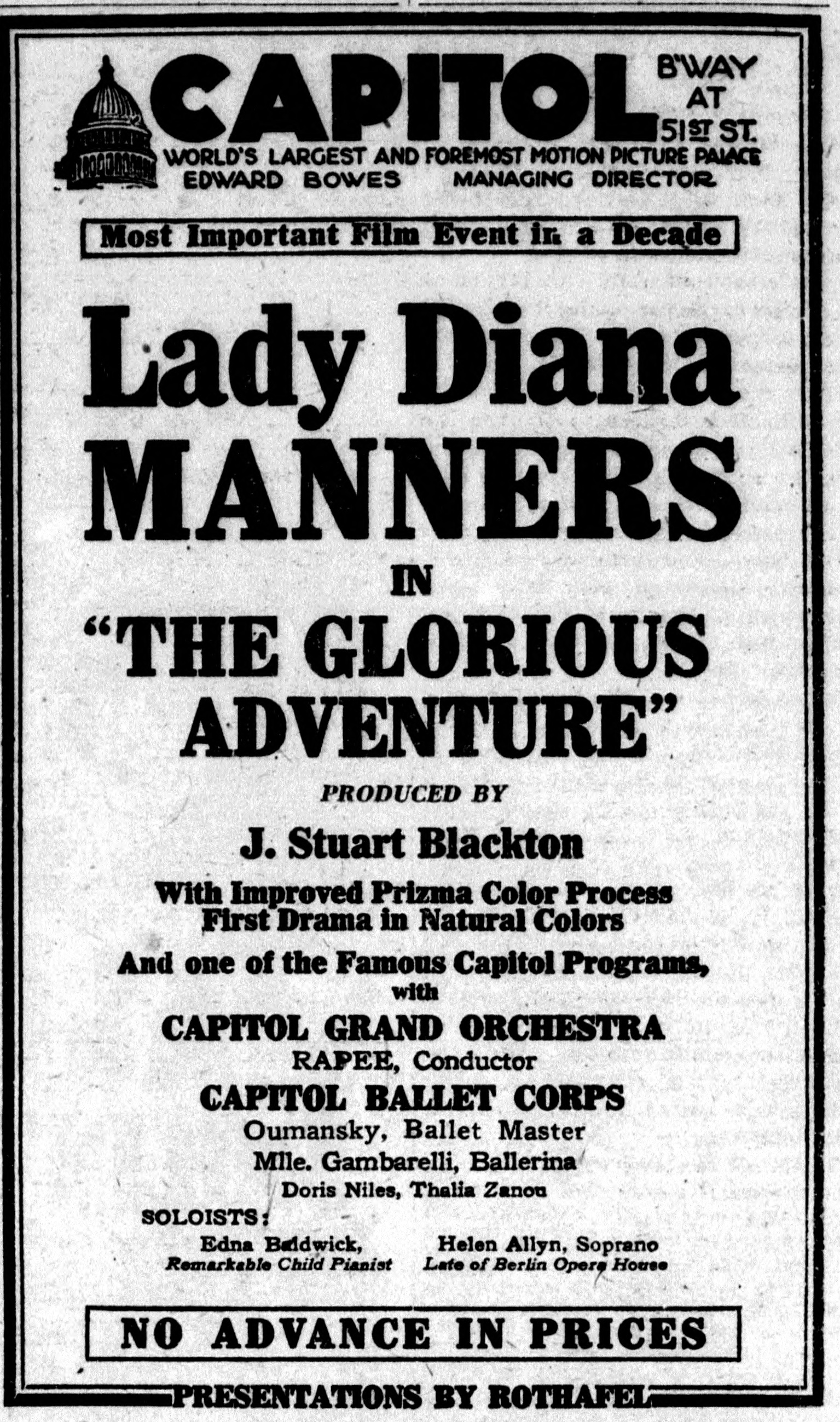
- Contemporary advertisement for the film in a New York City newspaper
- Directed by: J. Stuart Blackton
- Written by: J. Stuart Blackton; Felix Orman; Nicholas Musuraca (titles)
- Produced by: J. Stuart Blackton
- Starring: Diana Manners; Gerald Lawrence; Cecil Humphreys; Victor McLaglen; Miss Marjorie Day 1887-1940
- Cinematography: William T. Crespinel
- Production company: J. Stuart Blackton Productions
- Distributed by: Stoll Film Studios (UK)
- Release date: 23 April 1922 (UK)
- Running time: 70 minutes
- Country: United Kingdom
- Language: Silent (English intertitles)

The Glorious Adventure (1922) by James Stuart Blackton

The Glorious Adventure is a 1922 British Prizmacolor silent feature film directed by J. Stuart Blackton and written by Felix Orman. The film's sets were designed by Walter Murton. It was shot at the Cricklewood Studios of Stoll Pictures in London.

== Plot ==
Hugh Argyle, a lad of about 14 years, leaves home and bids goodbye to his sweetheart, the Lady Beatrice Fair, and promises to treasure the locket she has given him. Years later he returns after being notified that he is heir to vast estates and a title. He sends word of his coming to Lady Beatrice, now a young woman.

On the boat, Walter Roderick plans to have Hugh killed and to take his place himself. His henchman Bulfinch stabs Hugh and throws him overboard. Roderick then betrays his hireling and Bulfinch is taken to England in chains, vowing revenge on Roderick.

The Lady Beatrice is forced to entertain King Charles II of England, who takes a fancy to her. Nell Gwyn, who is one of the guests, is a bit rough and engages in rude pranks whenever the occasion arises.

Roderick, believing Hugh dead, claims his estates, being aided by a rascally solicitor. He bows to Lady Beatrice, who cannot believe that this man is really Hugh. Forced to journey to London, Lady Beatrice stops at an inn where Roderick is staying. Hugh turns up and not only puts up an excellent fight with Roderick, but with half a dozen blades. Lady Beatrice falls in love with him, but, for some unknown reason, Hugh does not make known his identity.

After much plotting and counter-plotting, Hugh is in London to marry Lady Beatrice when he encounters Roderick and is made his prisoner. She, fearing imprisonment for her debt, marries Bulfinch, who is condemned to die on the marrow. The Great Fire of London (1666) breaks out, and Bulfinch escapes and seeks the Lady Beatrice. He carries her all over London, through flames and over debris, looking for a safe place. Hugh appears and they are trapped until Bulfinch saves them, claiming Lady Beatrice as a bride. Just as it appears to be the darkest for the two lovers, Mrs. Bullfinch and several children appear, and he leaves with his family.

== Cast ==
- Miss Marjorie Day as the Gypsy
- Diana Manners as Lady Beatrice Fair
- Gerald Lawrence as Hugh Argyle
- Cecil Humphreys as Walter Roderick
- Victor McLaglen as Bulfinch
- Alice Crawford as Stephanie Dangerfield
- Lois Sturt as Nell Gwyn
- William Luff as King Charles II
- Fred E. Wright as Humpty
- Flora le Breton as Rosemary
- Lennox Pawle as Samuel Pepys
- Haidee Wright as Mrs. Bullfinch
- Rudolph De Cordova as Thomas Unwin
- Lawford Davidson as Lord Fitzroy
- Rosalie Heath as Catherine of Braganza
- Gertrude Sterroll as Duchess Constance of Moreland
- Tom Coventry as Leclerc
- Jeff Barlow as The King's chief valet
- John Marlborough East as The King's major domo
- Phyllis Clare as Court Lady (uncredited)
- Lettice Fairfax as Court Lady (uncredited)
- Hetta Bartlett as Court Lady (uncredited)

== Production background ==
The film was made entirely in Prizmacolor, and starred Lady Diana Manners, Gerald Lawrence, Cecil Humphreys, and Victor McLaglen. It was released by United Artists. Alma Reville, later married to Alfred Hitchcock, may have co-written the script as well as acting as "script girl".

Neither this film, nor the 1918 film of the same name produced by Samuel Goldwyn, is related to the famous book The Glorious Adventure (1927) by Richard Halliburton.

== Preservation status ==
The Glorious Adventure survives in its entirety, and is available on YouTube:

== See also ==
- List of early color feature films

== Bibliography ==
- Anthony Slide. A Special Relationship: Britain Comes to Hollywood and Hollywood Comes to Britain. University Press of Mississippi, 2015.
