= Additive color =

Model for predicting color created by mixing visible light

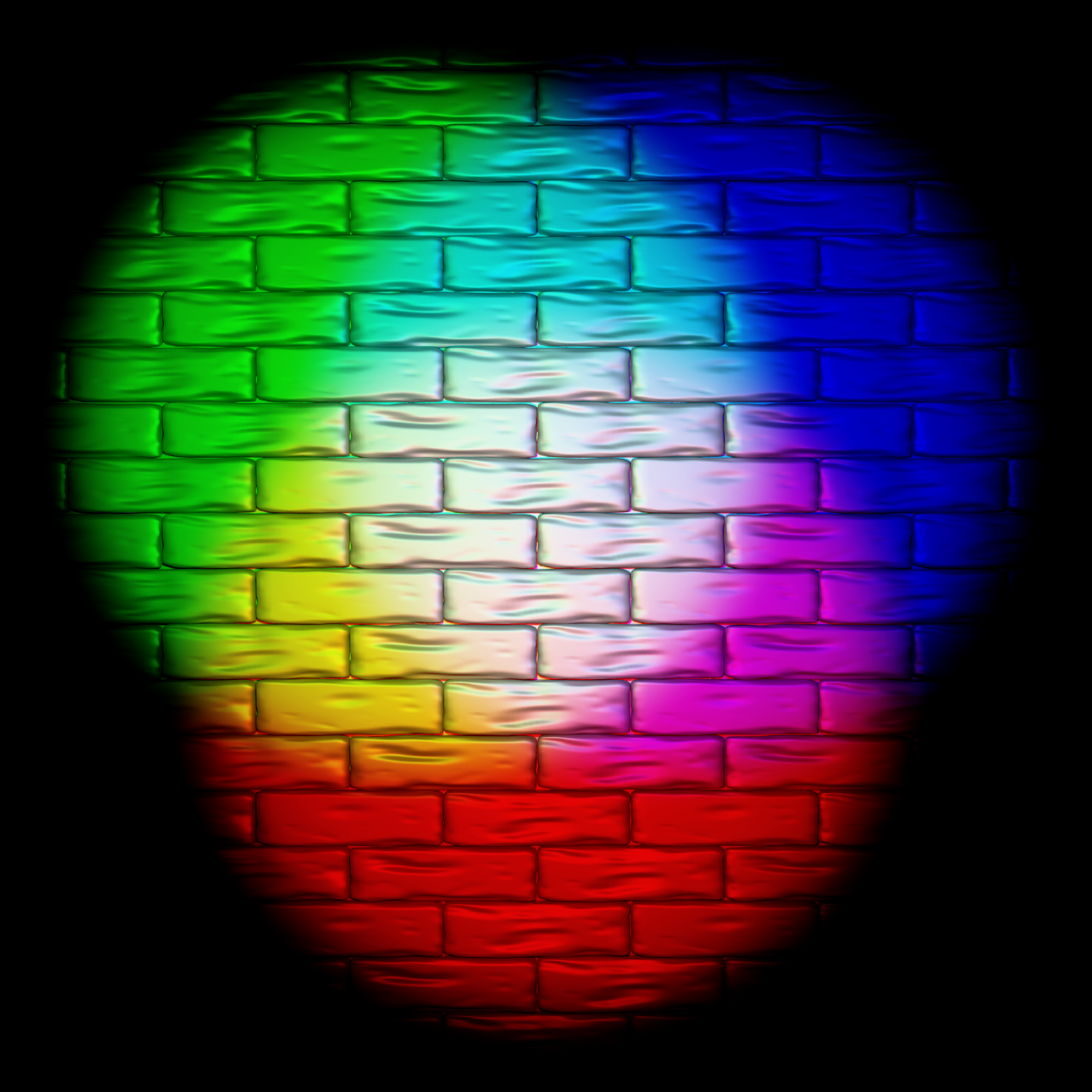
Red, green, and blue lights combining by reflecting from a white wall: secondary colors yellow, cyan, and magenta are found at the intersections of red and green, green and blue, and blue and red. The intersection of all three primary colors together yields white.

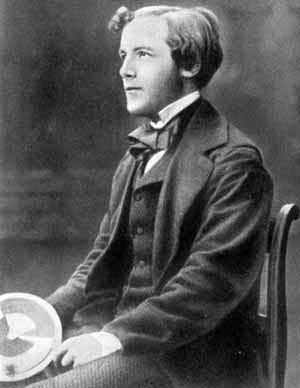
James Clerk Maxwell, with his color top that he used for investigation of color vision and additive color

Additive color or additive mixing is a property of a color model that predicts the appearance of colors made by coincident component lights, i.e. the perceived color can be predicted by summing the numeric representations of the component colors. Modern formulations of Grassmann's laws describe the additivity in the color perception of light mixtures in terms of algebraic equations. Additive color predicts perception and not any sort of change in the photons of light themselves. These predictions are only applicable in the limited scope of color matching experiments where viewers match small patches of uniform color isolated against a gray or black background.

Additive color models are applied in the design and testing of electronic displays that are used to render realistic images containing diverse sets of color using phosphors that emit light of a limited set of primary colors. Examination with a sufficiently powerful magnifying lens will reveal that each pixel in CRT, LCD, and most other types of color video displays is composed of red, green, and blue light-emitting phosphors which appear as a variety of single colors when viewed from a normal distance.

Additive color, alone, does not predict the appearance of mixtures of printed color inks, dye layers in color photographs on film, or paint mixtures. Instead, subtractive color is used to model the appearance of pigments or dyes, such as those in paints and inks.

The combination of two of the common three additive primary colors in equal proportions produces an additive secondary color—cyan, magenta or yellow. Additive color is also used to predict colors from overlapping projected colored lights often used in theatrical lighting for plays, concerts, circus shows, and night clubs.

The full gamut of color available in any additive color system is defined by all the possible combinations of all the possible luminosities of each primary color in that system. In chromaticity space, a gamut is a plane convex polygon with corners at the primaries. For three primaries, it is a triangle.

== History ==
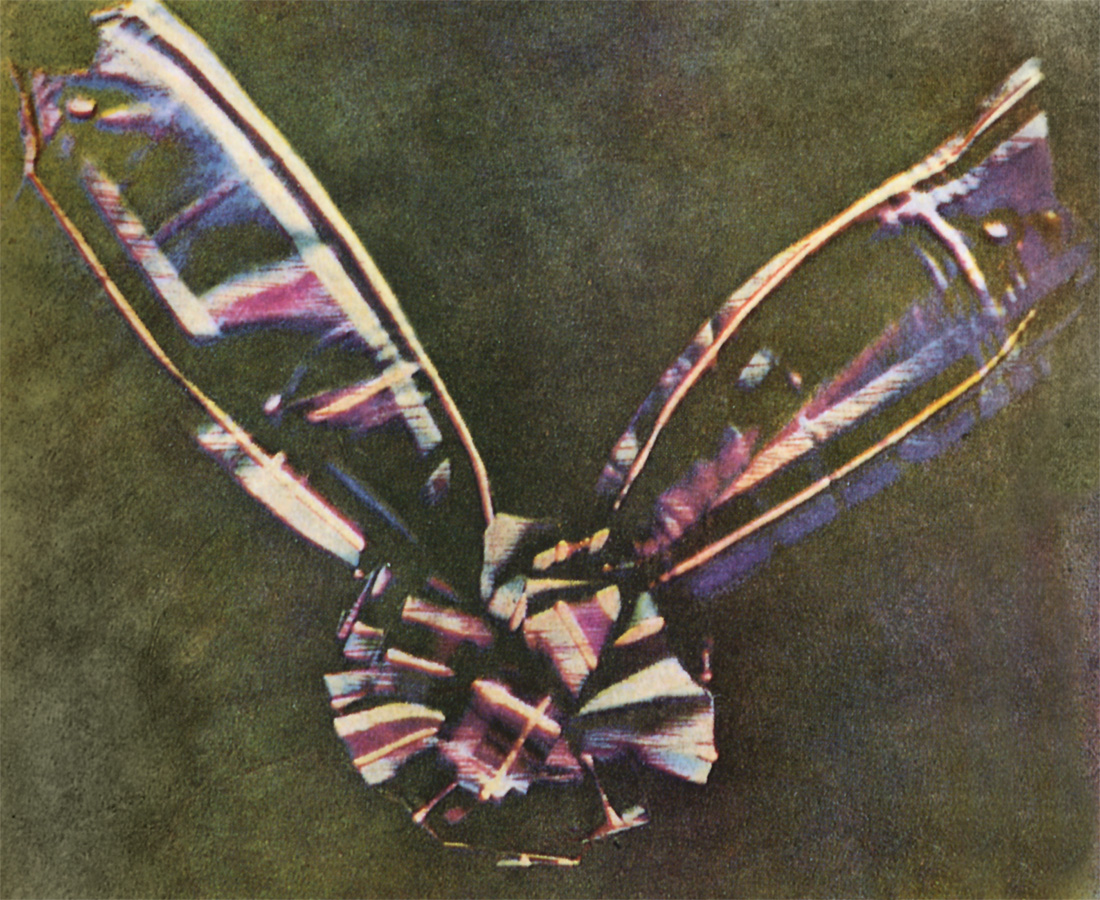
The first permanent color photograph, taken by Thomas Sutton, under the direction of James Clerk Maxwell in 1861

Systems of additive color are motivated by the Young–Helmholtz theory of trichromatic color vision, which was articulated around 1850 by Hermann von Helmholtz, based on earlier work by Thomas Young. For his experimental work on the subject, James Clerk Maxwell is sometimes credited as being the father of additive color. He had the photographer Thomas Sutton photograph a tartan ribbon on black-and-white film three times, first with a red, then green, then blue color filter over the lens. The three black-and-white images were developed and then projected onto a screen with three different projectors, each equipped with the corresponding red, green, or blue color filter used to take its image. When brought into alignment, the three images (a black-and-red image, a black-and-green image and a black-and-blue image) formed a full-color image, thus demonstrating the principles of additive color.

== See also ==
Additive color mixing with CD covers

- Color mixing
- Color space
- Color theory
- Color motion picture film
- Kinemacolor
- Prizma Color
- RGB color model
- Subtractive color
- Technicolor
- William Friese-Greene
