= Panchromatic film =

Black-and-white photographic film sensitive to the whole visible light spectrum

A panchromatic emulsion is a type of photographic emulsion that is sensitive to all wavelengths of visible light, and produces a monochrome photograph—typically black and white. Most modern commercially available film is panchromatic, and the technology is usually contrasted with earlier methods that cannot register all wavelengths, especially orthochromatic film.

In digital imaging, a panchromatic sensor is an image sensor or array of sensors that combine the visible spectrum with non-visible wavelengths, such as ultraviolet or infrared. Images produced are also black and white, and the system is used for its ability to produce higher resolution images than standard digital sensors.

== Description ==
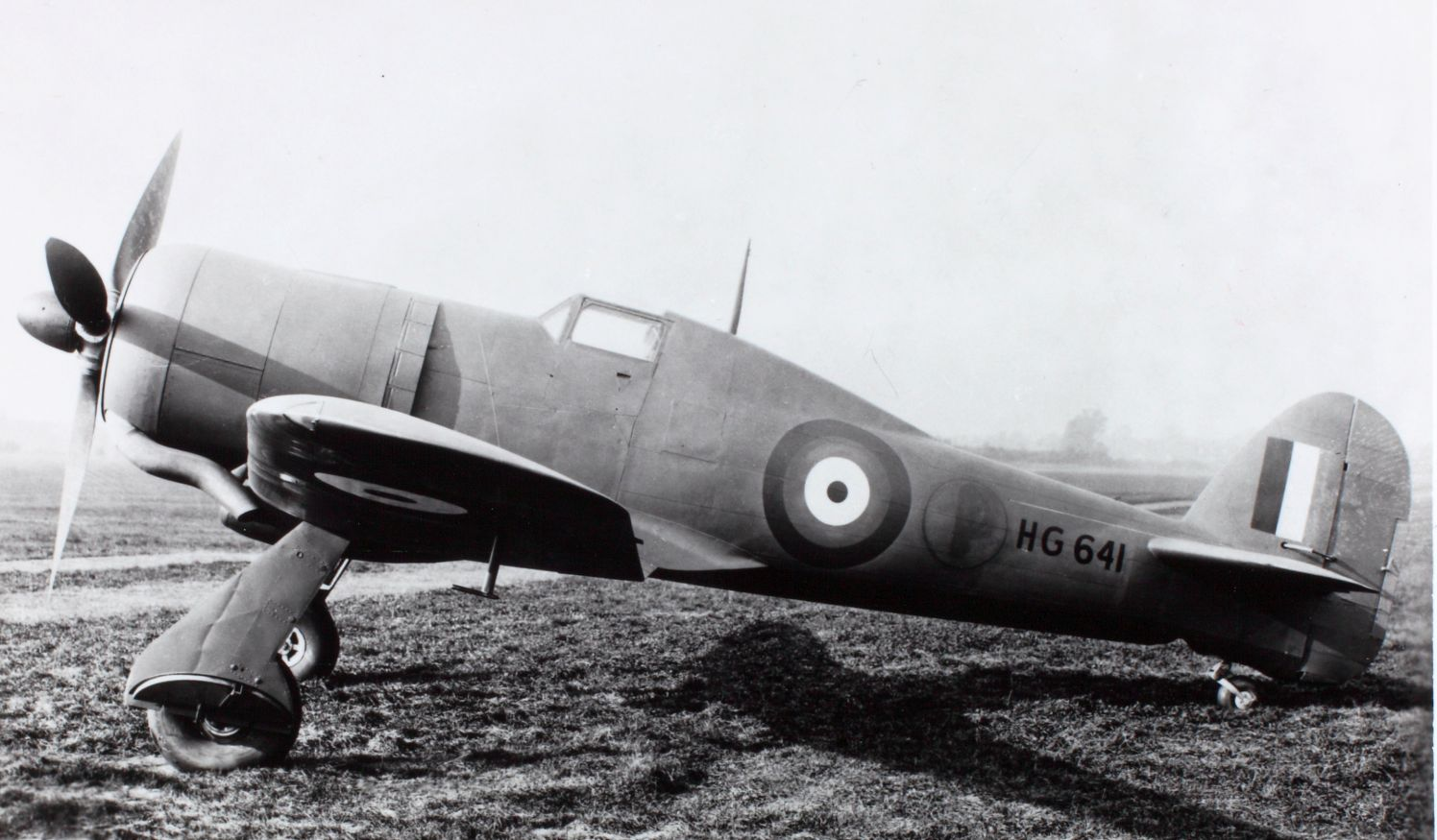
A Hawker Tornado prototype fighter of WWII, with the RAF roundel colors of chrome yellow in the outermost ring, and the red center giving false dark gray colors from orthochromatic film usage.

A panchromatic emulsion renders a realistic reproduction of a scene as it appears to the human eye, although with no colors. Almost all modern photographic film is panchromatic. Some older types of film were orthochromatic and were not sensitive to certain wavelengths of light. As naturally prepared, a silver halide photographic emulsion is much more sensitive to blue and UV light than to green and red wavelengths. The German chemist Hermann W. Vogel found out how to extend the sensitivity into the green, and later the orange, by adding sensitising dyes to the emulsion. By the addition of erythrosine the emulsion could be made orthochromatic while some cyanine derivatives confer sensitivity to the whole visible spectrum making it panchromatic.

However, his technique was not extended to achieve a fully panchromatic film until the early 1900s, shortly after his death. Kenneth Mees credits Wratten & Wainwright with preparing the first commercial plates with panchromatic emulsions. Panchromatic stock for still photographic plates became available commercially in 1906. The switch from orthochromatic film, however, was only gradual. Panchromatic plates cost two to three times as much, and had to be developed in total darkness, unlike orthochromatic—which, being insensitive to red, could be developed under a red light in the darkroom. And the process that increased the film's sensitivity to yellow and red also made it oversensitive to blue and violet, requiring a yellow-red lens filter to correct it, which in turn reduced the total amount of light and increased the necessary exposure time.

Simulated comparison of orthochromatic and panchromatic renderings

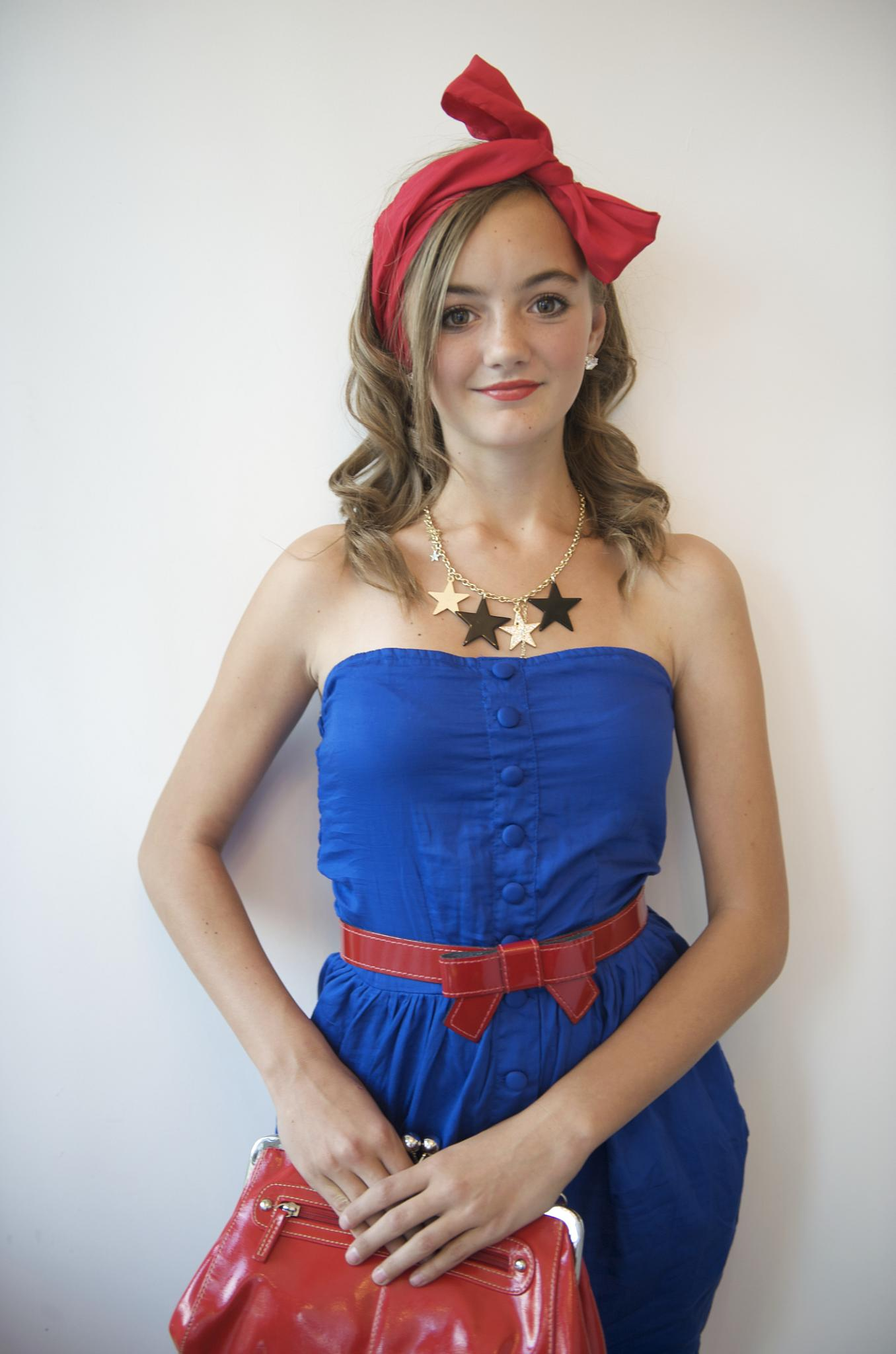
Original (color) photograph

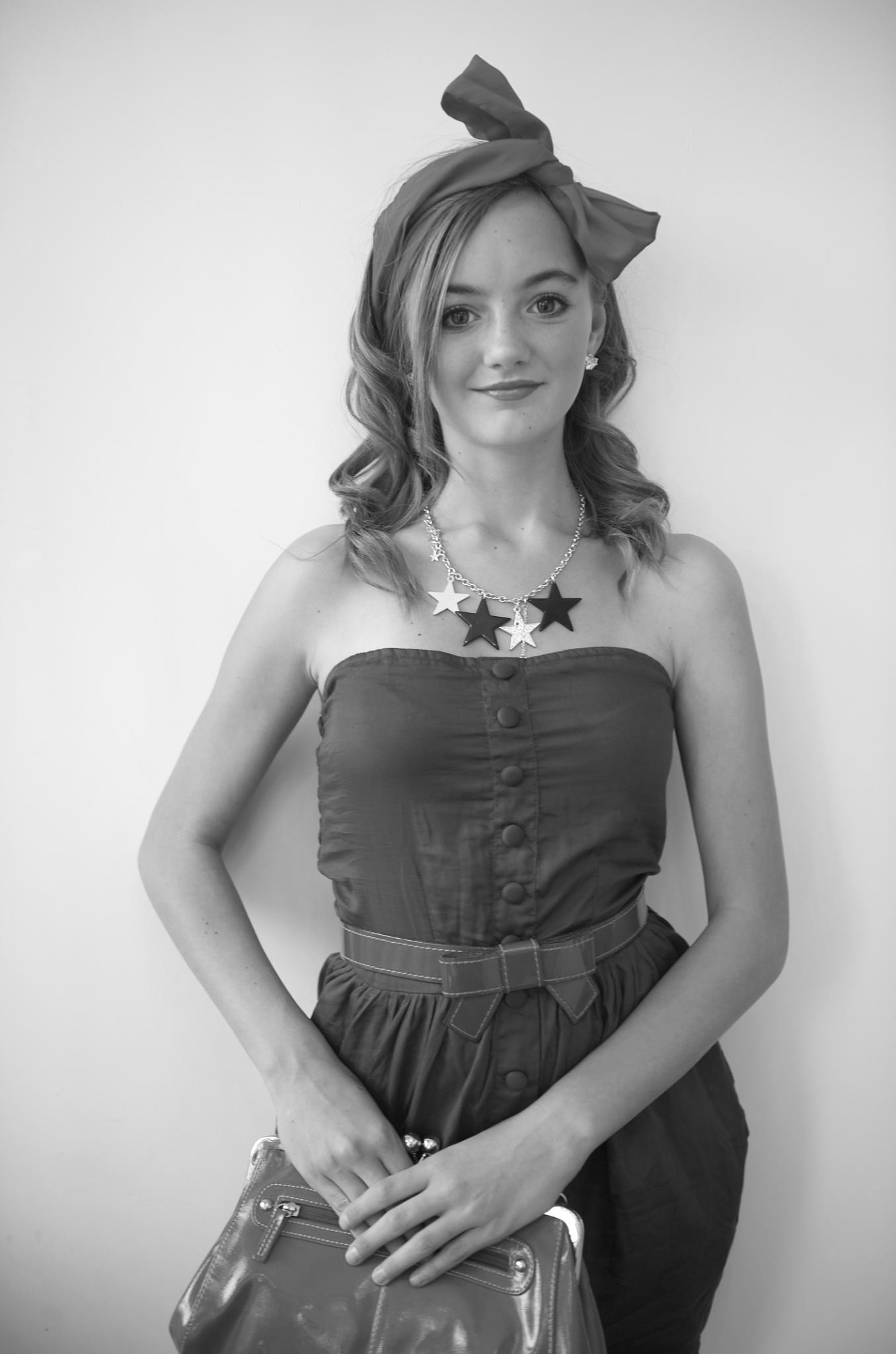
Panchromatic simulation

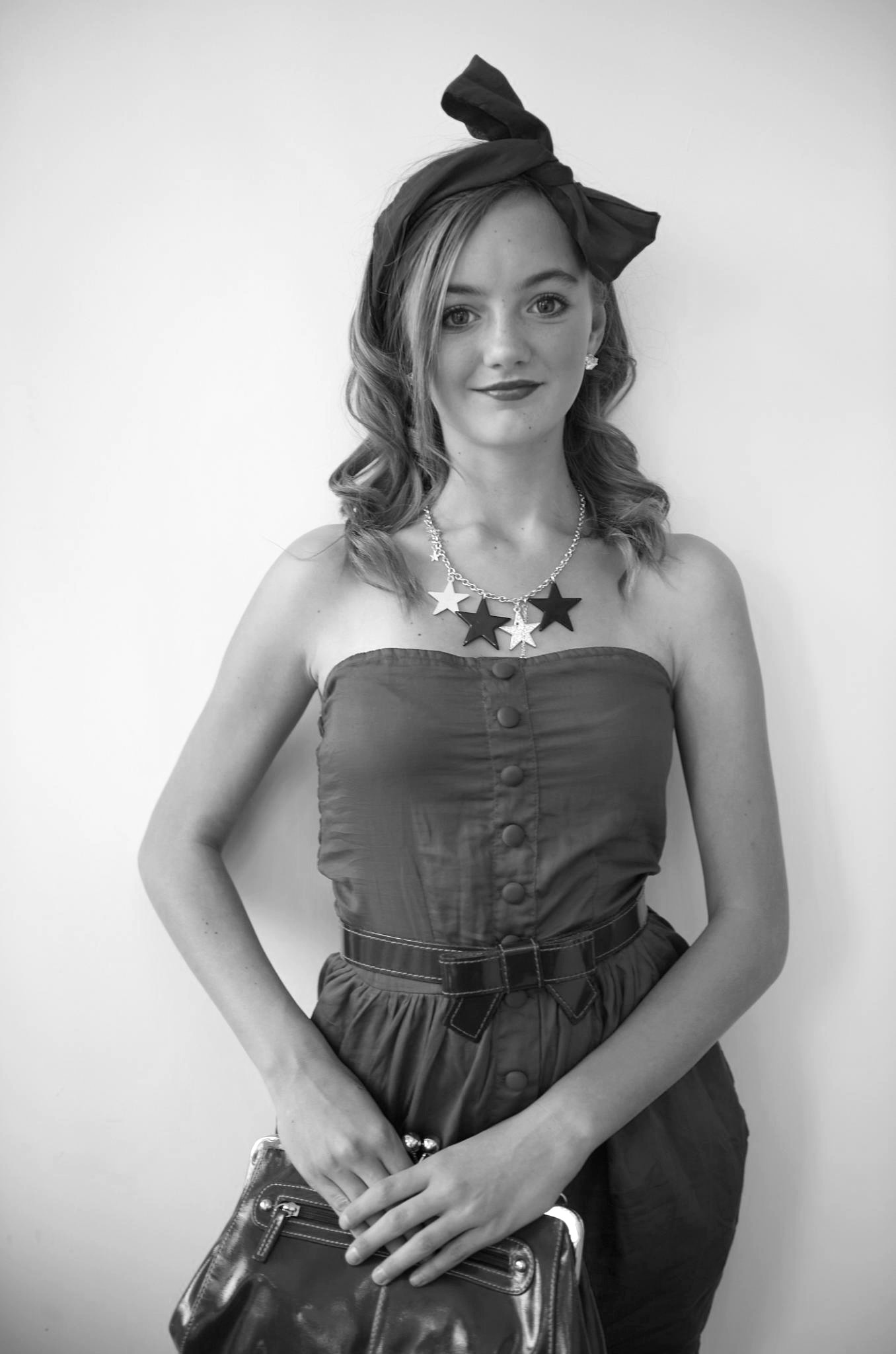
Orthochromatic simulation

The black-and-white simulations retain luminance information only. For the orthochromatic simulation, the red channel was clamped to 12.5% of the original output before converting to luminance.

Orthochromatic film proved troublesome for motion pictures, rendering blue skies as perpetually overcast, blond hair as washed-out, blue eyes nearly white, and red lips nearly black. To some degree this could be corrected by makeup, lens filters, and lighting, but never completely satisfactorily. But even those solutions were unusable for additive color motion picture systems like Kinemacolor and Prizma color, which photographed on black-and-white stock behind alternating color filters. In those cases, negative film stock after it arrived from the manufacturer had to be passed through a color-sensitizing solution, a time-consuming process that increased the film's cost from 3 cents per foot to 7 cents. Eastman Kodak, the supplier of motion picture film, introduced a panchromatic film stock in September 1913, available on special order for photographing color motion pictures in additive systems. Photographers began using it for black-and-white films too in 1918, primarily for outdoor scenes. The company introduced Kodak Panchromatic Cine Film as a regular stock in 1922. The first black-and-white feature film photographed entirely on panchromatic stock was The Headless Horseman (1922). But early panchromatic stock was more expensive, had a relatively short shelf-life, and was more difficult for laboratories to process because it required working in total darkness. Not until the prices were equalized by competition in 1926 did it become used more widely than orthochromatic stock. Kodak discontinued manufacturing general-purpose orthochromatic motion picture film in 1930.

Digital panchromatic imagery of the Earth's surface is also produced by some modern satellites, such as QuickBird, Cartosat and IKONOS. This imagery is extremely useful, as it is generally of a much higher (spatial) resolution than the multispectral imagery from the same satellite. For example, the QuickBird satellite produces panchromatic imagery having a pixel equivalent to an area 0.6×0.6 m (2×2 ft), while the multispectral pixels represent an area of 2.4×2.4 m (8×8 ft).

== See also ==
- Black and white
- Orthochromatic
- Monochromatic color
- Pansharpened image
