= Subtractive color =

Light passing through successive filters

Subtractive color mixing

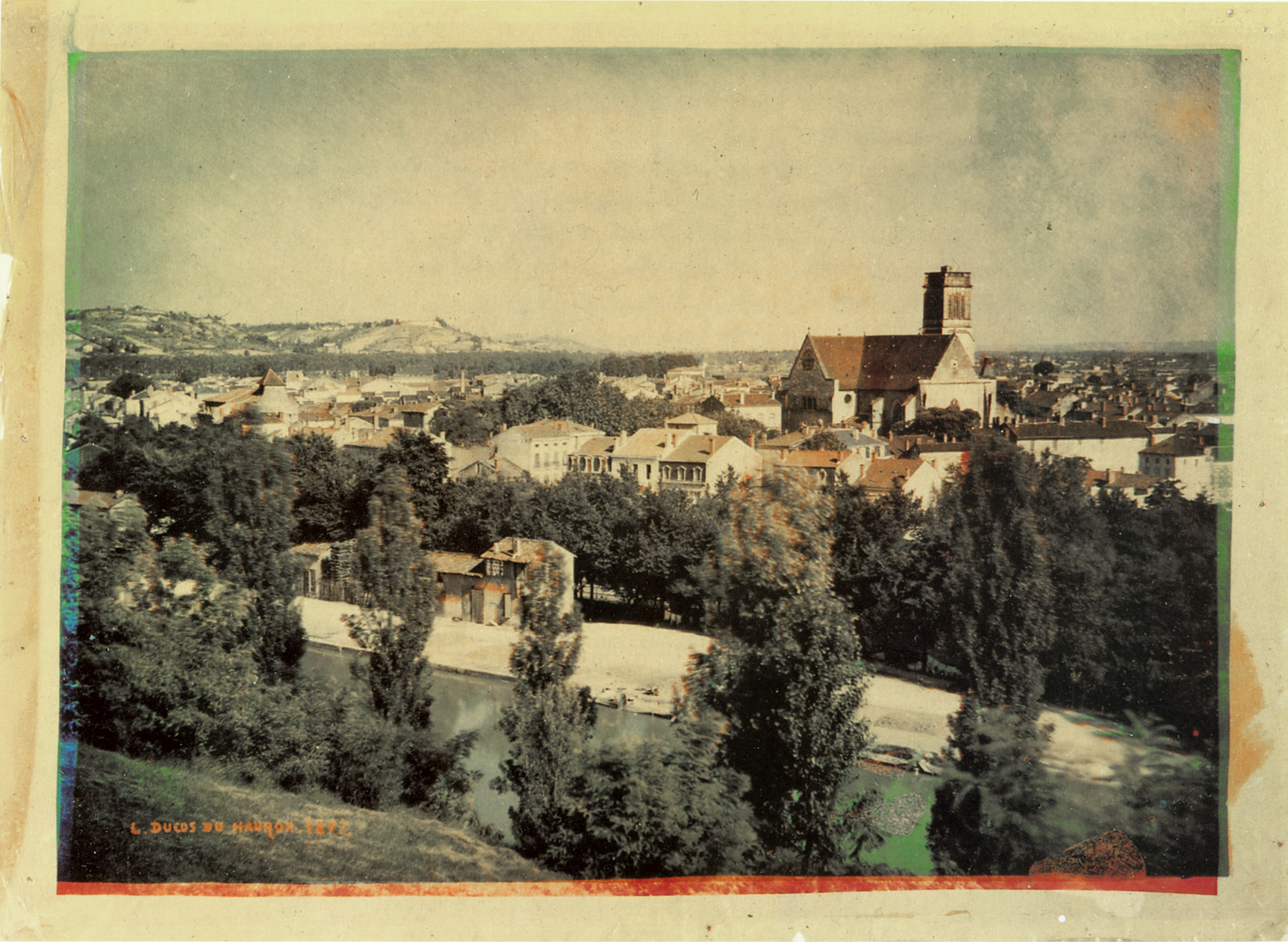
An 1877 color photo by Louis Ducos du Hauron, a French pioneer of color photography. The overlapping subtractive yellow, cyan and red (magenta) image elements can be seen clearly along the edges of the image.

Subtractive color or subtractive color mixing predicts the spectral power distribution of light after it passes through successive layers of partially absorbing media. This idealized model is the essential principle of how dyes and pigments are used in color printing and photography, where the perception of color is elicited after white light passes through microscopic "stacks" of partially absorbing media, allowing some wavelengths of light to reach the eye and not others. It is also a concept seen in painting, wherein the colors are mixed or applied in successive layers, though predicting realistic results (such as blue and yellow mixing to produce green instead of gray) requires more complex models such as Kubelka–Munk theory.

== Process ==
The subtractive color mixing model predicts the resultant spectral power distribution of light filtered through overlaid partially absorbing materials on a reflecting or transparent surface. Each layer partially absorbs some wavelengths of light from the illumination spectrum while letting others pass through, resulting in a colored appearance. The resultant spectral power distribution is predicted by sequentially taking the product of the spectral power distributions of the incoming light and transmissivity at each filter.

== Painting ==
The subtractive model also predicts the color resulting from a mixture of paints, or similar medium such as fabric dye, whether applied in layers or mixed together prior to application. In the case of paint mixed before application, incident light interacts with many different pigment particles at various depths inside the paint layer before emerging. Art supply manufacturers offer colors that successfully fill the roles of the subtractive primary colors magenta and cyan. For example, the phthalocyanine blues, which became available during the 1930s, and quinacridone magenta, first offered during the 1950s, together with yellow produce more highly-saturated violets and greens than do the traditional red and blue.

== RYB ==
An RYB color wheel

RYB (red, yellow, blue) is the traditional set of primary colors used for mixing pigments. It is used in art and art education, particularly in painting. It predated modern scientific color theory.

Red, yellow, and blue are the primary colors of the RYB color "wheel". The secondary colors, violet (or purple), orange, and green [VOG (or POG)] make up another triad, conceptually formed by mixing equal amounts of red and blue, red and yellow, and blue and yellow, respectively.

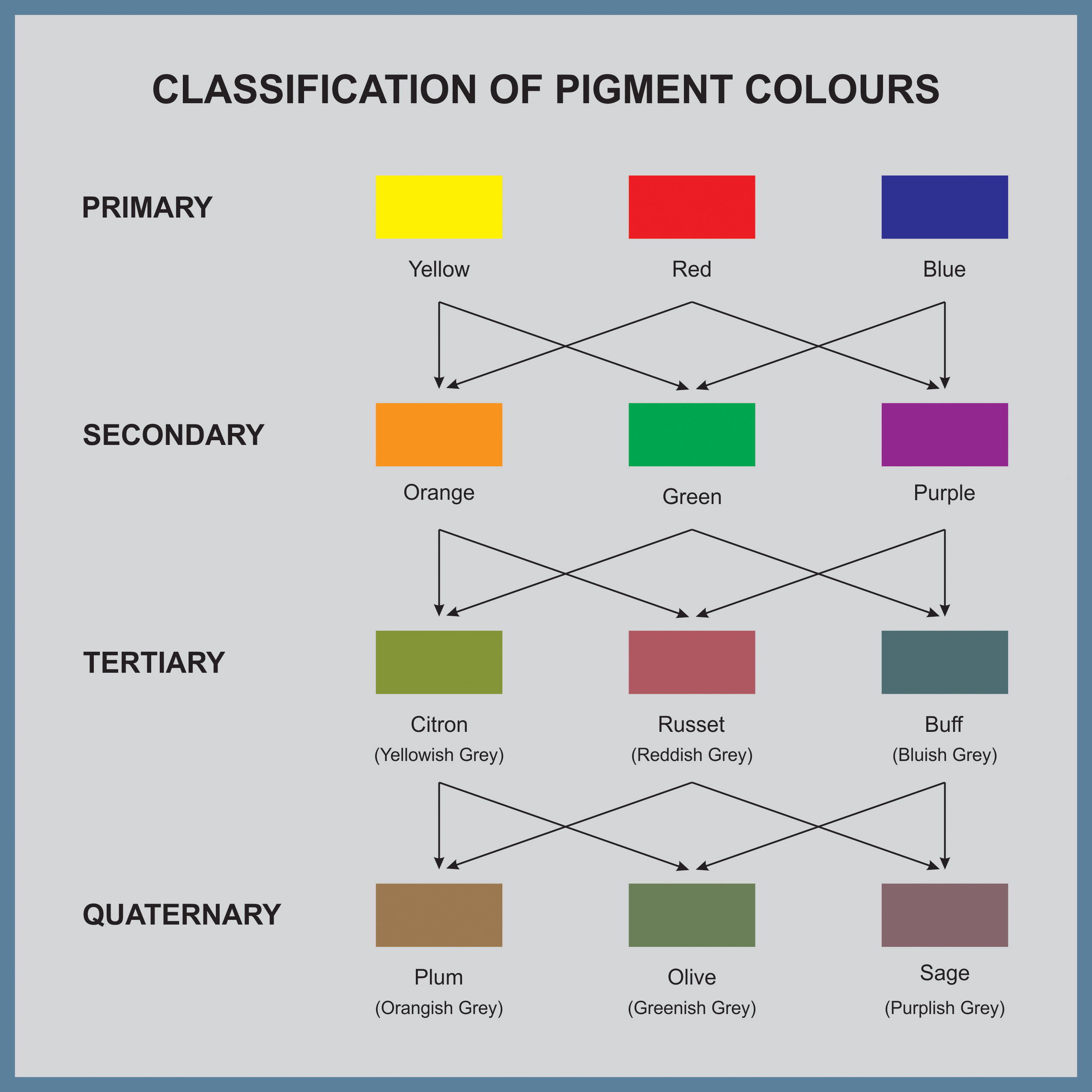
Classification of pigment colors

The RYB primary colors became the foundation of 18th-century theories of color vision as the fundamental sensory qualities blended in the perception of all physical colors and equally in the physical mixture of pigments or dyes. These theories were enhanced by 18th-century investigations of a variety of purely psychological color effects, in particular, the contrast between "complementary" or opposing hues produced by color afterimages and in the contrasting shadows in colored light. These ideas and many personal color observations were summarized in two founding documents in color theory: the Theory of Colours (1810) by the German poet and government minister Johann Wolfgang von Goethe, and The Law of Simultaneous Color Contrast (1839) by the French industrial chemist Michel Eugène Chevreul.

In late 19th and early to mid-20th-century commercial printing, use of the traditional RYB terminology persisted even though the more versatile CMY (cyan, magenta, yellow) triad had been adopted, with the cyan sometimes referred to as "process blue" and the magenta as "process red".

== CMY and CMYK color models and printing processes ==
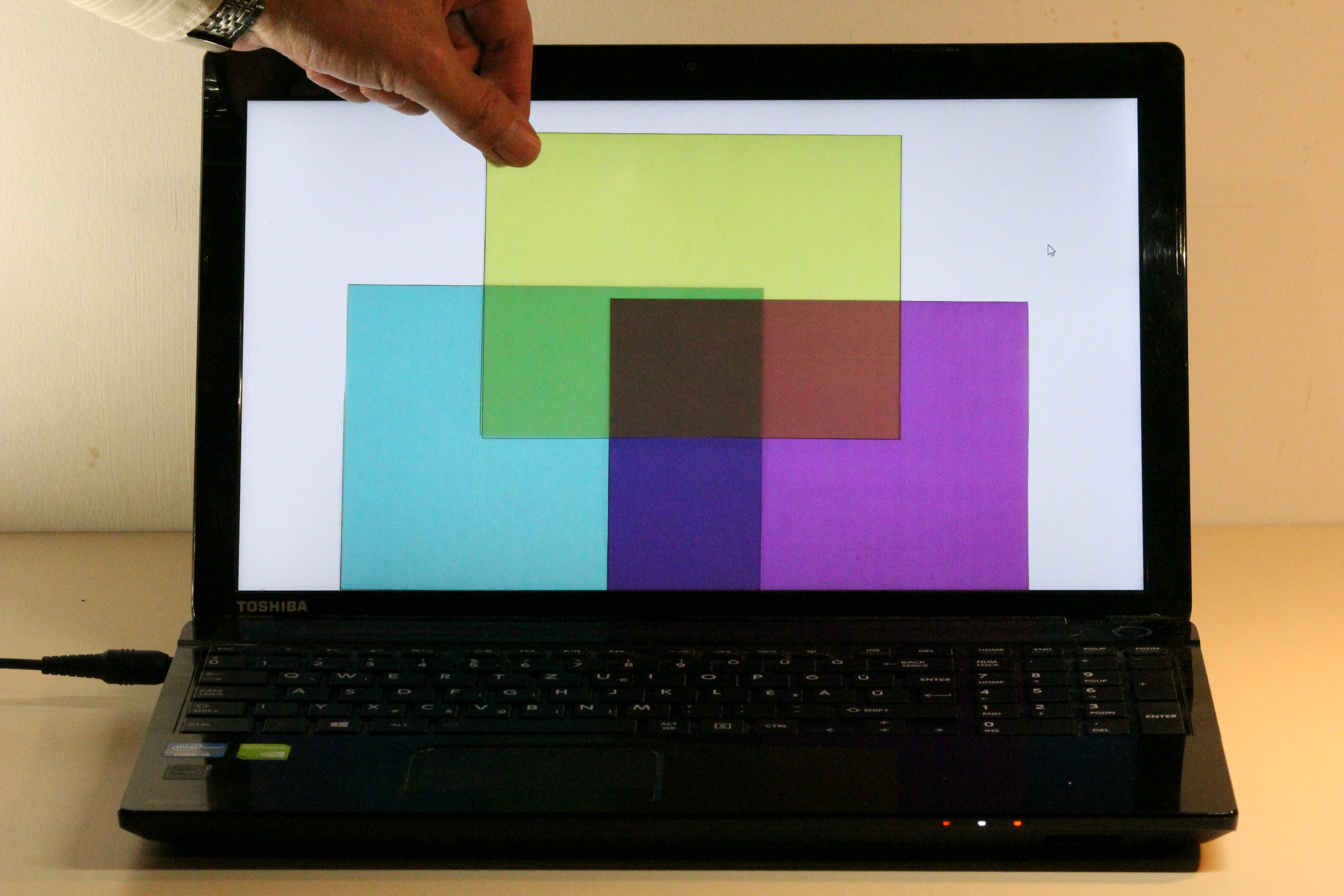
Cyan, magenta and yellow color filters

In color printing, the usual primary colors are cyan, magenta and yellow (CMY). Cyan is the complement of red, meaning that the cyan serves as a filter that absorbs red. The amount of cyan ink applied to a white sheet of paper controls how much of the red light in white light will be reflected back from the paper. Ideally, the cyan ink is completely transparent to green and blue light and has no effect on those parts of the spectrum. Magenta is the complement of green, and yellow the complement of blue. Combinations of different amounts of the three inks can produce a wide range of colors with good saturation.

In inkjet color printing and typical mass production photomechanical printing processes, a black ink K (Key) component is included, resulting in the CMYK color model. The black ink serves to cover unwanted tints in dark areas of the printed image, which result from the imperfect transparency of commercially practical CMY inks; to improve image sharpness, which tends to be degraded by imperfect registration of the three color elements; and to reduce or eliminate consumption of the more expensive color inks where only black or gray is required.

Purely photographic color processes almost never include a K component, because in all common processes the CMY dyes used are much more perfectly transparent, there are no registration errors to camouflage. Therefore, substituting a black dye for a saturated CMY combination, a trivial prospective cost-benefit at best, is technologically impractical in non-electronic analog photography.

== See also ==
- Additive color
- Color mixing
- Color motion picture film
- Color space
- Color theory
- Primary color
