= The Gulf Between =

1917 film directed by Wray Physioc

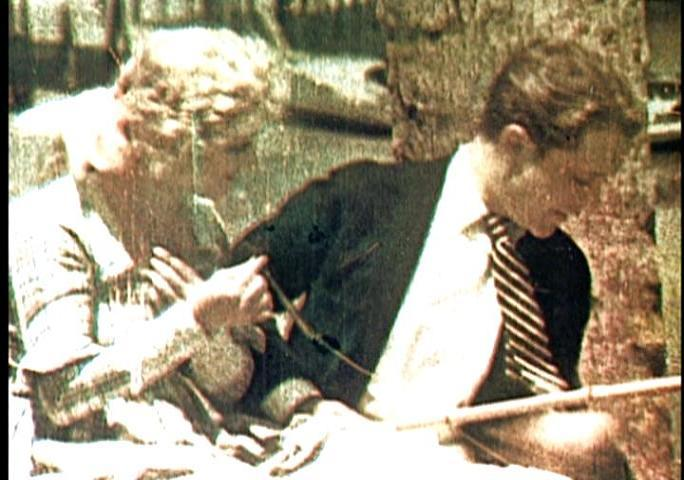
- A surviving frame of the film from a subtractive printing test, approximating the appearance of the original additive two-color projection
- Directed by: Wray Physioc
- Written by: Anthony Paul Kelly; J. Parker Read Jr.
- Starring: Grace Darmond; Niles Welch
- Cinematography: Carl Gregory
- Distributed by: Technicolor Motion Picture Corporation
- Release date: September 13, 1917
- Running time: ≤ 58 minutes at 32 frame/sec. (seven reels) (Note: System 1 was photographed and projected at 32 frames per second, twice the normal speed. Thus, seven reels of a Technicolor film were equal to 3.5 reels of a normal film.)
- Country: United States
- Language: Silent (English intertitles)

The Gulf Between is a 1917 American comedy-drama film that was the first motion picture made in Technicolor, the fourth feature-length color film, (Note: The first three color features were the documentary With Our King and Queen Through India (also known as The Durbar at Delhi, 1912) and the dramas The World, the Flesh and the Devil (1914), and Little Lord Fauntleroy (1914), all filmed in the Kinemacolor process.) and the first feature-length color film produced in the United States. A copy of the film was destroyed in a fire on March 25, 1961, and the film is considered a lost film, with only very short fragments known to survive. These fragments are in the collections of the Margaret Herrick Library, George Eastman House Motion Picture Collection, and the Smithsonian National Museum of American History Photographic History Collection.

The Gulf Between, which had a running time of approximately 58 minutes, was directed by Wray Physioc. The lead roles were played by Grace Darmond and Niles Welch.

== Plot ==
As described in the film magazine Exhibitors Herald, little Marie Farrell (Axzelle), through the carelessness of her nurse, is lost and believed drowned. She has wandered upon the ship of the smuggler Captain Flagg (Brandt), who finds her and brings her up as his own. Her parents adopt a boy to help them forget their grief.

The girl grows up with no memory of her former life. The adopted boy moves in the smart set in Mayport, and his parents try to make a match between him and a society girl. Marie (Darmond) is brought to her adoptive father's sister, as the old captain believes she should have the care of a loving woman. She meets young Richard Farrell (Welch) and the two come to love each other. The Farrells do everything they can to break up the couple, but with the help of the captain a marriage is accomplished. There is a stormy meeting between the bridal pair and the parents, during which the captain sees a portrait of Marie as a baby and, realizing the truth, tells the story of her life. The family is reunited and Marie and Richard spend their honeymoon on the captain's ship.

== Cast ==
- Grace Darmond as Marie
- Niles Welch as Richard Farrell
- Herbert Fortier as Robert Farrell
- Violet Axzelle as a young Marie
- Charles Brandt as Captain Flagg
- Joseph Dailey as Cook
- George De Carlton as Dutch
- Caroline Harris as Mrs. Farrell
- Virginia Lee as Millicent Dunston
- Louis Montjoy
- J. Noa as Pete

== Production ==
The Gulf Between was filmed on location in Jacksonville, Florida in 1917 by the Technicolor Motion Picture Corporation, using its two-color "System 1", in which, by means of a prism beam splitter, two consecutive frames of a single strip of black-and-white film were photographed simultaneously, one behind a red filter and the other behind a green filter.

== Release ==
After private trade showings in Boston on September 13, 1917, and at Aeolian Hall in New York City on September 21, 1917, it was released on February 25, 1918, to play one-week engagements on a tour of a few major Eastern cities, accompanied by the special two-aperture, two-lens, two-filter projector required to exhibit it. Because of the technical problems in keeping the red and green images aligned by prism during projection, it was the only motion picture made in Technicolor's System 1. Technicolor abandoned the additive color process of System 1, and began work on subtractive color processes that did not require a special projector.

== Critical reception ==
Photoplay magazine complained that all colors were reduced into terms of reds and greens, and that "the story is dull, trite, and drawn out interminably."

== See also ==
- List of early color feature films
