= List of early color feature films =

Excerpt from the surviving fragment of With Our King and Queen Through India (1912), the first feature-length film in natural color, filmed in Kinemacolor

This is a list of early feature-length color films (including primarily black-and-white films that have one or more color sequences) made up to about 1936, when the Technicolor three-strip process firmly established itself as the major-studio favorite. About a third of the films are thought to be lost films, with no prints surviving. Some have survived incompletely or only in black-and-white copies made for TV broadcast use in the 1950s.

== Background ==
The earliest attempts to produce color films involved either tinting the film broadly with washes or baths of dyes, or painstakingly hand-painting certain areas of each frame of the film with transparent dyes. Stencil-based techniques such as Pathéchrome were a labor-saving alternative if many copies of a film had to be colored: each dye was rolled over the whole print using an appropriate stencil to restrict the dye to selected areas of each frame. The Handschiegl color process was a comparable technique. Because transparent dyes did not impact the clarity or detail of the image seen on the screen, the result could look rather naturalistic, but the choice of what colors to use, and where, was made by a person, so they could be very arbitrary and unlike the actual colors.

Edward Raymond Turner's process, tested in 1902, was the first to capture full natural color on motion picture film, but it proved to be mechanically impractical. A simplified two-color version, introduced as Kinemacolor in 1909, was successful until 1915, but the special projector it required and its inherent major technical defects contributed to its demise. Technicolor, originally also a two-color process capable of only a limited range of hues, was commercialized in 1922 and soon became the most widely used of the several two-color processes available in the 1920s.

Beginning in 1932, Technicolor introduced a new full-color process, "Process 4", now commonly called "three-strip Technicolor" because the special camera used for live-action filming yielded separate black-and-white negatives for each of the three primary colors. The final print, however, was a single full-color strip of film that did not need any special handling. This became the standard process used by the major Hollywood studios until the mid-1950s.

== List of films ==
Year	Title	Country	Color process	Length	Production company
1903	La vie et la passion de Jésus Christ	France	Pathéchrome		Pathé Frères
Extant. Also known as The Passion Play and Vie et Passion du Christ. Not released as a single feature, but as 32 individual shorts in three different groupings and shot at different times. Some scenes are partially hand colored (e.g. 88 min. copy on YouTube (with Dutch intertitles)). The later scenes feature different actors and costumes to the earlier scenes. On DVD.
1912	With Our King and Queen Through India	United Kingdom	Kinemacolor	16,000 ft.	Natural Color Kinematograph Company
First feature-length documentary capturing natural color rather than colorization techniques. The original footage ran for 2½ hours (16,000 ft.), presented in two different programs. The main film of the Delhi Durbar itself was shot on 12 December 1911. The rest of the film was made in other locations in India up to 30 December 1911, of which only a ten-minute extract still exists. Released in UK on 2 February 1912.
1912	Making of the Panama Canal	United States	Kinemacolor	2 hours	Kinemacolor Company of America
Most successful Kinemacolor documentary after With Our King and Queen Through India. The film was nine reels long and ran for 2 hours. It was also shown by Charles Urban in Britain. Only black-and-white stills remain.
1912	The Miracle	United Kingdom	Éclair process	7,000 feet	Joseph Menchen (personal project)
First full-color (hand-colored) dramatic feature film. Filmed in Austria in October 1912; hand-colored in Paris by seventy people; UK release on 21 December 1912 at the Royal Opera House, Covent Garden. Original UK length 7,000 feet; censored versions showed at 5,000 and 5,500 feet. Designed to be accompanied by score for full symphony orchestra and chorus by Engelbert Humperdinck. A B&W print of a cut version is extant, held at the CNC Archives, France. Available on YouTube and final scene only, with extracts of the score recorded in 1932.
1914	The World, the Flesh and the Devil	United Kingdom	Kinemacolor		Natural Color Kinematograph Company
First feature-length narrative film in natural color. Lost.
1914	Little Lord Fauntleroy	United Kingdom	Kinemacolor		Natural Color Kinematograph Company
Lost film. Only black-and-white stills remain.
1914–15	With the Fighting Forces of Europe	United Kingdom	Kinemacolor	c. 20,000 ft	Color Films Ltd.
Documentary film about the First World War, produced by Color Films Ltd., successor to the Natural Color Kinematograph Company. Some scenes were reused from the pre-war period, but many were shot during the war, particularly on the Western Front. The film was released shortly after the outbreak of war in 1914 and was constantly updated with new material until 1915. For this reason, the length of the film varied, with contemporary accounts reporting around 20,000 feet. The film has been lost.
1915	Britain Prepared	United Kingdom	Kinemacolor inserts		Jury's Imperial Pictures
First British propaganda film. Extant.
1916	Joan the Woman	United States	Handschiegl color process inserts		Famous Players–Lasky
Survives complete with color sequences. Directed by Cecil B. DeMille. (Color was billed as the "DeMille-Wyckoff Process")
1917	The Gulf Between	United States	Technicolor feature		Technicolor Corporation
First American film shot in color. Lost film. Only a few frames from test prints, showing star Grace Darmond, have survived.
1917	The Devil-Stone	United States	Handschiegl color process inserts		Famous Players–Lasky
Directed by Cecil B. DeMille. Only two reels survive in AFI collection at Library of Congress.
1918	Cupid Angling	United States	Douglass Natural Color feature		Douglass Natural Color Film Inc.
Lost film. Only feature film made in this process.
1918	Our Navy	United States	Prizma feature		Prizma
First feature film shot in Prizmacolor.
1920	Treasure Island	United States	Hand coloring (Handschiegl?)		Paramount Pictures
Lost film.
1920	Roman Candles	United States	Handschiegl color process inserts		Cineart
Prints exist.
1920	Way Down East	United States	Technicolor insert		D. W. Griffith Productions
Extant in black-and-white only.
1921	Bali the Unknown	United States	Prizma feature		Prizma Inc.
Five-reel documentary opened 27 February 1921 at Capitol Theatre in NYC. Considered lost.
1921	The Three Musketeers	United States	Handschiegl color process inserts		United Artists
Restored in 2022.
1922	The Toll of the Sea	United States	Technicolor feature	3190 ft.	Technicolor / Metro Pictures
The first natural-color feature film made in Hollywood. The final two reels are apparently lost. On DVD.
1922	A Blind Bargain	United States	Handschiegl color process inserts	188 ft.	Goldwyn Pictures
Lost film.
1922	The Glorious Adventure	United States/ United Kingdom	Prizma feature		United Artists
Directed by J. Stuart Blackton. Extant at BFI National Archive. On DVD.
1922	Flames of Passion	United Kingdom	Prizma insert		Astra Film
Directed by Graham Cutts. Lost film.
1922	Foolish Wives	United States	Hand coloring inserts		Universal Pictures
Hand coloring by Gustav Brock.
1923	Red Lights	United States	Handschiegl color inserts		Goldwyn Pictures
Extant in black-and-white only.
1923	The Ten Commandments	United States	Technicolor inserts, Handschiegl color inserts		Paramount Pictures
Survives complete. On DVD.
1923	Vanity Fair	United States	Prizma insert		Goldwyn Pictures
Directed by Hugo Ballin. Lost film.
1923	The Virgin Queen	United Kingdom	Prizma insert		J. Stuart Blackton Productions
Directed by J. Stuart Blackton. Status unknown.
1923	I Pagliacci	United Kingdom	Prizma insert		Napoleon Films
Starring Lillian Hall-Davis. Status unknown.
1923	Maytime	United States	Technicolor insert	200 ft.	B. P. Schulberg Productions
Partially restored.
1924	The Uninvited Guest	United States	Technicolor insert		Metro Pictures
Preservation status unknown.
1924	Cytherea	United States	Technicolor inserts	230 ft.	Technicolor / Goldwyn Pictures
Lost film. First Technicolor film shot under artificial light.
1924	Wanderer of the Wasteland	United States	Technicolor feature	3854 ft.	Paramount
First Western in color. Lost film.
1924	Venus of the South Seas	United States	Prizma insert		Lee-Bradford Corp.
Extant. Restored by the Library of Congress in 2004. Final reel is in Prizma.
1924	The Heritage of the Desert	United States	Technicolor inserts	34 ft.	Paramount
Starring Bebe Daniels. Unknown status.
1924	Greed	United States	Handschiegl color process inserts		Metro-Goldwyn-Mayer
Short version of film extant, coloring lost (a few specimen frames may survive). On DVD.
1924	The Dance of the Moods	United Kingdom	Friese-Greene Natural Color (formerly Biocolour)		Friese-Greene Productions
It is currently unknown if this is a feature or short film.
1924	Moonbeam Magic	United Kingdom	Friese-Greene Natural Color (formerly Biocolour)		Spectrum Films
Produced by Claude Friese-Greene. Status unknown, possibly at BFI National Archive.
1925	Ben-Hur	United States	Technicolor inserts	1029 ft.	Metro-Goldwyn-Mayer
Extant. On DVD.
1925	Cyrano de Bergerac	Italy/ France	Pathéchrome feature	9501 ft.	Unione Cinematografica Italiana
Starring Pierre Magnier. Extant.
1925	The Phantom of the Opera	United States	Technicolor inserts, Kelley Color /Handschiegl color	497 ft.	Universal Pictures
One color segment survives. On DVD.
1925	The Merry Widow	United States	Technicolor insert	136 ft.	Metro-Goldwyn-Mayer
Film survives, including two-minute color sequence.
1925	Stage Struck	United States	Technicolor inserts		Paramount
Extant with color sequences. Restored by George Eastman House. Starring Gloria Swanson.
1925	Pretty Ladies	United States	Technicolor insert	597 ft.	Metro-Goldwyn-Mayer
Extant only in black-and-white.
1925	His Supreme Moment	United States	Technicolor inserts	517 ft.	First National Pictures
Lost film.
1925	The Big Parade	United States	Applied color by Technicolor	154 ft.	Metro-Goldwyn-Mayer
Feature and color exists. On DVD.
1925	So This Is Marriage	United States	Technicolor insert	729 ft.	Metro-Goldwyn-Mayer
Lost film.
1925	The Splendid Road	United States	Handschiegl color inserts		First National Pictures
Status unknown.
1925	Seven Chances	United States	Technicolor insert	275 ft.	Metro-Goldwyn-Mayer
Extant with color. On DVD.
1925	The King on Main Street	United States	Technicolor inserts	105 ft.	Famous Players–Lasky
Survives complete.
1925	Lights of Old Broadway	United States	Technicolor inserts, Handschiegl color process inserts		Cosmopolitan Productions
Extant in Library of Congress.
1925	Peacock Feathers	United States	Technicolor insert	82 ft.	Universal Pictures
Lost film.
1926	Fig Leaves	United States	Technicolor insert	969 ft.	Fox Film
Extant only in black-and-white.
1926	Beverly of Graustark	United States	Technicolor insert	354 ft.	Metro-Goldwyn-Mayer
Extant.
1926	Monte Carlo	United States	Technicolor inserts	1000 ft.	Metro-Goldwyn-Mayer
Extant.
1926	Into Her Kingdom	United States	Technicolor insert	221 ft.	First National Pictures
Lost film.
1926	The Yankee Señor	United States	Technicolor insert	475 ft.	Fox
Extant.
1926	The Far Cry	United States	Technicolor insert	807 ft.	First National Pictures
Extant.
1926	Hell's Four Hundred	United States	Technicolor insert	321 ft.	Fox
Extant.
1926	The Open Road	United Kingdom	Friese-Greene Natural Color (formerly Biocolour)		Friese-Greene Productions
Series of documentary films shot between 1924 and 1926. A print was restored and shown on the BBC in 2006. On DVD.
1926	Gli ultimi giorni di Pompeii	Italy	Pathéchrome feature	12083 ft.	Società Italiana Grandi Films
Extant. US Title: The Last Days of Pompeii On DVD.
1926	Irene	United States	Technicolor inserts	972 ft.	First National Pictures
Survives complete with color sequences.
1926	Beau Geste	United States	Technicolor inserts		Paramount Pictures
Extant.
1926	The Flaming Forest	United States	Technicolor inserts	203 ft.	Metro-Goldwyn-Mayer
Extant at Library of Congress.
1926	The American Venus	United States	Technicolor insert	1574 ft.	Paramount
Lost film. Two trailers, and brief clip of color insert, survive at the Library of Congress.
1926	Volcano	United States	Handschiegl color inserts		Paramount Pictures
Extant at Library of Congress. Preserved by UCLA Film and Television Archive and The Museum of Modern Art.
1926	Mike	United States	Handschiegl color inserts		Metro-Goldwyn-Mayer
Extant at Library of Congress. Complete print of 70 minutes found at Library of Congress in December 2015.
1926	The Black Pirate	United States	Technicolor feature	8124 ft.	United Artists
Original Technicolor Process 2 print survives at the BFI National Archive. Commonly seen version was created from surviving negatives. Outtakes survive in black-and-white. On DVD.
1926	The Fire Brigade	United States	Technicolor inserts, Handschiegl color inserts	692 ft.	Metro-Goldwyn-Mayer
Film extant, but color is incomplete. At Library of Congress.
1926	The Joy Girl	United States	Technicolor insert	285 ft.	Fox
A copy may survive in the Museum of Modern Art film archive.
1926	Flames	United States	Handschiegl color inserts		Associated Exhibitors
One reel exists in the Library of Congress.
1926	The Girl from Montmartre	United States	Handschiegl color inserts		First National Pictures
Preserved by Warner Bros. from original negative and nitrate handschiegl print.
1927	Long Pants	United States	Technicolor insert	950 ft.	First National Pictures
Extant.
1927	White Pants Willie	United States	Technicolor insert	533 ft.	First National Pictures
Extant.
1927	The Girl From Rio	United States	Technicolor insert	125 ft.	Gotham Productions
Extant.
1927	Frisco Sally Levy	United States	Technicolor insert	381 ft.	Metro-Goldwyn-Mayer
Extant.
1927	The King of Kings	United States	Technicolor inserts		DeMille Productions / Pathé Exchange
Survives complete. On DVD.
1927	Winners of the Wilderness	United States	Technicolor insert	180 ft.	Metro-Goldwyn-Mayer
16mm print extant. Starring Joan Crawford. On DVD.
1927	Annie Laurie	United States	Technicolor insert	204 ft.	Metro-Goldwyn-Mayer
Extant with color at the Library of Congress.
1927	The Wizard	United States	Hand coloring		Fox
Lost film.
1927	Napoléon	France	Keller-Dorian process sequences		Abel Gance / Gaumont
Extant. Keller-Dorian process proved to be impractical.
1927	La revue des revues	France	Pathéchrome inserts		
Extant.
1927	Casanova	France/ Germany	Pathéchrome insert		Ciné-Alliance / Deulig Film / Pathé
Extant. Based on operetta by Ralph Benatzky.
1928	The Garden of Eden	United States	Technicolor insert	277 ft.	First National Pictures
Extant.
1928	The Actress	United States	Technicolor insert	121 ft.	Metro-Goldwyn-Mayer
Extant.
1928	Revenge	United States	Technicolor insert	329 ft.	United Artists
Lost film.
1928	The Big Hop	United States	Technicolor insert	500 ft.	Buck Jones Productions
Lost film.
1928	The Woman and the Puppet	France	Keller-Dorian process		Société des Cinéromans / Pathé
Extant. Directed by Jacques de Baroncelli.
1928	None but the Brave	United States	Technicolor insert	549 ft.	Fox
Status unknown.
1928	The Wedding March	United States	Technicolor insert, hand coloring	294 ft.	Paramount
Extant. Directed by Erich von Stroheim.
1928	Red Hair	United States	Technicolor insert	57 ft.	Paramount
Lost film. Color tests survive at UCLA Film and Television Archive.
1928	The Viking	United States	Technicolor feature	8398 ft.	Metro-Goldwyn-Mayer
Extant. The first Technicolor feature with sound (synchronized music score and sound effects only, no dialog or "live" sound). On DVD.
1928	The Water Hole	United States	Technicolor inserts	332 ft.	Paramount
Status unknown.
1928	Court-Martial	United States	Technicolor insert	473 ft.	Columbia Pictures
Status unknown.
1929	Redskin	United States	Mostly Technicolor with sepia-toned sequences	4463 ft.	Paramount
Synchronized music score and sound effects but no dialog or "live" sound. Survives complete. On DVD.
1929	The Desert Song	United States	Technicolor insert	306 ft.	Warner Bros.
Extant in black-and-white only. The first all-talking feature with color sequences.
1929	On with the Show!	United States	Technicolor feature	9592 ft.	Warner Bros.
Extant in black-and-white. 20-second color clip exists in private collection. The first all-color all-talking feature. On DVD from Warner Archive Collection.
1929	Harmony Heaven	United Kingdom	Pathéchrome sequences		British International Pictures
Extant at BFI National Archive.
1929	A Romance of Seville	United Kingdom	Pathéchrome feature		British International Pictures
Sound version released July 1930. First British sound film released in color, using the Pathéchrome stencil-coloring process. On DVD.
1929	Devil-May-Care	United States	Technicolor insert		Metro-Goldwyn-Mayer
Prints survive.
1929	The Show of Shows	United States	Technicolor feature	9987 ft.	Warner Bros.
Only survives in black-and-white except "Chinese Fantasy" number with Myrna Loy and Nick Lucas and part or all of "Meet My Sister" number. On DVD with latter number in black-and-white (color footage only recently discovered).
1929	Pointed Heels	United States	Technicolor inserts	270 ft.	Paramount
Extant complete at UCLA Film and Television Archive. Broadcast master is in black-and-white.
1929	Paris	United States	Technicolor inserts	3645 ft.	Warner Bros.
Picture lost except 3 fragments at Seaver Center. International silent soundtrack extant as well as talking reel 7.
1929	Gold Diggers of Broadway	United States	Technicolor feature	9122 ft.	Warner Bros.
Two incomplete reels and some short fragments extant. Complete soundtrack extant.
1929	Sally	United States	Technicolor feature	9280 ft.	First National-Warner Bros.
Extant only in black-and-white. Two-minute color sequence also extant. On DVD.
1929	Glorifying the American Girl	United States	Technicolor insert	897 ft.	Paramount
Extant complete at UCLA Film and Television Archive. On DVD.
1929	The Broadway Melody	United States	Technicolor insert	307 ft.	Metro-Goldwyn-Mayer
Extant in black-and-white only. On DVD.
1929	Sunny Side Up	United States	Multicolor inserts		Fox
Extant in black-and-white only.
1929	The Hollywood Revue of 1929	United States	Technicolor inserts	1360 ft.	Metro-Goldwyn-Mayer
Extant.
1929	Broadway	United States	Technicolor insert	198 ft.	Universal
Survives in a talking version and a silent version made for theaters without sound equipment. The talking version is missing the final reel, the color sequence, which does survive in the silent version.
1929	Married in Hollywood	United States	Multicolor insert		Fox
Only final reel in Multicolor survives at UCLA Film and Television Archive.
1929	Red Hot Rhythm	United States	Multicolor insert		Pathé Exchange
Only one number in color, the title song, survives.
1929	This Thing Called Love	United States	Multicolor insert		Pathé Exchange
Lost film except for color sequence.
1929	The Dance of Life	United States	Technicolor insert	779 ft.	Paramount
Extant in black-and-white.
1929	Footlights and Fools	United States	Technicolor inserts	1183 ft.	First National-Warner Bros.
Lost film.
1929	His First Command	United States	Multicolor inserts		Pathé Exchange
Extant in black-and-white. Status of Multicolor sequences unknown.
1929	It's a Great Life	United States	Technicolor inserts	1391 ft.	Metro-Goldwyn-Mayer
Extant. On DVD from Warner Archive Collection.
1929	The Mysterious Island	United States	Technicolor feature	8569 ft.	Metro-Goldwyn-Mayer
Extant at UCLA Film and Television Archive. Complete Technicolor print was discovered in Prague, December 2013 and premiered at the 33rd Pordenone Silent Film Festival in October 2014. On DVD.
1929	Rio Rita	United States	Technicolor insert	2680 ft.	RKO Radio Pictures
Survives in a cut re-release copy with all color sequences. On DVD.
1929	William Fox Movietone Follies of 1929	United States	Multicolor inserts		Fox
Lost film.
1929	The Great Gabbo	United States	Multicolor inserts		Sono Art-World Wide Pictures
Survives in black-and-white except for missing color musical number "The Ga-Ga Bird". On DVD.
1929	Smiling Irish Eyes	United States	Technicolor inserts		First National Pictures
Lost film. Soundtrack discs survive at UCLA Film and Television Archive.
1930	The Rogue Song	United States	Technicolor feature	9565 ft.	Metro-Goldwyn-Mayer
Lost film. Complete soundtrack extant on discs. Trailer and fragments preserved at UCLA Film and Television Archive.
1930	The Vagabond King	United States	Technicolor feature	9413 ft.	Paramount
Only complete copy restored by UCLA Film and Television Archive.
1930	Just for a Song	United Kingdom	Pathécolor sequences		Gainsborough Pictures
Lost film.
1930	Song of the West	United States	Technicolor feature	7189 ft.	Warner Bros.
Picture lost except for a minute-long color clip. First all-talking Western shot in color. First all-color all-talking feature shot entirely outdoors. On DVD from Warner Archive Collection.
1930	Hold Everything	United States	Technicolor feature	7280 ft.	Warner Bros.
Lost film. Complete soundtrack extant on discs.
1930	Alf's Button	United Kingdom	Pathécolor sequences		British Gaumont
Lost film.
1930	Paramount on Parade	United States	Technicolor inserts	2517 ft.	Paramount
Plotless all-star revue. Most survives, but one black-and-white and one color sequence are missing, the color finale with Maurice Chevalier survives only in black-and-white, and the sound for two of the color sequences is missing. Restored by UCLA Film and Television Archive.
1930	Under a Texas Moon	United States	Technicolor feature	7501 ft.	Warner Bros.
Extant.
1930	Whoopee!	United States	Technicolor feature	8681 ft.	United Artists
Survives in at least one complete color copy.
1930	The School for Scandal	United Kingdom	Raycolor feature		Albion Films
Only feature film photographed in this process. Lost film.
1930	Elstree Calling	United Kingdom	Pathéchrome Inserts		British International Pictures
Extant at BFI National Archive. Co-directed by Alfred Hitchcock.
1930	Hell's Angels	United States	Multicolor insert	866 ft.	United Artists
Color sequence and film survive complete. Scene filmed in Multicolor, printed by Technicolor.
1930	Knowing Men	United Kingdom	Talkicolor feature		United Artists Corporation
Second British sound feature in color. Extant in black-and-white at BFI National Archive.
1930	King of Jazz	United States	Technicolor feature	9320 ft.	Universal
Extant.
1930	Chasing Rainbows	United States	Technicolor insert	1249 ft.	Metro-Goldwyn-Mayer
Black-and-white parts survive, color sequences are completely lost.
1930	They Learned About Women	United States	Technicolor insert		Metro-Goldwyn-Mayer
Extant in black-and-white only.
1930	Good News	United States	Multicolor insert		Metro-Goldwyn-Mayer
Color was used for the finale, which is now completely lost. The rest survives.
1930	Showgirl in Hollywood	United States	Technicolor insert	832 ft.	First National-Warner Bros.
Extant only in black-and-white.
1930	Bride of the Regiment	United States	Technicolor feature	7418 ft.	First National-Warner Bros.
Picture lost except for a 20-second color clip. Complete soundtrack extant.
1930	Madam Satan	United States	Multicolor inserts		Metro-Goldwyn-Mayer
Color was used for the airship party sequences, but the rest of the sequences only survive in black-and-white.
1930	Puttin' On the Ritz	United States	Technicolor insert	953 ft.	United Artists
Extant only in black-and-white.
1930	Mammy	United States	Technicolor inserts	1497 ft.	Warner Bros.
Extant. The first Al Jolson film with color.
1930	Call of the Flesh	United States	Technicolor insert	721 ft.	Metro-Goldwyn-Mayer
Extant only in black-and-white.
1930	Bright Lights	United States	Technicolor feature	6416 ft.	Warner Bros.
Extant only in black-and-white.
1930	Children of Pleasure	United States	Technicolor insert	~700 ft.	Metro-Goldwyn-Mayer
Survives complete in black-and-white. Color sequences extant in sections.
1930	General Crack	United States	Technicolor insert	532 ft.	Warner Bros.
Survives in a silent copy with no color sequences made for theaters without sound equipment.
1930	The Melody Man	United States	Technicolor insert	826 ft.	Columbia Pictures
Extant.
1930	Follow Thru	United States	Technicolor feature	8383 ft.	Paramount
Extant.
1930	The March of Time	United States	Technicolor inserts		Metro-Goldwyn-Mayer
Production never completed. Several musical sequences extant.
1930	New Movietone Follies of 1930	United States	Multicolor inserts		Fox
Extant. Only copy at UCLA Film and Television Archive.
1930	The Florodora Girl	United States	Technicolor insert	608 ft.	Metro-Goldwyn-Mayer
Extant.
1930	Mamba	United States	Technicolor feature	6998 ft.	Tiffany Pictures
Extant complete. First all-color all-talking feature which was not a musical. On DVD.
1930	Sweet Kitty Bellairs	United States	Technicolor feature	5846 ft.	Warner Bros.
Extant only in black-and-white. On DVD.
1930	Son of the Gods	United States	Technicolor insert	442 ft.	Warner Bros.
Extant only in black-and-white.
1930	Song of the Flame	United States	Technicolor feature	6501 ft.	Warner Bros.
Picture lost except 2 fragments at Seaver Center. Complete soundtrack extant.
1930	The Life of the Party	United States	Technicolor feature	7202 ft.	Warner Bros.
Extant only in black-and-white.
1930	Viennese Nights	United States	Technicolor feature	9191 ft.	Warner Bros.
Extant, preserved at UCLA Film and Television Archive.
1930	Golden Dawn	United States	Technicolor feature	7546 ft.	Warner Bros.
Extant in black-and-white only. Color fragment found circa 2015.
1930	Peacock Alley	United States	Technicolor insert	651 ft.	Tiffany
Extant; color sequence is at the Library of Congress.
1930	No, No, Nanette	United States	Technicolor inserts	3895 ft.	First National-Warner Bros.
BFI National Archive holds a 35 mm incomplete nitrate print 160 ft.
1930	The Lottery Bride	United States	Technicolor insert	358 ft.	United Artists
Color sequence survives at the George Eastman House. On DVD.
1930	Lord Byron of Broadway	United States	Technicolor insert	878 ft.	Metro-Goldwyn-Mayer
Extant.
1930	Leathernecking	United States	Technicolor insert	1474 ft.	RKO
Survives in Warner Bros. vault.
1930	Hit the Deck	United States	Technicolor insert	3772 ft.	RKO
Lost film.
1930	Dixiana	United States	Technicolor insert	2006 ft.	RKO
Extant.
1930	The Cuckoos	United States	Technicolor insert	833 ft.	RKO
Extant.
1931	Delicious	United States	Multicolor inserts		Fox
Extant only in black-and-white.
1931	Woman Hungry	United States	Technicolor feature	6119 ft.	Warner Bros.
Extant. On DVD.
1931	Manhattan Parade	United States	Technicolor feature	6692 ft.	Warner Bros.
16mm Safety color print (ca. 3200 ft) is held at UCLA Film and Television Archive.
1931	50 Million Frenchmen	United States	Technicolor feature	6480 ft.	Warner Bros.
Extant only in black-and-white. On DVD.
1931	Kiss Me Again	United States	Technicolor feature		Warner Bros.
Extant only in black-and-white. On DVD. Two fragments in color are held at Seaver Center.
1931	The Hawk	United States	Multicolor feature		Romantic Productions
Shot as the first feature entirely in Multicolor, it had a very limited release. Five years later using the new process Cinecolor it was re-edited and re-recorded as "Phantom of Santa Fe". On DVD.
1931	The Runaround	United States	Technicolor feature	5714 ft.	RKO
Extant only in black-and-white, except for color first reel at Museum of Modern Art. On DVD.
1931	Fanny Foley Herself	United States	Technicolor feature	6699 ft.	RKO
Complete copy at BFI National Archive under title Top of the Bill. Technicolor trailer extant at George Eastman House.
1931	Flying High	United States	Technicolor inserts		Metro-Goldwyn-Mayer
Extant in black-and-white.
1932	Tex Takes a Holiday	United States	Multicolor feature		Argosy Productions Corporation
Final feature-length film shot entirely in Multicolor. Extant. On DVD.
1931	Carnival	United Kingdom	Sequences in British Multicolor		British & Dominions Film Corporation
Extant.
1932	Doctor X	United States	Technicolor feature	7048 ft	Warner Bros.
Extant. On DVD.
1932	The Girl from Calgary	United States	Magnacolor insert		Chardwick Productions
First reel was shot in color. Extant, status of color sequence is unknown.
1932	The Death Kiss	United States	Hand-colored inserts		Sono Art-World Wide Pictures
Extant. Hand color by Gustav Brock.
1933	Mystery of the Wax Museum	United States	Technicolor feature	7184 ft	Warner Bros.
Extant. On DVD.
1933	Sairandhri	India	UFAcolor feature		Prabhat Film Company
First color film shot in India, but processed and printed in Germany. Extant. On DVD.
1934	Radio Parade of 1935	United Kingdom	Dufaycolor inserts		British International Pictures
Two sequences were filmed in Dufaycolor. Extant.
1934	Adventure Girl	United States	Hand-colored fire scene		Van Beuren Studios
Extant. Hand color by Gustav Brock.
1934	Sweden, Land of the Vikings	United States	Cinecolor feature		
First feature-length film in Cinecolor. On DVD.
1934	The Cat and the Fiddle	United States	Technicolor, Process 4 insert		Metro-Goldwyn-Mayer
Black-and-white with final reel in color. First use of three-strip Technicolor in a feature-length film. On DVD.
1934	The House of Rothschild	United States	Technicolor, Process 4 insert		Twentieth Century Pictures / United Artists
Black-and-white with final sequence in color.
1934	Hollywood Party	United States	Technicolor, Process 4 insert		Metro-Goldwyn-Mayer
Black-and-white with animated cartoon sequence in color.
1934	Kid Millions	United States	Technicolor, Process 4 insert		Samuel Goldwyn Productions / United Artists
Black-and-white with "Ice Cream Factory" musical finale in color.
1934	Seetha Kalyanam	India	Hand-colored film		Prabhat Film Company
Tamil-language film. First hand-colored film in South India. Lost film.
1935	Karnaval cvetov	Soviet Union	Russian two-color process feature		Mezhrabpomfilm
First Russian color film. Extant complete. On DVD.
1935	Jeunes filles à marier	France	Franciacolor feature		Paris Color Films
First French feature in natural color. Extant. On DVD.
1935	Legong: Dance of the Virgins	United States	Technicolor Process 3 (two-color) feature	5054 ft	DuWorld Pictures (US) / Paramount (intl)
Produced by Constance Bennett and Henri de la Falaise. Feature-length documentary filmed entirely in two-color Technicolor, one of the last uses of the older process. Restored in 1999 by UCLA Film and Television Archive. On DVD.
1935	The Little Colonel	United States	Technicolor, Process 4 insert		Fox
Black-and-white with one Technicolor sequence.
1935	Becky Sharp	United States	Technicolor, Process 4 feature		Pioneer Pictures / RKO
First feature-length film entirely in three-strip Technicolor. On DVD.
1935	Radha Kalyanam	India	Hand-colored film		Meenakshi Films
Tamil-language film. Hand-colored film. Lost film.
1935	Rathnavali	India	Hand-colored film		Saraswathy Talkies
Tamil-language hand-colored film. Lost film.
1936	Kliou the Killer	United States	Technicolor, Process 3 (two-color) feature	4917 ft	Bennett Pictures / DuWorld Pictures (US)
Final two-color Technicolor feature. Extant only in black-and-white. On DVD.
1936	The Trail of the Lonesome Pine	United States	Technicolor, Process 4 feature		Walter Wanger Productions / Paramount Pictures
First three-strip Technicolor feature filmed outdoors by natural light.
1936	We're in the Legion Now	United States	Magnacolor feature		George A. Hirliman Productions
Also known as The Rest Cure. Extant. On DVD.
1936	The Phantom of Santa Fe	United States	Cinecolor feature		Burroughs-Tarzan Enterprises
Filmed in Multicolor five years earlier as The Hawk; re-edited version released in Cinecolor as Phantom of Santa Fe. Extant. On DVD.
1936	La terre qui meurt	France	Franciacolor feature		Paris Color Films
Also known as The Land That Dies. Restored in 1992. On DVD.
1936	Pagliacci	Italy/ United Kingdom	UFAcolor inserts		Trafalgar Film Productions
Extant with color. On DVD.
1936	Solovey-Solovushko	Soviet Union	Russian two-color Process feature		Mezhrabpomfilm
First Russian feature-length narrative film in color. Extant.
1936	Bajo el sol de Loreto	Peru	Unknown color process feature		
Also known as Under Loreto's Sun. First Peruvian color feature film. Extant.
1936	The Devil on Horseback	United States	Hirlicolor feature		George A. Hirliman Productions
Long presumed lost until found in private collection in the 1980s. Complete at UCLA Film and Television Archive. On DVD.
1936	The Bold Caballero	United States	Magnacolor feature		Republic Pictures
First "Zorro" film shot in color. Extant complete. On DVD.
1936	Captain Calamity	United States	Hirlicolor feature		George A. Hirliman Productions
Extant complete. On DVD.
1937	God's Country and the Woman	United States	Technicolor, Process 4 feature		Warner Bros.
On DVD.
1937	Kisan Kanya	India	Cinecolor feature		Imperial Pictures
First Hindi color film made entirely in India.
1937	The Wedding (Wesele księżackie w Złakowie Borowym)	Poland	Agfacolor		Tadeusz Jankowski
First Polish color film (10 minutes, sound). Film (16 mm reel) survived in The National Museum of Ethnography in Warsaw.
1938	The Land of My Mother	Poland	Eastman Kodak		Ève Curie and Romuald Gantkowski
Second Polish color film (37 minutes, sound). Film (35 mm reel) survived in The Polish Institute and Sikorski Museum in London. Later Ève Curie added sound commentary about the Second World War.

== See also ==
- Color motion picture film
- List of color film systems
- List of film formats
- List of lost films
- List of incomplete or partially lost films
- List of rediscovered films
- Multicolor
- Prizmacolor
