= The Naughty Otter =

- Directed by: Charles Urban
- Release date: 1916
- Country: United Kingdom
- Languages: Silent film English intertitles

The Naughty Otter is a 1916 British short silent film directed by American filmmaker Charles Urban. He made the film, probably as part of his 'Curious Pals' series of animal films while visiting England during World War I. It features an otter on a table up to mischievous tricks and ends up knocking over a bowl of water.
