= The World, the Flesh and the Devil (1914 film) =

1914 silent drama film by Floyd Martin Thornton

The World, The Flesh and the Devil
- Directed by: F. Martin Thornton
- Written by: Laurence Cowen
- Based on: The World, the Flesh and the Devil play by Laurence Cowen
- Produced by: Charles Urban
- Starring: Frank Esmond; Stella St. Audrie; Warwick Wellington
- Distributed by: Natural Color Kinematograph Company
- Release date: 9 April 1914
- Running time: 50 minutes
- Country: United Kingdom
- Language: English

The World, the Flesh and the Devil is a 1914 British silent drama film. Now considered a lost film, it was made using the additive color Kinemacolor process.

The title comes from the Litany in the 1662 Book of Common Prayer: "From all the deceits of the world, the flesh, and the devil, spare us, good Lord."

== Plot ==
A very miserable woman hatches a plot to switch the babies of a poor family and a rich family. But the nurse hired to pull off this transfer refuses to go through with it, leaving each baby with its proper family. When the babies are grown, the man from the poor family (who has been led to believe that he did come from the rich family) goes to the house of the other and throws him out. The remainder of the film deals with the frustrations of mistaken identity.

== Cast ==
- Frank Esmond – Nicholas Brophy
- Stella St. Audrie – Caroline Stanger
- Warwick Wellington – Sir James Hall
- Charles Carter – Rupert Stanger / Dyke
- Rupert Harvey – Robert Hall
- Jack Denton – George Grigg
- Gladys Cunningham – Mrs. Brophy
- Frances Midgeley – Gertrude Grant
- Mercy Hatton – Lady Hall
- H. Agar Lyons – The Devil
- Nell Carter – Beatrice Cuthbert
- Frank Stather – Inspector Toplin
- Roger Hamilton – Wylde

== Release ==
It premièred at the Holborn Empire, High Holborn, London, on 9 April 1914 as part of a Kinemacolor season. It was one of the first natural colour feature films, preceded by With Our King and Queen Through India released in February 1912, and Making of the Panama Canal, also released in 1912.

== See also ==
- List of early color feature films
- List of lost films
