= Ada Aline Urban =

British film executive

Ada Aline Urban (15 May 1868 – 2 October 1937) was a British film company executive. She funded the Kinemacolor business established by her husband Charles Urban, helping it achieve global distribution as the first successful motion picture natural colour system. She became director of the Natural Color Kinematograph Company, which produced Kinemacolor films, as well as other of her husband's film companies. According to the Women Film Pioneers project of Columbia University Libraries, "she was the leading female figure in British film of her day".

== Early life ==
She was born in Milton, Glasgow, daughter of Polish-born languages teacher Anton Leon Gorecki, and his Scottish wife Margaret Brown. She first married Alexander James Jones in Glasgow in 1890. They had two children, Maxwell Jardine (born 1900) and Anna Marguerite, known as Margot (born 1902). The family moved to London, where Ada ran a boarding house and her husband became a travelling salesman for cinematograph and optical firm Butcher & Sons. In 1907 she met Anglo-American film producer Charles Urban, and after each had divorced their partners, they were married in London in 1910. Urban adopted her two children.

== Career ==
The Kinemacolor film process was the invention of George Albert Smith. When Charles Urban, who had funded Smith's work, wanted to exploit Kinemacolor he had to buy the patent rights from Smith. The money from this came from Ada Aline, who paid the huge sum of £5,000 in March 1909, equivalent to £649,560 in 2023. Urban launched Kinemacolor commercially the same month, forming the Natural Color Kinematograph Company to do so. Ada Jones, as she then was, became one of the directors of the company.

Ada Urban was not involved in the practicalities of film production, keeping her contributions to the boardroom. There is an account of her visiting the Natural Color Kinematograph Company's offices in London in a memoir article written by one of Urban's employees, William Thomas Crespinel:

Mrs. Urban was a grand lady, resembling, in physique, the famous and respected Lillian Russell. I recall she usually had a box of liquor-filled chocolates and would leave me a few when she left with the mild admonition to her husband, "Now don't work too late dear."

Kinemacolor enjoyed worldwide success over the next four years, thanks in particular to its focus on exotic travelogues and films of the British royal family. Ada Urban remained a director of the company until it closed, following a court case in 1913 which decreed that the Kinemacolor patent was invalid. She then became a director of its successor company, Colorfilms, over 1914–18. She was also a director of three other Urban companies: the Charles Urban Trading Company (which produced non-fiction and fiction films), Kineto (producing travel and science films) and Kinemacolor Ltd (managing the exhibition of Kinemacolor films).

== Later life ==
Charles Urban moved to America in 1915 to promote British war propaganda films. He re-established himself in Irvington, New York, after the First World War, where Ada joined him. The couple returned to London after Urban's American business collapsed in 1925. In 1932 she featured in newspapers when socialite Gertrude Gamble committed suicide by falling from a flat in Half Moon Street, London that Ada owned.

She lost some of her fortune when she invested in the patent rights for a new form of metal bottle top that her husband wanted to exploit, a venture which ended disastrously. She died in October 1937. Her husband moved to Brighton, where he died in 1942.
