= The Scarlet Letter (1913 film) =

1913 film by David Miles

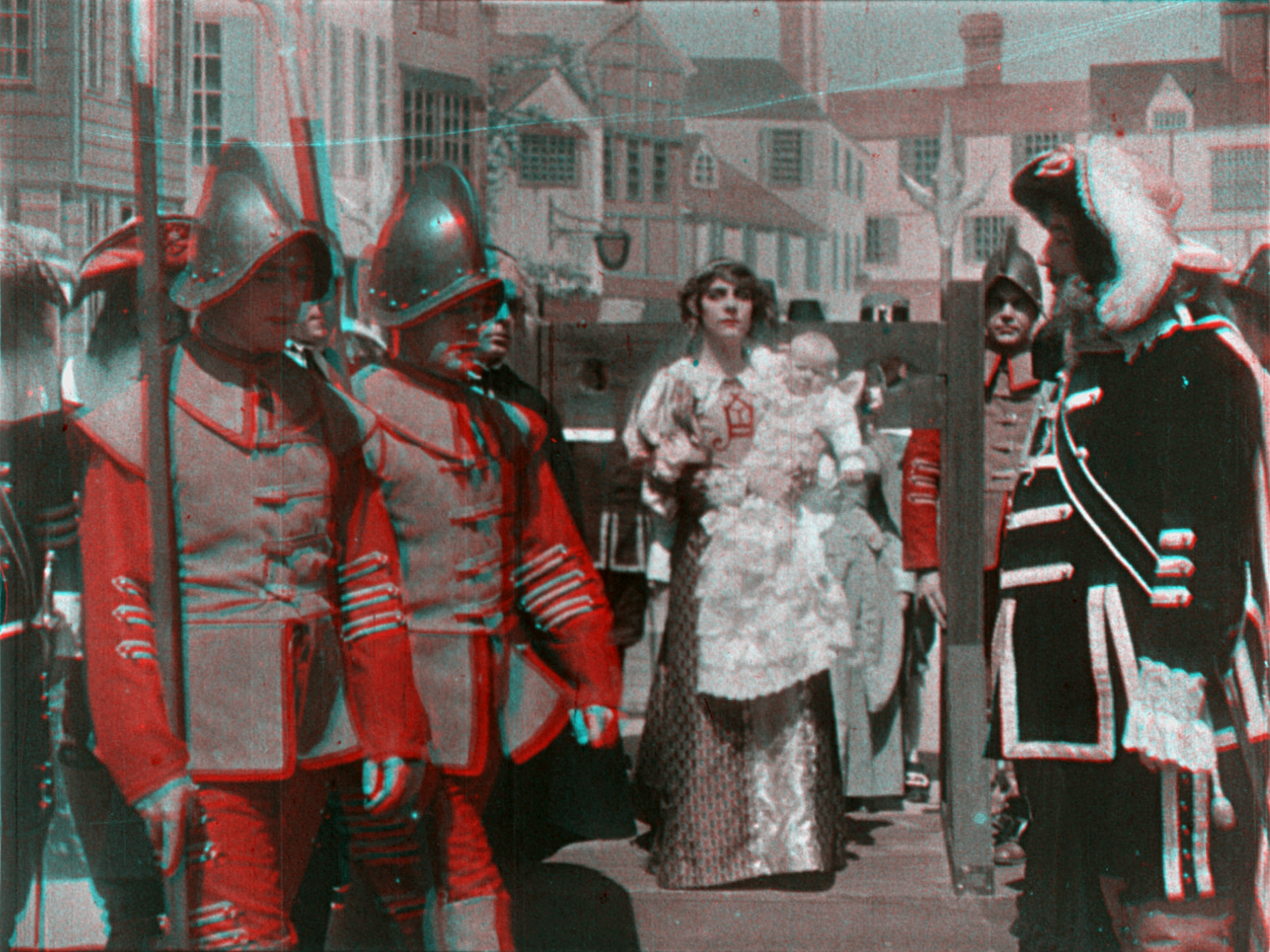
Frame from The Scarlet Letter with Linda Arvidson (center)

The Scarlet Letter is a 1913 silent film that was based on the 1850 novel of the same title by Nathaniel Hawthorne. It was produced by the Kinemacolor Company of America and directed by David Miles. It starred Linda Arvidson, Murdock MacQuarrie and Charles Perley.

== Background information ==
This film was a remake of a 1908 and a 1911 film, this film would also be remade in 1917; which is the oldest film version of the novel to exist in a complete copy. The most known of all silent versions is the 1926 film from Metro-Goldwyn-Mayer starring Lillian Gish; at the time when she was under contract to them. This film is notable for being filmed in Kinemacolor; an early color film process of the time, but only one reel of this film survives, making it unknown how long in length it actually could have been. Had the film been beyond 40 minutes in length it would have been an early color feature film.
