= Edward Raymond Turner =

British inventor and cinematographer

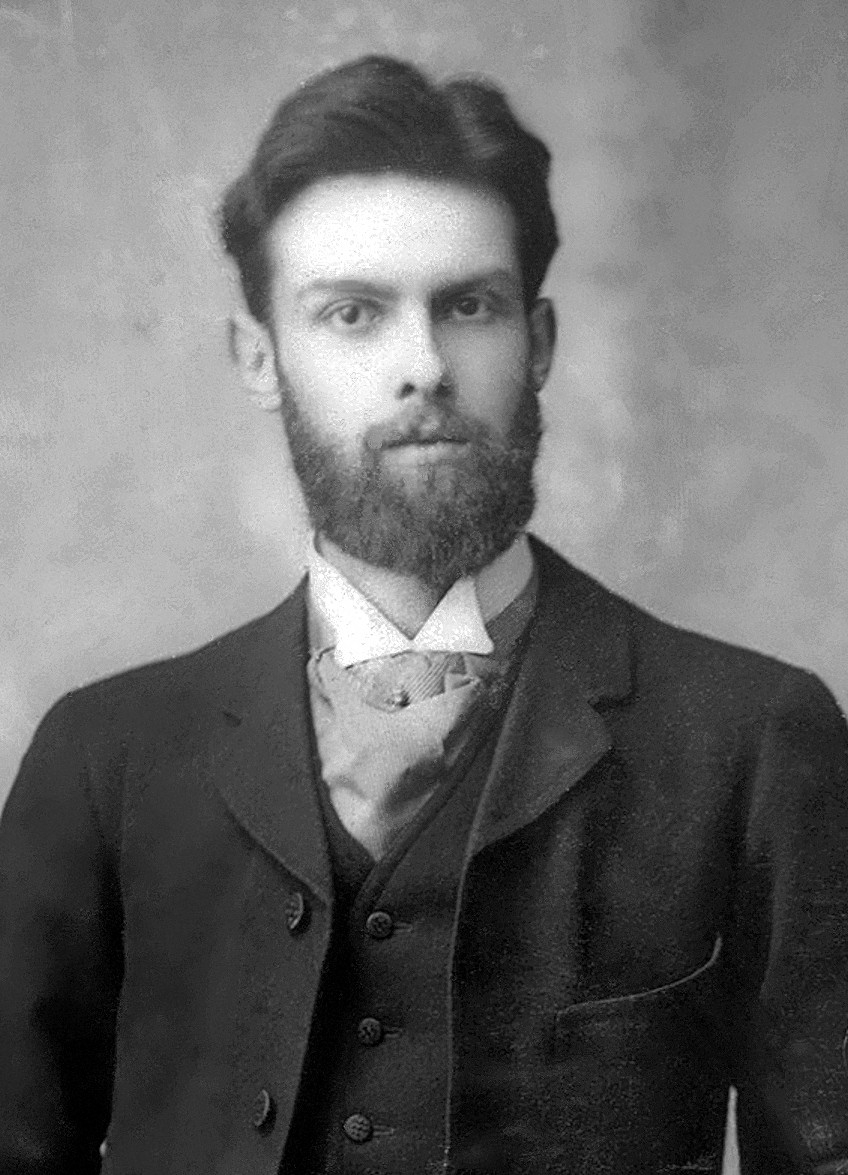
- Born: 1873; Clevedon, Somerset, England
- Died: 9 March 1903 (aged 29–30); London, England
- Occupations: Film maker, inventor
- Known for: Producing the first color motion picture film

Edward Raymond Turner (1873 – 9 March 1903) was a pioneering British inventor and cinematographer. He produced the earliest known colour motion picture film footage.

== Biography ==
Turner was born in 1873 in Clevedon, North Somerset, UK. In later life, Raymond and his wife Edith lived near the centre of Hounslow in West London. Some of Turner's colour film experiments were carried out in the back garden of this house in Montague Road and showed his three young children, Alfred, Agnes and Wilfrid.

Turner was only 29 when he died suddenly at his workshop on 9 March 1903 of a heart attack. He was buried 3 days later in the churchyard of St Leonard's parish church, Heston, Hounslow. Following his death, film producer, Charles Urban, who had been financing Turner, asked George Albert Smith to continue his work.

== Lee–Turner colour process ==
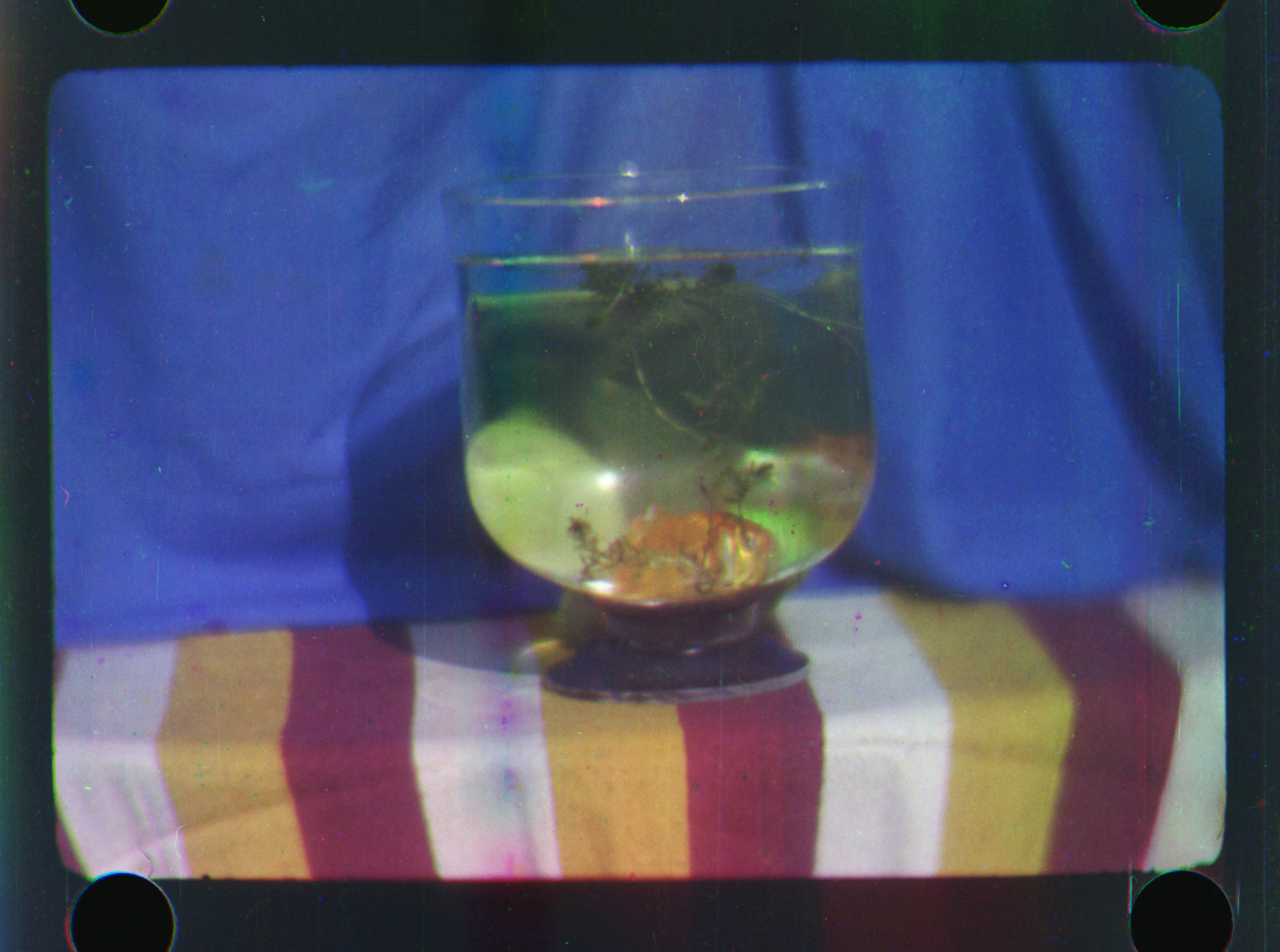
Still from footage recorded by Edward Turner in 1902

Turner is noted for his attempts to develop what is believed to be the first actually implemented colour motion picture system, initially with financial backing from Frederick Marshall Lee, then later from Charles Urban.

On 22 March 1899, while Turner was employed in the London workshop of colour photography pioneer Frederic E. Ives, Turner and Lee applied for a British patent on a 3-colour additive motion picture process. It was granted on 3 March 1900. In September 1902, Urban bought out Lee's interest and continued funding research and development.

Turner's camera used a rotating disk of three colour filters to photograph colour separations on one roll of black-and-white film. A red, green or blue-filtered image was recorded on each successive frame of film. The finished film print was projected, three frames at a time, through the corresponding colour filters.

The system suffered from two types of colour registration problems.

- First, because the three frames had not been photographed at the same time, rapidly moving objects in the scene did not match up on the screen and appeared as a blurred jumble of false colours.
- Second, and apparently much worse, mechanical instabilities in the system caused serious overall registration problems, so that the three superimposed images ceaselessly jittered and wove about relative to each other.

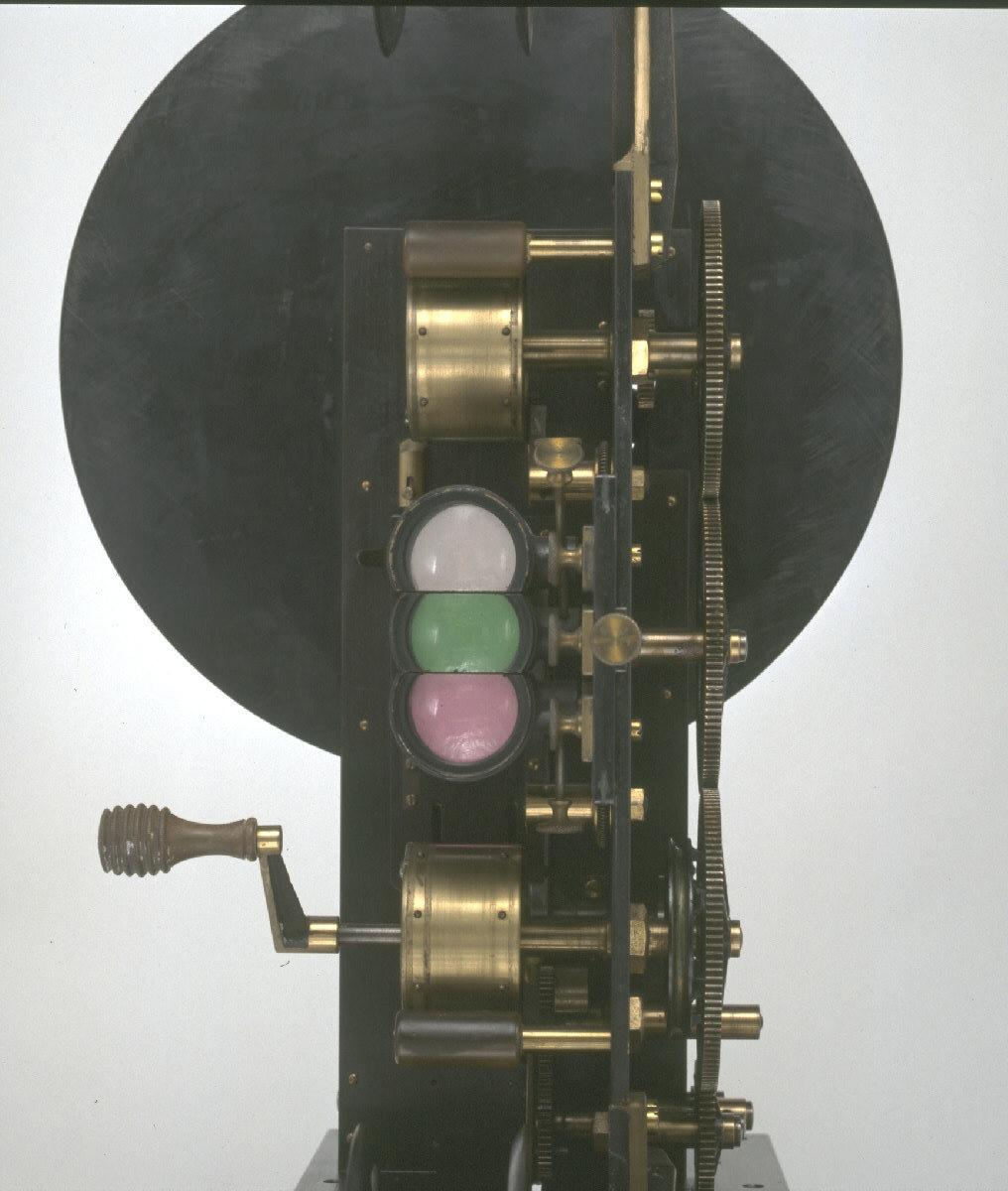
Turner's three-colour projector, 1902

When Turner died in 1903, Urban passed on the development of the process to George Albert Smith in the hope of creating a commercially viable process. Smith however found the process unworkable, and instead developed Kinemacolor, a greatly simplified two-colour version that enjoyed great commercial success until 1915.

== Legacy ==
Turner's role in the development of colour film technology was not widely appreciated until the UK's National Media Museum produced digital colour composites of his then 110-year-old test films and unveiled them publicly on 12 September 2012.

The modern digital restoration allows present-day viewers to see a more successful combination of the three colour elements than was possible with the original mechanical projection system.

== See also ==
- List of color film systems
- List of early color feature films
- List of film formats

== Bibliography ==
- Carlaw, Derek (2020). Kent County Cricketers, A to Z: Part One (1806–1914) (PDF). Cardiff: ACS.
