= Santa Claus (1912 film) =

1912 film by Walter R. Booth, R. H. Callum and F. Martin Thornton

The Kinemacolor Fairy Story Santa Claus – Mills and Boon (1912)

Santa Claus is a 1912 fantasy silent film in which a little girl dreams that she goes to Toyland, where she helps Santa Claus in his workshop.

The film was based on a stage play of the same name that played with the same cast at the Scala Theatre in London where it ran from 23 December 1912 to 8 January 1913 with a score by Theodore Holland. A suite by Holland based on music from the play was frequently broadcast at Christmas time during the 1920s and 1930s on BBC Radio. The play was a combination of live-action and two-color Kinemacolor film. In the UK the film was distributed by the Natural Color Kinematograph Co. in 1912 (610 m - 2 reels) and in the United States by the Kinemacolor Company of America in 1913 (900 m - 3 reels).

The film was directed by Walter R. Booth, R. H. Callum and F. Martin Thornton and was written by Leedham Bantock, Harold Simpson and Alfred de Manby. The detailed models of towns and buildings used in the film were made by Edward Rogers.

== Synopsis ==
Leedham Bantock as Santa Claus and Favronova as Ting-a-ling

Ting-a-ling at the Naughty Boy's window

Little Elsie is put to bed on Christmas Eve, and after her mother wishes her good night, she falls asleep. Her dream forms the theme of the story. Old Santa Claus appears to her with his assistant Ting-a-ling (named for the sleigh bells on her clothing) and persuades her to come with him up the old-fashioned fireplace. Alighting on the snow-covered roof, old St. Nicholas takes little Elsie into his sleigh and the dancing reindeer carry them off to Toyland. Arriving at Santa Claus' workshop, little Elsie is warmly welcomed by all the little gnomes, and sees the many toys in this workshop. The photography brings out every detail of color and mechanism, as do the close views of Old Santa Claus enplaning the different toys. The Earth revolves in space while in the distance the dashing reindeer approach with Santa Claus and little Elsie.

Two little children are seen at their mother's knee praying for the safe return of their father, who is away at sea. Little Elsie and Old Santa overhear their petition and immediately communicate with Old Father Neptune at the bottom of the sea, to grant their request. The scene reproduces King Neptune's Court with his water nymphs gathered about him. Little Elsie eagerly follows Santa Claus on his route, delighting in his magic and generosity in the children's ward of one of the big hospitals. Home again, Elsie is safely tucked into her bed by Old Santa and later is awakened from her dream by the entrance of her mother on Christmas morning. Little Elsie happily discovers that her own bed is covered with gifts from the fairy toy shop she visited in her dreams.

== Cast ==
- Leedham Bantock – Santa Claus
- Margaret Favronova – Ting-a-ling

== Scenes in the film ==
Ting-a-ling and the Cuckoo Clock

- Ting-a-ling Wakes Father Christmas
- Toyland
- Good-bye to Christmas Land
- The Journey to Earth
- The House Tops
- The Cuckoo Clock
- Telephoning to Father Neptune
- The Star of Sweet Content
- The Naughty Boy
- Father Christmas and the Moonbeams
- Catching the Black Dog
- The Children's Hospital
- Through the Telescope
- Good-Bye! Father Christmas!

== Gallery ==
Gnomes at work in the forge at Toyland

The Court of Old Father Neptune
