= William Frederick Jury =

British film businessman (b. 1870, d. 1944)

Sir William Frederick Jury (December 5, 1870 - August 2, 1944) was an influential film businessman in Britain. He led Jury Imperial Pictures, a British film production company during the silent film era. The company was a leading renter of films and contracted to distribute official British films. It was also a distributor of American films and was active in British colonies. Jury was also involved in distributing propaganda films for the British government. In 1914, he corresponded with William N. Selig.

Jury distributed a film about the Battle of the Somme and a sequel about the Battle of the Ancre for the British government. Jury's film company was the exclusive distributor in Britain for American film production company Metro Pictures.

Jury was awarded a knighthood in 1918. He established a convalescent home for film industry veterans. Jury owned the New Theatre in Bromley for a time.

== Filmography ==
- Britain Prepared (1915)
- The Battle of the Somme (1916)
- The Battle of the Ancre and the Advance of the Tanks (1917)
