= William Norman Lascelles Davidson =

English soldier and cinematographer (c. 1871 – 1935)

Experimental color film made by Davidson and Jumeaux, c. 1902/3.

Captain William Norman Lascelles Davidson (c. 1871 – 31 January 1935) was an English soldier who was an early experimenter in color cinematography.

Davidson was born in Notting Hill, London to Lt-Col. Alfred Augustus Davidson (died 1885), on the staff of the Madras Army, part of the British Indian Army (formerly of the Nair Brigade); he was an amateur botanist and fellow of the Linnean Society of London. Poor health meant Alfred Davidson spent several periods in England on sick-leave; having retired from military service, he died after attending the Handel Festival at the Crystal Palace in London. William Davidson attained the rank of Captain of the 4th Battalion of the Kings Liverpool Regiment.

Between 1898 and 1906, Davidson spent around £3,000 trying to create a workable natural-color motion picture system. Davidson worked together with Dr. Benjamin Jumeaux. Although their work was unsuccessful, they influenced George Albert Smith who developed the color process, known as Kinemacolor.

Davidson lived at 20, Middle Street, Brighton.
