= Britain Prepared =

1915 British film by Charles Urban

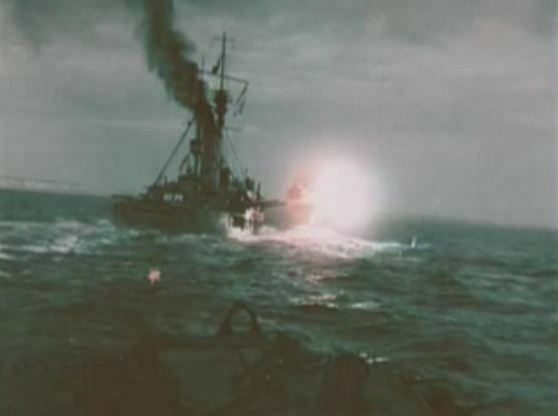
- Kinemacolor still from the film
- Produced by: Charles Urban
- Cinematography: Edward Tong, Charles Urban, Charlie Weddup, Fred Wilson
- Distributed by: War Propaganda Bureau, The Cinema Committee
- Release date: 29 December 1915
- Running time: 165 minutes
- Country: United Kingdom
- Languages: Silent; English intertitles

Britain Prepared is a 1915 British documentary feature film directed by Charles Urban. The film is silent and made in black-and-white with some colour sequences in the Kinemacolor additive color process.

The film documents Britain's military preparedness, showing scenes of the army and navy in preparation for war, and the manufacture of munitions. The film was made by the Cinema Committee, comprising Charles Urban, William Jury of Jury's Imperial Pictures, and Tommy Welsh of Gaumont, at the behest of the covert British propaganda organisation, the War Propaganda Bureau (also known as Wellington House). It was the first major British official film of World War I.

== Production ==
The film was produced during the Autumn of 1915. The army sections were filmed at Aldershot by Gaumont camera operators in September, showing the training of recruits and culminating in a review of troops by George V on 30 September. The naval scenes were filmed in September and October by Charles Urban, who operated one of the cameras, alongside Teddy Tong, Charlie Weddup, and Fred Wilson. The fleet was filmed off Scapa Flow under strict security, as naval officialdom was concerned that the film would depict identifiable stretches of coastline. Sequences of the fleet at sea were filmed in Kinemacolor. The section of munitions manufacture used film previously produced by Vickers Ltd, and included scenes showing women munition workers. The film also featured the launch of the battleship HMS Revenge and the launch of a submarine.

== Release and reception ==
The film premiered at the Empire Theatre, London, on 29 December 1915, before an audience of political and military dignitaries. It was introduced by the First Lord of the Admiralty Arthur Balfour. It was shown in two halves: 'The New Army in the Making' and 'The Sure Shield of Britain and Empire'. It was accompanied by orchestral music specially composed by Herman Finck.

These are the sections of the film as it was originally exhibited:

Part I: The New Army in the Making

1. Recruiting and Drilling of Volunteers
2. Making Ammunition
3. Trench Work (training in England)
4. Cavalry, Artillery, and Mounted Infantry
5. Royal Flying Corps and Field Telegraph
6. Motor-Cycle Machine-Gun Battalion at Work
7. Provisioning an Army
8. His Majesty King George V

Part II: The Sure Shield of Britain and Empire

1. Building and Launching a Battleship
2. On a British Mine-Sweeper
3. ‘The Silver Sentinel’
4. ‘The Iron Grip’ (Kinemacolor)
5. A Battle Squadron at Sea (Kinemacolor)
6. With the Grand Fleet in the North Sea
7. Jack Afloat
8. Life on Board H.M.S. ‘Queen Elizabeth’ (Kinemacolor)
9. The Submarine Service
10. The ‘Hornets’ of the Fleet
11. ‘Watch-dogs of the Empire in Action’ (Kinemacolor)
12. ‘All’s Well’ (Sunset on Calm Surroundings)
13. ‘God Save the King’

The film ran for six weeks at the Empire, then was converted into a shorter, monochrome-only version for general release in the UK and overseas. A book of the film was produced with text by Archibald Hurd and a series of twenty-four colour postcards with scenes from the film was issued by the Photochrom Company.

The film was widely praised in Britain for its propagandist and educational value. W. G. Faulkner, film critic of The Evening News, said the film "ought certainly to be shown, not only in every part of the British Isles but throughout the Empire and in every neutral country the world over. There would be no need for any other propaganda; no literature could affect half as well as these pictures."

German newspaper Rheinsche Westphaelische Zeitung said of the film: "We must admit, a more clever advertisement could hardly be made by the English Ministry of War for its Army and Fleet and its war services in general. This speculation on the sensibilities of the cinema visitor will not fail of its object. Strongly recommended for imitation."

It was exhibited overseas in many countries, usually managed by local concessionaries, but for some key territories special representation was required. Tommy Welsh took the film to France, the novelist Gilbert Frankau took it to Italy, and A.S. Paulsen of Nordisk Film took it to Scandinavia. Theatrical circuit manager Maurice Bandman handled the film in India and the Far East. Charles Urban took the film to the USA, retitling it How Britain Prepared. He experienced great difficulty in getting the film shown, because of exhibitors' resistance to propaganda and protests from German American interests.

A monochrome copy of the film survives at the Imperial War Museum. Two minutes of the Kinemacolor sequences were recently discovered in the United States.

== See also ==
- List of early color feature films
