= Milton, Glasgow =

District in Glasgow, Scotland

Coordinates: 55.900754°N 4.246217°W

Milton
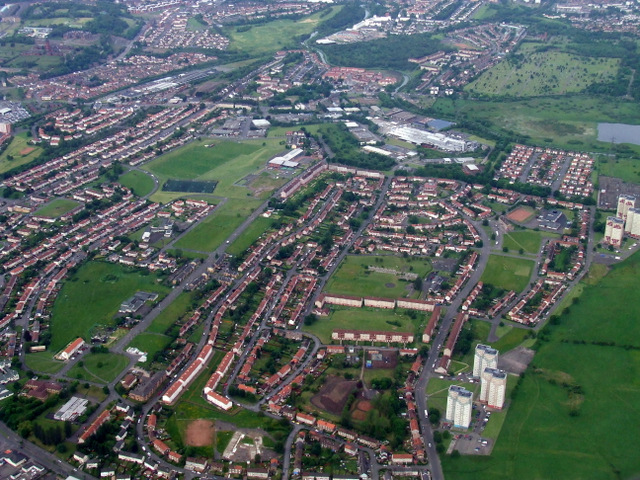
- Aerial view of Milton from the east (2012)

- Location within Glasgow
- OS grid reference: NS596697
  - Edinburgh: 66.676 km
  - London: 559.285 km
- Council area: Glasgow City Council
- Lieutenancy area: Glasgow
- Country: Scotland
- Sovereign state: United Kingdom
- Post town: GLASGOW
- Postcode district: G22 7
- Dialling code: 0141
- Police: Scotland
- Fire: Scottish
- Ambulance: Scottish
- UK Parliament: Glasgow North East
- Scottish Parliament: Glasgow Maryhill and Springburn

Milton is a district in the Scottish city of Glasgow, situated north of the River Clyde. The housing scheme is about 2 1/2 miles (4 kilometres) north of Glasgow City Centre and forms part of the northern edge of the city's urban area.

== Location and history ==
The construction of Milton started in the late 1940s as a part of a general post-war construction programme by the Glasgow Corporation to deal with housing shortages and slum clearance. The district is bordered to the south and east by Ashgill Road, dividing it from the older Parkhouse neighbourhood. It is also bordered by Liddesdale Road, which had previously connected Colston to Balmore Road. The new streets were named after the Scottish islands: Berneray, Birsay, Castlebay, Cathay, Egilsay, Longay, Mingulay, Ornsay, Raasay, Ronaldsay, Scalpay, Scaraway, Shillay, Skerray, Stornoway, Torogay, Vallay and Westray.

The area had only a few private homes (in Liddesdale Road/Birsay Road and Loskin Drive) prior to the new development. The initial scheme was completed in 1952. More housing was added in later years, including high-rise flats in Castlebay Drive in the late 1960s. Housing styles varied from gray stone apartment houses with back and front doors, to brown or white clad pre-fabricated apartments and 4 storey flats of 8 units each, some with open verandas. All housing was rented social housing.

Milton suffered from social problems such as gang fighting and drug abuse. The gang fighting caused urban decay by the end of the 1960s, and drug abuse made Milton one of the worst drug areas in United Kingdom.

In the late 1980s, many of the flats in the area were replaced with social housing units more suitable for urban living. The last of the original flats in Scaraway Street was demolished in 2006 and parts of the area stand desolate.

== Politics ==
Milton is part of the Glasgow North East constituency, which has been represented in the House of Commons by Anne McLaughlin of the Scottish National Party (SNP) from 2015 to 2017, Paul Sweeney from 2017 to 2019 and McLaughlin again from 2019 to 2024, Maureen Burke from july 2024 to present.

Milton is part of the Glasgow Maryhill and Springburn constituency, and is represented by Bob Doris of the Scottish National Party in the Scottish Parliament.

At local Glasgow City Council level, Milton has formed a core part of the Canal ward since 2007.

== Education ==
Children attend the merged St. Ambrose and St. Augustine's schools known as St. Monica's (Milton) Primary School. This holds Milton's Community Campus. Non denomination schools in the area are Miltonbank Primary School and Chirnsyde Primary School.

== Religion ==
Catholic and Methodist churches are located in nearby Liddesdale Square. The Methodist Church shares a Minister with the Methodist Church in Kilsyth and Colston Milton Church in Egilsay Crescent (Church of Scotland). The Church of Scotland Manse is located on Birsay Road.

== Services ==
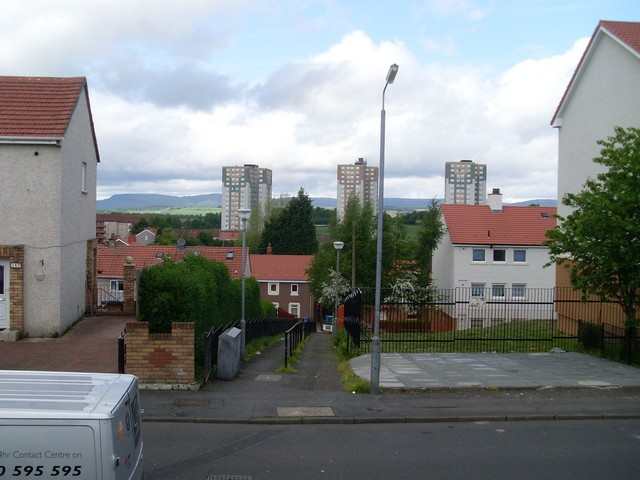
The housing stock in Milton includes terraced houses, tenements, and tower blocks

The scheme suffered from poor social planning. Pubs, cinemas or community amenities were accessible only by bus/car. A community centre was built in Liddesdale Road in the early 1970s. No factories or industry offered jobs in the area. The scheme was part of the Maryhill parliamentary constituency and is now within Glasgow North East.

The four shopping areas were Skerray Street, Scaraway Street, Westray Circus and Liddesdale Square. Buses M3,8,75 and 128 serve the area.

Community activists successfully campaigned to prevent the conversion of the site of the demolished Saint Augustine’s Secondary School into housing. Its future remains in doubt.

LoveMilton, a community development trust for the area, obtained planning permission for a multi-purpose community facility.

== Notable persons ==
- Kenny Dalglish, footballer (Celtic, Liverpool and Scotland), whose first team played on the spare ground at Egilsay Street and was called "Milton Milan"
- Jeannie Fisher, Television Actress
- Stephen Maguire, snooker player
- Frank McAvennie, footballer (Celtic, West Ham and Scotland)
- Paul Riley, Actor (Still game, Chewin' the fat)
- Dylan McGeouch, footballer (Celtic, Hibernian, Aberdeen and Scotland)
- Ada Aline Urban (1868–1937), film executive

== See also ==
- Districts of Glasgow
- Glasgow tower blocks
- Politics of Glasgow
