= Gustav Brock =

American painter

Gustav Frederick Brock
- Born: 19 August 1880; San Francisco
- Occupation: Painter
- Spouse: Else Bardenfleth (1915-1945) Else Cecilie Emilie Nielsen (1903-1909)
- Children: Gustav Lave Brock
- Father: Gustav Brock

Gustav Frederick Brock (c. 1881 – 1945) was a portrait painter, portrait miniature artist, and an expert on the hand coloring of motion pictures. He was the son of the Danish painter Gustav Brock (1849–1887).

He was born in San Francisco and educated in Copenhagen, at the Royal Academy in Dresden and later in Paris with M.A.F. Gorguet.

In 1910 he was the sole representative for Denmark at the International Art Exhibition at Buenos Aires. This exhibition included an official portrait of the Queen of Denmark which was later awarded a silver medal at the Panama–Pacific International Exposition, San Francisco, 1915 where Brock was again the sole representative for Denmark.

In 1920 the French Government acquired Brock's painting of the 7th Regiment N.Y.H.G. reviewed by Marshall Joffre at Grant's Tomb. Other noteworthy portraits and miniatures are in the permanent collections of the Musee Nationale de Buenos Aires; a miniature of King George of Greece in the collection of Queen Alexandria; The Archbishop of Buenos Aires in the Cathedral of Buenos Aires; the wife of Marechal da Fonseca, President of Brazil, Salon des Artistes Francais 1914, etc. Brock is Officer d'Academie de France and Lieutenant in the Royal Danish Army.

Brock was a miniature artist and expert on the hand-coloring of motion pictures. In 1922 he was represented by Ehrich Galleries, New York, which published a folio in conjunction with an exhibition of miniature paintings held at their gallery.

During his professional career, Brock hand-colored scenes from a number of motion pictures, including Erich von Stroheim's Foolish Wives (1922), The Death Kiss (1932) with Bela Lugosi, and the independently made feature film Adventure Girl (1934).

== Personal life ==
He was the son of the Danish uniform painter Gustav Brock (1849–1887). He first married Else Cecilie Emilie Nielsen (1985 -1930) in 1903 and had a son, Gustav Lave Brock in 1904. After they divorced around the year 1909 he remarried in 1915 and went to America with his new wife Else Bardentfleth Brock. Else Cecilie Emilie Nielsen later married Ove Krak, the son of Thorvald Krak.

== See also ==
- List of early color feature films
