= Natural Color Kinematograph Company =

British film company (1909–1914)

The Natural Color Kinematograph Company, Ltd.
- Company type: Film Company
- Founded: 16 March 1909; 116 years ago
- Founder: Charles Urban
- Defunct: 11 April 1914
- Fate: Voluntary Liquidation
- Successor: Color Films Ltd.
- Headquarters: 89–91 Wardour Street, London (until June 1910); 80–82 Wardour Street, London (from June 1910)
- Key people: Charles Urban; Ada Aline (Jones) Urban; John Avery; William H. Hickey
- Products: Kinemacolor films and licences

The Natural Color Kinematograph Company was a British company formed by Charles Urban in 1909. It sold licences and produced films in Kinemacolor, the first successful colour motion picture process.

== History ==
In March 1909, to capitalise on Kinemacolor, which had first been shown to the public in February, Charles Urban formed the Natural Color Kinematograph Company. The company's directors included himself, his future wife Ada Aline Jones, and John Avery.

Jones purchased the patent rights to Kinemacolor for £5,000 from its inventor, George Albert Smith. This acquisition enabled Urban to sell Kinemacolor licences around the world through the Natural Color Kinematograph Company. Outside of the United Kingdom, Kinemacolor achieved long-term success only in Japan and in the United States under the Kinemacolor Company of America.

In the beginning of the First Balkan War they sent their cinematographer Ch. Mavroyenis, of Greek origin, to the war zone in northern Greece.

=== Success ===
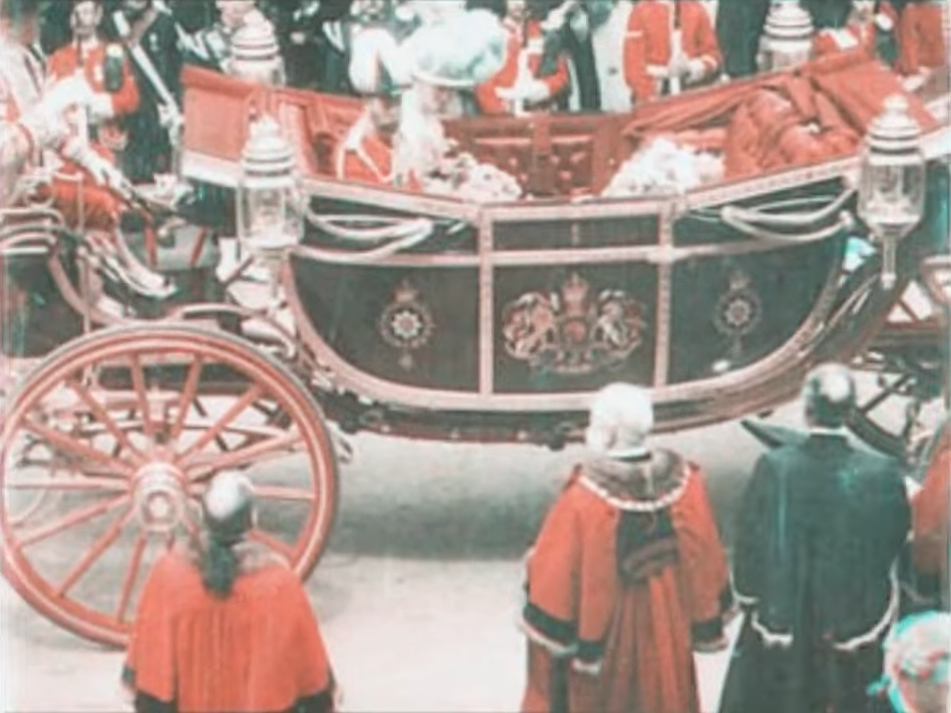
Frame from Coronation of George V (1911)

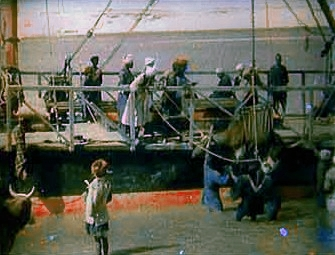
Frame from Nubia, Wadi Halfa and the Second Cataract (1911), one of the many Kinemacolor travelogues

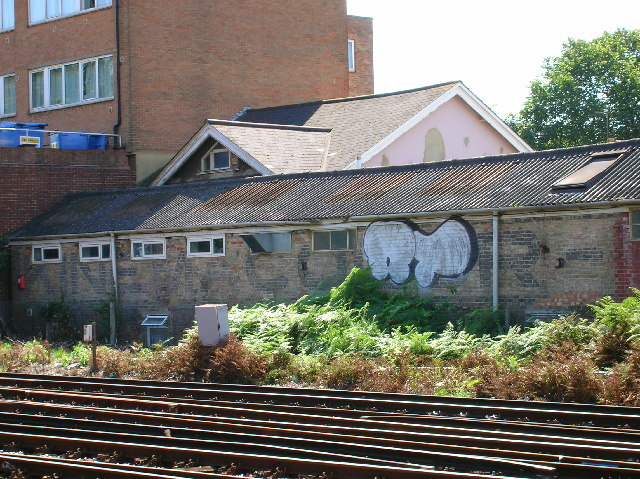
The former Kinemacolor studios in Hove, used for narrative films by the Natural Color Kinematograph Company, seen in 2005. The word "KINEMACOLOR" is visible, painted to the side of the building.

The company's first successful films were centred around royal events between 1910 and 1911. These included Funeral of Edward VII (1910), Unveiling of the Queen Victoria Memorial (1911), Coronation of George V (1911), Investiture of the Prince of Wales (1911), and most notably, With Our King and Queen Through India (1912). These films received acclaim from various newspapers and journals. Another popular film was From Bud to Blossom (1910), made by F. Percy Smith, showcasing time-lapse footage of flowers growing.

Following the success of Funeral of Edward VII in 1910, the company received its own building at 80–82 Wardour Street in London, known as "Kinemacolor House". Its previous location was the Urbanora House across the street, which housed the Charles Urban Trading Company. Films produced by the Natural Color Kinematograph Company were screened throughout the United Kingdom and gained popularity among the British royal family. In February 1911, Urban secured a lease for the Scala Theatre in London, which became the flagship venue for showing Kinemacolor.

Narrative film production began in 1910 at studios in Hove, purchased from James Williamson, and additional studios in Nice, which were used during winter months. The first fiction film to be released was By Order of Napoleon in November 1910. It was directed by Theo Bouwmeester, who made several other films for the company, including Oedipus Rex (1911), Dandy Dick of Bishopsgate (1911), La Tosca (1911), and a western named Fate (1911). F. Martin Thornton directed films such as Santa Claus (1912), Little Lord Fauntleroy (1914) and the feature-length The World, the Flesh and the Devil (1914). Urban acquired an estate in Teddington, near London, in 1913, which was used by the company for Kinemacolor films. Criticisms of the narrative films produced by the Natural Color Kinematograph Company included poor acting and direction, as well as the necessity for an open-air studio due to the light-absorbing Kinemacolor process.

Managerial conflict between the Natural Color Kinematograph Company and the Kinemacolor Company of America led Charles Urban to travel to America in early 1914 to sever relations between the two companies, despite them having collaborated on film productions such as The Rivals (1913).

=== Decline ===
In 1913, after years of dispute, William Friese-Greene, inventor of the rival Biocolour system, challenged the validity of Smith's Kinemacolor patent at the Royal Courts of Justice. The court initially favoured Kinemacolor, leading Friese-Green to appeal the decision. In March 1914, the Court of Appeal found the Kinemacolor patent invalid and overturned the original verdict. Consequently, Kinemacolor lost not only its patent protection but its commercial value and exclusivity. Urban promptly liquidated the Natural Color Kinematograph Company to protect the shareholders.

Hoping that the House of Lords would reverse the Court of Appeal's decision, the company continued trading as Color Films Ltd. at the same London address. Despite producing the feature film With The Fighting Forces of Europe about World War I, public interest for Kinemacolor began to fade. In April 1915, the House of Lords upheld the Court of Appeal's verdict and Smith's patent was revoked. Although the Natural Color Kinematograph Company produced hundreds of Kinemacolor films, most are now considered lost.
