= Little Lord Fauntleroy (1914 film) =

1914 film by Floyd Martin Thornton

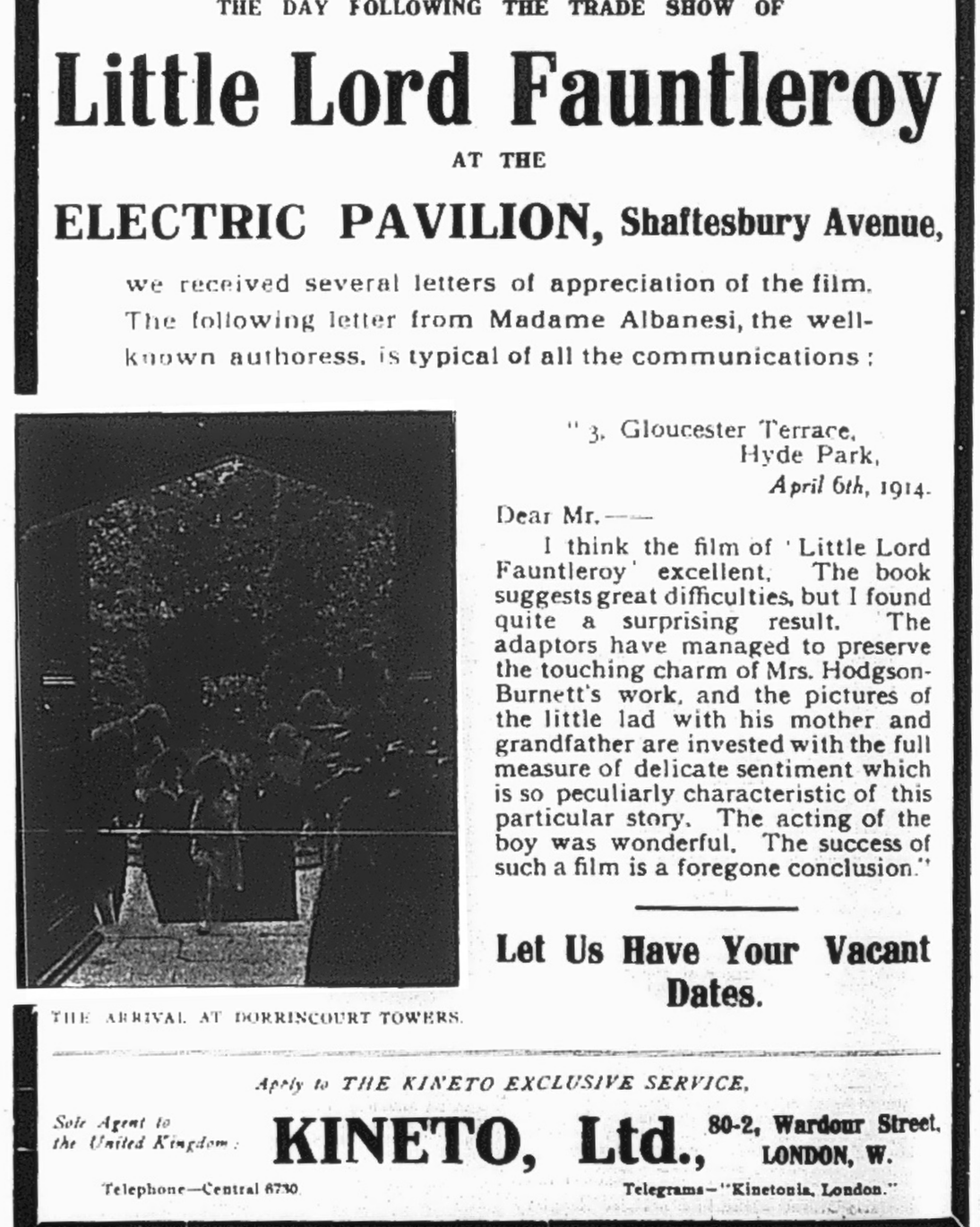
- Advertisement in The Bioscope, 16 April 1914
- Directed by: Floyd Martin Thornton
- Based on: Little Lord Fauntleroy; 1886 novel by Frances Hodgson Burnett
- Starring: H. Agar Lyons; Gerald Royston; Jane Wells
- Production company: Natural Color Kinematograph Company
- Distributed by: Kineto (UK); Shubert Feature Film (US)
- Release date: April 1914
- Running time: 1,609 m (5 reels); 59 min 35 s
- Country: United Kingdom
- Languages: Silent; English intertitles

Little Lord Fauntleroy is a 1914 British silent drama film directed by Floyd Martin Thornton and starring H. Agar Lyons, Gerald Royston in the title role, and Jane Wells. It was based on the 1886 novel Little Lord Fauntleroy by Frances Hodgson Burnett. The film was produced by the Natural Color Kinematograph Company. It was distributed in the UK by Kineto Ltd. and released in the US by Shubert Feature Film (later World Film Company) in April of that year. It was one of the first feature-length films to be made in colour, using the Kinemacolor two-colour additive colour process.

Originally, Joan Morgan had been considered for the part of Cedric Erroll as Lord Fauntleroy, before 13-year old Gerald Royston was given the role. Born in 1901 and the younger brother of Roy Royston, the British child actor appeared in silent films from 1913 to 1915. His casting in Little Lord Fauntleroy was one of the earliest starring roles for a child actor in a feature-length film.

An advertisement in the cinema trade journal Bioscope cited English writer Effie Albanesi's praise of the film. She called it "excellent" and commended the film's adaptation of Burnett's novel, saying, "the acting of the boy [Royston] was wonderful".

== Cast ==
- H. Agar Lyons as Earl of Dorincourt
- Gerald Royston as Cedric Erroll (Lord Fauntleroy)
- Jane Wells as 'Dearest' Erroll
- Bernard Vaughan as Lawyer Havisham
- V. Osmond as Minna Tipton
- Frank Stather as Ben Tipton
- D. Callam as Tommy Tipton
- Harry Edwards as Dick Tipton
- F. Tomkins as Silas Hobbs
- Miss Nelson as Mary - the Housemaid
- Fred Eustace as Bevis
- B. Murray as Maurice
- Edward Viner as Capt. Cedric Erroll
- Stella St. Audrie as Bridget
- John East as Thomas
- Jack Denton

== See also ==
- List of early color feature films
