= Kinemacolor Company of America =

American film company (1910 - 1924)

Kinemacolor Company of America, Inc.
- Type: Film company
- Founded: April 1910; 116 years ago
- Founder: Gilbert Henry Aymar; James Klein Bowen
- Defunct: 1924
- Headquarters: Allentown, Pennsylvania, U.S. (April 1910 - 1911) 145 West 45th Street, New York City, New York, U.S. (1911 - 1912) 1600 Broadway, New York City, New York, U.S. (1912 - c. June 1914)
- Key people: John J. Murdock; Henry J. Brock; David Miles; Theodore Marston
- Products: Kinemacolor films, rights and equipment
- Subsidiaries: Weber-Fields-Kinemacolor Company

The Kinemacolor Company of America was an American company founded in 1910 by Gilbert H. Aymar and James K. Bowen. It distributed and produced films made in Kinemacolor, the first successful color motion picture process.

== History ==
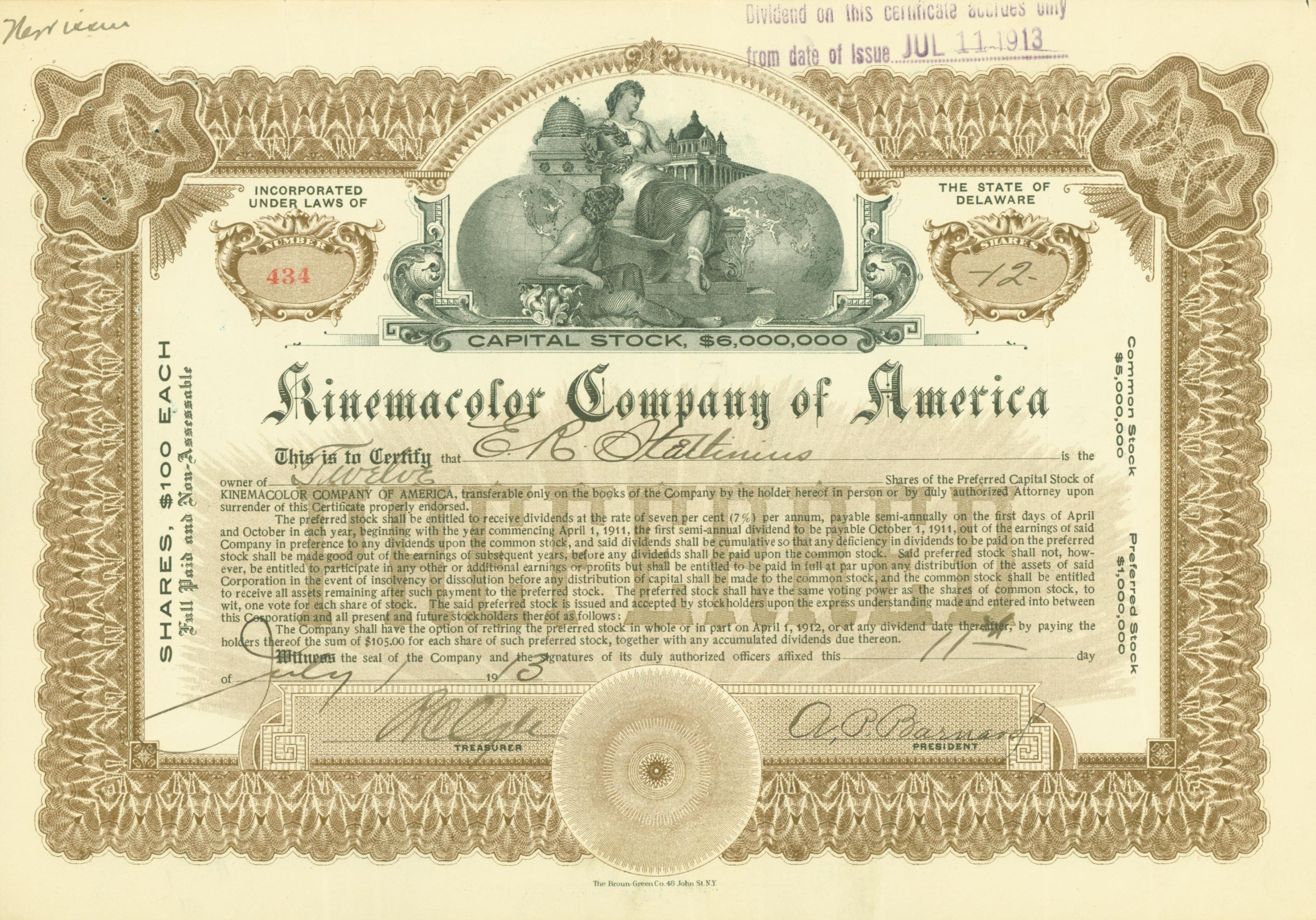
Share of the Kinemacolor Company of America, issued 11 July 1913

On 11 December 1909 in Madison Square Garden in New York City, the first exhibition of Kinemacolor took place before an audience of 1,200 people. It was presented by British filmmaker George Albert Smith, the inventor of Kinemacolor, and Charles Urban. Urban failed to secure a deal with the Motion Picture Patents Company and instead hoped to sell the rights to Kinemacolor in the United States.

=== Early history ===
The patent rights were purchased by two businessmen from Allentown, Pennsylvania named Gilbert H. Aymar and James K. Bowen for $200,000. They formed the Kinemacolor Company of America in April 1910 with offices in Allentown. The initial plan was not to shoot films, but to exhibit Kinemacolor films made by Urban's Natural Color Kinematograph Company in variety theatres. The company also sold territorial licenses for the exhibition of Kinemacolor. A factory was acquired in Allentown to manufacture Kinemacolor equipment.

They purchased five projectors which were set up in Allentown, New York, Boston, Philadelphia and Chicago to attract potential investors. Among those who first saw Kinemacolor films in the United States was French actress Sarah Bernhardt. However, the business suffered from technical and management issues.

=== 1911 reorganization ===
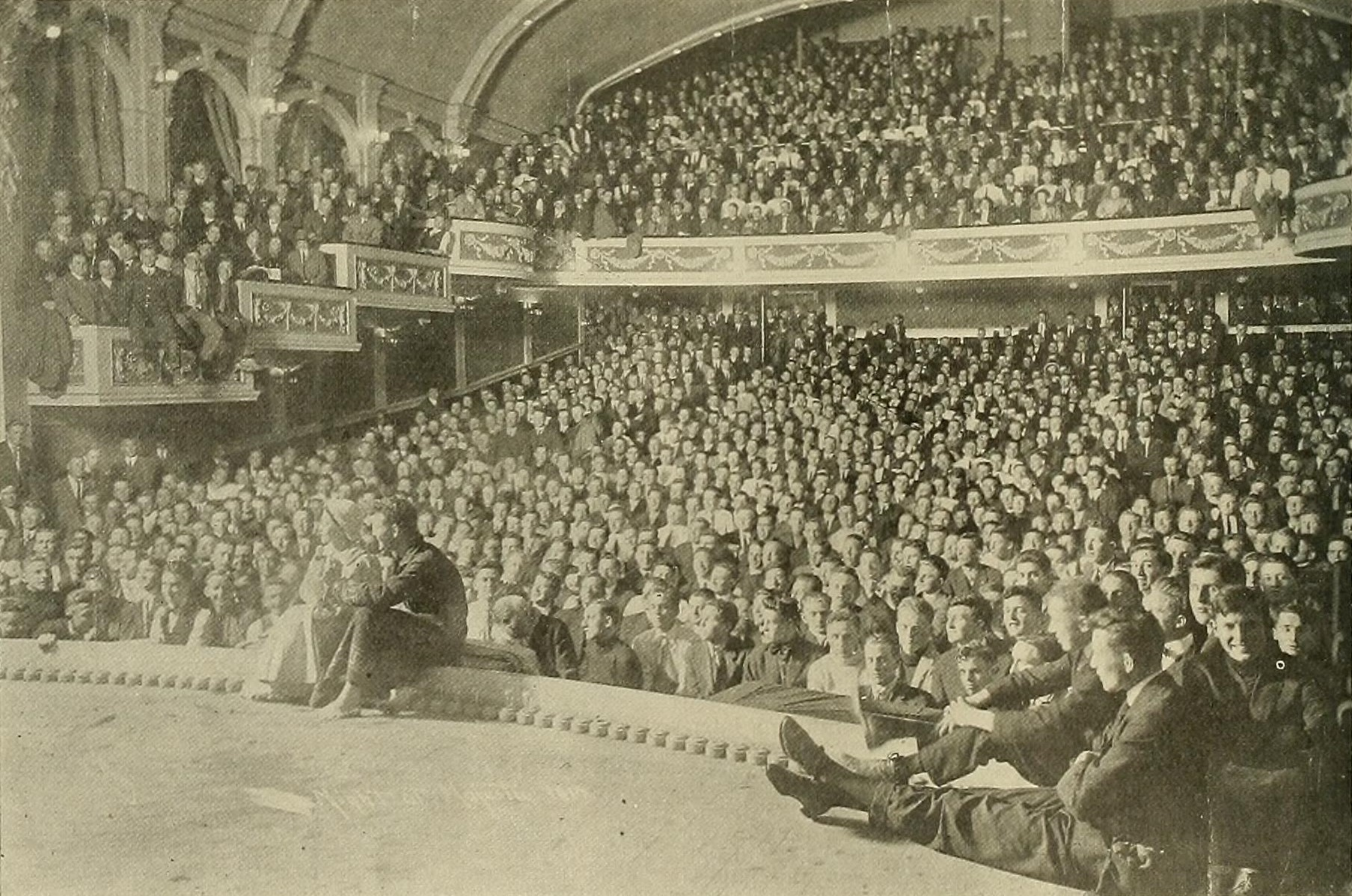
Audience watching the Kinemacolor documentary Steam at Majestic Theater in Ann Arbor, Michigan, 1913

In January 1911, while Charles Urban still retained some control over the company, he approached George H. Burr & Co., a New York-based stock speculation firm. The firm purchased the Kinemacolor patent and company, subsequently floating a new Kinemacolor Company of America. A few months later, in April, the company and the patent were sold to John J. Murdock with offices in New York City.

The company's first successes were screenings of the British-made films Coronation of George V (1911) and With Our King and Queen Through India (1912), which achieved the same popularity as in their home country.

In 1911, the company produced The Clansman in the southern United States. The film, directed by William F. Haddock, was based on the controversial novel of the same name written by Thomas Dixon. According to different sources, the ten-reel film was either completed by January 1912, or production was halted after spending $25,000, resulting in little more than a reel of poor footage. The film never appeared, for reasons believed to be either unresolved legal issues regarding story rights, issues with the Kinemacolor process and inadequate direction. The scriptwriter Frank Woods showed his work to D. W. Griffith, who later created his own film adaptation of the novel, titled The Birth Of A Nation (1915).

In October 1912, the Kinemacolor Company of America started a major advertising campaign, for which it made more than 300 films in Kinemacolor. One of these films, titled See America First, was filmed by a camera crew led by Alfred Gosden in various national parks in the United States. The company also arranged with the United States Department of the Navy to film scenes of battleships. The most notable production during this period was the two-hour long documentary Making of the Panama Canal (1912), which was so popular that it was even shown by Charles Urban in Britain. The company also filmed the inauguration of President Wilson in 1913. Kinemacolor was successful and considerable competition to regular black and white films, such as the shows of Burton Holmes and Lyman Howe.

By the end of 1912, the company was producing numerous narrative films with David Miles as head of dramatic production. They hired many skilled actors, including Linda Arvidson Griffith. Studios were located in Whitestone, New York, and at 4500 Sunset Boulevard in Hollywood. The Hollywood studios, where How To Live 100 Years (1913) starring Lillian Russell was filmed, were taken over by D. W. Griffith in June 1913.

The company obtained a license from the Motion Picture Patents Company in August 1913 to show Kinemacolor in regular, licensed cinemas. Despite this, the company faced financial constraints and had trouble producing enough films to sustain itself with the expensive Kinemacolor process. Additionally, many exhibitors hesitated including Kinemacolor into their programs due to the requirement for specialized projectors.

In October 1913, David Miles left the company, being replaced by Theodore Marston and a new studio was opened in Lowville, New York. The subsidiary Weber-Fields-Kinemacolor Company was formed in November 1913, dedicated to making films with the Weber and Fields comedy duo and Roy McCardell as the scriptwriter.

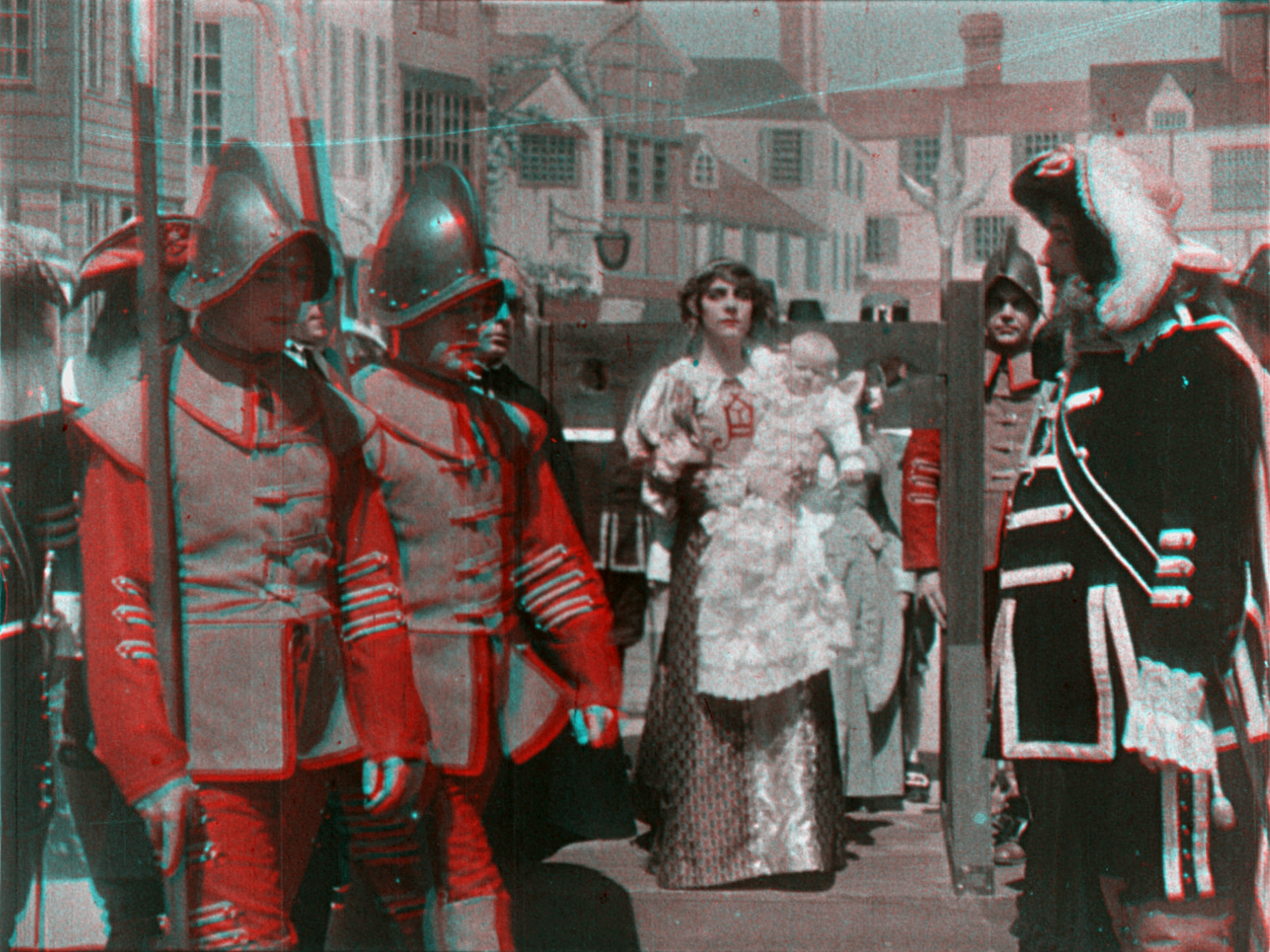
Scene from The Scarlet Letter (1913), featuring Linda Arvidson

=== Decline ===
The Kinemacolor Company of America collaborated with the Natural Color Kinematograph Company on film productions, including The Rivals (1913). However, in early 1914, Charles Urban travelled to America and severed relations between the two companies due to managerial conflict.

In 1914, after a lengthy lawsuit between Charles Urban and a rival inventor, William Friese-Greene, in Britain, the patent for Kinemacolor was declared invalid. With waning public interest for Kinemacolor, the company ceased production in 1915 and was dissolved in 1924. Most films produced by the Kinemacolor Company of America are now considered lost.

William F. Fox, the Kinemacolor Company of America's main researcher, patented an improvement for the Kinemacolor process in 1918.
