= Kinemacolor =

Color motion picture process (1906, 1909–15)

A frame from George Albert Smith's early colour film ''Two Clowns'' (c. 1907)

Kinemacolor was the first commercially successful colour motion picture process. Used commercially from 1909 to 1915, it was invented by George Albert Smith in 1906. It was a two-colour additive colour process, photographing a black-and-white film behind alternating red/orange and blue/green filters and projecting them through red and green filters. It was demonstrated several times in 1908 and first shown to the public in 1909. From 1909 on, the process was known and trademarked as Kinemacolor and was marketed by Charles Urban's Natural Color Kinematograph Company, which sold Kinemacolor licences around the world.

== Process ==
Edward Raymond Turner produced the oldest surviving colour films around 1902. They were made through three-colour alternating-filters. Turner's process, for which Charles Urban had provided financial backing, was adapted by George Albert Smith after Turner's sudden death in 1903 into Kinemacolor. Smith was also influenced by the work of William Norman Lascelles Davidson. He was granted a patent for the Kinemacolor process in 1907.

"How to Make and Operate Moving Pictures" published by Funk & Wagnalls in 1917 notes the following:

Of the many attempts to produce cinematograph pictures... the greatest amount of attention so far has been attracted by a system invented by George Albert Smith, and commercially developed by Charles Urban under the name of "Kinemacolor". In this system (to quote from Cassell's Cyclopædia of Photography, edited by the editor of this present book), only two colour filters are used in taking the negatives and only two in projecting the positives. The camera resembles the ordinary cinematographic camera except that it runs at twice the speed, taking thirty-two images per second instead of sixteen, and it is fitted with a rotating colour filter in addition to the ordinary shutter. This filter is an aluminium skeleton wheel... having four segments, two open ones, G and H; one filled in with red-dyed gelatine, E F; and the fourth containing green-dyed gelatine, A B. The camera is so geared that exposures are made alternately through the red gelatine and the green gelatine. Panchromatic film is used, and the negative is printed from in the ordinary way, and it will be understood that there is no colour in the film itself.

To shoot Kinemacolor films, cameramen had to choose between a variety of red/orange and blue/green filters depending on the subject. Despite this, the films were projected through a single set of red and green filters. Modern research has matched the red projection filter to 25 Sunset Red (with a peak transmission above 610nm) and the green projection filter to 122 Fern Green (with a peak of around 510 to 540 nm). Projected frame rate was also confirmed to be between 30 and 32 frames per second.

Kinemacolor faced several issues, including its inability to reproduce the full color spectrum due to being a two-colour process. Other issues included eye strain and frame parallax because it used a successive frame process, as well as the need for a special projector. The color filters absorbed so much light that studios had to be built open-air.

Developed during a time of growing scientific interest in how people see and perceive color, Kinemacolor was part of early twentieth-century efforts to recreate human vision using additive color processes. Ideas about color perception and visual experience influenced early filmmakers as they tried to make motion pictures appear more realistic.

== Premiere ==
Coronation Drill at Reedham Orphanage (1911)

At the press opening of the Urbanora House in London on 1 May 1908, Charles Urban presented Kinemacolor films which he stated were not taken with the intention to be shown in front of an audience. A second demonstration in England took place once again in the Urbanora House on 23 July 1908, in front of the Lord Mayor of London as well as 60 other guests. Kinemacolor was shown in Paris on 8 July 1908, featuring a film of the Grand Prix motor race taken the previous day. Among the guests were the Lumière brothers, inventors of the autochrome color photography process. George Albert Smith presented Kinemacolor before the Royal Society of Arts on 9 December 1908.

On 26 February 1909, the general public first saw Kinemacolor in a programme at the Palace Theatre in London. By this time, the process was known as Kinemacolor, a suggestion from Arthur Binstead, a journalist at Sporting Life, after Urban offered a £5 prize to anyone who could come up with a name. The programme consisted of 21 films mainly shot around Brighton and the French Riviera.

On 6 July 1909, George Albert Smith presented a programme of 11 Kinemacolor films at Knowsley Hall before King Edward VII and Queen Alexandra. The films included military subjects as well as a party at Knowsley Hall and the King himself. Edward was pleased with the films.

The process was first seen in the United States on 11 December 1909, at an exhibition staged by Smith and Urban at Madison Square Garden in New York City.

== Success and decline ==
In 1909, Urban, who had acquired the Kinemacolor patent from Smith, formed the Natural Color Kinematograph Company, which produced most Kinemacolor films. Urban sold Kinemacolor licences around the world through the Natural Color Kinematograph Company. Outside of the United Kingdom, the only successful Kinemacolor companies were located in Japan and the United States.

Fragment from With Our King and Queen Through India (1912)

The Natural Color Kinematograph Company produced The Funeral of King Edward VII (1910), the first notable Kinemacolor film which proved to be a financial success. That year, the company released the first dramatic film made in the process, By The Order of Napoleon. In 1911, the Scala Theatre became Urban's flagship venue for showing Kinemacolor films, which included From Bud to Blossom (1910), Unveiling of the Queen Victoria Memorial (1911), Coronation of George V (1911), The Investiture of The Prince of Wales (1911). The company also produced the documentary films With Our King and Queen Through India (1912) and the notable recovery of £750,000 worth of gold and silver bullion from the wreck of P&O's SS Oceana in the Strait of Dover (1912). The dramas The World, the Flesh and the Devil (1914), and Little Lord Fauntleroy (1914) were among the last feature films released in Kinemacolor.

Kinemacolor enjoyed the most commercial success in the UK where, between 1909 and 1918, it was shown at more than 250 entertainment venues. Kinemacolor was popular with members of the British royal family. Pope Pius X saw Kinemacolor films in 1913.

The Natural Color Kinematograph Company re-purchased the French rights for Kinemacolor. In 1913, Urban built the Théâtre Edouard VII in Paris for the purpose of showing Kinemacolor, but the process remained commercially unsuccessful in France.

In April 1910, the Kinemacolor Company of America was formed, which initially relied on showing British Kinemacolor films. They filmed The Clansman in 1911, based on the controversial novel of the same name by Thomas Dixon. The film was finished and never released or left unfinished, and inspired D. W. Griffith to produce The Birth of a Nation (1915). The Kinemacolor Company of America produced several narrative and documentary films, such as Making of The Panama Canal (1912) and The Scarlet Letter (1913). The company had studios in Hollywood from 1912 until 1913 and ceased production in 1915.

The Japanese Kinemacolor rights were acquired by the Fukuhōdō film studio in 1910 and were passed on to Toyo Shokai. Emperor Taishō was presented with a three-hour long Kinemacolor programme in August 1913. Two months later, the first Kinemacolor programme was shown in Tokyo. Toyo Shokai reformed itself as Tenkatsu in March 1914 and produced primarily fiction films. With World War I film stock became more expensive, so the company limited production of Kinemacolor films. The last Japanese film produced in Kinemacolor was Saiyûki Zokuhen (1917).

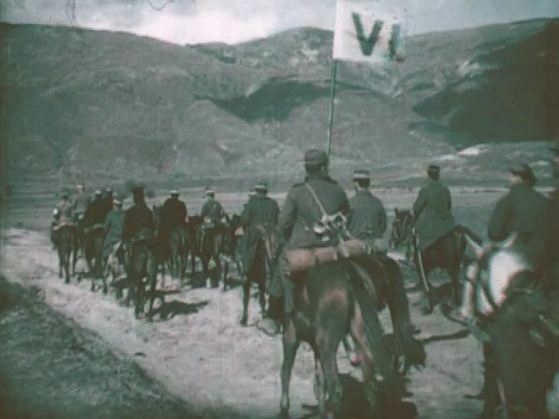
Frame from the Kinemacolor film Balkan War Scenes (1912), filmed by James Scott Brown and Frederic Villiers during the First Balkan War.

In 1913, after years of dispute, William Friese-Greene, inventor of the rival Biocolour system, challenged Smith's Kinemacolor patent at the Royal Courts of Justice. Although the court initially favoured Kinemacolor, the original verdict was overturned in March 1914. Consequently, Kinemacolor lost not only its patent protection but its commercial value and exclusivity.

Urban liquidated the Natural Color Kinematograph Company in order to protect the shareholders. He took the case to the House of Lords and continued the company as Color Films Ltd., which produced the documentary With The Fighting Forces of Europe during World War I. In April 1915, the House of Lords upheld the Court of Appeal's decision and the patent was revoked. Charles Urban filmed the British fleet in Kinemacolor for the documentary film Britain Prepared in late 1915. Most Kinemacolor films are now considered lost.

With his associate Henry W. Joy, Charles Urban continued his research in colour cinematography and developed a process called Kinekrom, an improved version of Kinemacolor. Kinekrom was shown to the public in New York in November 1916. The process was intended to enable Urban to continue showing his vast library of old Kinemacolor films. However, public interest for Kinemacolor had faded and there were few screenings.

The first (additive) version of Prizma Color, developed by William Van Doren Kelley in the U.S. from 1913 to 1917, used some of the same principles as Kinemacolor.

== List of films made in Kinemacolor ==
- The Adopted Child (1911)
- "Advance Styles of Ostrich Plumage" (1911)
- Aldershot Views (1912)
- All's Well That Ends Well (1914)
- Alpes-Maritimes – Cascade de Courmes (1912)
- The Alps (1913)
- An American Invasion (1913)
- The Amorous Doctor (1911)
- Artillery Drill at West Point (1910)
- Atlantic City (1912)
- The Baby (1910)
- A Balkan Episode (1911)
- Band of Queen's Highlanders (1909)
- "Barnyard Pets" (1910)
- "Beads of the World" (1911)
- Big Waves at Brighton (1912)
- "The Birth of a Flower" (1910)
- The Birth of a Nation (1911, uncompleted)
- Biskra and the Sahara Desert (1910)
- The Blackmailer (1911)
- Boys Will Be Boys (1911)
- "Britain Prepared" (1915)
- Brown's German Liver Cure (1911)
- The Bully (1910)
- The Burglar as Father Christmas (1911)
- Burial of the Maine (1912)
- Butterflies (1913)
- By Order of Napoleon (1910)
- By the Side of the Zuyder Zee (1912)
- Caesar's Prisoners (1911)
- Cairo and the Nile (1912)
- The Call of the Blood (1913)
- The Cap of Invisibility (1912)
- Carnival at Nice (1914)
- Carnival in Ceylon (1913)
- Carnival Scenes at Nice and Cannes (1909)
- Cart Horse Parade – May 31 – Regent's Park (1912)
- Castles in the Air (1912)
- Cat Studies (1908)
- Charles Barnold's Dog and Monkey (1912)
- Checkmated (1911)
- "The Chef's Preparations" (1910)
- Children Forming United States Flag at Albany Capitol (1912)
- Children's Battle of Flowers at Nice (1909)
- "Choice Bouquets" (1910)
- Choosing the Wallpaper (1910)
- A Christmas Spirit (1912)
- Church Parade of the 7th Hussars and 16th Lancers (1909)
- A Cingalese Fishing Village in Ceylon (1913)
- A Citizeness of Paris (1911)
- The Clown's Sacrifice (1911)
- Coney Gets the Glad Eye (1913)
- Coney as a Peacemaker (1913)
- Coronation of George V (1911)
- The Coster's Wedding (1910)
- The Crusader (1911)
- Dandy Dick of Bishopsgate (1911)
- "A Day at Henley" (1911)
- A Detachment of Gordon Highlanders (1909)
- Detective Henry and the Paris Apaches (1911)
- A Devoted Friend (1911)
- Dr. Jekyll and Mr. Hyde (1913 British)
- Egypt (1910)
- Elevating an Elephant (1913)
- An Elizabethan Romance (1912)
- Entertaining Auntie (1913)
- Esther: A Biblical Episode (1911)
- The Explorers (1913)
- The Fall of Babylon (1911)
- Farm Yard Friends (1910)
- Fate (1911)
- "Feeding Poultry at Prowse Jones Farm" (1911)
- Fifty Miles from Tombstone (1913)
- The Fisherman's Daughter (1911)
- Floral Fiends (1910)
- The Flower Girl of Florence (1911)
- Following Mother's Footsteps (1911)
- For the Crown (1911)
- "Forces of Europe" (1914)
- "Fording the River" (1910)
- A French Duel (1911)
- "The Freshwater Aquarium" (1911)
- From Bud to Blossom (1910)
- From Factory Girl to Prima Donna (1911)
- The Funeral of Edward VII (1910)
- Galileo (1911)
- A Gambler's Villainy (1912)
- Ganges at Benares (1913)
- "Gems and Jewels" (1911)
- The General's Only Son (1911)
- George V's Visit to Ireland (1911)
- Gerald's Butterfly (1912)
- Girl Worth Having (1913)
- Gladioli (1913)
- Grape vineyards in Piedmont, Italy (1914)
- "The Harvest" (1908)
- Haunted Otter (1913)
- Hiawatha (1913)
- A Highland Lassie (1910)
- The Highlander (1911)
- His Brother's Keeper (1913)
- His Conscience (1911)
- His Last Burglary (1911)
- The House That Jack Built (1913)
- How to Live 100 Years (1913)
- The Hypnotist and the Convict (1911)
- Ice Cutting on the St. Lawrence River (1912)
- In Gollywog Land (1912)
- In the Reign of Terror (1911)
- Inaugurazione del Campanile di San Marco, Venice (1912)
- Incident on Brighton Beach (1909)
- Indiens sur le terrain M. A. A. A. (1910)
- The Inventor's Son (1911)
- The Investiture of the Prince of Wales at Caernarvon (1911)
- Italian Flower and Bead Vendors (1912)
- Italy (1910)
- Jack and the Beanstalk (1912)
- Jane Shore (1911)
- Japan (1913)
- Johnson at the Wedding (1911)
- Julius Caesar's Sandals (1911)
- "Khartoum and his Natives" (1911)
- Kinemacolor Fashion Gazette (1913)
- Kinemacolor Panama Pictures (1913)
- Kinemacolor Photo Plays (1913)
- Kinemacolor Puzzle (1909)
- Kinemacolor Songs (1911)
- The King and Queen on Their Way to Open the Victoria and Albert Museum (1912)
- The King of Indigo (1911)
- Kitty the Dressmaker (1911)
- Lady Beaulay's Necklace (1911)
- Lake Garda Northern Italy (1910)
- Launch of the S.S. Olympic (1912)
- The Letter (1909)
- Liquors and Cigars (1910)
- The Little Daughter's Letter (1911)
- Little Lady Lafayette (1911)
- Little Lord Fauntleroy (1914)
- The Little Picture Producer (1914)
- The Little Wooden Soldier (1912)
- The London Fire Brigade (1910)
- London Zoological Gardens (1910)
- Lost Collar Stud (1914)
- The Lost Ring (1911)
- Love and War in Toyland (1913)
- Love Conquers (1911)
- Love in a Cottage (1911)
- Love of Riches (1911)
- Love Story of Charles II (1911)
- Love's Strategy (1911)
- A Lucky Escape (1911)
- The Lust for Gold (1912)
- Magic Ring (1911)
- The Making of the Panama Canal (1912)
- "Man's Best Friends" (1911)
- The Marble Industry at Carrara Italy (1913)
- "Mephisto" (1912)
- A Merry Monarch (1913)
- The Mighty Dollar (1912)
- The Millionaire's Nephew (1911)
- The Minstrel King (1912)
- Miscellaneous Flowers (1914)
- Mischievous Puck (1911)
- Mission Bells (1913)
- Modelling Extraordinary (1912)
- A Modern Hero (1911)
- The Modern Pygmalion and Galatea (1911)
- Motor and Yacht Boating in England (1910)
- Music Hath Charms (1911)
- Mystic Manipulations (1911)
- A Narrow Escape (1913)
- Nathan Hale (1913)
- Natural Color Portraiture (1909)
- Naval Review at Spithead (1910)
- Nell Gwynn the Orange Girl (1911)
- "New York Autumn Fashions" (1912)
- "Niagara Falls" (1912)
- Nobility (1912)
- A Noble Heart (1911)
- Normal Melbourne (1912)
- Nubia, Wadi Halfa and the Second Cataract (1911)
- Oedipus Rex (1911)
- Ofia, the Woman Spy (1912)
- The Old Guitar (1912)
- The Old Hat (1910)
- Oliver Cromwell (1911)
- Only a Woman (1912)
- Other People's Children (1913)
- "Out Gem of a Cook" (1910)
- Pageant of New Romney, Hythe, and Sandwich (1910)
- Pagsanjan Falls (1911)
- Paris Fashions (1913)
- The Passions of an Egyptian Princess (1911)
- The Peasants and the Fairy (1911)
- Performing Elephants (1913)
- Phil Rees' Stable Lads (1912)
- Picking Strawberries (1910)
- Pisa Italy (1913)
- Pompeii (1912)
- Potomac Falls Virginia (1910)
- The Power of Prayer (1913)
- The Priest's Burden (1911)
- The Princess of Romana (1913)
- The Rabbits-Sheep-Carrots for the Donkey (1909)
- Rambles in Paris (1913)
- Reaping (1909)
- The Rebel's Daughter (1911)
- "Refreshments" (1910)
- Representatives of the British Isles (1909)
- Reptiles (1912)
- Review of Troops by George V (1910)
- Revues des Boy Scouts a Montreal (1910)
- The Richmond Horse Show (1910)
- The Rivals (1913)
- Riviera Coast Scenes (1909)
- Riviera Fisher Folk (1909)
- Robin Hood (1913)
- A Romance of the Canadian Wilds (1910)
- Romani the Brigand (1912)
- Royal Ascot (1912)
- A Run with the Exmoor Staghounds (1912)
- Sailing and Motor Boat Scenes at Southwick (1909)
- Samson and Delilah (1911)
- Santa Claus (1913)
- Saved From the Titanic (1912) (only two scenes were filmed in Kinemacolor)
- The Scarlet Letter (1913)
- Scenes a Montreal comprenant le Gymkhana (1910)
- Scenes in Algeria (1910)
- "Scenes in Cornwall" (1910)
- Scenes on the Mediterranean (1913)
- A Scrap of Paper (1913)
- A Seaside Comedy (1912)
- The Silken Thread (1911)
- Simpkin's Dream of a Holiday (1911)
- Small Game at the Zoo (1912)
- "The Smallest Barque in the World" (1911)
- Soldiers' Pet (1909)
- Spreewald (1913)
- St. John the Baptist (1912)
- Stage Struck (1913)
- Steam (1910)
- "The Story of Napoleon" (1910)
- The Story of the Orange (1913)
- The Story of the Wasp (1914)
- Strange Mounts (1912)
- Suffragette's Parade in Washington, D.C. (1913)
- The Sugar Industry of Jamaica (1913)
- Sunset on the Nile (1913)
- "Sunsets of Egypt" (1912)
- Swank and the Remedy (1911)
- Swans (1909)
- Sweet Flowers (1909)
- Tartans of Scottish Clans (1906)
- Telemachus (1911)
- Three Cape Girls (1912)
- The Tide of Fortune (1912)
- Theodore Roosevelt (1912)
- There Is a God (1913)
- Tobogganing in Switzerland (1913)
- La Tosca (1911) with Lillian Russell based on the play by Victorien Sardou
- A Tragedy of the Olden Times (1911)
- Trilby and Svengali (1911)
- A Trip Up Mount Lowe USA (1913)
- A True Briton (1912)
- Two Can Play at the Same Game (1911)
- The Two Chorus Girls (1911)
- Two Christmas Hampers (1911)
- Two Clowns (1906)
- The Two Rivals (1912)
- Uncle's Picnic (1911)
- The Unveiling of the Queen Victoria Memorial (1911)
- The Vandal Outlaws (1912)
- "Varieties of Sweet Peas" (1911)
- Venice and the Grand Canal (1910)
- The Vicissitudes of a Top Hat (1912)
- View of Brighton Front (1909)
- A Visit to Aldershot (1909)
- A Visit to the Seaside (1908)
- Visite de son Altesse Royale le Duc de Connaught a Montreal (1910)
- Voyage de Liverpool a Vancouver via Montreal (1910)
- Washington's Home and Grounds at Mount Vernon (1910)
- Water Carnival at Villefranche-sur-Mer (1909)
- Waves and Spray (1909)
- William Howard Taft (1912)
- William Tell (1914)
- Winter in Moscow (1913)
- Winter Sports at Are (1913)
- With Our King and Queen Through India (The Durbar at Delhi) (1912)
- "With the Fighting Forces of Europe" (1914)
- The Wizard and the Brigands (1911)
- Woman Draped in Patterned Handkerchiefs (1908)
- The World, the Flesh and the Devil (1914)
- Yoshitsune Senbon Zakura (Japan, 1914)

== See also ==
- List of color film systems
- List of film formats
