= With Our King and Queen Through India =

1912 film

- With Our King and Queen Through India, fragment
- Produced by: Charles Urban
- Cinematography: Joseph De Frenes; Albuin Mariner; Alfred Gosden; Hiram Horton
- Distributed by: Natural Color Kinematograph Company
- Release date: 2 February 1912
- Running time: 150 minutes
- Country: United Kingdom of Great Britain and Ireland
- Languages: Silent; English intertitles

With Our King and Queen Through India (1912) is a British documentary film. The film is silent and made in the Kinemacolor additive color process.

The film records the 12 December 1911 celebrations in India which marked the coronation of George V and Mary of Teck and their proclamation as Emperor and Empress of India. The film is often referred to as The Delhi Durbar or The Durbar at Delhi. Although it is commonly referred to as a single film, it is more accurate to think of it as a set of films documenting the royal visit to India in December 1911, with the Durbar ceremony as the centrepiece. Different showings of With Our King and Queen Through India would be made up of different sets of the films, so that the show (a more accurate concept) was exhibited in several different lengths. Today only two reels survive, one showing a review of troops after the main ceremony and the other a procession in Calcutta from the end of the royal tour.

== Production ==
The film showcased the use of Kinemacolor, which had been launched by Charles Urban in 1908 as the first successful natural colour motion picture process. It was produced by Urban's Natural Color Kinematograph Company and he took five camera operators with him: Joseph De Frenes, Albuin Mariner, Alfred Gosden, Hiram Horton and an unidentified fifth (possibly John Mackenzie).

Charles Urban (centre) and camera team at Delhi in 1911

Frames from lost sequence of With Our King and Queen Through India showing the state entry into Delhi. Kinemacolor films appear black-and-white - the colour effect occurs in projection

British filmmakers had previously filmed the Delhi Durbar marking the coronation of King Edward VII in 1903 (which Edward did not attend).

== Release and reception ==
The films were premiered at the Scala Theatre, London on 2 February 1912, with an accompaniment provided by a live orchestra of forty-eight pieces, a chorus of twenty-four, a twenty-piece fife and drum corps, and three bagpipes. The music echoed that played at the actual ceremonies in Delhi. The stage set featured a mock-up of the Taj Mahal, and there were elaborate lighting effects. Live commentary was provided by the Scala's stage manager St. John Hamund. An article in the American periodical Munsey's Magazine praised the music, describing the band as "one of the best I have heard in London".

The full show was made up of several sections, according to the 1912 Kinemacolor catalogue:

1. Royal Visit to Bombay (2–4 December 1911)
2. Scenes in Delhi, the New Capital of India
3. Arrival of the Ruling Chiefs at Kingsway Station, Delhi
4. Preparing for the Durbar - the Chiefs' Camps
5. The Royal Horse Artillery Firing a Salute
6. Arrival of Their Imperial Majesties at Selimgarh Station
7. Arrival at the Reception Tent, Delhi Fort (7 December 1911)
8. The State Entry into Delhi (7 December 1911)
9. The Royal Procession passing from the Ridge to the King's Camp (Delhi, 7 December 1911)
10. King Edward Memorial Ceremony (Delhi, 8 December 1911)
11. Presentation of Colors (11 December 1911)
12. The Delhi Polo Tournament (7 to 11 December 1911)
13. THE CORONATION DURBAR AT DELHI (12 December 1911)
14. The State Garden Party at Delhi Fort (13 December 1911)
15. The Royal Review of 50,000 Troops (Delhi, 14 December) [film survives]
16. Point to Point Races (Delhi, December, 13th, 1911)
17. State Departure of Their Imperial Majesties (Delhi, 16 December 1911)
18. The King's Camp and the Chiefs' Receptions
19. Preparations for the Calcutta Pageant
20. Arrival and Reception of Their Imperial Majesties at Princep's Ghat Calcutta (30 December 1911)
21. The Pageant Procession [film survives]
22. Their Imperial Majesties' Departure from Calcutta (8 January 1912)

When the film was released, there had been several short black-and-white films of the Delhi Durbar made already by other companies. With Our King and Queen Through India made a huge impact worldwide because of its colour, length and multi-media spectacle. It had a great appeal for middle class audiences that had previously avoided film shows because of their low social status, and it was exhibited before royalty. George V saw it at the Scala on 11 May 1912, accompanied by Queen Mary, Queen Alexandra and Empress Maria of Russia. The Empress wrote to her son Nicholas II of Russia about the show. She attended a lunch with Georgie and May and later watched a Kinemacolor film of their journey to India. She described the Kinemacolor process as a detailed way to view the event, including that it provided a realistic appearance of the footage.

The films were also shown at Buckingham Palace on 12 December 1912.

One of the surviving sequences from the film, The Pageant Procession, has been released on the DVD set Kinemacolor and Other Magic.

== See also ==
- List of early color feature films
- List of incomplete or partially lost films
