= Amnesia (disambiguation) =

Amnesia refers to a variety of conditions in which memory is lost or disturbed.

Amnesia may also refer to:

== Film and television ==
- Amnesia (TV series), a British two-part mini-series
- Amnesia (1994 film), a Chilean film
- Amnèsia, a 2002 Italian film directed by Gabriele Salvatores
- Amnesia (2015 film), a Swiss-French film
- AmnesiA, a 2001 Dutch cult film directed by Martin Koolhoven
- Amnesia (game show), stylized as Amne$ia, a 2008 American quiz show
- "Amnesia" (Code Lyoko), a 2003 television episode
- "Amnesia" (Diagnosis: Murder), a 1993 television episode

== Literature ==
- Amnesia (Cooper novel), a 1992 novel by Douglas Cooper
- Amnesia (Carey novel), a 2014 novel by Peter Carey
- "Amnesia", a 1982 story by Jack Dann

== Comics ==
- "Amnesia" (1997 comic), a comic short story by Al Columbia
- Amnesia: The Lost Films of Francis D. Longfellow, a 2018 comic book by Al Columbia

== Music ==
=== Albums ===
- Amnesia (Hamlet album), 2011
- Amnesia (EP), by Paint It Black, 2009
- Amnesia (Pousette-Dart Band album), or the title song, 1977
- Amnesia (Richard Thompson album), 1988
- Ammnesia, by Mr. Fingers, also known as Larry Heard, 1988

=== Songs ===
- "Amnesia" (5 Seconds of Summer song), 2014
- "Amnesia" (Cherish song), 2008
- "Amnesia" (Chumbawamba song), 1998
- "Amnesia" (Ian Carey song) and Rosette featuring Timbaland and Brasco, 2012
- "Amnesia" (José José song), 1990
- "Amnesia" (KMFDM song), 2012
- "Amnesia" (Roxen song), 2021
- "Amnesia" (Skepta song), 2011
- "Amnesia", by Anahí from Inesperado, 2016
- "Amnesia", by Blue October from Consent to Treatment, 2000
- "Amnesia", by BoyNextDoor from How?, 2024
- "Amnesia", by Britney Spears from Circus, 2008
- "Amnesia", by Cheryl Cole from Messy Little Raindrops, 2010
- "Amnesia", by Dead Can Dance from Anastasis, 2012
- "Amnesia", by Guy Sebastian from Armageddon, 2012
- "Amnesia", by Inspector featuring Rubén Albarrán and Roco Pachukote, 2002
- "Amnesia", by Justin Timberlake from The 20/20 Experience – 2 of 2, 2013
- "Amnesia", by Kim Dotcom, 2012
- "Amnesia", by the Mekons from The Mekons Rock 'n Roll, 1989
- "Amnesia", by Saga, from Worlds Apart, 1981
- "Amnesia", by Shalamar from Heartbreak, 1984
- "Amnesia", by Skinny Puppy from The Process, 1996
- "Amnesia", by Swans from Love of Life, 1992
- "Amnesia", by Toad the Wet Sprocket from Coil, 1997
- "Amnesia", by the Vines from Winning Days, 2004
- "Amnesia", by VIXX, 2023

=== Other uses in music ===
- Amnesia (nightclub), a nightclub in Ibiza, Spain
- Amnesia, a music project of Brad Laner

== Video games ==
- Amnesia (1986 video game), a 1986 text-adventure computer game written by science fiction author Thomas M. Disch
- Amnesia (2011 video game), a 2011 Japanese visual novel for the PlayStation Portable
- Amnesia: The Dark Descent, a 2010 graphic adventure survival horror game
- Amnesia: A Machine for Pigs, a 2013 survival horror game
- Amnesia: Rebirth, a 2020 survival horror game
- Amnesia: The Bunker, a 2023 survival horror game

== See also ==
- Amnesiac (album), a 2001 album by Radiohead
- "Amanaemonesia", a 2011 song by Chairlift on Something
- Amnesiac (film), a 2014 film by Michael Polish
- Amnesiac gene, a Drosophila gene
- Amnezia VPN
- The Amnesic Incognito Live System, a Linux distribution replacing Incognito
- Mnesia, a distributed, soft real-time database management system written in the Erlang programming language
