= Amnesia (1997 comic) =

Comic by Al Columbia

A panel from "Amnesia"

"Amnesia" is an 8-page comic by Al Columbia. It was published in the twentieth issue (September/October 1997) of Zero Zero. Columbia originally created the artwork for a slideshow in a Tales from the Crypt CD-ROM video game being developed by Inscape but turned it into a comic when the game was cancelled.

== Synopsis ==
Columbia's recurring character Seymour Sunshine is shown standing in the middle of a street, looking uncertain and ill at ease. The omniscient narrator introduces him as a victim of amnesia, and comments on his plight as he wanders confusedly through a landscape strewn with entrails and the carcasses of bizarre creatures. Stepping into an unfamiliar house, he responds hesitantly to a knock at the door, which proves to be his companion Knishkebibble the Monkey-Boy. Though he does not recognize him, Seymour follows Knishkebibble on a long overland journey to a fog-shrouded city. They find it inhabited by untold numbers of identical, ghoulish men in suits with wrinkled, scowling faces. At first the men ignore Seymour and Knishkebibble, but when the city's clock tower strikes on the hour their collective facial expression changes to a malevolent grin and they begin to pursue the pair, who run away in fright.

As the two interlopers cower in a hiding place, Seymour's memory is suddenly restored "with intoxicating clarity." He laughs with relief, insisting to Knishkebibble that "Those 'ghouls' are merely FIGMENTS of our own INTELLECT and can cause us no physical harm!" Speaking up loudly, he calls for the attention of his pursuers, proclaims them his "bond-slaves" and proposes that they conquer the world under his command. The men crowd around Seymour and Knishkebibble, still grinning and showing no signs of a change in disposition towards their prey. The final panel shows Seymour surrounded and grimacing as he asks "How'd you like them apples, eh?"

== Analysis ==
"Amnesia" represented another evolution of Columbia's technique. After making striking use of sharp outlines and flat colors in "I Was Killing When Killing Wasn't Cool" and "The Blood-Clot Boy", in "Amnesia" he used a combination of watercolor, acrylic paint, ink, charcoal, and digital tools to create minutely detailed chiaroscuro backgrounds that contrast with the cartoony look of the characters. As Paul Gravett commented: "Al works his flat, outlined Seymour and his pal into what look like soft focussed stills from some vintage black and white animated film. His bigfoot characters scurry about amongst period buildings and backgrounds that are richly textured and photorealist, bathed centre stage in glowing light, but shrouded in threatening shadow in the wings. He bans all speech bubbles and sets his perky text in eye-straining type above the image or in framed boxes." According to Columbia the artwork took him "six months or something like that" to complete.

Although the pictures in "Amnesia" may appear at a glance to be monochrome, it is actually printed in two colors like Columbia's other Zero Zero stories. The anthology's editors noted ruefully that in this case his chosen format "[cost] as much as any two-color process but was invisible to the reader."

Columbia's similarly-titled 2018 comic book Amnesia: The Lost Films of Francis D. Longfellow alludes to the earlier story in passing, presenting it within the book's fictional universe as an animated cartoon by the eponymous director/producer.
