= The Blood-Clot Boy =

A panel from "The Blood-Clot Boy"

"The Blood-Clot Boy" is a 6-page comic by Al Columbia loosely based on the tales of a legendary hero of the same name in Blackfoot folklore. It was published in the sixteenth issue of Zero Zero (April/May 1997).

== Synopsis ==
The wealthy Count and Countess Borovsky give their lovely conjoined twin daughters' hand in marriage, along with their home and fortune, to a visitor who claims to be a distant family relative. Although he offers assurances that he will care for the Count and Countess in their old age, their new son-in-law soon begins to neglect them, and taunts and abuses them with the willing participation of his bride(s). Left to forage for food, the Count secretly observes his son-in-law slaughtering a yak, and steals a large clot of blood from the animal's butchered remains. When he puts the clot into a pot of boiling water to make soup it magically turns into a small boy, who grows to the size of a normal eight-year-old in a single night. After hearing of his stepparents' plight, the Blood-clot boy kills the son-in-law and the twin daughters. Having restored the Count and Countess to their rightful place, he sets out to wander and see the world.

Heading to the nearest town, he finds it is under the control of the goblin-like "Brownshirts", who fly their "peccant, yet strangely attractive banner" in the center of the town. The Blood-clot boy fights the Brownshirts using his unspecified magical powers and kills all but one of them, who he ties up and leaves as an object for public ridicule before continuing on his journey. While crossing a lake he is swallowed by the Windsucker, a giant aquatic beast that disguises itself as a rock. Inside the Windsucker's stomach he finds other people who have been swallowed like him. With their help he kills the Windsucker by burrowing through its brain. After this escape he declares that "This is my business in the world! To kill off all the bad things!"

Next the Blood-clot boy encounters a witch who asks him to wrestle with her. Seeing that the ground where she proposes to wrestle is covered with hidden blades that she would use to kill him, he forces her onto the blades himself, and they cut her body in half. Finally he comes to "the blackest place on earth: the home of the Man-eater." Outside the house, the Blood-clot boy meets a young girl and tells her to perform a ritual that will bring him back to life if he should die in his upcoming encounter. After the Man-eater, who is revealed to be a portly, apple-cheeked old man, kills and devours the Blood-clot boy, the girl successfully revives him; this repeats many times before the Blood-clot boy finally defeats his nemesis. He and the girl end up living happily and having many adventures together.

== Analysis ==
"The Blood-Clot Boy" was the second of Columbia's two color stories to appear in Zero Zero, following "I Was Killing When Killing Wasn't Cool". In contrast to its nearly wordless predecessor, "The Blood-Clot Boy" features an arch, loquacious narrator whose words appear in typeset captions interspersed among the panels, conveying a story Paul Gravett compared to "some nasty Struwelpeter [sic]-style primer to terrify children into good behaviour." Columbia would use a similar format and narrative tone in later works such as "Amnesia" and The Pogostick.
