= Doghead (disambiguation) =

The doghead or cynocephaly phenomenon is a widespread legend involving creatures with human bodies and the heads of dogs.

Doghead may also refer to:

- Doghead (comics), a 1992 comic book by Al Columbia
- Doghead (firearms), a component of matchlock and flintlock guns
- Doghead (novel), a novel by Danish author Morten Ramsland
