= Big Numbers (comics) =

Unfinished graphic novel by Alan Moore and Bill Sienkiewicz

- The cover of the first issue of Big Numbers, art by Bill Sienkiewicz.

Publication information
- Publisher: Mad Love
- Format: Limited series
- Publication date: April – August 1990
- No. of issues: 2 (of 12)
- ISSN: 0957-8692

Creative team
- Written by: Alan Moore
- Artist: Bill Sienkiewicz
- Letterers: Bill Sienkiewicz; Roxanne Starr
- Editors: Debbie Delano; Phyllis Moore

Big Numbers is an unfinished graphic novel by writer Alan Moore and artist Bill Sienkiewicz. In 1990 Moore's short-lived imprint Mad Love published two of the planned twelve issues. The series was picked up by Kevin Eastman's Tundra Publishing, but the completed third issue did not print, and the remaining issues, whose artwork was to be handled by Sienkiewicz's assistant Al Columbia, were never finished.

The work marks a move, on Moore's part, away from genre fiction, in the wake of the success of Watchmen. Moore weaves mathematics (in particular the work of mathematician Benoit Mandelbrot on fractal geometry and chaos theory) into a narrative of socioeconomic changes wrought by an American corporation's building of a shopping mall in a small, traditional English town, and the effects of the economic policies of the Margaret Thatcher administration in the 1980s.

== Publication history ==
The planned 500-page graphic novel was to be serialised one chapter at a time over twelve issues. The series was printed on high-quality paper in an unusual square format.

The first two issues were produced by Alan Moore's self-publishing company Mad Love, with writing by Moore and artwork by Bill Sienkiewicz, but the workload for the comic was intense, and Sienkiewicz stalled. By the time he backed out of the series, the third issue was still incomplete and rising overhead crippled the production. Kevin Eastman, creator of Teenage Mutant Ninja Turtles, stepped in and attempted to have his company Tundra Publishing publish Big Numbers. Moore and Eastman asked Sienkiewicz's assistant, Al Columbia, to become the series' sole artist and Roxanne Starr to be its letterer. Columbia worked on the fourth issue but, for reasons which remain unclear, destroyed his own artwork and abandoned the project as well. Big Numbers #3 and #4 were never published, and the series remains unfinished.

In 1999, ten pages of Sienkiewicz's art for Big Numbers #3 were published in the first (and only) issue of the magazine Submedia. In 2009, a photocopy of the complete lettered art for Big Numbers #3 surfaced on eBay. The purchaser contacted Moore, and with his permission published scans of the art on LiveJournal.

== History ==
Moore announced the series as his popularity was at a peak. The success of Watchmen had made him a star writer. Moore wanted to move away from genre fiction; Big Numbers was to have no genre, and deal with themes of shopping and mathematics.

Mad Love ran into a number of difficulties: the proceeds from AARGH! were donated to defending homosexual rights; the production costs of Big Numbers were high; and Moore's polyamorous relationship with wife Phyllis and their lover Debbie Delano fell apart. Kevin Eastman's Tundra Publishing agreed to publish the rest of the series.

Sienkiewicz's detailed artwork was time-consuming to produce. He hired the 19-year-old Al Columbia as an assistant, but the pressures of the project combined with personal issues led him to quit Big Numbers after the second issue's publication. He drew the entire third issue which never saw print. Sienkiewicz drew every page and figures for all three issues and also did several painted/multimedia covers for upcoming issues that never saw print. Jon J Muth and Dave McKean were among the names rumoured as replacements. Ultimately the job fell to the inexperienced Columbia. Tundra tried to promote Columbia by publishing his first stand-alone comic book, Doghead, in 1992, and put out a Columbia-drawn poster for Big Numbers. The pressure turned out to be too much for the young artist, who is said to have destroyed the artwork for the fourth issue in 1992, and was not heard from again until the publication of The Biologic Show in 1994.

== Plot ==
Set in the fictional English town of Hampton, the book explores the socioeconomic changes brought about by globalisation on an insular community, represented by the building of a shopping mall by a large American corporation. Meanwhile, the community also experiences pressure from prime minister Margaret Thatcher's economic policies, including cuts to health care and welfare.

== Style and analysis ==
Each page is laid out in a rigid twelve-panel grid. The all-white speech balloons are circular, rather than the more common oval shape.

== Adaptations ==
In a 2001 interview Moore indicated that he did not believe Big Numbers could ever be completed as comics, but he spoke of the possibility of the comic being adapted as a television series by Picture Palace Productions, as he had the whole story mapped out on a sheet of A1 paper, and five episodes written.

An account of the unravelling of the Big Numbers project is included in Eddie Campbell's 2001 graphic novel Alec: How to Be an Artist.

The fan-produced graphic novel "Giant-Size '63", a follow-up to Moore's other uncompleted series 1963, features a story where superhero Hypernaut teams up with "Constance Newcastle," an analogue/stand-in for Big Numbers' protagonist Christine Gathercole. The story was written by comics scholar Douglas Wolk.

== Reception ==
The first issue sold 65,000 copies, the second 40,000.
