= Amnesia (Ian Carey song) =

Single by Ian Carey and Rosette featuring Timbaland and Brasco
- Released: January 23, 2012
- Recorded: 2011
- Genre: House
- Label: Spinnin' Records

Ian Carey singles chronology
"Last Night" (2011)	"Amnesia" (2012)

"Amnesia" is a song by American house DJ Ian Carey and Rosette featuring Timbaland and Brasco. It was released in January 2012 as a single, reaching number 34 in Canada. It was certified Gold in Canada in 2013.

== Track listing ==
Digital single

1. "Amnesia" (Club Mix) – 4:46
2. "Amnesia" (Extended Mix) – 4:33
3. "Amnesia" (Cazzette Another Sugar Hunt Mix) – 5:00
4. "Amnesia" (Firebeatz Remix) – 7:03
5. "Amnesia" (Ziggy Stardust Remix) – 6:00
6. "Amnesia" (Ralph Good & Chris Gant Remix) – 5:56
7. "Amnesia" (Yves V Remix) – 6:24

== Charts ==
Chart (2012)	Peak position
Belgium (Ultratip Bubbling Under Flanders)	59
Canada Hot 100 (Billboard)	34
France (SNEP)	113
Netherlands (Single Top 100)	72

== Certifications ==
On February 22, 2013, the song was certified Gold in Canada.

Region	Certification	Certified units/sales
Canada (Music Canada)	Platinum	80,000^{*}
^{*} Sales figures based on certification alone.
