= Hollow Press =

Independent publisher

Hollow Press is an independent Italian publishing house, specialized in alternative and experimental comics.

Created by Michele Nitri in 2015, it stands out for the dark fantasy and macabre style of its published titles and for the funding method, aimed at the resale of the original plates, all previously purchased by Nitri himself.

== History ==
Hollow Press debuts in the publishing scene in April 2014, when the founder Michele Nitri produces the first volume of U.D.W.F.G., a collection of five serialized stories of five different artists. At the end of October the second volume comes out, with which are launched the action figures of the monstrous protagonists of the stories, sculpted by Marco Navas.

At the beginning of February 2015 Hollow Press was officially born, that then published a special dedicated to Shintaro Kago (Industrial Revolution and World War ) and a "best of" of Tetsunori Tawaraya (Tetsupendium Tawarapedia).

The August of the same year the third U.D.W.F.G. was out, while in September a 688 pages story named Largemouths from Gabriel Delmas got published. Later, in October, at the Irregular Rhythm Asylum gallery of Tokyo, Hollow Press presents an exhibition in which Shintaro Kago and Testunori Tawaraya participate, while at the end of the month the house participates at the Lucca Comics & Games, with Paolo Massagli and Gabriel Delmas as special guests.

In November, the house published the first comics of the Lucca born Paolo Massagli Toxic Psycho Killer.

In January 2016, the work of Arallū The Dim Reverberation of the Chaosholder gets published. In May Tetsunori Tawaraya Crystal Bone Drive and Gabriel Delmas Fobo is printed.

To celebrate the publishing of Shintaro Kago Tract, an exposition was then organized at the Toronto Comics Art Festival.

== Characteristics ==
Hollow Press is specialized in contemporary dark fantasy publications, as well as the direct sale of the original table whence the comics are produced; the whole happens exclusively in comic exhibitions or from the official internet page. In this way, also favored by social networks and from publishing mainly in English, the company tapped a little but important international market (without having to depend from intermediaries) creating a compact and clear identity.

This business method, explains Michele Nitri in an interview, results from the malfunction of the distribution systems, only effective for large productions. The publishing house is more independent, and gives the opportunity to foreigners to buy their products without excessive charges. In fact, even if Hollow Press was founded in Italy, 70% of sales come from foreign buyers.

== Volumes ==
=== U.D.W.F.G. (Under Dark Weird Fantasy Grounds) ===
U.D.W.F.G is a semestral fanzine. The volume is composed of five bizarre serialized stories:

- Cretin Keep on Creepin’ Creek by Mat Brinkman
- The Emanation Machine by Miguel Ángel Martín
- The High Bridge by Tetsunori Tawaraya
- Five Mantles by Ratigher
- Hell by Paolo Massagli

The stories are independent from each other but they share both the obscure and indecipherable aspect and the presence of fanciful and grotesque creatures.

The chaotic and alienating aspect is taken care of in a meticulous way, and the most common narrative aspects of graphic novels are omitted. More importance is given to the visual effect and the reading rhythm instead, with more concentrated images, filled with details. The aim is not to deliver a message, but rather to trigger strong and new experiences, also with the aid of special drawing techniques and coloration: exclusively black and white.

=== The Dim Reverberation of the Chaosholder ===
Sperimental work of the mysterious author Arallū, The Dim Reverberation of the Chaosholder is presented by the author as a "dungeon crawler comic", first volume of the entire half-yearly series that will be composed of eight volumes. Arallū introduces us so:

Give up any illusions and consciously be entropic containers.

I'm not recounting to answer your questions but to let you exist in an anomalous aesthetic the contents that are yours since forever.

Their space-time, instead, does not belong to you...

Strongly videogame culture influenced, it develops in first person and in a similar way as roleplaying games; the protagonist/reader (as the "Obsidian Golem") have to face claustrophobic undergrounds, and to explore the obscure and alienating universe, solving small puzzles, while escorted by N'Tar, a monster forced to accompany and show him the way by a mysterious entity, that works as sole narrator.

The book is published in English, but is distributed with Italian and Japanese translations attached.

=== Industrial Revolution and World War ===
Industrial Revolution and World War is a special Shintaro Kago's volume printed in 2015. Set in a post-apocalyptic world, it's about the evolution of a civilization of small anthropomorphic creatures that develop their own technology thanks to the finds of human bodies, that are used as building materials for war machinery and tools.

In September of the same year it gets reprinted, so as to obtain a total of 500 existing copies.

=== Largemouths ===
Largemouths is a large sized graphic poetry (688 pages), inspired by the famous painting Saturn devorando a hijo by Francisco Goya. The story is a silent visual journey into a world composed of Largemouths (huge titans) that walk and struggle with each other regardless, and mythical creatures, that huddle and come together, creating the first forms of expression, while human civilization is still in its infancy.

=== Tetsupendium Tawarapedia ===
Tetsupendium Tawarapedia is an anthology of 400 pages composed of the works by Tetsunori Tawaraya between 2002 and 2012. In general, it's a collection of psychedelic stories formed by a series of alternate realities, where the characters and settings broke and recomposed throughout the entirety of the narrative process.

== Authors ==
- Arallū
- Mat Brinkman
- Paolo Bacilieri
- Al Columbia
- Gabriel Delmas
- Shintaro Kago
- Miguel Ángel Martín
- Paolo Massagli
- Ratigher
- Tetsunori Tawaraya

== Publications ==
- U.D.W.F.G. (Under Dark Weird Fantasy Grounds), 2014–2015
- U.D.W.F.G. presents SHINTARO KAGO – Industrial Revolution and World War, 2015
- Tetsupendium Tawarapedia, 2015
- Largemouths, 2015
- Toxic Psycho Killer, 2015
- The Dim Reverberation of the Chaosholder, 2016
- Crystal Bone Drive, 2016
- Fobo, 2016
- Tract, 2016
- The Biologic Show, 2020
