= Al Columbia =

American artist

- Born: Alfred Columbia; 1970 (age 55–56)
- Areas: Cartoonist, Writer, Artist, Inker, Colourist
- Pseudonyms: Lucien; Jack Lazy; Orange Sunshine; Francis D. Longfellow
- Notable works: The Biologic Show "I Was Killing When Killing Wasn't Cool" "The Blood-Clot Boy" "Amnesia" "The Trumpets They Play!"; The Pogostick "5:45 A.M."; Pim & Francie: The Golden Bear Days; Amnesia: The Lost Films of Francis D. Longfellow
- Collaborators: Ethan Persoff

Al Columbia (born 1970) is an American artist known for his horror and black humor-themed alternative comics. His published works include the comic book series The Biologic Show, the graphic novel/art book Pim & Francie: The Golden Bear Days, and short stories such as "I Was Killing When Killing Wasn't Cool" and "The Trumpets They Play!". He also works in other media including painting, illustration, printmaking, photography, music, and film.

== Career ==
=== Big Numbers ===
At the age of 18 Columbia was hired to assist Bill Sienkiewicz in illustrating Alan Moore's ambitious Big Numbers series. When Sienkiewicz withdrew from the series in 1990 after the release of the first two issues, Moore and his backers at Tundra Publishing asked Columbia to become its sole artist. In 1992, Columbia left the project after accusations that he had destroyed his own artwork for Big Numbers #4. Columbia declined to address the subject publicly for several years, writing in a 1998 letter to The Comics Journal that "I could easily launch into a tirade about the extensive horror of my Tundra experience, but I much prefer the very entertaining and conflicting accounts already in circulation." In later statements he confirmed that he destroyed his artwork for the series but disputed additional claims by the other principal figures in the fiasco.

In a 2011 article reflecting on his Big Numbers experience, Sienkiewicz wrote that he and Columbia had long since reconciled over the matter, and that he was content to "[c]halk the feud up to the folly of youth."

=== 1990s ===
Columbia's first published works appeared in the horror anthology From Beyonde in 1991, initially under the pseudonym "Lucien" and then under his real name. Tundra sponsored the publication of his first solo comic book, the slight but lavishly produced Doghead, in 1992. In 1993 the British magazine Deadline published his stories "The Biologic Show" and "Tar Frogs: A Pim and Francie Adventure".

In 1994 Fantagraphics Books published Columbia's comic The Biologic Show #0, which contained revised versions of the two Deadline pieces along with new stories in a similar vein. It received reviews and praise from other cartoonists including Mike Allred and Jim Woodring. The Biologic Show #1 followed in 1995, featuring the first part of a never-continued Pim and Francie serial, Peloria; an issue #2 was advertised but never appeared. Also in 1995, "I Was Killing When Killing Wasn't Cool" became the first of a series of two color short stories by Columbia to appear in the Fantagraphics anthology Zero Zero. In these works he adopted a streamlined drawing style evocative of early animated cartoons, particularly the works of Fleischer Studios. In later stories such as "Amnesia" (1997) and "Alfred the Great" (1999) Columbia combined these stylized character drawings with minutely detailed chiaroscuro backgrounds created using mixed media (including watercolor, acrylic paint, ink, and charcoal) and digital tools. "The Trumpets They Play!", a widely lauded work in this style based on the Book of Revelation, appeared in BLAB! #10 in 1998. In addition to his own creations, Columbia did color separations for the publications of other cartoonists including Chris Ware (Acme Novelty Library), Archer Prewitt (Sof' Boy and Friends), and Catherine Doherty (Can of Worms).

Although Columbia gave occasional interviews during this period, the small quantity of his published output and the cancellation of several titles and anthology contributions, compounded with lingering questions about the fate of Big Numbers, made him an object of much speculation. "Whatever happened to Al Columbia?" was such a perennial question on The Comics Journal's online message board that it eventually became an in-joke referenced in later press coverage.

=== 2000s ===
Columbia's career was punctuated by several prominent appearances in non-comics media, including set designs for David Cross's 1999 comedy special The Pride is Back, a post-9/11 illustration for the New York Times Letters page, and, in 2003, artwork for The Postal Service's platinum-selling album Give Up. In the comics realm, following a pair of covers for Zero Zero's final issue (#27, August 2000) and a small handful of pieces for other anthologies, his artwork stopped appearing in print for several years after 2002. He contributed solely as a writer to 2003's The Pogostick, a series about a mentally disturbed office worker illustrated by Ethan Persoff. The Pogostick earned a Harvey Award nomination for Best New Series but was left unfinished after two issues. A personal website, alcolumbia.com, appeared the same year with a "Coming Soon" sign but lay dormant for several years. It eventually emerged in 2006 as a Flash-based site hosting a shifting assortment of ephemeral content including artwork, photographs, music, and videos, along with numerous teasers for works that would remain unreleased, unfinished, or possibly nonexistent.

Columbia returned to a degree of public visibility in 2007 with an exhibition of original artwork at Portland, Oregon's Floating World Comics, an interview on Robin McConnell's Inkstuds radio show, and the first of six appearances in the comics quarterly Mome. Between 2008 and 2010 he produced a pair of short-lived comic strips for the Alvin Buenaventura-edited comics pages of the magazines Arthur and The Believer.

In 2009 Fantagraphics released Columbia's most expansive work to date: Pim & Francie: The Golden Bear Days, a 240-page assemblage of fragmentary comics and illustrations drawn over a period of more than ten years. It received widespread critical acclaim and earned him two Ignatz Award nominations. His Mome short story "5:45 A.M." was also featured in the 2009 edition of The Best American Comics.

=== 2010–present ===
Columbia continued to contribute short pieces for publication through the 2010s, mostly to small press anthologies. His original drawings and paintings appeared for sale in online marketplaces, along with limited edition prints issued by various commercial partners. Some of this non-comics work saw publication in the pages of the contemporary art magazine Hi-Fructose and on its website.

In 2018 Columbia returned with Amnesia: The Lost Films of Francis D. Longfellow, a collection of posters for the imaginary cartoons of a fictional Golden Age animation studio.

Alcolumbia.com closed in early 2012 and was replaced the following year by orangesunshinehouse.com, featuring a similar mixture of Flash-based content. In 2017 the site moved to a new domain, orangesunshinemedicine.com, before disappearing in 2019. In July 2021 Columbia launched an Instagram account featuring his artwork and photographs.

In 2020 Hollow Press published a hardcover collection of The Biologic Show, reproducing both issues of the out-of-print comic along with a pair of related early works, in English and Italian language editions. Paris-based comics publisher Huber Éditions released a French language version of Pim & Francie: The Golden Bear Days in 2021.

== Recurring characters ==
From The Biologic Show onwards Columbia's comics have featured several recurring characters who continue to reappear despite having been killed multiple times.

- Seymour Sunshine: A frequent protagonist in Columbia's early work, Seymour Sunshine is a timid, passive manchild who resembles Koko the Clown. He first appeared in the story "No Tomorrow If I Must Return" in The Biologic Show #0. Other stories featuring the character include "I Was Killing When Killing Wasn't Cool", "Amnesia", and "The Trumpets They Play!".
- Pim and Francie: A pair of impish waifs whose antics get them into horrific trouble, Pim and Francie first appeared in the story "Tar Frogs" and are the protagonists in "Peloria Part One" and Pim & Francie: The Golden Bear Days. The two have a loosely defined friend/lover/sibling relationship. According to Columbia they were originally modeled on him and his former girlfriend as cartoon characters before taking on a life of their own.
- Knishkebibble the Monkey-Boy: Described in the story "Amnesia" as a "childish icon for mischievous and filthy pleasures," Knishkebibble was introduced in "Peloria Part One". In later appearances he acted as Seymour Sunshine's sidekick, serving mostly to drag both of them into dangerous situations. He is greedy, conniving, and vulgar, and usually speaks with a hillbilly accent.

== Music and film ==
In the 1990s Columbia was a founding member of the band The Action Suits, whose other members included fellow Fantagraphics cartoonists Peter Bagge and Eric Reynolds. Although he did not play on any of the band's recordings, he created the artwork for their 7-inch vinyl single "Glazed Donuts", released in 1997. Columbia's own musical recordings with various collaborators have appeared sporadically on his websites and on streaming platforms including YouTube and Vimeo; none have been released commercially. He has also directed short films and music videos, including one in 2009 for the song "These Wounds Never Heal" by the American heavy metal band Unholy.

Columbia's story "5:45 A.M." provided the basis for a scene in director Santiago Menghini's 2014 short film Intruders, which was screened at various North American venues including the Toronto International Film Festival.

== Influence ==
Gerard Way, author of The Umbrella Academy and lead singer of the band My Chemical Romance, described his exposure to Columbia's work as "a turning point" in the development of his own sensibility. Other artists and musicians who have cited Columbia as an inspiration include Tunde Adebimpe of TV on the Radio, Camille Rose Garcia, Dwid Hellion of Integrity, Frances Bean Cobain, and Esao Andrews.

In a 2009 interview with Juxtapoz magazine's Evan Pricco, illustrator Aaron Horkey asserted that "countless successful artists continue to pillage [Columbia's] back catalog, propping up their half-baked careers on the well-worn spines of second hand copies of Biologic Show."

== Solo comics and books ==
- Doghead (1992, Tundra Publishing)
- 23 Skidoo, minicomic (1994, Wow Cool (Berkeley, CA))
- The Biologic Show #0 (October 1994, Fantagraphics Books)
- The Biologic Show #1 (January 1995, Fantagraphics Books)
- Pim & Francie: The Golden Bear Days (2009, Fantagraphics Books); also published in a French translation (Huber Éditions (Paris), 2021)
- Amnesia: The Lost Films of Francis D. Longfellow (2018, PO Press/Floating World (Portland, OR))
- The Biologic Show (2020, Hollow Press); a collected edition containing issues #0 and #1 of The Biologic Show, material from 23 Skidoo, and the 1992 short story "Johnny 23", released in English and Italian language versions

== Comics with Ethan Persoff ==
- Writing, The Pogostick #1 (February 2003, Fantagraphics Books); artwork by Ethan Persoff
- Writing, The Pogostick #2 (December 2003, Fantagraphics Books); artwork by Ethan Persoff
