= Cages (comics) =

Comic book limited series by Dave McKean

- Cages (1998) by Dave McKean

Publication information
- Publisher: Tundra Publishing; Kitchen Sink Press
- Schedule: Irregular
- Format: Limited series
- Genre: Fantasy
- Publication date: December 1990 – May 1996
- No. of issues: 10

Creative team
- Created by: Dave McKean
- Written by: Dave McKean
- Penciller(s): Dave McKean; Clare Haythornthwaite
- Inker(s): Dave McKean
- Letterer(s): Dave McKean
- Colorist(s): Dave McKean

Collected editions
- Hardcover: ISBN 0-87816-600-9
- Softcover: ISBN 1595823166

Cages is a ten-issue comic book limited series by Dave McKean. It was published between 1990 and 1996, and later collected as a single volume.

Cages is a story about artists, belief, creativity and cats, illustrated in a stripped-down pen and ink style.

== Publication history ==
The first seven issues of the series were published by American publisher Tundra (December 1990 - June 1993) and the last three by Kitchen Sink (August 1993 - May 1996).

== Collected editions ==
Tundra collected the first three issues into one trade paperback in June 1991 (ISBN). Cages was eventually completely collected as a 500-page hardcover volume by Kitchen Sink Press in 1998 (ISBN 0878166009), and in a new edition by NBM Publishing in 2002 (ISBN 1561633194). Dark Horse Comics published a softcover edition in July 2009 (ISBN 1595823166) and a hardcover in October 2010 (ISBN 1595823166).

== Awards ==
Cages won two Harvey Awards, for "Best New Series" in 1992, when it was also nominated for "Special Award For Excellence In Presentation" and "Best Artist", and "Best Graphic Album of Previously Published Work" in 1999.

It was also nominated for the "Best Finite Series" Eisner Award in 1993 and in the same year McKean was nominated for the "Best Cover Artist" Eisner Award for this work on Cages and Sandman.

== Film ==
McKean revealed, via his Twitter account, that he has been in talks concerning adapting Cages into an animated film.
