= Ian Carey =

American DJ and music producer (1975–2021)

- Also known as: Ian "45" Carey, Illicit Funk, The Ian Carey Project
- Born: Ian Joseph Harshman; September 13, 1975
- Origin: Hancock, Maryland, U.S.
- Died: August 20, 2021 (aged 45)
- Genres: House, electro
- Occupations: Disc jockey, musician, record producer
- Instruments: Bass guitar, keyboards, drums, guitar
- Years active: 1993–2021
- Labels: Elan, GFAB, Vicious

Ian Joseph Harshman (September 13, 1975 – August 20, 2021), better known by his stage name Ian Carey, was an American house DJ, musician, and record producer based in Miami, Florida.

== Biography ==
Carey grew up in Hancock, Maryland, graduating from Hancock Middle-Senior High School in 1993. His father was a live sound engineer and ran a sound reinforcement company; he had engineered for such groups as Kool & The Gang and The Duke Ellington Orchestra.

Carey became involved with dance music while in college. He had already experimented with the graffiti-writing scene in Baltimore, where he met a number of hip-hop DJs, which led to him becoming involved in DJing. He was also introduced to house music while working at a record store. The success of Carey's first self-produced single "Rise" later influenced him to move to Europe to pursue a career in dance music production.

Carey performed as a disc jockey since 1993 and worked as a record producer since 1998. Working with Jason Papillon (see DJ Jason Brooks) as part of Soul Providers, their first single, "Rise", peaked within the top 60 of the charts in the United Kingdom.

Suffering from depression, and unhappy with the house music scene in America, Carey moved to the Netherlands from the US in 2003 and then on to Spain in 2006. In 2008, Ian Carey released the song "Get Shaky" (released as The Ian Carey Project), which featured the vocals of American singer-songwriter Kelly Barnes, who also co-wrote the song. "Get Shaky" peaked within the top ten of the charts in Australia, Belgium, New Zealand, and the United Kingdom. In the former country, "Get Shaky" peaked at number two on the ARIA Singles Chart in January 2009, while in the latter country, "Get Shaky" became Carey's second charting song on the UK Singles Chart and first top ten hit on the listing, peaking at number nine in August 2009. The song achieved Double Platinum certification in Australia and Gold certification in New Zealand. The song also won the award for Best Dance Video at the MTV Australia Awards 2009. It also reached the top ten and was world champion Czech Republic's official goal song at the IIHF Ice Hockey World Cup in Germany. In 2011 Ian collaborated with Snoop Dogg and Bobby Anthony on his single "Last Night" which was also remixed by Afrojack.

Ian was based in Miami but spent much of the year touring internationally. On August 20, 2021, Carey died from unknown causes at the age of 45.

== Discography ==
=== As lead artist ===
Title	Year	Peak chart positions											Certifications	Album
Title	Year	AUS	AUT	BEL	CAN	FRA	GER	IRE	NDL	NZ	SWI	UK	Certifications	Album
"The Mobtown Sound"	2002	—	—	—	—	—	—	—	—	—	—	—		Non-album singles
"It's Alright / Party Time"	2003	—	—	—	—	—	—	—	—	—	—	—		Non-album singles
"Non-Stop"	2004	—	—	—	—	—	—	—	—	—	—	—		Non-album singles
"Drop Da Vibe" (with DJ Jani featuring MC Gee)	2004	—	—	—	—	—	—	—	—	—	—	—		Non-album singles
"Prince Uptown"	2005	—	—	—	—	—	—	—	—	—	—	—		Non-album singles
"Give Up the Funk"	2005	—	—	—	—	—	—	—	—	—	—	—		Non-album singles
"The Power"	2005	—	—	—	—	—	—	—	—	—	—	103		Non-album singles
"Say What You Want" (with Mochico featuring Miss Bunty)	2005	—	—	—	—	—	—	—	96	—	—	—		Non-album singles
"Lose Control"	2006	—	—	—	—	—	—	—	—	—	—	—		Non-album singles
"Tonight" (with Mad Mark)	2007	—	—	—	—	—	—	—	—	—	—	—		Non-album singles
"Keep on Rising" (featuring Michelle Shellers)	2007	—	—	—	—	—	—	—	16	—	—	—		Non-album singles
"Love Won't Wait"	2007	—	—	—	—	—	—	—	—	—	—	—		Non-album singles
"Get Shaky"	2008	2	33	57	—	—	46	9	54	7	59	9	AUS: 2× Platinum; NZ: Gold; UK: Platinum	Non-album singles
"Redlight"	2008	—	—	—	—	—	—	—	28	—	—	—		Non-album singles
"SOS"	2009	—	—	—	—	—	—	—	—	—	—	—		Non-album singles
"Shot Caller"	2009	61	—	—	—	—	—	—	—	—	—	—		Non-album singles
"Let Loose" (featuring Mandy Ventrice)	2010	—	—	—	—	—	—	—	—	—	—	—		Non-album singles
"Hoodrat Stuff"	2010	—	—	—	—	—	—	—	—	—	—	—		Non-album singles
"Last Night" (featuring Snoop Dogg and Bobby Anthony)	2011	15	—	—	24	—	—	—	77	—	—	—	AUS: Platinum; CAN: Gold	Non-album singles
"Amnesia" (with Rosette featuring Timbaland and Brasco)	2012	60	—	109	34	113	—	—	72	—	—	—	CAN: Gold	Non-album singles
"Lights Out" (with Mobin Master)	2012	—	—	—	—	—	—	—	—	—	—	—		Non-album singles
"Baddest Chick" (with Doron featuring Ray J and Kardinal Offishall)	2013	—	—	—	—	—	—	—	—	—	—	—		Non-album singles
"Keep on Rising" (with Fedde Le Grand)	2017	—	—	—	—	—	—	—	—	—	—	—		Non-album singles
"—" denotes a title that did not chart, or was not released in that territory.

== Awards ==
MTV Music Video Awards Australia

- 2009 Best Dance Video – "Get Shaky"
