= Amnesia: The Lost Films of Francis D. Longfellow =

Publication information
- Publisher: PO Press/Floating World
- Format: Ongoing series
- Genre: Alternative, horror
- Publication date: 2018
- No. of issues: 1

Creative team
- Written by: Al Columbia
- Artist(s): Al Columbia
- Editor(s): Al Columbia

Amnesia: The Lost Films of Francis D. Longfellow Supplementary Newsletter No. 1 is a 2018 comic book by Al Columbia. Printed in an oversize 11" x 13" format, it is a 24-page collection of posters allegedly created for animated cartoons by the (fictional) titular director/producer and his company, Podsnap Studios. Some of the "lost films" feature Columbia's recurring protagonists Seymour Sunshine and Knishkebibble the Monkey-Boy, who are depicted here as cartoon characters performed by voice actors. The posters also contain references to earlier Columbia stories such as "The Trumpets They Play!" and "I Was Killing When Killing Wasn't Cool", presenting them as Longfellow's creations and tying them into Amnesia's fictional universe.

Published by Portland, Oregon's Floating World Comics (in association with Columbia's own PO Press) accompanied by a fictional backstory and a blurb from Art Spiegelman, Amnesia was well received by critics, who praised both the artwork and its conceptual underpinnings. Matt Seneca wrote in The Comics Journal that it "spotlights a cartoonist who has identified exactly what's most powerful about his own work building himself an elaborate metafictional theater to project it in." Heidi MacDonald compared it favorably to Seth's It's a Good Life, If You Don't Weaken and Sonny Liew's The Art of Charlie Chan Hock Chye as "an elaborately invented body of work for an imagined creator." In a conference presentation at William Peace University later published in book form, Chadwick Crawford considered Amnesia's metafictional conceit as a further development of ideas explored in Columbia's previous book, 2009's Pim & Francie: The Golden Bear Days. The Guardian included it in a 2019 overview of the best comics of the decade.

== Contents ==
- Baby Dead Bird
- Death to the Sunday Family
- Weirdo Psycho Jolly Boys in Happyland
- Tip-Toe Throo the Hatchet Chamber
- Sweet Meats
- Baby Fangs
- Skinless Slim
- Puggy the Pup in "Revenge of the Black Angel Gang"
- 13 Shady Lane
- Vinegar Tom
- Wünderland
- Hollywood Boulevard
- Vampire Ball
- Feast of the Oligarchs
- Hail Satan
- The Ballad of Monte Wibbit
- The Gentle Giant
- The Revenge of Auggie Jones
- The Nine Kings
- Grand Slam
- Funeral Follies
