= The Familiar (film) =

- Directed by: Kody Zimmermann
- Written by: Kody Zimmermann
- Produced by: Riley Walsh
- Starring: Torrance Coombs; Paul Hubbard; Rachel Sehl; Brock Shoveller; Art Kitching; Jason Harder; Luisa Jojic; Josh Blacker
- Cinematography: George Campbell
- Edited by: Kody Zimmermann
- Music by: Richard L. King
- Release date: October 17, 2009 (Screamfest)
- Running time: 22 minutes
- Country: Canada
- Language: English

The Familiar is a 2009 comedy horror short film starring Torrance Coombs, Paul Hubbard and Rachel Sehl. It tells the story of a naive vampire fan who becomes the personal assistant to a belligerent vampire. It won awards at the Sitges Film Festival, Bram Stoker International Film Festival, Charleston International Film Festival, the Rincon International Film Festival, the Seattle True Independent Film Festival and the River Bend Film Festival. It has been nominated for several Leo Awards as well as Best Short Film at the DGC Awards.

== Plot ==
Sam (Torrance Coombs) has always been obsessed with vampires from the time he was a child watching them on children's programs to when he was a college student reading horror novels on the side. On Sam's 21st birthday, a mysterious gentleman offers him a peculiar career choice: become an assistant to a real-life Vampire. Intrigued and enthusiastic, Sam takes the job and meets Simón Bolívar (Paul Hubbard), a 400-year-old Vampire. Everything about the Vampire does hold some truth to it; a truth followed by a dose of hard-reality. Sam soon realizes that it is not so cool or pleasant to serve his corrupt and neurotic behavior.

== Cast ==
- Torrance Coombs as Sam Matheson
- Paul Hubbard as Simón Bolivar
- Rachel Sehl as Alice
- Brock Shoveller as The Old Gentleman
- Jason Harder as Thomas Holland
- Luisa Jojic as Penny
- Suzka Mares as The Vampire's Escort
- Josh Blacker as Virgil
- Art Kitching as Nosferatu/The Jogger
- Rosette Sharma as The Vampire's Call Girl

== Inspiration ==
Kody Zimmermann came up with the idea reading Dracula while working as an actor's assistant: "I felt like...the vampire was a metaphor for the boss from hell. I was always interested in the Renfield character in Dracula, and no one ever really did his story – that I know of. What kind of a person would devote himself to this sinister, Satanic agent and still call himself a human being? I thought that was the connection – you are crazy for being part of this world, but you are not exactly the main character, either. I wanted to bridge those two things, and I think it fit well while I was writing it: serving this greater being while being caught up in this insanity. A lot of us go into these jobs where we ask ourselves, 'why are we doing this'".

== Awards ==
=== Wins ===
- 2010: HorrorQuest Film Festival for Best Short Film
- 2010: Sitges Film Festival Official Fantastic Competition Panorama for Best Short Film
- 2010: Vampire Film Festival for Outstanding Vampire Short
- 2010: Buffalo Screams Horror Film Festival for Best Horror Short Film
- 2010: Buffalo Screams Horror Film Festival for Best Screenplay
- 2010: Mile High Horror Film Festival Audience Award for Best Short Film
- 2010: Thriller! Chiller! Film Festival Best Short Film
- 2010: Bram Stoker International Film Festival for Best Short Film
- 2010: Maelstrom International Fantasy Film Festival for Audience Favorite Best Horror Short Film
- 2010: Action/Cut Short Film Competition for Best Fiction Film
- 2010: Seattle's True Independent Film Festival (STIFF) Fangbanger Award
- 2010: River Bend International Film Festival Hight Point Award
- 2010: Rincón International Film Festival for Best Horror Short
- 2010: Charleston International Film Festival for Best Short Thriller

=== Nominations ===
- 2011: Killer Film Festival for Best Screenplay (Kody Zimmermann)
- 2011: New Orleans Horror Film Festival for Best Screenplay (Kody Zimmermann)
- 2011: New Orleans Horror Film Festival for Best Horror Short
- 2010: Buffalo Screams Horror Film Festival for Best Director (Kody Zimmermann)
- 2010: Buffalo Screams Horror Film Festival for Best Cinematography (George Campbell)
- 2010: Buffalo Screams Horror Film Festival for Best Actor (Torrance Coombs)
- 2010: Buffalo Screams Horror Film Festival for Best Actor (Paul Hubbard)
- 2010: Terror Film Festival for Best Horror Short Film
- 2010: Action On Film International Film Festival for Best Make-Up
- 2010: Directors Guild of Canada Award for Best Short Film
- 2010: Leo Award for Best Screenplay in a Short Drama (Kody Zimmermann)
- 2010: Leo Award for Best Overall Sound in a Short Drama (Hugo Dela Cerda, Kevin Belen, David Green)
- 2010: Leo Award for Best Sound Editing in a Short Drama (Kelly Cole, Bill Mellow, Kevin Belen, Graeme Hughes, David Green)
- 2010: Leo Award for Best Performance Male Lead in a Short Drama (Torrance Coombs)
