= Get Shaky =

2008 single by the Ian Carey Project

- Australian CD single cover

Single by the Ian Carey Project
- Released: October 25, 2008
- Genre: House; Dance
- Length: 2:58 (radio edit)
- Label: Vicious (Australia), 3 Beat Blue (UK), Spinnin' Records (Holland)
- Songwriters: Kelly R Barnes, Ian Harshman, Alexander Rousmaniere
- Producer: Ian Carey

Ian Carey singles chronology
"Redlight" (2008)	"Get Shaky" (2008)	"Shot Caller" (2009)

"Get Shaky" is a song by American DJ and producer Ian Carey. It was first released as a commercial radio track in Australia by Vicious Recordings who made it peak at number two on the ARIA Singles Chart. It then went on peak within the top ten of the charts in Belgium, New Zealand, and the United Kingdom, and the goal song of world champions Czech Republic at the 2010 Ice Hockey World Championships in Germany. The song features on Clubland 16 and also on Clubland: Smashed. The female voice is American singer-songwriter Kelly Barnes, who also co-wrote the song.

== Track listing ==
Australian CD single

1. "Get Shaky" (radio edit) – 2:58
2. "Get Shaky" (Ian Carey Original vs Alternative Remix) – 6:02
3. "Get Shaky" (Vandalism Remix)
4. "Get Shaky" (Stonebridge Remix)

== Charts ==
=== Weekly charts ===
Chart (2008–2010)	Peak position
Australia (ARIA)	2
Austria (Ö3 Austria Top 40)	33
Belgium (Ultratip Bubbling Under Flanders)	7
Germany (GfK)	46
Ireland (IRMA)	9
Netherlands (Dutch Top 40)	13
Netherlands (Single Top 100)	54
New Zealand (Recorded Music NZ)	7
Russia Airplay (TopHit)	86
Scottish Singles Sales (Official Charts)	10
Switzerland (Schweizer Hitparade)	59
UK Singles (Official Charts)	9

=== Year-end charts ===
Chart (2008)	Position
Australia (ARIA)	81

Chart (2009)	Position
Australia (ARIA)	27
Netherlands (Dutch Top 40)	61
UK Singles (OCC)	97

=== Decade-end charts ===
Chart (2000–2009)	Position
Australia (ARIA)	54

== Certifications ==
Region	Certification	Certified units/sales
Australia (ARIA)	2× Platinum	140,000^{^}
New Zealand (RMNZ)	Platinum	30,000^{‡}
United Kingdom (BPI)	Platinum	600,000^{‡}
^{^} Shipments figures based on certification alone.^{‡} Sales+streaming figures based on certification alone.
