= Redlight (song) =

Single by Ian Carey
- Released: July 28, 2008
- Recorded: 2007
- Genre: House; Dance
- Length: 2:54
- Label: GFAB Records Spinnin' Records Ultra Music
- Songwriter(s): Ian Harshman, Jenny Karr, Alexander Rousmaniere

Ian Carey singles chronology
"Love Won't Wait" (2007)	"Redlight" (2008)	"Get Shaky" (2008)

"Redlight" is a song released by American DJ and producer Ian Carey.

== Track listing ==
CD single

1. Redlight (Radio edit)
2. Redlight (Bingoplayers remix)
3. Redlight (Franky Rizardo remix)
4. Redlight (Original Mix)

== Charts ==
=== Weekly charts ===
Weekly chart performance for "Redlight"
Chart (2008–2009)	Peak position
Netherlands (Dutch Top 40)	36
Netherlands (Single Top 100)	28
Russia Airplay (TopHit)	2

=== Year-end charts ===
Year-end chart performance for "Redlight"
Chart (2009)	Position
Russia Airplay (TopHit)	26

=== Decade-end charts ===
Decade-end chart performance for "Redlight"
Chart (2000–2009)	Position
Russia Airplay (TopHit)	98
