= Tundra Publishing =

Defunct American comic book publishing company

- Founded: July 1990
- Founders: Kevin Eastman
- Defunct: 1993
- Headquarters location: Northampton, Massachusetts
- Publication types: Comics, graphic novels
- Fiction genres: Horror, humor, adventure, thrillers, science fiction
- Imprints: King Hell

Tundra Publishing was a Northampton, Massachusetts-based comic book publisher founded by Kevin Eastman in 1990. The company was founded to provide a venue for adventurous, creator-owned work by talented cartoonists and illustrators. Its publications were noted in the trade for their high production values, including glossy paper stock, full-color printing, and square binding. Tundra was one of the earlier creator-owned companies, before the formation of Image Comics and Dark Horse Comics' Legends imprint.

Creators and projects involved with Tundra included Alan Moore and Bill Sienkiewicz's Big Numbers, Moore & Eddie Campbell's From Hell, Moore & Melinda Gebbie's Lost Girls (these last two original serialised in Stephen R. Bissette's Taboo anthology, which was also part-published by Tundra), The Crow, Mike Allred's Madman and Dave McKean's Cages.

Despite its ambitious start, Tundra never became a profitable enterprise. It closed its doors in 1993 after burning through $14 million in three years. Kitchen Sink Press acquired its holdings; it reprinted popular Tundra publications such as Understanding Comics and continued to publish some Tundra series such as Taboo.

== History ==
While co-managing Mirage Studios, Eastman and his partner Peter Laird often spoke of the difficulties in maintaining creative control of their work. Eastman decided to address this problem by using his own personal knowledge and connections to help other creators. With Laird's blessing, Eastman started Tundra Publishing in 1990, to realize personal and other projects.

Rick Veitch has written that:

One of the plans was for Tundra to act as an exoskeleton for an existing self-publisher; offering marketing muscle, higher production values, printing costs paid and a page rate up front for half the action no strings attached.

Moreover, as Eastman said in a 2007 interview with Benjamin Ong Pang Kean, Tundra provided a forum for Marvel and DC creators to work on projects that they could not otherwise realize:

Basically, I'd meet them at conventions and they'd said they're stuck doing Spider-Man, they had a wife and a kid at home, and they had to make ends meet. But if they really had a chance, they said they'd really do this [at Tundra] and I'd hear this repeatedly. So, I went back to those artists because I had the money and said I'd give them the chance. I asked them what they'd like to do. They could pick their dream projects that they'd wanna do and I would provide the funding so that they could survive and they didn't have to do Spider-Man for a year and I'll fund the projects and I just wanted to make my money back from the profits to keep my company going.

As part of Eastman's designs for Tundra were to produce personal projects of an adult nature, this saw Tundra fitting in the dubious middle-ground, as their intended product sat somewhat awkwardly between the comic shop and the book shop. Eastman says that he originally "thought that the audience was a lot larger than it actually was," citing his personal assumption that readers would "grow up through X-Men and discover The Sandman and then Dark Knight and Watchmen and beyond." The relatively new inroads of comics and graphic novels into bookshops worked against Tundra at the time. Tundra dealt in new properties, which required "building from the ground up," and was "a lot more work" than Eastman had anticipated, growing far too quickly for comfort, and requiring considerable injections of time and money, rather than being profitable. Tundra received multiple award nominations during its first and second years, including Harvey Awards and Eisner Awards, but despite critical acclaim the company was not making money on its titles.

Speaking in 1992/93, Eastman was optimistic that the company had "finally reached the point where [it had] slowed up enough . . . to be giving individual projects the time and attention they require[d]." Shortly thereafter, in the spring of 1993, Tundra was bought out by Kitchen Sink Press, closing its (solo) doors after just three years, losing Eastman between $9 and $14 million.

== Titles published ==
Notable works released by Tundra include:

- Cages by Dave McKean, issues #1–7 (Dec. 1990 – June 1993) – issues #8–10 (Aug. 1993 – May 1996) published by Kitchen Sink Press
- Cobalt 60 by Mark Bodé and Larry Todd (1992) – continuation of Vaughn Bodé's series from the 1960s
- ComicsTrips: A Journal of Travels through Africa and Southeast Asia by Peter Kuper (1992)
- Doghead by Al Columbia (1992) – Columbia's first solo comic book
- Graffiti Kitchen by Eddie Campbell (1993)
- Hyena a humor magazine edited by Mark Martin
- The Jam: Urban Adventure by Bernie Mireault (Jan.–May 1992)
- Madman Adventures by Mike Allred (1992–1993)
- The Maximortal by Rick Veitch (1992–1993) – published under his own King Hell imprint
- Rain by Rolf Stark and Marlene Stevens (1993–1994)
- Taboo, edited by Steve Bissette – horror anthology where portions of Alan Moore's From Hell (with Eddie Campbell) and Lost Girls (with Melinda Gebbie), as well as Neil Gaiman's unfinished Sweeney Todd (with Michael Zulli), were first serialized; Tundra also released the first From Hell collections
- Tantalizing Stories by Mark Martin and Jim Woodring (Oct. 1992 – July 1993) – children's comic where most of Woodring's early Frank stories appeared
- Trailer Trash by Roy Tompkins (1992–1993)
- Understanding Comics by Scott McCloud (1993)

Tundra had been prepared to take over publication of Alan Moore's troubled Big Numbers series (originally self-published by Moore) before it was aborted.

== Tundra UK ==
In 1991 a British arm of the company, Tundra UK, opened in London. Led by Dave Elliott, an editor at Deadline and a founder of Atomeka Press, the UK branch worked with creators already on board with Tundra in the US as well as developing new projects. Tundra UK published comics from 1992–1993; titles they published included:

- The Bogie Man by John Wagner & Alan Grant and Robin Smith (1992–1993)
- Greenhouse Warriors by Glenn Dakin and Phil Elliott (1992)
- Lazarus Churchyard by Warren Ellis and D'Israeli (1992)
- Skidmarks by Ed Hillyer (1992)
- Skin by Peter Milligan and Brendan McCarthy (1992)
- Strange Embrace by David Hine (1993) – collected and colored in 2007–2008 by Image Comics
- White Trash by Gordon Rennie and Martin Emond (1992)

A number of projects were originally slated to be published by Tundra UK but ended up with other publishers after Tundra's demise. These include:

- Hotwire by Steve Pugh and Warren Ellis — eventually published beginning in 2010 by Dave Elliott for Radical Comics
- Kingdom of the Wicked by Ian Edginton and D'Israeli — published by Caliber Comics in black-and-white in 1996–1997 and then in color in 2004 by Dark Horse
- Mister Monster: Worlds War Two by Michael T. Gilbert — published by Dave Elliott for Penthouse Comix and again at Atomeka Press in 2004
- Pale Horses by Dan Abnett, Steve White and Gary Erskine — published in 1997 by Dark Horse Comics as Hypersonic
