= Ethan Persoff =

American cartoonist, archivist, and sound artist

- Born: November 22, 1974 (age 52) Denver, Colorado
- Areas: Cartoonist, Writer, Artist
- Notable works: Teddy, The Pogostick

Ethan Persoff (born November 24, 1974, in Denver, Colorado) is an American cartoonist, archivist, and sound artist. His work as an archivist includes a complete digitization of Paul Krassner's counterculture magazine The Realist, and the website Comics with Problems, which has been featured on multiple segments of The Rachel Maddow Show. As a comics artist, he has been published by Fantagraphics, and received media attention for his website projects, including two projects with artist and co-collaborator Scott Marshall; a downloadable Halloween mask based on Senator Larry Craig and a Tijuana Bible based on George W. Bush and John McCain. His late granduncle was Nehemiah Persoff.

== Projects ==
The Larry Craig Halloween Mask, a downloadable paper mask designed to be fit over a paper bag, received widespread media attention, including Air America, CBS News, and the Washington papers Politico and Roll Call. Other satires on Persoff's website include an entire cosmetic line of Sarah Palin lipstick, and an audio piece of an angered Mitt Romney supporter blended with orchestral music that went quickly viral on the Internet until being forced offline.

From 2009 through 2011, Persoff served as art director for Barney Rosset's Evergreen Review. While working for the magazine, he also contributed two pieces of writing, a profile of the beat poet recording project Paris Records and a report on George W Bush's first post-presidential appearance as a motivational speaker, entitled "A Day Spent In Hell." In 2016, a coffee table book collection of the best comics from The Realist titled The Realist Cartoons was published by Fantagraphics. It was co-edited by Persoff and Paul Krassner and received two Eisner Award nominations: Best Archival Project and Best Publication Design.

From 2013 through 2020, Persoff completed a comics biography with Scott Marshall of underground journalist John Wilcock. The strip was serialized on the website Boing Boing, and was recognized by Print, The New Yorker and New York magazines. It was included in The Best American Comics, 2017, edited by Ben Katchor. A completed collection of the John Wilcock comics was published in 2021.

Since 2019, Persoff has produced a podcast entitled Spoken Word with Electronics. The show is serialized on the culture website Boing Boing.

== Archival work ==
Persoff's website is recognized for its archive of scanned files of rare and unusual comics. The available titles on the site vary from the mundane, such as travel comics and educational booklets, to the disturbing, including comics that focus on drug use and racism. Socially conscious work is included as well, including a scan of the 1957 comic book Martin Luther King and the Montgomery Story. In 2006, Persoff acquired an original copy of the comic (indicating only a handful of copies were then known to exist), scanned it, and posted it on his blog for Martin Luther King, Jr. Day. In 2008, Persoff reported that the Cairo director of the American Islamic Congress (AIC) had translated the scanned comic into Arabic and Persian. The AIC's HAMSA (Hands Across the Mideast Support Alliance) initiative printed 2,500 copies of the translated comic, distributing them throughout Algeria, Bahrain, Iraq, Kuwait, Lebanon, Morocco, Saudi Arabia, Tunisia, and Yemen. When the Egyptian Revolution of 2011 broke out, U.S. Representative John Lewis spoke on MSNBC, stating "over 200,000 copies have been translated into Arabic and distributed through Egypt," and credited the mass-distribution of the 50-year-old comic as a contributing element in the Egyptian protests. Persoff mentioned the scanning and uploading of the document, and its subsequent role as source images for a peace campaign, to be "a good story about the value of putting things online, waiting 5-10 years, and seeing where they end up."

== Notable works ==
=== Comics ===
- Teddy, webcomic (2001)
- The Pogostick (with Al Columbia), published by Fantagraphics (2003)
- The Adventures of Fuller Bush Man & John McCain, in "Obliging Lady", self-published (2008) - Tijuana Bible
- John Wilcock, New York Years, 1954–1971 (with Scott Marshall), serialized on Boing Boing (2013–2020) - Collected as a print collection in 2021
- Radio Wire, online comic (2013-2016)
- The Bureau, online comic and music project (2018–present)

=== Journalism ===
- "Ladies and Gentlemen, Paris Records - Conversations with Michael Minzer and Hal Willner," Evergreen Review (October 2009)
- "A Day Spent in Hell - Getting Motivated at Bush's First Public Appearance as Motivational Speaker," Evergreen Review (December 2009)
- "Skin So Thin, It's Inside Out" - Interview with Paul Krassner on Donald Trump - The American Bystander (May 2017)

=== Music ===
- Save This For Later, It's Not Music: Chicago, 1993-1997
- Snap! (2001)
- SPREE: An Escape From Reality (2005)
- Live at Harry's Loft (2010)
- The Bureau (2018)

=== Podcast ===
- Spoken Word with Electronics (2020–present)

=== Archival projects ===
- Comics with Problems (2005-2020)
- The Realist Archive Project (2007-2010)
