= Floating World Comics =

Comic book retailer in Portland, Oregon

- Type: Private
- Industry: Retail, Publishing
- Founded: July 2006; 20 years ago
- Headquarters: Lloyd Center, Portland, Oregon, United States
- Number of locations: 1
- Products: Comic books, graphic novels
- Owner: Jason Leivian
- Divisions: Gravy Toys
- Website: floatingworldcomics.com

Floating World Comics is a comic book retailer and publisher located in Portland, Oregon, United States. Owned by Jason Leivian, the company specializes in alternative and independent comics, "showcasing auteur creators and the artists pushing the boundaries of 2-D sequential works."

== History ==
Floating World Comics opened in July 2006, located in a "modest ActivSpace... under the I-405 freeway." It soon moved to the corner of NW 4th and Couch in Portland's Old Town Chinatown neighborhood.

The company expanded into publishing in 2011. In 2013, Floating World took over as publisher of Arthur magazine, helping to relaunch the publication. (Arthur folded again the following year.)

In February 2015, Floating World Comics became part of a distribution cooperative—managed by Alternative Comics—along with the small publishers Hic and Hoc Publications, Revival House Press, Study Group Comics, Hang Dai Editions, and Steve Lafler/Manx Media. Dubbed the Alternative Comics Publishing Co-Op, the publishers agreed to have their titles listed in distribution catalogs under the Alternative Comics banner, thus giving the publishers access to distribution from Diamond Comic Distributors and Consortium Book Sales and Distribution.

In 2022, Floating World Comics moved to the Lloyd Center shopping mall. As of 2024, the company's titles "are distributed to the direct market through Diamond Comic Distributors and to the trade market through Consortium Book Sales." Following the Lloyd Center's closure in 2026, the business is slated to relocate to Pioneer Place.

== Exhibitions ==
Over the years, Floating World Comics held experimental animation nights, art festivals, and exhibitions of cartoonists' work, including Al Columbia (2007), "Spacenight: A Tribute to Bill Mantlo" (2007), new comics from Croatia and Serbia (2008), "Spacenight2: A Tribute to Bill Mantlo" (2010), and eBoy (2013).

== Publications (selected) ==
=== Ongoing and limited series ===
- All Time Comics Zerosis Deathscape (7 issues, 2019-2020), by Josh Bayer, Josh Simmons, Trevor Von Eeden, et al — superhero pastiche
- Black Phoenix (3 issues, 2023-2024), by Rich Tommaso
- Hyperthick (3 issues, 2021–2022), by Steve Aylett
- Night Hunters (4 issues, 2020–2021), by Alexis Ziritt and Dave Baker
- Unsmooth (2 issues, 2019–2021), by E. S. Glenn
- Slasher (5 issues, 2017–2018), by Charles Forsman — co-published with Alternative Comics

=== Graphic novels and one-shots ===
- After Land (2016), by Chris Taylor — nominated for the Doug Wright Award Pigskin Peters Award
- Algernon Blackwood's The Willows (2017?), by Nathan Carson and Sam Ford
- Amnesia: The Lost Films of Francis D. Longfellow (2018), by Al Columbia — co-published with Colubmia's own PO Press
- Ariadne Auf Naxos (2013), by Julia Gfrörer
- Boat Life (2022), by Tadao Tsuge
- The Coward's Hole (2016), by Tyler Landry — co-published with Study Group Comics
- Cowboys and Insects (2016), by David Hine and Shaky Kane — first published digitally by Aces Weekly
- Diamond Comics #6 (2011), by Paul Pope
- Floodgate Companion (2016), by Robert Beatty (ISBN 9781942801986 OCLC 1033512652)
- The Immersion Program (2019), by Léo Quievreux — translated version of a series originally published in French
- Island Of Memory vol. 1 (2013), by T. Edward Bak
- Lonesome (2016), by Tyler Landry — co-published with Study Group
- Object 10 (2013), by Kilian Eng
- Wild Man vol. 1: Island of Memory: The Natural History of Georg Wilhelm Steller (2013), by T. Edward Bak (ISBN 978-0-9886624-4-5)

=== Anthologies ===
- St. Owl's Bay (2013) — broadsheet newspaper
- Performance (2017) — broadsheet newspaper

==== Free Comic Book Day mini-comic anthologies ====
- 2012 Brad Trip – co-published with Teenage Dinosaur, Revival House, and Sparkplug Comics
- 2013 Master P's Theater – co-published with Sparkplug Comics, Snakebomb Comix, and Teenage Dinosaur
- 2014 Barrio Mothers – co-published with Sparkplug Comics, Snakebomb Comix, and Teenage Dinosaur
- 2015 Free Stooges – co-published with Sparkplug Comics, Snakebomb Comix, and Teenage Dinosaur
