= The Biologic Show =

Comic book series by Al Columbia

- Cover of The Biologic Show #0

Publication information
- Publisher: Fantagraphics Books
- Format: Ongoing series
- Genre: Alternative, horror
- Publication date: October 1994 – January 1995
- No. of issues: 2

Creative team
- Written by: Al Columbia
- Artist: Al Columbia
- Editor: Kim Thompson

Cover of The Biologic Show #1

The Biologic Show is a comic book series written and drawn by Al Columbia. The first issue, #0, was released in October 1994 by Fantagraphics Books, and a second issue, #1, was released the following January. A third issue (#2) was announced in the pages of other Fantagraphics publications and solicited in Previews but was never published. "I Was Killing When Killing Wasn't Cool", a color short story with a markedly different art style originally intended for issue #2, appeared instead in the anthology Zero Zero. In a 2010 interview, Columbia recalled that the unfinished issue "looked so different that it just didn't look right, it didn't look consistent, and it didn't feel right to keep putting out that same comic book, to try to tell a story where the style is mutating." The series' title is taken from a passage in the William S. Burroughs book Exterminator! (in the story "Short Trip Home"). The passage in question is quoted briefly in a story from issue #0, itself also titled "The Biologic Show".

Each issue of The Biologic Show contains several short stories and illustrated poems. Many of the pieces deal with disturbing subject matter such as mutilation, incest, and the occult. Issue #0 introduces three of Columbia's recurring characters: the hapless, Koko the Clown-like Seymour Sunshine in the opening story "No Tomorrow If I Must Return", and the sibling duo Pim and Francie in "Tar Frogs". (Both "Tar Frogs" and the aforementioned "The Biologic Show" had originally appeared in the British comics magazine Deadline but were partially redrawn for Columbia's solo book.) Issue #1 is dominated by the 16-page Pim and Francie story "Peloria: Part One", intended as the start of an ongoing serial. It includes another character, Knishkebibble the Monkey-Boy, who reappears in Columbia's later work. Upon the demise of The Biologic Show Fantagraphics announced that Peloria would be released as a stand-alone graphic novel, but this plan was also abandoned.

== Reception ==
Reaction to The Biologic Show upon its release was mixed. One of the few contemporaneous reviews of issue #0 in the comics press dismissed it as "an array of senselessness. Themes are inane or non-existent and none seem to progress any sense of story." However, the series was highly praised by other alternative comics creators including Mike Allred and Jim Woodring, who wrote that "[i]t's full of stuff you don't want to think about too much, but it's so much fun to look at that you can't help but linger. [Columbia] does tricks with time and revelations that are shockingly deft." A 1998 profile of Columbia in The Comics Journal called issue #0 "a big, visceral, and messy masterwork which shouted his arrival to the ranks of cartoonists-to-watch" and described issue #1 as "even better: focused and more cohesive, with a longer, more meaningful story begun for Columbia's best characters." Writing in 2002, Kieron Gillen characterized the series as "comics transgression in its purest form."

In the years since its publication The Biologic Show has been noted for its influence on other cartoonists and artists. Tunde Adebimpe of TV on the Radio has described the series as a specific inspiration for multiple songs and a general influence on his music's structure and pacing. Singer and comic book writer Gerard Way spoke about the series in a 2009 segment for the G4 web show Fresh Ink Online, calling issue #0 "the most important comic to me in my collection" and singling out the story "Li'l Saint Anthony" for praise. He also told an interviewer that his own work changed dramatically after he was exposed to the series. In 2011 Frances Bean Cobain was photographed with a tattoo of Columbia's Seymour Sunshine character taken from issue #1.

== Collected edition ==
In October of 2020, Italian comics publisher Hollow Press released a collected edition containing both issues of The Biologic Show, pages from Columbia's 1994 minicomic 23 Skidoo, and "Johnny 23", a 1992 short story originally published in the horror comics anthology Taboo. They also published an Italian language version.

== Contents ==
=== Issue #0 ===
- No Tomorrow If I Must Return Starring Seymour Sunshine
- The Biologic Show [listed as "Self-Titled Instructional Version" in the issue's table of contents]
- Grinding Larry
- Over
- Extinction
- The Low-Born Peacock
- Li'l Saint Anthony
- Bruja
- Tar Frogs: A Pim and Francie Adventure

=== Issue #1 ===
- Squiggly Things
- Peloria: Part One (A Pim and Francie Adventure)
- Seymour Sunshine Debris
  - Slow Machine
  - Castigian
  - The Hellbound Bellydancer
- Ersatz (A Family Name)
