= Rosette Sharma =

Canadian singer-songwriter

Rosette
- Born: Rosette Sharma; New Westminster, British Columbia, Canada
- Genres: Pop, electronic, dance-pop
- Occupations: Singer, songwriter
- Years active: 2002–2013
- Labels: Shred Records, Ultra Records
- Website: rosetteofficial.com

Rosette Sharma (1982), also known by her stage names Rosette, Rosette Luve, Rozette, and Rosetta, is a Canadian singer and songwriter

== Early life ==
Sharma was born in British Columbia. She is of Indo-Fijian descent. She graduated from Riverside Secondary School in Port Coquitlam in 1999.

== Career ==
In 2004, she placed seventh in the Canadian edition of Popstars. In 2005, Rosette released her first album Uh Oh on Shred Records. Its lead single "Crushed" topped the CanCon Top 40 chart for four weeks. Rosette's most successful single to-date has been "Amnesia" which was released in 2012. It became a top 40 hit in Canada and the Netherlands and was certified Gold in Canada. In 2013, Sharma co-wrote "Til It's Gone" on Britney Spears' album Britney Jean. In 2012, she was signed to Ultra Records.

== Discography ==
=== Albums ===
- Uh Oh (2005)

=== As lead artist ===
- 2005: "Crushed"
- 2006: "Uh-Oh"
- 2009: "Ditzy Girl"
- 2013: "I Wanna Fly" (featuring Kardinal Offishall)
- 2015: "Sweetest Mistake"
- 2015: "Rain"

=== As featured artist ===
Year	Single	Peak chart positions						Certifications
Year	Single	CAN	NLD	GER	AUT	FRA	BEL	Certifications
2011	"Fire" (Sunloverz featuring Rosette)	53	—	—	—	—	—	
2011	"Rio de Janeiro" (Michael Mind featuring Rosette)	—	—	56	—	98	—	
2012	"Amnesia" (Ian Carey with Rosette featuring Timbaland and Brasco)	34	31	60	—	—	—	MC: Gold
2012	"Ready for Tonight" (Dimaro featuring Rosette and Carlprit)	—	—	—	—	—	19	

=== Other appearances ===
- 2011: "We've Only Just Begun" (Dimaro featuring Rosette and Carlprit)
- 2012: "Bits 'N Pieces" (Dim Chris featuring Craig David and Rosette)
- 2013: "Partied All the Night" (Mischa Daniels featuring Rosette and Craig Smart)
- 2015: "No Place Like Home" (Blasterjaxx featuring Rosette)

== Filmography ==
Year	Title	Role	Note
2005	Reefer Madness	Female Dancer	TV movie
2005	The L Word	Wedding Guest	TV series
2006	Godiva's	Red Top Girl	TV series
2006	49th & Main	Puja Grewal	TV series
2008	Under One Roof	Kisha	TV series
2009	Psych	Raini	TV series
2009	The Familiar	Call Girl	Short Film
