= Doghead (comics) =

- Creator: Al Columbia
- Date: 1992
- Page count: 48 pages
- Publisher: Tundra Publishing

Doghead is a 48-page graphic novel by Al Columbia. His first solo publication, it was released by Tundra Publishing in 1992 while he was involved with Alan Moore's ill-fated Big Numbers series. It contains two short stories in black and white (the Pixies-inspired "Broken Face" and "Patio Lanterns") and one ("Poster Child") painted in full color.

Doghead's reception was lukewarm. A 1995 review by Vincent Aliberti dismissed it as "Dave McKean and Bill Sienkiewicz impersonations, some fine colour work and an occasional exchange of witty dialogue", and Marshall Pryor in The Comics Journal called it "forgettable, but lovely, work [...] most notable for its experimentation with disturbing single images and animation-style movement, strengths of [Columbia's] later comics." Writing in 2002, Paul Gravett allowed that Doghead was "indebted" to Sienkiewicz and McKean but saw "hints of [Columbia's] emerging singular identity" in it as well. Columbia told an interviewer in 1992 that "OK, it's derivative... I suppose in Doghead I felt obligated to do some crowd pleasing. I felt obligated to do something impressive... I felt I had to show people: 'Look, I can do this'. Maybe that was a mistake, but it was the most honest thing I could do. I make no apologies for my influences. I mean, I'm only twenty-one." (Contrary to this avowal, the last page of Doghead includes Columbia's "apologies" to some of his early sources of inspiration, including Black Francis, Nick Cave, William S. Burroughs, David Lynch, Franz Kafka, and J. G. Ballard.)

== Contents ==
- "Broken Face"
- "Patio Lanterns"
- "Poster Child"
