= The Trumpets They Play! =

Seymour and Knishkebibble flee from the Beast of Armageddon in "The Trumpets They Play!"

"The Trumpets They Play!" is an 8-page comic by Al Columbia. A cartoon interpretation of the Book of Revelation featuring his recurring characters Seymour Sunshine and Knishkebibble the Monkey-Boy, it was published in BLAB! #10 in 1998. Its artwork took Columbia six months to complete. The title was taken from a song by his former roommate and Action Suits bandmate Andy Schmidt.

== Synopsis ==
After a title card introducing the upcoming feature as "Seymour Sunshine and Knishkebibble the Monkey-Boy's Big Budget Fiasco", the story begins with a televangelist reading aloud passages from the Book of Revelation describing the seven seals and seven trumpets, accompanied by topical illustrations. The preacher's broadcast is interrupted by a newsflash on the impending end of the millennium. The panel view gradually zooms out slowly from the TV screen to the interior of a high-rise apartment, then out of a window to reveal a panorama of debauchery and random violence. In the background, the meteorite Wormwood flies across the sky.

Meanwhile, Knishkebibble is shown in another apartment reading the Book of Revelation. He decides to take a bath to ward off "pre-millennium jitters". While he is drawing his bath the meteorite strikes the earth, causing all the faucets to spew inky black liquid. He runs out of the bathroom and awakens his sleeping companion, Seymour. They answer a knock at the door and are confronted by a pair of giant, armored locusts. Escaping the apartment, they scramble across rooftops, leap into a conveniently placed roadster, and drive away in haste.

The city is being ravaged by a massive earthquake and an army of grinning creatures carrying long knives. As Seymour and Knishkebibble speed out of the collapsing metropolis, a colossal seven-headed Beast looms in the distance. An army marching under the Beast's flag captures the pair; Knishkebibble kisses the boots of an officer and denounces Seymour, who is dragged away. The Beast is shown seated on a throne towering over a Nuremberg-style rally of men giving the Nazi salute; Knishkebibble and the televangelist are among the throng. In the Beast's hand, a pocketwatch labeled "Years of the Christian Era" approaches 2000. On the outskirts of the city, where mass executions by gun and guillotine are underway, Seymour sits with his limbs tied up and a lit stick of dynamite balanced on his head.

In the final page – the only one in full color – Seymour is shown in a white dress suit and hat, frolicking in a bucolic but strangely empty paradise.

== Critical reception ==
"The Trumpets They Play!" has been cited by critics as an outstanding work, both within Columbia's own output and within the comics medium generally. In a 2002 essay on Columbia, Paul Gravett called it his "most alarming output yet [...] a cartoon apocalypse, a black and white Fleischer Brothers animated film as designed by Hieronymus Bosch." The 2011 book 1001 Comics You Must Read Before You Die listed it at position number 86, and Paste magazine included it in a 2015 article on the seven best Bible-inspired comics. It was included on the syllabus of a 2008 literature course on "The Imagination of Disaster" at Duke University.
