= The Pogostick =

2003 dark humor comic book series

- Cover of The Pogostick #1. Art by Ethan Persoff.

Publication information
- Publisher: Fantagraphics Books
- Format: Limited series
- Genre: Alternative, black comedy, horror
- Publication date: February – December 2003
- No. of issues: 2

Creative team
- Written by: Al Columbia
- Artist: Ethan Persoff
- Editor: Kim Thompson

The Pogostick is an unfinished 2003 comic book series written by Al Columbia and drawn by Ethan Persoff. The series is a black comedy about the day-to-day struggles of Audrey Grinfield, a mentally disturbed office worker at an industrial design firm. Two issues were published by Fantagraphics Books in February and December 2003 before Columbia abandoned the story. The Pogostick was well received by critics, with The Sunday Guardian calling the series "a compelling read, one that might even cause you to re-evaluate your priorities in life." It was nominated for a 2004 Harvey Award for Best New Series.
