= Shintaro Kago =

Japanese manga artist

Shintaro Kago 駕籠 真太郎
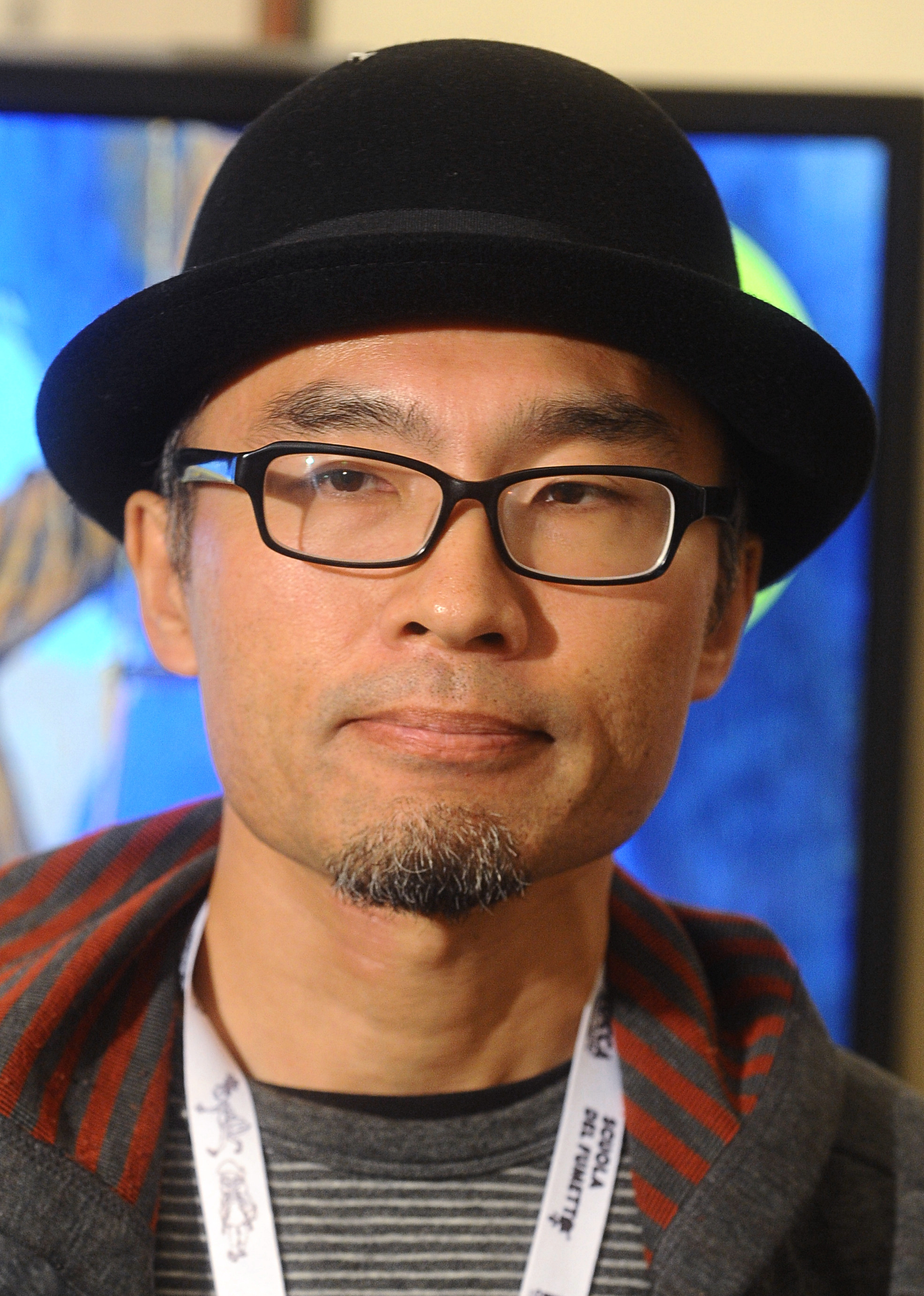
- Shintaro Kago at Lucca Comics & Games 2015
- Born: 1969 (age 56–57) Tokyo, Japan
- Area: Manga artist

Shintaro Kago (駕籠 真太郎, Kago Shintarō; born 1969) is a Japanese guro manga artist. He debuted in 1988 on the magazine COMIC BOX.

== Style ==
Shintaro Kago's style has been called "fashionable paranoia," although he has stated the term stems from Western media and he doesn't use it himself. He has been published in several adult manga magazines, gaining him considerable popularity. Many of his manga have strongly satirical overtones (heavily influenced by Monty Python), often parodying Japanese and Russian politics. Separately, he deals extensively with grotesque subjects such as extreme sex, rape, scatology and body modification (to the extent of forniphilia).

He has also written non-guro sci-fi manga, most notably Super-Conductive Brains Parataxis (超伝脳パラタクシス) for Weekly Young Jump. Many of his shorts are experimental and bizarre. He frequently breaks the fourth wall, and he likes to play with the page layout in extreme ways, mostly for comedic effect.

When asked about his influences, he's mentioned Shigeru Mizuki, Fujiko Fujio, Masamune Shiro, and Katsuhiro Otomo.

When not working in manga, he sculpts gag figurines of the same themes.

== In popular culture ==
On April 4, 2006, an exhibition of his works, Unsanitary Condition Exhibition (不衛生博覧会) was opened. The same month he held the opening of his movie convention: Shit Film Festival (うんこ映画祭).

From September 3–15, 2007, the Vanilla Gallery in Tokyo held another exhibition of his works, Unsanitary Festival in the Cool of the Night (納涼不衛生まつり). In 2013, Kago Shintaro was invited for a new exhibition outside of Japan titled Unsanitary Hong Kong Exhibition at CIA (Culture Industries Association).

His work has been seen as album material for the 2014 Flying Lotus release You're Dead!, released via Warp. He designed the album's cover artwork and provided illustrations for each of the album's songs, which are featured on the inner sleeves of the vinyl album. In addition, Kago designed the album cover for Offset's Bent Benevolence.

On June 17, 2022, Kago announced the development of his first anime, Abstraction, produced by DRP. The animated film will be based on tales from the Bible. To fund the work, Kago held a digital exhibition, Desiccation, for the purpose of selling NFTs of his work. It was followed by another exhibition, Eve of Revolution, showing behind-the-scenes content.

On July 24 2026, Kago won Eisner Award for Best Short Story for his work “Blood Harvest,” in the collection Brain Damage.

== List of works ==
Collections of One-Shots
* Brain Damage (collection of four one-shots)
  - Collects: 4 Labyrinth, Blood Harvest, Curse Room, and Portrait of Family
- Bride in Front of the Station (駅前花嫁) (collection of 13 one-shots)
  - Collects: Bride, Drawers, Excavations, Faucets, Fixation, The Flying Bride, Labyrinth, Particles, Pyromania, Reflexions, Saws, and Quartering
- Contamination with Foreign Matter (異物混入) (History Lesson #1-7 and 22 bonus one-shots)
  - Collects: History Lesson #1-7, The Abandoned Children Championship, Angel, The Anteater, The App From Hell, The Bang Wall, Cataclysm, The Dentist, Explosive Sexual Satisfaction Syndrome, The Genius of Cunnilingus, Grains of Rice, High Noon, Just Married, Maternal Instinct, A New Athletic Discipline, The New Minamida Funeral Services, New Product; Panda! Go, Panda; Phimosis Hunters, The Prison Guard, SM Temptation, Snot, and Stomatitis
- Dance! Kremlin Palace (踊る！クレムリン御殿) (collection of 12 one-shots)
  - Collects: Borscht Fight; Call The Storm!! Violent Soviet Land Strikes Back!!; The Cossacks, Perestroika and Me; His Excellency the Daredevil; I Can Hear The Warsaw Anthem; Let's Go Gorbies! Baseball Tournament; Let's Ride a Bicycle!; Love Beyond the Tundra; The Overthrown USSR; Summer Of Stress, Russian Summer; Under the Star of the Red Flag, and The What and Why Encyclopedia: What is Communism?!
- Dream Toy Factory (夢のおもちゃ工場) (The How and What #1-4 and nine one-shots)
  - Collects: The How and What #1-4, Closed Hospital, Drafting a Water Goddess, Dream Toy Factory, Lament of the Headless (aka Head Prolapse Elegy), Mr. Urashima, Sweet Fashion Notes, Tale of Reversed Oddity, White String, and White Teeth are Nice
- Eccentric Pictorial (奇人画報) (Collecting #1-6 and three bonus one-shots)
  - Collects: Collecting #1-6, Harakiri, Holy Night, and Voracious Itches
- Hannya Haramita (ハンニャハラミタ) (collection of seven one-shots)
  - Collects: Animal Kingdom, Aogeba Totoshi, Ataraxia, Demon Seed, Hannya Haramita, The Summer Bugs that Fly into Your Eyes, Tail Study
- Kasutoru Shiki (かすとろ式) (collection of 14 one-shots)
  - Collects: Abstraction, Akutagawa, Back Streets, Blow-Up, Communicable Mouth Disease (aka Oral Cavity Infectious Syndrome), Genesis, Local Tourist Information, Lord of the Ring, Memories of Others, Multiplication, No Need for Caution, Spinning Thoughts, Superglue, and When All's Said and Done
- Is It Possible for a Collision on the Way to School to Result in a Kiss? Experiment (登校途中の出会い頭の偶然キスはありうるか？実験) (collection of 45 works)
  - Collects: 19 art pieces, five Paranoia Street spin-off shorts, and 21 one-shots (The Apollo Conspiracy, The Art of Skinning, Burgers, Burn-Out, The "Can an Accidental Collision on the Way to School Result in a Kiss?" Experiment, Caries, Change, Disintegration of a Face, The Five-Second Rule, The Girl Nobody Noticed, The Implementation of Urban Legends, The Last Moments of a Manga Artist, The Mosquito-Crusher, No Parking, Paradise of the Bun, Rubik's Cube, Selective Memory, The Stretcher Rally, Summary; Terror on the Town!; and Tubes)
- More than Human (Godzilla #1-4, More than Human #1-3, and four one-shots)
  - Collects: Godzilla #1-4, More than Human #1-3, An Inquiry Concerning the Mechanistic World View of the Pituitary Gland, Japanese Fairy Tales, Rebellion, and Strange Land
- Murder Techniques Throughout the Ages (すべての時代を通じての殺人術) (collection of 11 one-shots)
  - Collects: The Artist's Hellscape, Blood Magic and the Spell of Love, A Convex World, The Dwarves and the Shoemaker (adapted from The Elves and the Shoemaker), Gipangu Products Don't Break, Malice of the Void, The Mystery of Sanae-san, Nice Balls, Super-Dimensional Love Gun, Vampirism Through the Ages, and Violent Homicide Friend Park
- Super-Dimensional Love Gun (Bizarre Manga Artist Shintaro Kago's Pretty Girls Collection) (collection of 15 one-shots)
  - Collects: Collecting #1: Touch (aka The Collection); Collecting #6: Loss (aka Fetus Collection); Communicable Mouth Disease (aka Oral Cavity Infectious Syndrome), India Station, Inviz, Lament of the Headless (aka Head Prolapse Elegy), Local Tourist Information, Miss Tomezuka's Refined Hobby, Ready-to-Assemble Super-Dimensional Love Gun, Shigure Konno's Blessed Life, The Summer Bugs that Fly into Your Eyes, Super-Dimensional Love Gun, Tono Station, The Town of Japan's Best Beauties, and White String
- Uneven Nymphomania (凸凹ニンフォマニア) (The Power Plant #1-3 and two one-shots)
  - Collects: The Power Plant #1-3, A Certain Hero's Death, and Guard Your Left

- A Lot of Sweets Jammed in the Head of a Girl (女の子の頭の中はお菓子がいっぱい詰まっています)
  - A collection of 96 Pretty Girl watercolor pieces set in Kago's absurdist playland featuring all your favorite scenes depicting over-the-top scenes of depravity, surreal dreamscapes, cannibalism, decapitation and, of course, dark comedy.
- Anamorphosis: Hell Beast (アナモルフォシスの冥獣) (seven chapters over one volume) (occurs after the events of Fraction)
  - Anamorphosis revolves around a group of people invited to a contest wherein they have to stay in a supposedly haunted set for 48 hours after an evil murderous spirit is summoned to produce a recreation of the murder scene.
  - Includes nine bonus stories: Behind, Bishoujo Tantei Tengai Sagiri, Changes, Hikikomori, Previous Life, Rainy Girl, Salesman, Small Present, and Weightlessness
- Dementia 21 (ディメンシャ 21) (34 chapters over two volumes)
  - Yukie Sakai is a sprightly young home health aide eager to help her elderly clients. But what seems like a straightforward job quickly turns into a series of increasingly surreal and bizarre adventures that put Yukie’s wits to the test!
- Fraction (フラクション) (eight chapters over one volume)
  - A serial killer known as The Slicing Devil is butchering young women, interspaced by a Kago self-insert explaining comic narrative manipulation.
  - Includes a bonus Interview With Shintaro Kago & Ryuichi Kasumi, and four bonus stories: Back From the Front, Collapse, Tremors, and Voracious Itches
- Harem End (ハーレムエンド) (eight chapters over one volume)
  - Itou Seita was supposed to be an ordinary college student, but suddenly he found himself in an anime-like situation when five girls – alien, little sister, childhood friend, tsundere, and fiancé – showed up in his apartment and decided to start living with him. Is this your typical harem or is there something else going on behind the scenes? A formerly popular but now disgraced and unemployed seiyuu and idol Hirahara Aya gets a generous proposal to voice the lead part, magical girl Killemall, in a mysterious animation company production. But is that company harboring certain secrets? Finally, how do these two stories connect together to lead to a perfect harem ending?
  - Includes bonus stories: Pretty Girl Detective Tengai Sagiri (Class Reunion of Death, Murder Train of Terror, and Sacrifice of Terror), Eraser, and Godly Ramen
- Panna Cotta (駕籠真太郎) (sequel to A Lot of Sweets Jammed in the Head of a Girl)
  - Another collection of 96 Pretty Girl watercolor pieces set in Kago's absurdist playland featuring all your favorite scenes depicting mischievous murder, amusing amputations and of course, heads exploding with candy goodness.
- Paranoia Street (パラノイアストリート) (29 chapters over three volumes)
  - Paranoia Street‘s story follows the fantastically absurd exploits of a wannabe detective and his female assistant who roam the Japanese countryside looking for work. Each chapter has them arriving at a new town plagued by some bizarre problem.
- The Princess of The Never-Ending Castle (無限の城のプリンセス) (11 chapters over one volume)
  - The Princess of The Never-Ending Castle takes place in an alternate timeline during the Japanese War for Unification. In true history, warlord Oda Nobunaga was betrayed and assassinated by his closest general, Akechi Mitsuhide. This story explores what would have happened if Nobunaga had defeated Mitsuhide and continued his rule.
- Shine! Greater East Asia Co-Prosperity Sphere (輝け!大東亜共栄圏) (11 chapters over one volume)
  - This early work from Kago is an alternative history of World War 2, in which the fighting nations discover a way to turn women into giant-sized biomechanical weapons (tanks, submarines, etc.) and use them as the primary method of warfare.
- Soul Diver Saga: Nirvana (潜魂想記NIRVANA（ナイオン）) (three chapters before cancellation)
- Super-Conductive Brains Parataxis (超伝脳パラタクシス) (eight chapters over one volume)
  - This manga presents different stories settled in a future world in which biomechanoids of any kind are created for every purpose. All the stories, through different angles and in a somewhat bizarre fashion, explore the same theme: are they mere machines or do they dream of electric sheep?
- Tract (five chapters over one volume)
  - A surreal and loose story of a world overwhelmed by a destructive strings and wires motif, told without any text.
- Ultra Power Mongol Invasion (超動力蒙古大襲来) (12 chapters over one volume)
  - For a long time, giants have existed in this world. They were used as tools and played an important role during turning points in history. The key to the secret lies in Mongolia. Discover Kago's peculiar vision of world history!
- Aiko, the 16 Year Old Girl (アイコ十六歳)
- Antlion vs Girl in Pieces (アリ地獄VSバラバラ少女)
- Atrocious Comedy in Front of the Station (喜劇駅前虐殺)
- Black Theater: Grandma Smells Like a Corpse (ブラックシアターおばあちゃんが死体くさいよ)
- Correct Perverted Sexual Desires (正しい変態性欲)
- Delusions That Jump Out at You: Kago Shintaro's Factorization
- Eccentric People Magazine (奇人画報)
- Health Plan (健康の設計)
- Industrial Revolution and World War
- Manga of Hole, Character, Blood, Etc. Appearances (穴、文字、血液などが現れる漫画)
- Notebook of Murder and Killing (殺殺草紙・大江戸奇騒天外)
- The Book of Killing and Killing - Thirteen Horrible Sufferings in Great Edo (殺殺草紙・大江戸無残十三苦) (2004, one-shot)
- Six Consciousnesses Thought Changing Ataraxia (六識転想アタラクシア)
- Sudden Delusion (飛び出す妄想)
- Superhuman (人間以上)
- Wandering Cartoon Eccentricities in Front of the Station (駅前浪漫奇行)
- Specials and Uncollected One-Shots
  - Battle in Outer Space
  - The Big Funeral
  - Communication
  - The Desperate Sadness of a Cross-Section
  - Disc
  - Drunkard Condo Syndrome
  - Erotic Game
  - Everything's Peaceful
  - Funeral Views
  - Ghosts
  - Giant Girl Explosion
  - Godzilla vs. Gigan
  - Harakiri Girls
  - How to Suicide
  - Iwa and Izaemon
  - Many Times of Joy and Sorrow
  - Moshi – Daily Life of the Schoolgirl Zombies
  - My Beloved Lady
  - The Pleasure of a Slippery Cross-Section
  - Pretty Girl Picture Book
  - Punctures
  - Safety Hit
  - Springs
  - Supergirl Begins
  - White Spectacle
