= Amnesiac gene =

Amnesiac neuropeptides

Identifiers
- Organism: Drosophila melanogaster
- Symbol: amn
- UniProt: Q24049
Search for
- Structures: Swiss-model
- Domains: InterPro

The amnesiac (amn) gene in Drosophila is a mutant suppressor of the dunce gene. The gene produces a neuropeptide of the same name.

== Biological role ==
By suppressing dunce through mutagenesis, the amnesiac gene plays a role in reproduction of Drosophila because dunce is the sterility gene. This molecule has similar peptides to pituitary adenylyl cyclase-activating peptide (PACAP) and growth hormone-releasing hormone (GHRH). The biological role of amnesiac gene is activating the adenyl cyclase second messenger pathway (cAMP) involved in its memory retrieval through these two peptides. The sensory and motor capabilities of amnesiac are normal, but it is memory retrieval that is affected, not storage. The amnesiac gene is directly involved in development of memory retrieval in the brain along with alcohol sensitivity patterning.

== Clinical relevance ==
Defects associated with amnesiac gene include: increased sensitivity to alcohol, normal initial memory, and failure for adult memory formation. Defects associated with amnesiac are due to the behavior of amn as a sex-linked recessive on the X chromosome. An abnormality on one allele of the genetic mutant, amnesiac, that increases sensitivity to alcohol is called cheapdate. Scientists have not generated a knockout model yet for the amnesiac gene due to the mutant effects created on multiple genes along with the need for further research studies about the amnesiac gene.
