= Raycol =

Film color process

Raycol was a two-color additive film color process developed by the chemist Anton Bernardi in 1929. It was used by Maurice Elvey to film The School for Scandal, but was commercially unsuccessful.

It used frames shot through red and blueish-green filters, which were recorded on standard black-and-white film stock, and projected with red and white light respectively.

It was covered by British patents 329,438 and 335,038.
