= Pim & Francie: The Golden Bear Days =

2009 cartoon book

- Creator: Al Columbia
- Date: September 2009
- Main characters: Pim & Francie
- Page count: 240 pages
- Publisher: Fantagraphics

Original publication
- Language: English
- ISBN: 978-1-60699-304-0; 978-2492042027 (French)

Pim & Francie: The Golden Bear Days is a 2009 book by cartoonist Al Columbia. Subtitled "Artifacts and Bone Fragments", it is a sketchbook-like assemblage of illustrations, paintings, sketches, and unfinished comics featuring his impish, Hansel and Gretel-like characters Pim and Francie, drawn over a period of more than ten years. According to Columbia, the book's fragmentary vignettes "were all attempts [to] make a full-fledged comic and do things right - to put out comics regularly. But it just never really happened that way for me." It was published by Fantagraphics.

Pim & Francie was named one of the best graphic novels of the year by The Village Voice and the Austin American-Statesman and garnered positive reviews in other venues including Publishers Weekly, Booklist, and The A.V. Club. It was also received enthusiastically in the comics press and earned Columbia two Ignatz Award nominations, for Outstanding Artist and Outstanding Graphic Novel. Thrillist included it on their 2016 list of the 33 greatest graphic novels of all time.

In 2017 Fantagraphics released a second printing of Pim & Francie and made the title available digitally on Amazon's ComiXology and Kindle platforms. In 2021 the Paris-based company Huber Éditions published two French language versions of the book: a regular edition and a collector's edition with a variant cover limited to 100 copies. Both of the French editions were in a larger, 25 cm (9.84 in) square format compared to the 8.25 in square dimensions of the original Fantagraphics version.
