= Last Night (Ian Carey song) =

Single by Ian Carey featuring Snoop Dogg and Bobby Anthony
- Released: February 11, 2011
- Recorded: 2010
- Genre: House, hip hop, hip house
- Label: Vicious Recordings (Australia), GFAB Records
- Songwriters: Snoop Dogg, Ian Harshman, Robert Luera, Emmanuel "Manny" Mijares, Jenson Vaughan

Ian Carey singles chronology
"Let Loose" (2010)	"Last Night" (2011)	"Amnesia" (2012)

Snoop Dogg singles chronology
"Mr Endowed (Remix)" (2011)	"Last Night" (2011)	"Boom" (2011)

"Last Night" is a song released by House DJ Ian Carey. The track features lyrics by urban superstar Snoop Dogg and Bobby Anthony.

== Track listing ==
Australian digital single

1. "Last Night" – 3:09
2. "Last Night" (extended version) – 4:54

Remixes

1. "Last Night" (Afrojack Remix) – 5:22
2. "Last Night" (Spencer & Hill Remix) – 7:04
3. "Last Night" (R3hab Remix) – 4:22
4. "Last Night" (Dani L. Mebius Remix) – 6:15
5. "Last Night" (Afrojack Dub Edit) – 5:18

== Charts ==
Chart (2011)	Peak position
Australia (ARIA)	15
Canada (Canadian Hot 100)	24
Canada CHR/Top 40 (Billboard)	15
Canada Hot AC (Billboard)	41
Netherlands (Mega Top 100)	77

=== Year-end charts ===
Chart (2011)	Position
Australia (ARIA)	92

=== Certifications ===
Country	Certifications	Sales
Australia	Platinum	70,000+
Canada	Gold	40,000+
