= I Was Killing When Killing Wasn't Cool =

Seymour and Knishkebibble encounter Cinnamon Jack in "I Was Killing When Killing Wasn't Cool"

A still from the 1925 Out of the Inkwell cartoon "Ko-Ko Nuts"

"I Was Killing When Killing Wasn't Cool" is an 8-page comic by Al Columbia that appeared in the fourth issue (August 1995) of the comics anthology Zero Zero. It was originally created for the never-published third issue (#2) of Columbia's comic book series The Biologic Show. Its title alludes to the 1981 song "I Was Country When Country Wasn't Cool".

== Synopsis ==
Seymour Sunshine and Knishkebibble the Monkey-Boy read an announcement by Alexander Crowley promising a reward "in excess of $1,000,000,000" to whoever can acquire one of the hummingbird pies baked by Cinnamon Jack, a blind man said to have murdered his own twin brother. The garrulous Knishkebibble browbeats the mute, reluctant Seymour into joining him in an attempt to recover one of the pies. As the two approach Cinnamon Jack's cottage, they find it surrounded by the impaled heads of his victims. Jack, a scowling, heavyset man wearing dark glasses and carrying an oversized folding blade, stands in front of the doorway. When Knishkebibble rudely demands one of his pies, Jack cuts off Seymour's nose, then attacks Knishkebibble. Knishkebibble dodges Jack's swings, leaps onto his back, and kills him by prying open his jaw until it breaks off. He hands Seymour's nose back to him with a resigned sigh, and they enter the cottage.

The two are disappointed to find the inside of Jack's single-room dwelling barren except for a bathtub, a mirror, and a bowl containing the remains of a small animal. While Knishkebibble amuses himself in the empty bathtub, Seymour looks into the mirror and is puzzled by the appearance of an orange dot in the center of his forehead. When he touches it he experiences a vision of his brain being removed from his skull, and shuts his eyes in fear. Reopening them, he finds a pale doppelgänger with pointed ears grinning at him in the mirror. Seymour flees across the room in a panic and runs into a wall, knocking himself unconscious. The doppelgänger climbs out of the mirror and capers about the room while transforming his body in strange ways. Turning his hand into a revolver, he shoots and kills Knishkebibble.

Coming to, Seymour picks up a brick laying on the floor and throws it at the doppelgänger, but the projectile dissolves into a swarm of moths. The doppelgänger surprises Seymour by offering a handshake, which he hesitantly accepts, and tells him "Pleasure to make your acquaintance," to which he replies "Oh, likewise I'm sure." As the two shake hands, the doppelgänger's hand suddenly turns into a pair of clippers which cut off Seymour's hand at the wrist. Seymour glances down at his severed limb in alarm, then looks up to see the doppelgänger's head changing into a malevolent, serpentlike form as it moves towards him. The story ends enigmatically with an exterior view of the cottage at dusk.

== Analysis ==
While its plot is rudimentary — Paul Gravett summed it up as "Knishkebibble the Monkey-Boy and his hapless crony Seymour meet the Devil and die" — "I Was Killing When Killing Wasn't Cool" is admired for its meticulous design and its powerful evocation of mood. Tom Spurgeon wrote that it "allows the reader to slowly realize, like the best horror films, that the adventure you are currently enjoying is going to end in ways too terrible to imagine." An editorial in the final issue of Zero Zero noted that issue #4 "always sells out before any other issues at conventions, even when we take extras," on the strength of Columbia's contribution.

"I Was Killing When Killing Wasn't Cool" was among the first of Columbia's comics to conspicuously show the influence of the animated cartoons of Fleischer Studios, particularly the Out of the Inkwell series with Koko the Clown and dark, surreal shorts such as Bimbo's Initiation and Swing You Sinners!. The story's dense layout, which fits as many as 32 small panels into each page, creates a strong sense of visual rhythm similar to that of the Fleischer films. Also, its two color palette, which is restricted to copious fluorescent orange and small amounts of brown, recalls the look of the studio's Cinecolor Color Classics shorts of the 1930s. Columbia explicitly acknowledges the Fleischer influence at the end of the story, offering them his "sincerest apologies."

According to Eric Reynolds, Columbia listened to the Kicking Giant song "She's Real" obsessively while drawing "I Was Killing When Killing Wasn't Cool".
