= RG color models =

Red and green color space

An RG color model is a dichromatic color model represented by red and green primary colors. These can only reproduce a fraction of the colors possible with a trichromatic color space, such as for human color vision.

The name of the model comes from the initials of the two primary colors: red and green. The model may be either additive or subtractive.

It was used to display 3D images using anaglyphs since the 1850s. Despite its shortcomings in color reproduction, the RG model was used in early color processes for films from 1906 to 1929 (Kinemacolor, Prizma, Technicolor, Brewster Color, Kodachrome I and Raycol).

== Additive RG ==
The additive RG color model uses red and green primaries. It was used in several processes during the early innovations of color photography, including Kinemacolor, Prizma, Technicolor I, and Raycol.

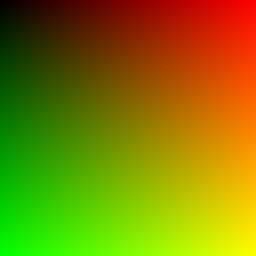
Gamut of an additive RG color model

The primaries are added together in varying proportions to reproduce a linear gamut of colors, which can reproduce only a fraction of the colors possible with a trichromatic color space.

The appearance of the color gamut changes depending on the primary colors chosen. When the primaries are complementary colors (e.g. red and cyan), then an equal mixture of the primaries will yield a neutral color (gray or white). However, since red and green are not complementary colors, an equal mixture of these primaries will yield yellow, and a neutral color cannot be reproduced by the color space.

Until recently, its primary use was in low-cost LED displays in which red and green LEDs were more common and cheaper than the still nascent blue LED technology. However, this preference no longer applies to modern devices. In modern applications, the red and green primaries are equal to the primaries used in typical RGB color spaces. In this case, the RG color model can be achieved by disabling the blue light source.

The additive RG color model showing the primary colors. Overlap area is an equal mixture thereof (yellow), not white.

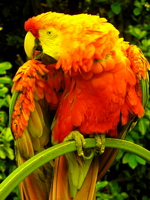
Additive RG (modern example image).

Additive RG Kinemacolor frame from Two Clowns (c.1907).

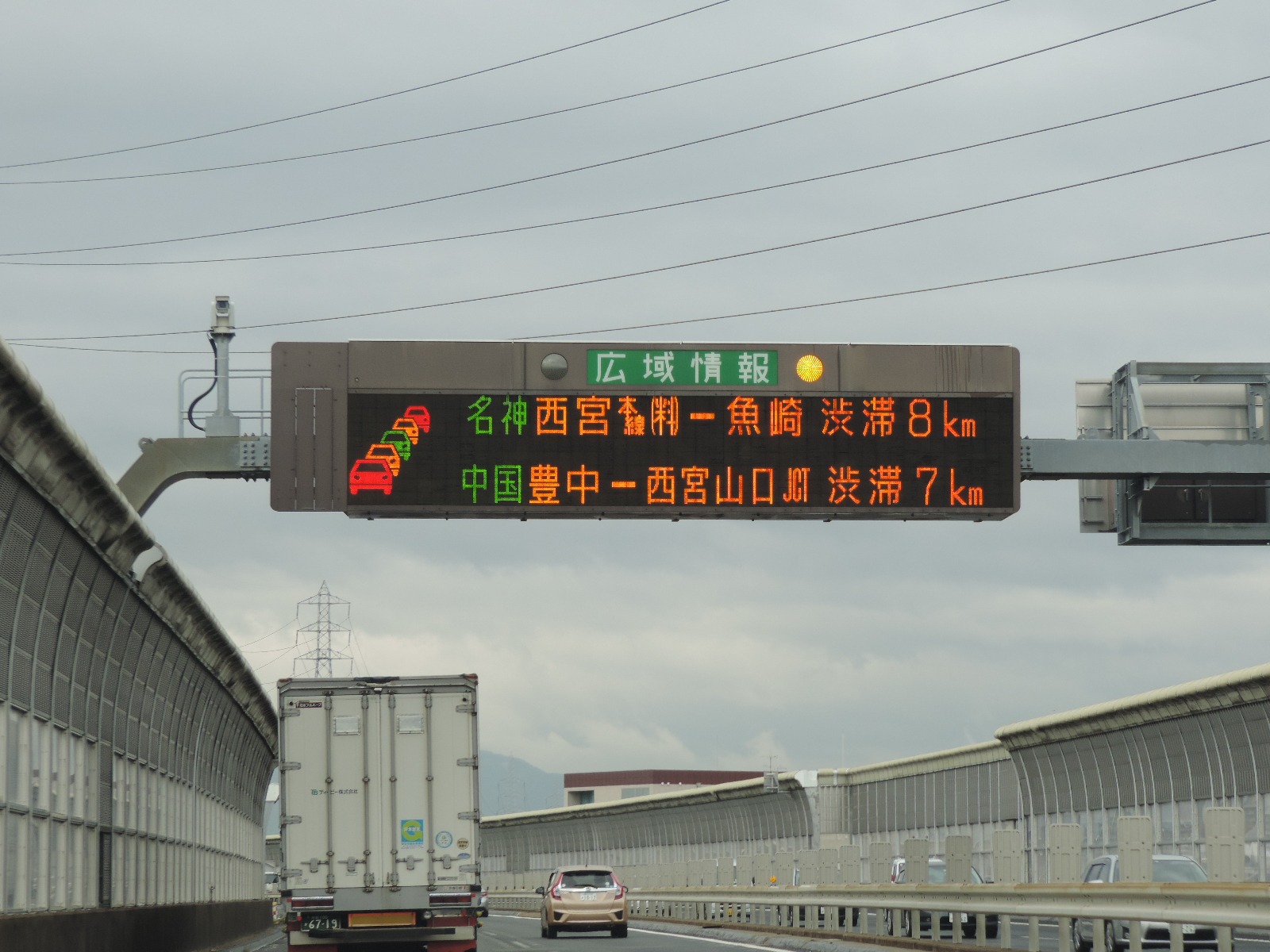
Red and green LED traffic sign.

== Subtractive RG ==
The subtractive RG color model uses red and green filters for film exposure, but complementary cyan-green (for red) and orange-red (for green) for the developed prints. This allows the generation of white, although the color model cannot achieve black, regardless of the primaries chosen. It was used in several processes during the early innovations of color photography, including on Brewster Color I, Kodachrome I, Prizma II, and Technicolor II.

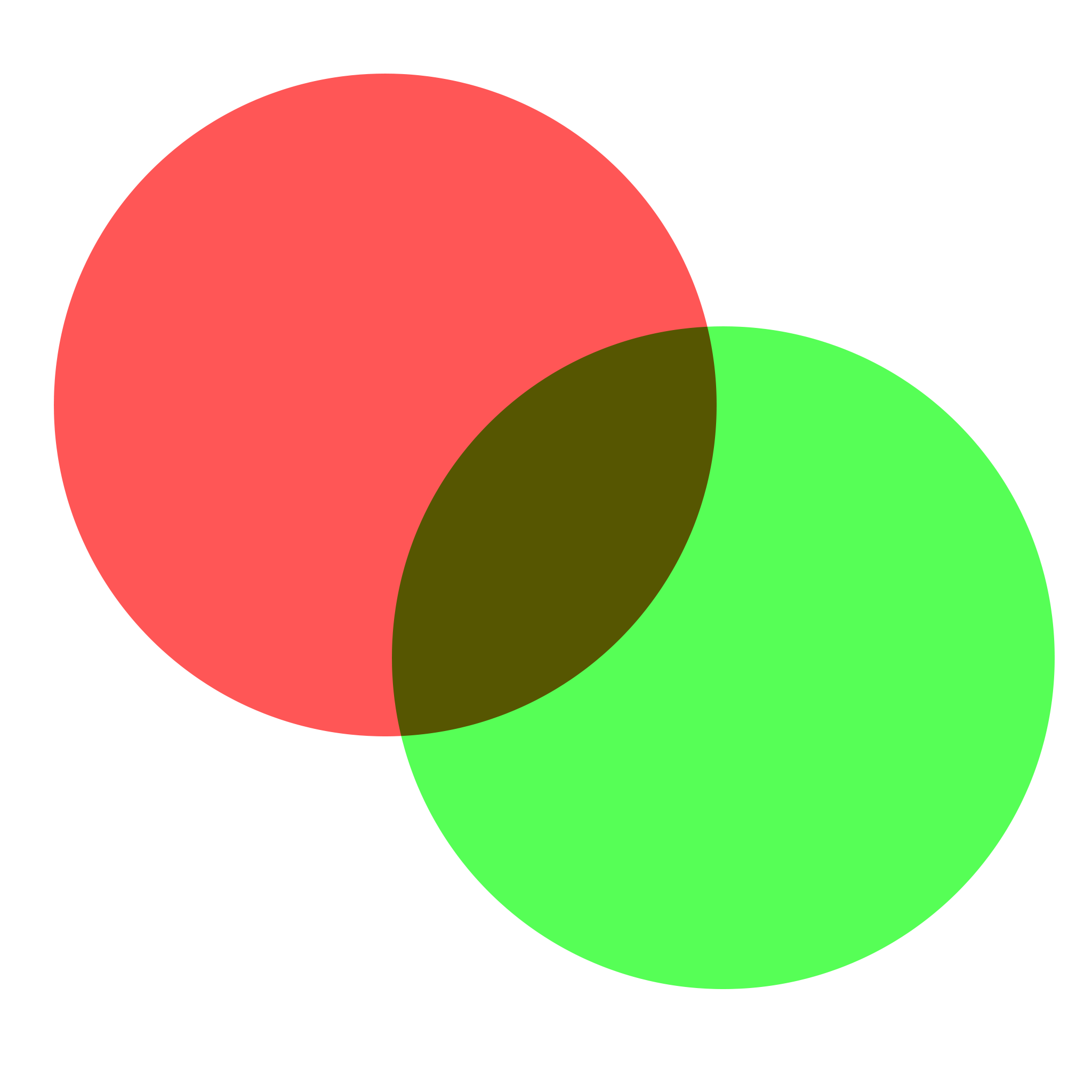
The subtractive RG color model showing the primary colors. Overlap area is dark brown, not true black.

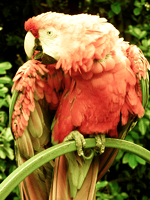
Subtractive RG (modern example image).

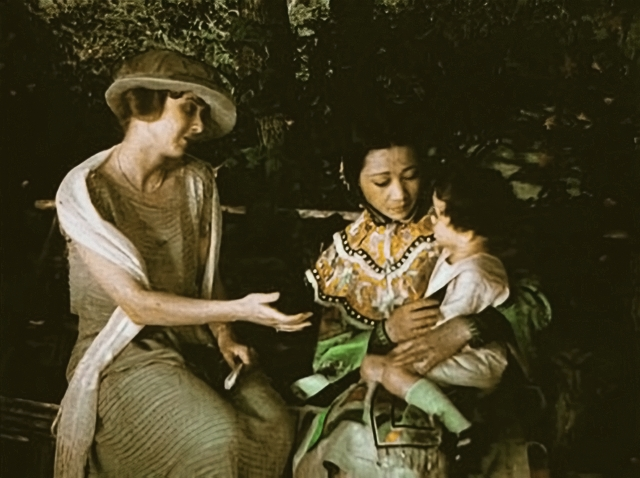
Subtractive RG Technicolor II frame from The Toll of the Sea (1922)

== Subtractive RGK ==
The subtractive RGK color model showing the primary colors, but where the mixture is obfuscated by the black channel.

A similar color model, called RGK adds a black channel, which allows for the reproduction of black and other dark shades. However, it does not allow the reproduction of neutral colors (gray/white) because the primaries are not complementary.

Outside of a few low-cost high-volume applications, such as packaging and labelling, RG and RGK are no longer in use because devices providing larger gamuts such as CMYK are in widespread use.

== Anaglyph 3D ==
In 1858, in France, Joseph D'Almeida delivered a report to l'Académie des sciences describing how to project three-dimensional magic lantern slide shows using red and green filters to an audience wearing red and green goggles. Subsequently he was chronicled as being responsible for the first realisation of 3D images using anaglyphs.

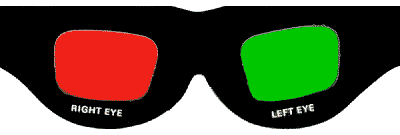
Red-green anaglyph glasses

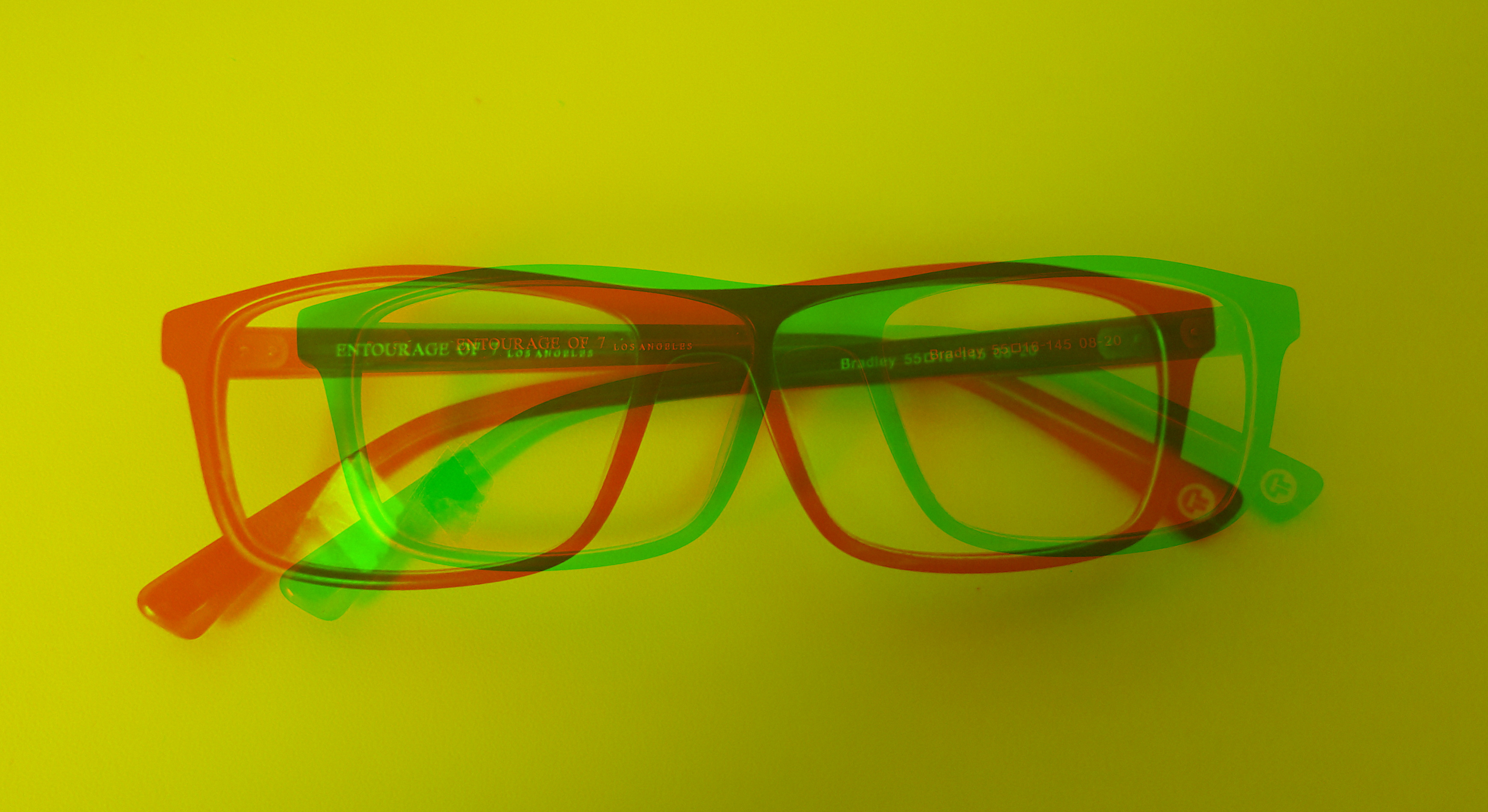
Red/Green anaglyph picture

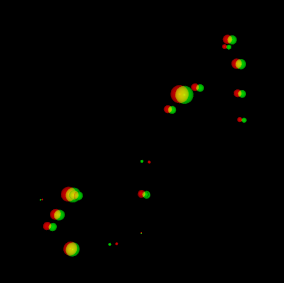
Constellation of Scorpius in 3D anaglyph for red-green glasses. The perception of depth depends on how the image is scaled.

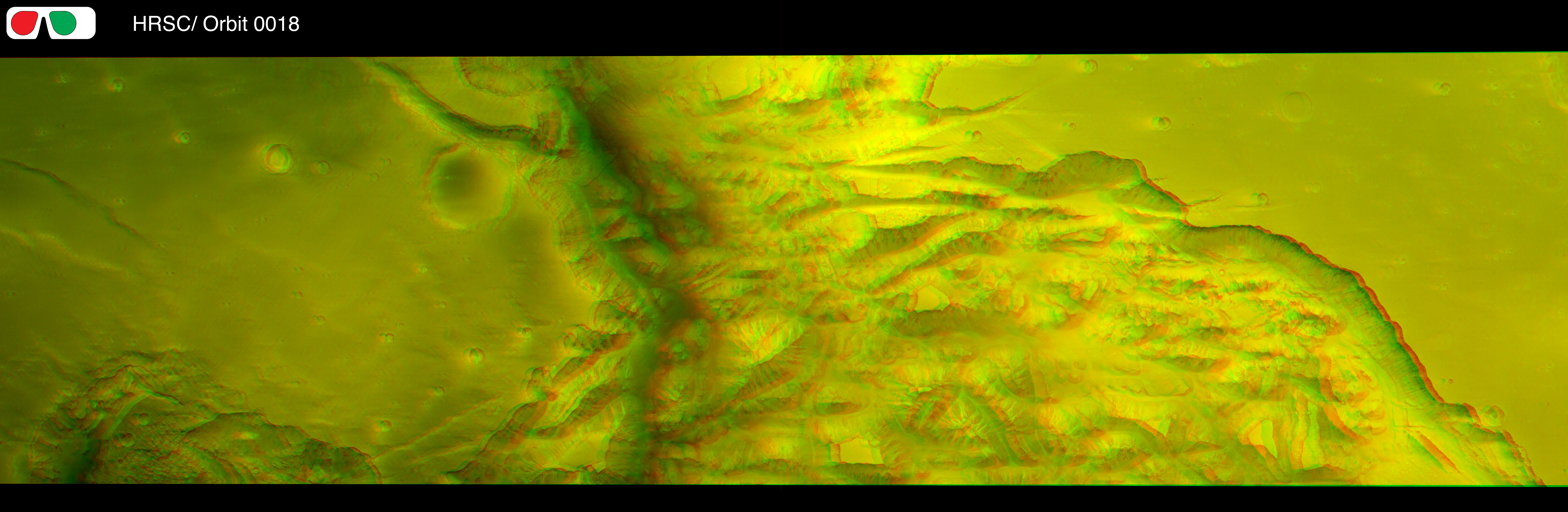
3D image taken by ESA's Mars Express orbiter. The location is on the Martian equator north of Valles Marineris between 1° South to 2.5° North and 323° East. The area is 50 km across and shows mesas and cliffs as well as flow features indicating erosion by the action of flowing water. In this landscape view North is on the right. The 3D effect is only seen with the use of red/green 3D glasses.

== See also ==
- List of monochrome and RGB color formats
- List of motion picture film formats
- List of color film systems
- rg chromaticity
- Anaglyphic color channels
