= Lenticular printing =

Technology for creating optical illusions

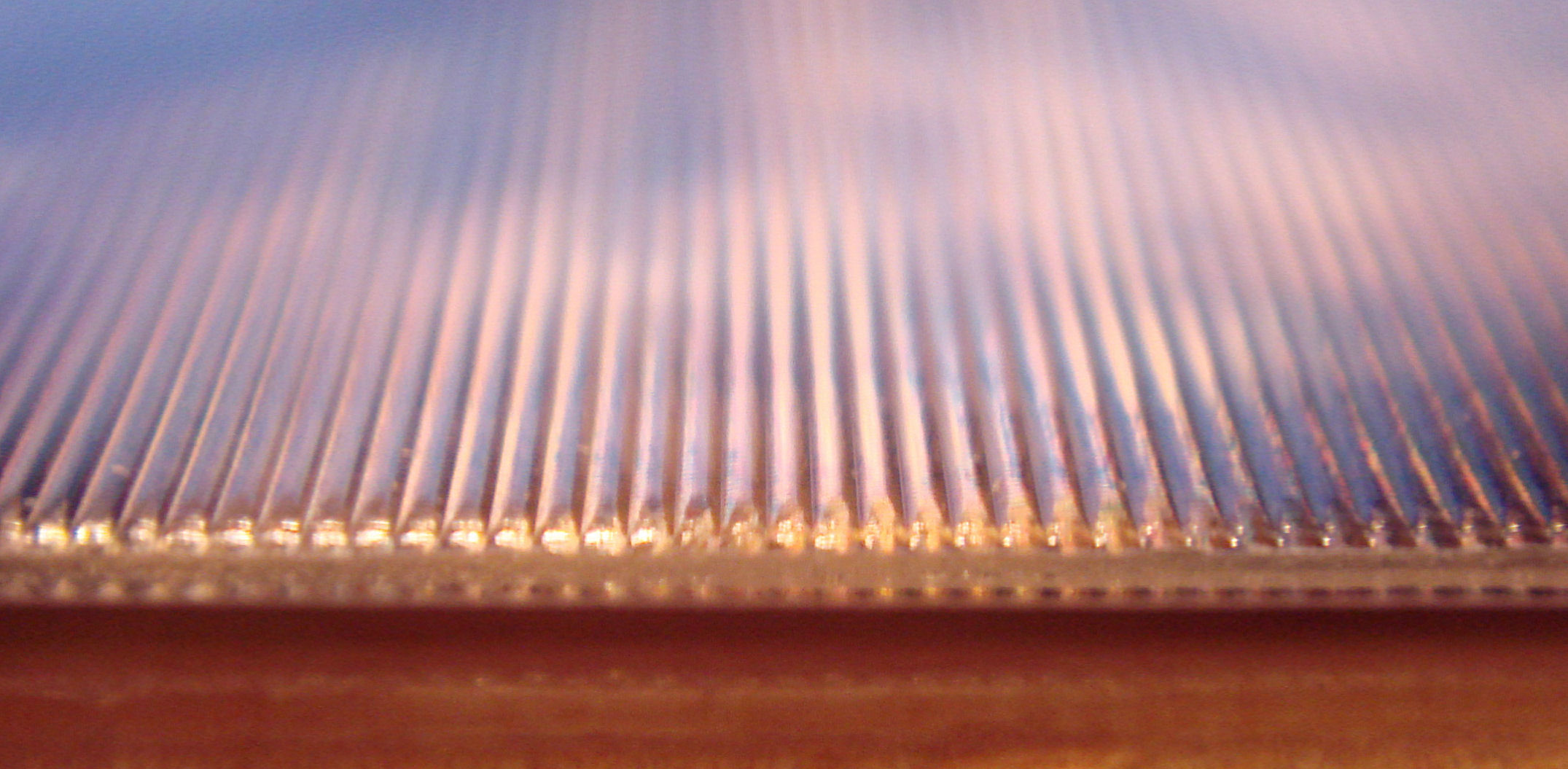
Close-up of the surface of a lenticular print

Lenticular printing is a technology in which lenticular lenses (a technology also used for 3D displays) are used to produce printed images with an illusion of depth, or the ability to change or move as they are viewed from different angles.

Examples include flip and animation effects such as winking eyes, and modern advertising graphics whose messages change depending on the viewing angle. It can be used to create frames of animation, for a motion effect; offsetting the various layers at different increments, for a 3D effect; or simply to show sets of alternative images that appear to transform into each other.

Colloquial terms for lenticular prints include "flickers", "winkies", "wiggle pictures", and "tilt cards". The trademarks Vari-Vue and Magic Motion are often used for lenticular pictures, without regard to the actual manufacturer.

== Process ==
Principle of operation of an animated or 3D lenticular print, showing repetition of views

Lenticular printing is a multi-step process that consists of creating a lenticular image from at least two images, and placing it behind a lenticular lens.

=== Creation and interlacing of images ===
Once the images are collected, they are arranged in individual frame files, then digitally combined into a single file in a process called interlacing. Interlacing can be done manually using a raster graphics editor or using dedicated interlacing software.

=== Printing and assembly ===
The interlaced image may be printed directly on the back (smooth side) of the lens, or on a substrate (ideally a synthetic paper) that is laminated to the lens. When printing on the backside of the lens, the critical registration of the fine "slices" of interlaced images must be absolutely correct during the lithographic or screen printing process to avoid "ghosting" and poor image definition.

=== Variations and effects ===
The combined lenticular print shows two or more images by changing the angle from which the print is viewed. If a sequence of images is used, it can even show a short animation.

Though normally produced in sheet form by interlacing simple images or colors throughout the artwork, lenticular images can also be created in roll form with 3D effects or multi-color changes. Alternatively, several images of the same object, taken from slightly different angles, can be used to create a lenticular print with a stereoscopic 3D effect. 3D effects can be achieved only in a lateral (side-by-side) orientation, as each of the viewer's eyes must see them from a slightly different angle to achieve the stereoscopic effect. Other effects, like morphs, motion, and zooms work better (with less ghosting or latent effects) in top-to-bottom orientation, but can be achieved in both orientations.

=== Materials and manufacturing processes ===
There are many commercial processes in the manufacture of lenticular images, which can be made from PVC, APET, acrylic, and PETG, as well as other materials. While PETG and APET are the most common, other materials are becoming popular to accommodate outdoor use and special forming due to the increasing use of lenticular images on items such as gift cards. Lithographic lenticular printing allows for the flat side of the lenticular sheet to have ink placed directly onto the lens, while high-resolution photographic lenticulars typically have the image laminated to the lens.

Lenticular images saw a surge in popularity in the first decade of the 21st century, appearing on the cover of the May 2006 issue of Rolling Stone, trading cards, sports posters, and signs in stores that help to attract buyers.

== Construction ==
Images are interlaced on the substrate

Each image is arranged (slicing) into strips, which are then interlaced with one or more similarly arranged images (splicing). These are printed on the back of a piece of plastic, with a series of thin lenses molded into the opposite side. Alternatively, the images can be printed on paper, which is then bonded to the plastic. With the new technology, lenses are printed in the same printing operation as the interlaced image, either on both sides of a flat sheet of transparent material, or on the same side of a sheet of paper, the image being covered with a transparent sheet of plastic or with a layer of transparent, which in turn is printed with several layers of varnish to create the lenses.

The lenses are accurately aligned with the interlaces of the image, so that light reflected off each strip is refracted in a slightly different direction, but the light from all pixels originating from the same original image is sent in the same direction. The result is that a single eye looking at the print sees a single whole image, but two eyes will see different images, which leads to stereoscopic 3D perception.

== Types of lenticular prints ==
There are three distinct types of lenticular prints, distinguished by how great a change in angle of view is required to change the image:

Transforming prints
Here two or more different pictures are used, and the lenses are designed to require a relatively large change in angle of view to switch from one image to another. This allows viewers to easily see the original images, since small movements cause no change. Larger movement of the viewer or the print causes the image to flip from one image to another (the "flip effect"). An example of this is the lenticular print of hockey player Mario Tremblay at Centre Mario-Tremblay in Alma, Quebec, where he is transformed from a minor hockey playing boy as an Alma Eagle into the professional hockey playing man, four years later, as a Montreal Canadien.
Animated prints
Here the distance between different angles of view is "medium", so that while both eyes usually see the same picture, moving a little bit switches to the next picture in the series. Two or more sequential images are used, with only small differences between each image and the next. This can be used to create an image that moves ("motion effect"), or can create a "zoom" or "morph" effect, in which part of the image expands in size or changes shape as the angle of view changes. The movie poster of the film Species II is an example of this technique.
Stereoscopic effects
Here the change in viewing angle needed to change images is small, so that each eye sees a slightly different view. This creates a 3D effect without requiring special glasses, using two or more images. For example, the Dolby-Philips Lenticular 3D display produces 28 different images.

== Motorized lenticular ==
With static (non-motorized) lenticular, the viewer either moves the piece or moves past the piece in order to see the graphic effects. With motorized lenticular, a motor moves the graphics behind the lens, enabling the graphic effects while both the viewer and the display remain stationary.

== History ==
=== Predecessors ===
==== Tabula scalata ====
Corrugated images that change when viewed from different angles predate the development of lenticular printing. A few examples from the Paleolithic era exist in French caves. Tabula scalata or "turning pictures" were popular in England since the 16th century. Extant double paintings, with two distinct images on a corrugated panel, are known from the 17th century.

H.C.J. Deeks used a similar technique with minute vertical corrugations pressed into photographic paper and then exposed to two different images from two different angles. Under a 1906 patent H.C.J. Deeks & Co marketed a Puzzle Post Card or Photochange Post Card. In 1907 a Colorchange Post Card followed, featuring identical pictures on each side of the corrugations that were sprayed with different "liquid pigment or coloring matter" on (parts of) each side.

==== Barrier grid autostereograms and animation ====
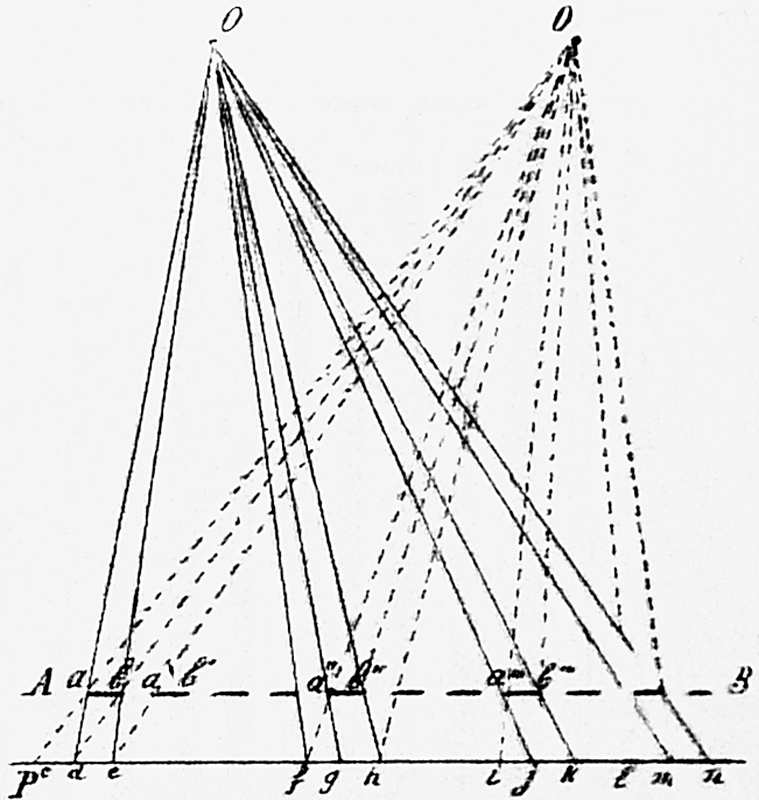
Berthier's diagram: A-B=glass plate, with a-b=opaque lines, P=Picture, O=Eyes, c-n=blocked and allowed views (Le Cosmos 05–1896)

The oldest known publication about using a line sheet as a parallax barrier to produce an autostereogram is found in an article by Auguste Berthier in the French scientific magazine "Le Cosmos" of May 1896. Berthier's idea was hardly noticed, but American inventor Frederic Eugene Ives had more success with his similar parallax stereogram since 1901. He also patented the technique for a "Changeable sign, picture, &c." in 1903, which showed different pictures from different angles (instead of one stereoscopic image from the proper angle and distance). Léon Gaumont introduced Ives' pictures in France and encouraged Eugène Estanave to work on the technique. Estanave patented a barrier grid technique for animated autostereograms. Animated portrait photographs with line sheets were marketed for a while, mostly in the 1910s and 1920s. In the US "Magic Moving Picture" postcards with simple 3 phase animation or changing pictures were marketed after 1906. Maurice Bonnett improved barrier grid autostereography in the 1930s with his relièphographie technique and scanning cameras.

On 11 April 1898 John Jacobson filed an application for US patent No. 624,043 (granted 2 May 1899) for a Stereograph of an interlaced stereoscopic picture and "a transparent mount for said picture having a corrugated or channeled surface". The corrugated lines or channels were not yet really lenticular, but this is the first known autostereogram that used a corrugated transparent surface rather than the opaque lines of most barrier grid stereograms.

=== Gabriel Lippmann's integral photography ===
French Nobel Prize winning physicist Gabriel Lippmann represented Eugène Estanave at several presentations of Estanave's works at the French Academy of Sciences. On 2 March 1908 Lippmann presented his own ideas for "photographie intégrale", based on insect eyes. He suggested to use a screen of tiny lenses. Spherical segments should be pressed into a sort of film with photographic emulsion on the other side. The screen would be placed inside a lightproof holder and on a tripod for stability. When exposed each tiny lens would function as a camera and record the surroundings from a slightly different angle than neighboring lenses. When developed and lit from behind the lenses should project the life-size image of the recorded subject in space. He could not yet present concrete results in March 1908, but by the end of 1908 he claimed to have exposed some Integral photography plates and to have seen the "resulting single, full-sized image". However, the technique remained experimental since no material or technique seemed to deliver the optical quality desired. At the time of his death in 1921 Lippmann reportedly had a system with only twelve lenses.

=== Early lenticular methods ===
On 11 April 1898, John Jacobson filed an application for US patent No. 624,043 (granted 2 May 1899) for a Stereograph of an interlaced stereoscopic picture and "a transparent mount for said picture having a corrugated or channeled surface".

In 1912, Louis Chéron described in his French patent 443,216 a screen with long vertical lenses that would be sufficient for recording "stereoscopic depth and the shifting of the relations of objects to each other as the viewer moved", while he suggested pinholes for integral photography.

In June 1912, Swiss Nobel Prize winning physiologist Walter Rudolf Hess applied for a US patent for a Stereoscopic picture with a "celluloid covering having a surface composed of cylindrical lens elements". US patent 1,128,979 (published 16 February 1915) was one of several patents in different countries he would register for this technique. The company Stereo-Photographie A.G., registered in Zürich in 1914 and 1915, would produce pictures on transparencies through Hess' process. Few examples of these pictures are still known to have survived. They are circa 3 1/6 × 4 inches black and white pictures (with discolored or intentional hues) and labeled on their passe-partouts "Stereo-Photo nach W.R. Hess - Stereo-Photographie A.G. Zürich. Patente: "Schweiz / Deutschland / Frankreich / Italien / England / Oesterreich / Vereinigte Staaten angemeldet". The Société française de photographie has three lenticular "Stereo-photo" plates in their collection, three more were on auction in 2017.

Herbert E. Ives, son of Frederic Eugene Ives, was one of several researchers who worked on lenticular sheets in the 1920s. These were basically simpler versions of Lippmann's integral photography and had a linear array of small plano-convex cylindrical lenses (lenticules).

The first successful commercial application of the lenticular technique was not used for 3D or motion display but for color movies. Eastman Kodak's 1928 Kodacolor film was based on Keller-Dorian cinematography. It used 16 mm black and white sensitive film embossed with 600 lenses per square inch for use with a filter with RGB stripes. In the 1930s several US patents relating to lenticular techniques were granted, mostly for color film.

On 15 December 1936, Douglas F. Winnek Coffey was granted US patent 2,063,985 (application 24 May 1935) for an "Apparatus for making a composite stereograph". The description does not include changing pictures or animation concepts.

=== Further history ===
During World War II, research for military purposes was done into 3D imaging, including lenticular technologies. Mass production of plastics and the technique of injection moulding came about around the same period and enabled commercially viable production of lenticular sheets for novelty toys and advertisements.

==== Victor Anderson and Vari-Vue ====
During World War II, Victor G. Anderson worked for the Sperry Corporation, where 3D imaging was used for military instructional products, for instance on how to use a bomb sight. After the war, Anderson started his company Pictorial Productions Inc. A patent application for a Process in the assembling of changeable picture display devices was filed on 1 March 1952 and granted on 3 December 1957 (US patent 2,815,310). Anderson stated in 1996 that the company's first product was the I Like Ike button. The presidential campaign button's image changed from the slogan "I Like Ike" (in black letters on white) into a black and white picture of Ike Eisenhower when viewed from different angles. It was copyrighted on 14 May 1952. In December 1953 the company registered their trademark Vari-Vue. Vari-Vue further popularized lenticular images during the 1950s and 1960s. By the late sixties, the company marketed about two thousand stock products including twelve-inch-square (30 cm) moving pattern and color sheets, large images (many religious), billboards, and novelty toys. The company was liquidated in a security agreement sale in 1988 and the production line was sold to Frank X. Didik who operates the Vari-Vue.com website.

==== Xograph ====
Look magazine of 25 February 1964 introduced the publisher's "parallax panoramagram" technology with 8 million copies of a 10x12 cm black and white card with a photographic 3D image of an Edison bust surrounded by some inventions. A 10 x 12 cm full color picture of a model promoting Kodel followed on 7 April. The technique was soon trademarked as "xograph" by Cowles' daughter company Visual Panographics Inc. Magazines like Look and Venture published xographs until the mid-1970s. Some baseball cards were produced as xographs. Images produced by the company ranged from just a few millimeters (0.1 inch) to 28 by 19.5 inches (71 by 50 cm).

==== Other early companies ====
In the 1960s, more companies manufactured lenticular products, including Hallmark Cards (registering the Magic Motion trademark in 1964), Reflexa (Nürnberg, Germany), Toppan (Tokyo, Japan) and Dai-Nippon (Japan).

OptiGraphics Corporation of Grand Prairie, Texas was formed in 1970 and—under the guidance of Victor Anderson, working well into his 80s. The company trademarked Magic Motion in 1976. Optigraphics produced the lenticular prizes for Cracker Jack in the 1980s, 7-Eleven Slurpee lenticular sports coins from 1983 to 1987, and in 1986 it produced the first set of 3D traditional baseball cards marketed as Sportflics, which ultimately led to the creation of Pinnacle Brands. In 1999 Performance Companies bought OptiGraphics after Pinnacle Trading Card Company went bankrupt in 1998.

While lenticular images were popular in the 1960s and 1970s, by the 1980s OptiGraphics was the only significant manufacturer remaining in the US.

==== 21st century ====
The techniques for lenticular printing were further improved in the 21st century. Lenticular full motion video effects or "motion print" enabled viewing of up to 60 video frames within a print.

== Common and notable products ==
=== Political campaign and pop star "flasher" badges ===
After their first presidential campaign badge I like Ike in 1952, Pictorial Productions Inc. made many more similar political campaign buttons, including presidential campaign badge like Don't blame me! – I voted democratic (1956), John F. Kennedy – The Man for the 60s (1960), I Like Ben (1963) and I'm for Nixon (1968?).

Official "flasher" badges for pop stars like Elvis Presley were manufactured by Vari-Vue at least since 1956, including badges for Beatles, Rolling Stones' and other bands in the 1960s.

=== Cheerios and Cracker Jack prizes ===
Pictorial Productions/Vari-Vue produced small animated picture cards for Cheerios in the 1950s, of which founder Victor Anderson claimed to have produced 40 million. He also stated that the cards were originally stuck to the outside of the packaging and were put inside the boxes only after too many cards were stolen before the boxes reached the store shelves.

Many different lenticular "tilt cards" were produced as prizes in Cracker Jack boxes. These were first produced by Vari-Vue (1950s-1970s), later by Toppan Printing, Ltd. (1980s), and Optigraphics Corporation (1980s-1990s).

=== Novelty toys ===
In 1958 Victor Anderson patented an Ocular Toy: an eye glass mount with lenticular winking eyes.

Lenticular images were used in many small and cheap plastic toys, often as gumball machine prizes. These include: miniature toy televisions with an animated lenticular screen, charms in the shape of animals with lenticular faces, "flicker rings", etc.

In 1960 Takara's Dakkochan – a little plastic golliwog toy with lenticular eyes – originally intended for toddlers, became popular with Japanese teenagers as a fashion accessory worn around the arm.

=== Postcards ===
Around 1966 several companies started producing lenticular postcards. Common themes are winking girls, religious scenes, animals, dioramas with dolls, touristic sites and pin-up models wearing clothes when viewed from one angle and nude when viewed from another angle.

=== Covers for books, music albums and movies ===
The lenticular picture on the album cover for the Rolling Stones' 1967 LP Their Satanic Majesties Request was manufactured by Vari-Vue, as well as the postcards and other promotional items that accompanied the release. Other lenticular LP covers include Johnny Cash's The Holy Land (1969) and The Stranglers' The Raven (1979). In the 2010s lenticular covers for LPs became a bit more common, especially for deluxe re-releases.

Saturnalia 1973 LP with lenticular label that switches from "Magical love" to a logo.

In 1973, the band Saturnalia had lenticular labels on their Magical Love picture disc LP.

From around the mid-1990s some lenticular CD covers were produced (mostly for limited editions), including Pet Shop Boys' Alternative (1995) with an image of Chris changing into Neil, the Supersuckers' The Sacrilicious Sounds of the Supersuckers (1995), Download's Furnace album (1995) and Microscopic EP (1996), Tool's Ænima (1996), The Wildhearts' Fishing for Luckies (1996), Kylie Minogue's Impossible Princess (1997), the Velvet Underground's Loaded 2CD version (1997), Kraftwerk's "Expo 2000" (1999) and David Bowie's Hours (1999). Ministry's The Last Sucker album (2007) had an image of George W. Bush changing into a monstrous, alien-like face. In 1996, alternative rock band Garbage produced a 7" vinyl with a lenticular cover for their "Milk" single release.

In the 2010s, lenticular covers for movies on DVD and Blu-ray became quite common.

Lenticular covers have also been used as a collectible cover variant for comic books since the 1990s; Marvel, DC, and other publishers have created such covers with animated or 3D effects.

=== Lentograph ===
In August 1967 the trademark Lentograph was filed by Victor Anderson 3D Studios, Inc. (registered in October 1968). Lentographs were marketed as relatively large lenticular plates (16 x 12 inches / 12 × 8 inches), often found in an illuminated brass frame. Commonly found are 3D pictures of Paul Cunningham's biblical displays with sculpted figurines in dramatic poses based on paintings (Plate 501–508), a family of teddy bears in a domestic scene, Plate No. 106 Evening Flowers, Plate No. 115 Goldilocks and 3 bears, Plate No. 124 Bijou (a white poodle), Plate No. 121 Midday Respite (a taxidermied young deer in a forest setting), Plate No. 213 Red Riding Hood. Also known are a harbor scene (Plate No. 114), Plate No. 118 Japanese Floral, Plate No. 123 Faustus (a Yorkie dog) and Plate No. 212 of a covered bridge.

=== Lenticular postage stamps ===
In 1967 Bhutan introduced lenticular 3D postage stamps as one of the many unusual stamp designs of the Bhutan Stamp Agency initiated by American businessman Burt Kerr Todd. Countries like Ajman, Yemen, Manama, Umm Al Qiwain and North Korea released lenticular stamps in the 1970s. Animated lenticular stamps have been issued since the early 1980s by countries like North Korea.

In 2004 full motion lenticular postage stamps were issued in New Zealand. Over the years many other countries have produced stamps with similar lenticular full motion effects, mostly depicting sport events. In 2010 Communications agency KesselsKramer produced the "Smallest Shortest Film" on a Dutch stamp, directed by Anton Corbijn and featuring actress Carice van Houten.

In 2012, Design Consultancy GBH.London created the UK's first 'Motion Stamps' for Royal Mail's Special Stamp Issue, The Genius of Gerry Anderson. The minisheet featured four fully lenticular stamps based on Gerry and Sylvia Anderson's Thunderbirds TV series. The Stamps and their background border used 48 frame 'MotionPrint’ technology and were produced by Outer Aspect from New Zealand.

In August 2018 the United States Postal Service introduced "The Art of Magic" lenticular stamp, sold in a souvenir sheet of three. The stamp was designed to celebrate the art of magic and "by rotating each stamp, you can see a white rabbit popping out of a black top hat."

In August 2019 the United States Postal Service introduced a second stamp with lenticular technology, this time featuring the dinosaur Tyrannosaurus Rex. The USPS explained that "two of the four designs show movement when rotated. See the skeletal remains with and without flesh and watch as an approaching T. rex suddenly lunges forward."

=== Books ===
In 2012, Dan Kainen's first "photicular" book Safari was published, with processed video images animated by having a lens sheet slide by turning the page, much like Rufus Butler Seder's "scanimation" process. It was followed by Ocean (2014), Polar (2015), Jungle (2016), Wild (2017), Dinosaur (2018) and Outback (2019).

=== Posters ===
In 2013, the Spanish ANAR Foundation (Aid to Children and Adolescents at Risk) released a lenticular poster with the image of a battered child and in Spanish, "If somebody hurts you, phone us and we'll help you," and a helpline number, visible only from the viewpoint of an average 10-year-old. People over 4'5" tall see an uninjured face and in Spanish, "Sometimes, child abuse is visible only to the child suffering it." The organisation claimed that an accompanying adult may dissuade an abused child from seeking help if the hidden message could be seen by the adult. Poster was printed by Lentimax

== Related techniques ==
Han-O-Disc manufactured for Light Fantastic with metal flake outside and Dufex process print within.

Han-O-Disc record with diffraction grating 'Rainbow' film (outside ring), color shifting Rowlux (middle ring) and "silver balls" Rowlux film (center of record).

A related product, produced by a small company in New Jersey, was Rowlux. Unlike the Vari-Vue product, Rowlux used a microprismatic lens structure made by a process they patented in 1972, and no paper print. Instead, the plastic (polycarbonate, flexible PVC and later PETG) was dyed with translucent colors, and the film was usually thin and flexible (from 0.002" or 0.051 mm in thickness).

While not a true lenticular process, the Dufex Process (manufactured by F.J. Warren Ltd.) does use a form of lens structure to animate the image. The process consists of imprinting a metallic foil with an image. The foil is then laminated onto a thin sheet of card stock that has been coated with a thick layer of wax. The heated lamination press has the Dufex embossing plate on its upper platen, which has been engraved with 'lenses' at different angles, designed to match the artwork and reflect light at different intensities depending on angle of view.

== Lenticular cinema and television ==
Since at least the early 1930s many researchers have tried to develop lenticular cinema. Herbert E. Ives presented an apparatus on 31 October 1930 with small autostereoscopic motion pictures viewable only by small groups at a time. Ives would continue to improve his system over the years. However, producing autostereoscopic movies was deemed too costly for commercial purposes. A November 1931 New York Times article entitled New screens gives depth to movies describes a lenticular system by Douglas F. Winnek and also mentions an optical appliance fitted near the screen by South African astronomer R.T.A. Innes.

Lenticular arrays have also been used for 3D autostereoscopic television, which produces the illusion of 3D vision without the use of special glasses. At least as early as 1954 patents for lenticular television were filed, but it lasted until 2010 before a range of 3D televisions became available. Some of these systems used cylindrical lenses slanted from the vertical, or spherical lenses arranged in a honeycomb pattern, to provide a better resolution. While over 40 million 3D televisions were sold in 2012 (including systems that required glasses), by 2016 3D content became rare and manufacturers had stopped producing 3D TV sets. While the need to wear glasses for the more affordable systems seemed to have been a letdown for customers, affordable autostereoscopic televisions were seen as a future solution.

== Manufacturing process ==
=== Printing ===
Lenticular front sheeting and image-processing software are both sold for home computer printing, where the interlaced image backing is inkjet printed in photo resolution and affixed behind the lenticular sheet.

Creation of lenticular images on a commercial scale requires printing presses that are adapted to print on sensitive thermoplastic materials. Lithographic offset printing is typically used, to ensure the images are good quality. Printing presses for lenticulars must be capable of adjusting image placement in 10-μm steps, to allow good alignment of the image to the lens array.

Typically, ultraviolet-cured inks are used. These dry quickly by direct conversion of the liquid ink to a solid form, rather than by evaporation of liquid solvents from a mixture. Powerful (400-watt-per-square-inch or 0.083 hp/cm^{2}) ultraviolet (UV) lamps have been used to rapidly cure the ink. This allowed lenticular images to be printed at high speed.

In some cases, electron beam lithography has been used instead. The curing of the ink was then initiated directly by an electron beam scanned across the surface.

=== Defects ===
==== Design defects ====
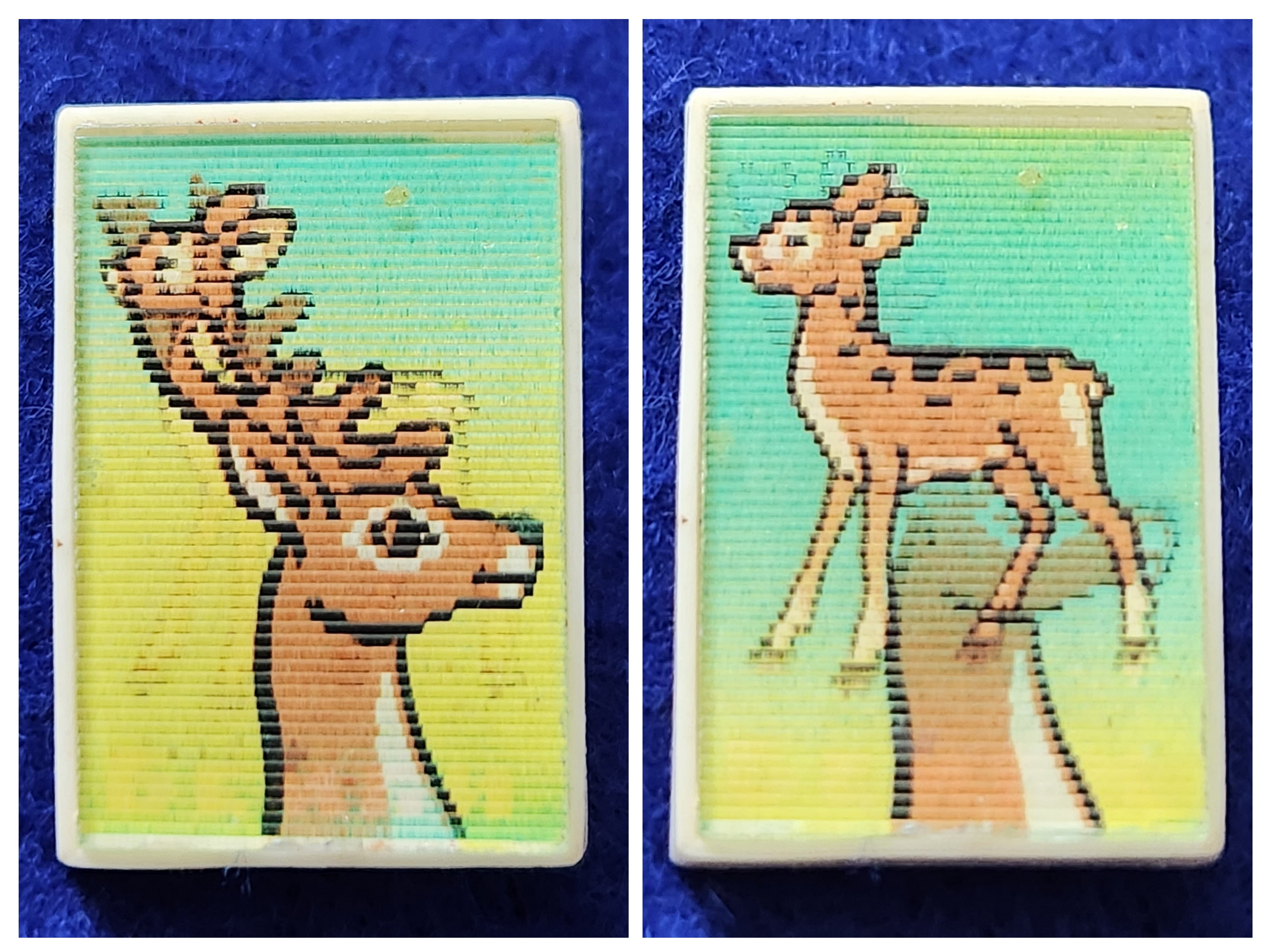
Lenticular print showing double images and ghosting

Double images on the relief and in depth

Double images are usually caused by an exaggeration of the 3D effect from some angles of view, or an insufficient number of frames. Poor design can lead to doubling, small jumps, or a fuzzy image, especially on objects in relief or in depth. For some visuals, where the foreground and background are fuzzy or shaded, this exaggeration can prove to be an advantage. In most cases, the detail and precision required do not allow this.

Image ghosting

Ghosting occurs due to poor treatment of the source images, and also due to transitions where demand for an effect goes beyond the limits and technical possibilities of the system. This causes some of the images to remain visible when they should disappear. These effects can depend on the lighting of the lenticular print.

==== Prepress defects ====
Synchronization of the print (master) with the pitch

This effect is also known as "banding". Poor calibration of the material can cause the passage from one image to another to not be simultaneous over the entire print. The image transition progresses from one side of the print to the other, giving the impression of a veil or curtain crossing the visual. This phenomenon is felt less for the 3D effects, but is manifested by a jump of the transverse image. In some cases, the transition starts in several places and progresses from each starting point toward the next, giving the impression of several curtains crossing the visual, as described above.

Discordant harmonics

This phenomenon is unfortunately common, and is explained either by incorrect calibration of the support or by incorrect parametrization of the prepress operations. It is manifested in particular by streaks that appear parallel to the lenticules during transitions from one visual to the other.

==== Printing defects ====
Color synchronization

One of the main difficulties in lenticular printing is color synchronization. The causes are varied, they may come from a malleable material, incorrect printing conditions and adjustments, or again a dimensional differential of the engraving of the offset plates in each color.

This poor marking is shown by doubling of the visual; a lack of clarity; a streak of color or wavy colors (especially for four-color shades) during a change of phase by inclination of the visual.

Synchronization of parallelism of the printing to the lenticules

The origin of this problem is a fault in the printing and forcibly generates a phase defect. The passage from one visual to another must be simultaneous over the entire format. But when this problem occurs, there is a lag in the effects on the diagonals. At the end of one diagonal of the visual, there is one effect, and at the other end, there is another.

Phasing

In most cases, the phasing problem comes from imprecise cutting of the material, as explained below. Nevertheless, poor printing and rectification conditions may also be behind it.

In theory, for a given angle of observation, one and the same visual must appear, for the entire batch. As a general rule, the angle of vision is around 45°, and this angle must be in agreement with the sequence provided by the master. If the images have a tendency to double perpendicularly (for 3D) or if the images provided for observation to the left appear to the right (top/bottom), then there is a phasing problem.

==== Cutting defects ====
Defects, in the way the lenticular lens has been cut, can lead to phase errors between the lens and the image.

Two examples, taken from the same production batch:

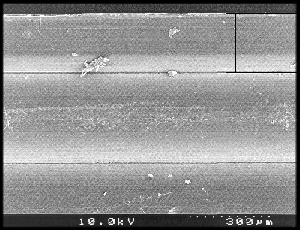
First image

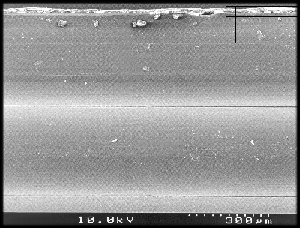
Second image

The first image shows a cut that removed about 150 μm of the first lens, and that shows irregular cutting of the lenticular lenses. The second image shows a cut that removed about 30 μm of the first lens. Defects in cutting such as these lead to a serious phase problem. In the printing press the image being printed is aligned relative to the edges of the sheet of material. If the sheet is not always cut in the same place relative to the first lenticule, a phase error is introduced between the lenses and the image slices.

== See also ==
- Autostereoscopy, any method of displaying stereoscopic images without the use of glasses
- Integral imaging, a broader concept that includes lenticular printing
- Lenticular lens, the technology used in lenticular printing and for 3D displays
- Parallax barrier, another technology for displaying stereoscopic images without the use of glasses
- Holography, a technique for recording and reconstructing 3D images on a 2D medium.
