= Lenticular =

Lenticular is an adjective often relating to lenses. It may refer to:

- A term used with two meanings in botany: see Glossary of botanical terms § lenticular
- Lenticular cloud, a lens-shaped cloud
- Lenticular galaxy, a lens-shaped galaxy
- Lenticular (geology), adjective describing a formation with a lens-shaped cross-section
- Lenticular nucleus, a lens-shaped nucleus in the brain
- Lenticular lens, a technology for making moving or 3D images
  - Lenticular printing, a technology in which lenticular lenses are used in printing specifically
- Lenticular truss bridges, a bridge with a lens-shape truss
