= Motherfuckers Be Trippin' =

Studio album by Supersuckers
- Released: April 22, 2003
- Studio: Litho, Seattle, Washington
- Genre: Rock
- Length: 50:23
- Label: Mid-Fi
- Producer: Eddie Spaghetti, Supersuckers

Supersuckers chronology
Splitsville 1 (2002)	Motherfuckers Be Trippin' (2003)	Live at the Magic Bag (2004)

Professional ratings
Review scores
Source	Rating
AllMusic	4/5 stars
Robert Christgau	(choice cut)
PopMatters	(favorable)
Prefix Magazine	7/10
Rolling Stone	3/5 stars

Motherfuckers Be Trippin' is a studio album by American rock band Supersuckers. It was released on April 22, 2003, on the band's own label, Mid-Fi Recordings.

The album's title comes from the name jokingly announced by the New Bomb Turks as the title of their upcoming album while on tour with Supersuckers. When the Supersuckers went into the studio to record their next album, they put it down as a working title as an inside joke.

== Track listing ==
1. "Rock 'n' Roll Records (Ain't Selling This Year)" – 2:25
2. "Rock Your Ass" – 2:39
3. "Pretty Fucked Up" – 2:52
4. "The Fight Song" – 3:40
5. "Bruises to Prove It" – 3:26
6. "Bubblegum and Beer" – 3:18
7. "Sleepy Vampire" – 3:36
8. "A Good Night for My Drinkin'" – 2:34
9. "Damn My Soul" – 2:28
10. "Someday I Will Kill You" – 2:35
11. "The Nowhere Special" – 2:43
12. "Goodbye" – 14:08
