= Splitsville =

Splitsville may refer to:

- "Splitsville" (How I Met Your Mother), 2012 television episode
- Splitsville (film), 2025 film
- Splitsville, Canadian subsidiary of Hollywood Bowl Group

== See also ==
- Splitsville 1, a split album by Supersuckers and Electric Frankenstein
