= Devil's Food =

Compilation album by Supersuckers
- Released: April 5, 2005
- Genre: Rock
- Label: Mid-Fi Recordings

Supersuckers chronology
Live at the Tractor Tavern (2004)	Devil's Food (2005)

Professional ratings
Review scores
Source	Rating
AllMusic	3.5/5 stars

Devil's Food is a singles compilation by American rock band Supersuckers. It was released in April 2005 on Mid-Fi records.

== Track listing ==
1. "Gato Negro"
2. "Shake It Off"
3. "Hey Ya"
4. "Teenage Shutdown"
5. "Doublewide" (country version)
6. "Team Man"
7. "Can Pipe"
8. "Rubber Biscuit"
9. "Born with a Tail" (country version)
10. "Devil's Food"
11. "Sail On"
12. "Kid's Got It Comin'"
13. "Eastbound & Down"
14. "Then I'm Gone"
15. "Flyin' Into the Mid-Day Sun"
16. "End of an Era"

== Notes ==
- "Gato Negro" originally appeared on a split single with the band Zeke.
- "Hey Ya" is a cover of the song by OutKast.
- "Teenage Shutdown" is a cover of the song by Electric Frankenstein, originally appearing on Splitsville 1.
- "Rubber Biscuit" is a cover of the song by The Chips.
- "Sail On" is a cover of the song by The Commodores.
- "Eastbound & Down" is a cover of the Jerry Reed song "East Bound and Down" originally written for the movie Smokey and the Bandit.
- "Doublewide" and "Born With a Tail" are country versions of songs originally appearing on the band's 1995 Sub Pop album, The Sacrilicious Sounds of the Supersuckers.
