= Devil's Food (disambiguation) =

Devil's Food is a compilation album by Supersuckers.

Devil's Food may also refer to:

- Devil's food cake
- Devil's Food (novel)
- "Devil's Food", a song from Welcome to My Nightmare
- "Devil's Food", a song from Alive in an Ultra World
