= House at 288 Wimbledon Road =

Historic house in New York, United States

- U.S. National Register of Historic Places
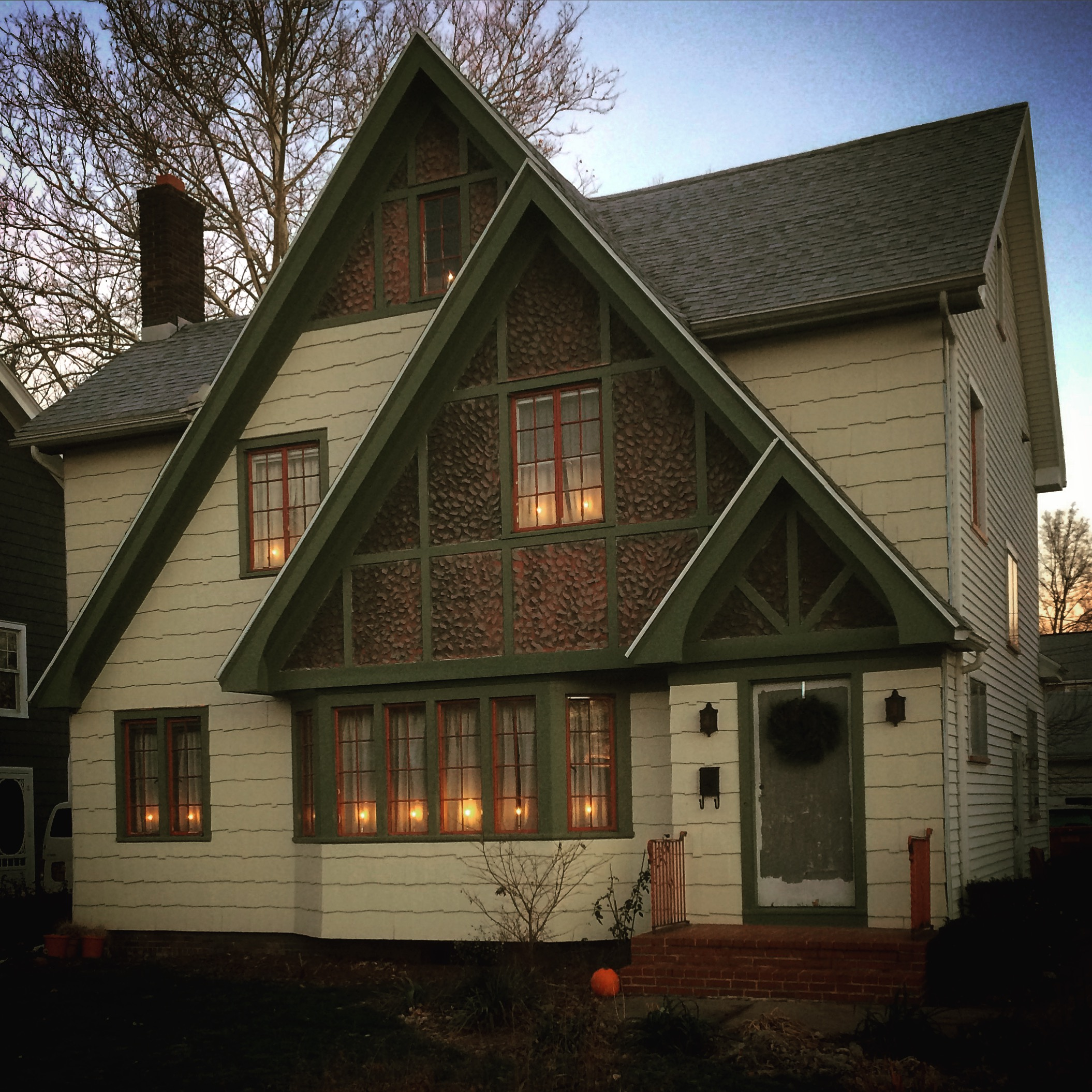

- Location within New York Location within the United States
- Location: 288 Wimbledon Road., Irondequoit, New York
- Coordinates: 43°12′18″N 77°36′36″W
- Area: 0.13 acres (0.053 ha)
- Built: 1927-1928
- Architectural style: Tudor Revival
- NRHP reference No.: 15000822
- Added to NRHP: November 24, 2015

288 Wimbledon Road is an historic house located in Irondequoit in Monroe County, New York.

== Description and history ==
The building was constructed in 1928 by Fred P. Tosch Inc. as the Democrat & Chronicle's Master Model Home. The house was cosponsored and promoted by the Democrat & Chronicle and The Home Owner's Service Institute as an all-encompassing demonstration house used to promote high quality design and cutting edge products to middle income families as part of the nationwide Better Homes Movement occurring during the 1920s. It is a 2 1/2-story building executed in the Tudor Revival style. The primary facade features a distinctive composition of three asymmetrically concentric gables with gridded false timbering and tinted stucco panels atop a large bay window.

Of particular note was the use of early experimental Kodacolor motion picture film to document the process of construction. The captured moments were organized into a brief presentation for the public who visited the home during its four-week open house.

It was listed on the National Register of Historic Places on November 24, 2015.
