= Via Mizner =

- U.S. National Register of Historic Places
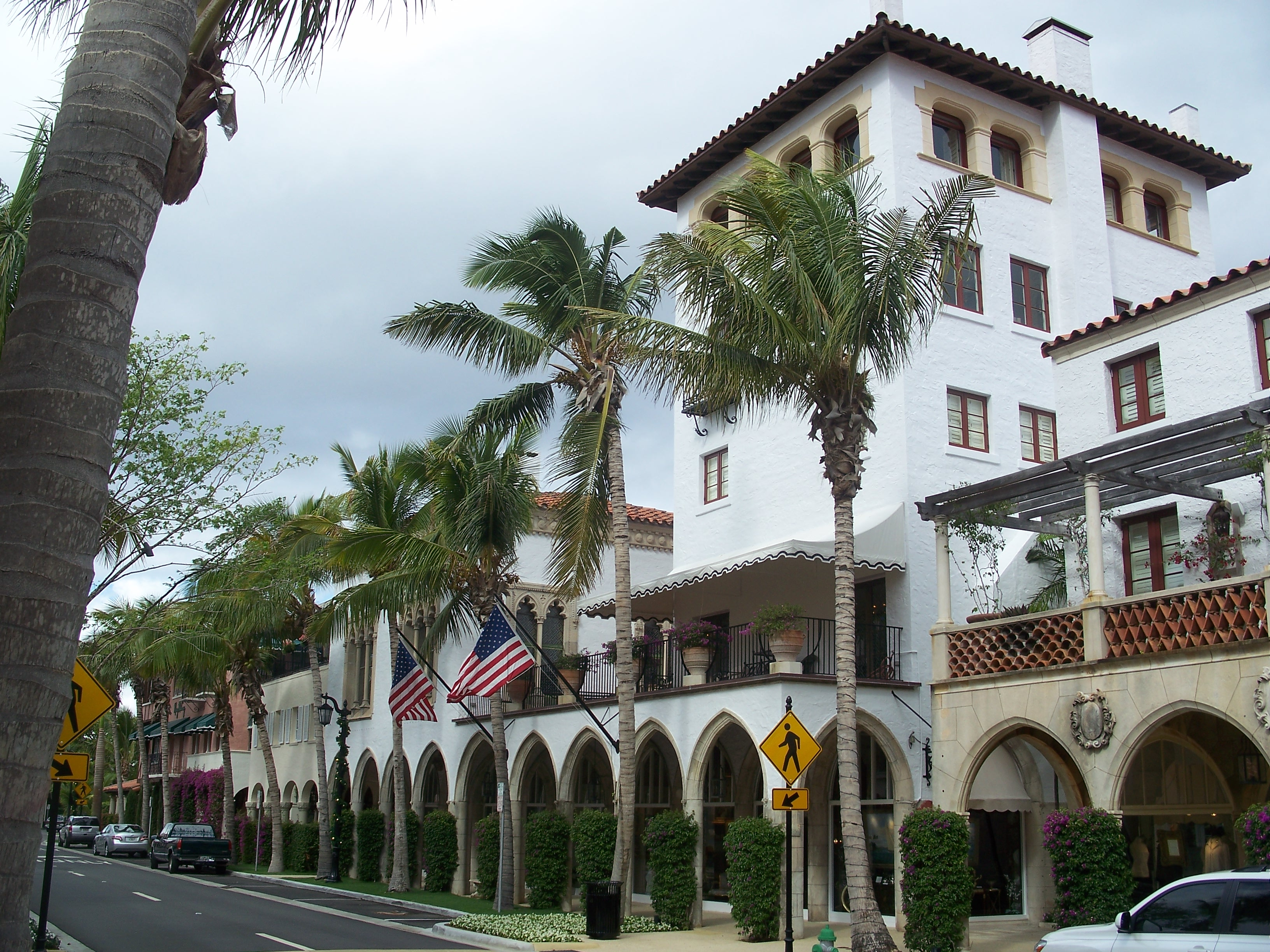

- Location within Florida Location within the United States
- Location: Palm Beach, Florida
- Coordinates: 26°42′4″N 80°2′26″W
- Architectural style: Mission/Spanish Revival
- NRHP reference No.: 93000256
- Added to NRHP: April 1, 1993

The Via Mizner is a historic site in Palm Beach, Florida. It is located at 337–339 Worth Avenue. On April 1, 1993, it was added to the U.S. National Register of Historic Places.

A “via” is derived from the Latin word meaning “way” or “path” and is defined by the World English Dictionary as a “way, road, channel, course of uncertain origin.”

Via Mizner meanders approximately 85 yards (78 m) and connects Palm Beach's premier shopping street, Worth Avenue, to Peruvian Avenue, one city block to the north. The Via was created by the eccentric, visionary architect, Addison Mizner in 1923 after he had completed the Everglades Club (1918), his first major project in Palm Beach, Florida. Via Mizner is located across Worth Avenue from the-still exclusive club. Caroline Seebohm, author of Boca Rococo, How Addison Mizner Invented Florida's Gold Coast, explains a via as follows: "Medieval Spanish castles had contained within their fortified walls what might be called 'inner cities,' where the soldiers and castle employees lived and worked. These walled urban areas were later transformed into commercial spaces." Addison Mizner added: "They (the commercial spaces) usually faced on small winding streets and were entirely open to the people who traversed the narrow pathways."

It was in this spirit that Mizner set out to create Via Mizner. The result is a European-type, pedestrian village with complex and irregular buildings that house shops, offices and residences. Via Mizner (and adjacent Via Parigi) is a combination of Mediterranean Revival and Spanish Colonial Revival architecture mixed with a touch of old Venice, adapted to South Florida's tropical climate. The roofs are terracotta barrel tiles while the white stucco walls are punctuated with numerous, irregular shaped windows, wooden balconies, pecky-cypress accents and balustrades, many with decorative ironwork details. The staircases leading up to the residential units have risers made of colorful ceramic tiles while occasional palm trees remind us of the tropical setting.

Via Mizner's combination of architectural styles and decorative detail quickly became Palm Beach's signature look. As the decades passed, countless architects, city planners and designers have copied Mizner's unique design, which can be identified throughout Florida today.

Via Mizner houses twenty well-known shops and businesses as well as a small number of residential apartments. The most famed address is 1, Via Mizner, the architect's own majestic, five-story, tower-like residence called Villa Mizner. The history of this residence is chronicled in Richard René Silvin's book Villa Mizner: The House that Changed Palm Beach (2014). The architect designed the top floor as a single room, which he used as his office. Sixteen windows span the four sides of his office-floor and overlook the entire island of Palm Beach. Mizner's pet monkey, Johnny Brown, is buried at the foot of the home's 35-by-40 foot living room.
