= Get It Together (album) =

Studio album by The Supersuckers
- Released: November 25, 2008
- Studio: Robert Lang Studios, Shoreline, Washington
- Genre: Rock and roll
- Label: Mid-Fi Records
- Producer: Billy Joe Bowers

The Supersuckers chronology
Paid (2006)	Get It Together (2008)	Get the Hell (2014)

Professional ratings
Review scores
Source	Rating
AllMusic	4/5 stars

Get It Together is a studio album by American rock band The Supersuckers. It was released on November 25, 2008, by Mid-Fi Records on Compact Disc, vinyl record. Some copies were released with an additional DVD that included a live performance at the House of Blues in Anaheim, California, on September 19, 2007.

== Track listing ==
1. "What It Takes" – 3:45
2. "Anything Else" – 3:00
3. "Listen Up" – 3:20
4. "Paid" – 4:11
5. "She Is Leaving" – 3:40
6. "When I Go, I'm Gone" – 3:13
7. "I'm a Fucking Genius" – 1:53
8. "Sunset on Sunday" – 3:16
9. "Breaking Honey's Heart" – 3:12
10. "Something Good for You" – 4:15
11. "I Like It All, Man" – 1:37
12. "Come Along for the Ride" – 2:50

== Personnel ==
- Dan Bolton – bass, guitar (electric), vocals
- Billy Joe Bowers – percussion, vocals (background)
- Scott Churilla – drums
- David Fisher – vocals (background)
- Rontrose Heathman – guitar (acoustic), guitar (electric), vocals
- Mike Musburger – drums
- Mickey Raphael – harmonica
- Eddie Spaghetti – bass, guitar (acoustic), vocals

=== Recording and production ===
- Billy Joe Bowers – producer
- Jessika Daly – composer
- Tim Gabor – art direction, illustrations
- Eddie Spaghetti – liner notes
