= The Smoke of Hell =

Studio album by the Supersuckers
- Released: September 1, 1992
- Studio: Word of Mouth (Seattle, Washington); Avast! (Seattle, Washington)
- Genre: Punk rock
- Length: 27:37
- Label: Sub Pop
- Producer: Jack Endino

The Supersuckers chronology
The Songs All Sound the Same (1992)	The Smoke of Hell (1992)	La Mano Cornuda (1994)

The Smoke of Hell is the debut studio album by the American rock band the Supersuckers. It was released on September 1, 1992, on Sub Pop records. The cover art is by the comic book artist Daniel Clowes.

== Critical reception ==
Professional ratings
Review scores
Source	Rating
AllMusic	3/5 stars

The Washington Post wrote that the music "is basic punk—sloppy, speedy rock 'n' roll in the manner of such bands as the New York Dolls or the Heartbreakers."

== Track listing ==
1. "Coattail Rider"
2. "Luck"
3. "I Say Fuck"
4. "Alone and Stinking"
5. "Caliente"
6. "Tasty Greens"
7. "Hell City, Hell"
8. "Hot Rod Rally"
9. "Drink and Complain"
10. "Mighty Joe Young"
11. "Ron's Got the Cocaine"
12. "Sweet 'n' Sour Jesus"
13. "Retarded Bill"
14. "Thinkin' 'bout Revenge"
