= The Evil Powers of Rock 'n' Roll =

The Evil Powers of Rock 'N' Roll

Studio album by Supersuckers
- Released: November 16, 1999
- Studio: Litho, Seattle, Washington
- Genre: Rock and roll, punk rock
- Length: 35:07
- Label: Koch
- Producer: Kurt Bloch

Supersuckers chronology
How The Supersuckers Became the Greatest Rock and Roll Band in the World (1999)	The Evil Powers of Rock 'N' Roll (1999)	Splitsville 1 (2002)

The Evil Powers of Rock 'n' Roll is a studio album by the American rock band Supersuckers. It was released on October 19, 1999, on Koch Records.

== Production ==
The album was produced by Kurt Bloch. The band recorded the album twice, releasing the rerecorded version after Interscope refused to put out the original one.

== Critical reception ==
Professional ratings
Review scores
Source	Rating
AllMusic	3/5 stars
Kerrang!	5/5 stars
NME	4/5 stars

The Guardian thought that "all of its songs sound like they're being played on the back of a speeding Harley Davidson on its way to ramraid the neighbourhood drugstore."

== Track listing ==
1. "The Evil Powers of Rock 'n' Roll" – 3:05
2. "Cool Manchu" – 3:06
3. "I Want the Drugs" – 1:21
4. "Santa Rita High" – 2:56
5. "Dead Meat" – 1:59
6. "Stuff 'n' Nonsense" – 2:35
7. "Dirt Roads, Dead Ends and Dust" – 3:44
8. "Fisticuffs" – 2:32
9. "Gone Gamblin'" – 2:24
10. "My Kickass Life" – 2:17
11. "Goin' Back to Tucson" – 2:20
12. "I Can't Hold Myself in Line" – 1:46
13. "Hot Like the Sun" – 5:04

== Notes ==
- "I Can't Hold Myself in Line" is a cover of a Merle Haggard song.
