= Get the Hell =

Studio album by the Supersuckers
- Released: January 14, 2014
- Genre: Rock and roll
- Label: Acetate Records
- Producer: Jeff Hanzlik & The Supersuckers

The Supersuckers chronology
| Get It Together (2008) | Get the Hell (2014) | Holdin' the Bag (2015) |

Professional ratings
Review scores
| Source | Rating |
|---|---|
| AllMusic | 3.5/5 stars |

Get the Hell is a studio album by American rock band the Supersuckers. It was released on January 14, 2014, on Acetate Records.

== Track listing ==
1. "Get the Hell"
2. "Something About You"
3. "Fuck Up"
4. "High Tonight"
5. "Pushin' Thru"
6. "Never Let Me Down Again"
7. "Gluttonous"
8. "Disaster Bastard"
9. "Bein' Bad"
10. "That's What You Get for Thinking"
11. "Shut Your Face"
12. "Rock On"
