= Myodisc =

A myodisc or myopic disk is a corrective lens with a steep concave curvature that is fitted on the posterior surface of a carrier lens, or a high power single-vision lens specially ordered with slab-off the edge, creating a central prescription disc. These are used for correction of extremely high myopia often seen in low vision patients. Myodiscs are not a preferred lens type, but are the least expensive option among available lenses fitted for minus powers beyond -12 diopters. They are cheap to produce but cause scotoma, a ringed blind spot. As a result, most practitioners encourage using other lens styles.

The myodisc has been categorized as a lenticular lens. These are rarely prescribed sets of specialty lenses used in cases of extremely poor vision, or near blindness. The lenticular subrogate nomenclature has been extensively used in ophthalmology, requiring scope of context. Newer lens products can also be found using vague terminology. Low vision clinics in under-privileged cost-reducing centers list the myodisc for correction of high myopia.

Another factor is spectacle frame selection. Large eyesize fashion frames are impractical. Lens box diagrams used in dispensing should consider edge thickness, reduced by smaller eyesizes, and oval/circular shapes. The bridge should be fitted to increase surface contact using rigid nose support if possible. Weight problems associated with these lenses are often not anticipated by untrained dispensaries, and end products are disappointing after inclusion of special instructions to fabricating labs.

In some cases, more aesthetic aspheric lens designs can be fitted, reducing Scotoma associated with lenticulars.
