= Richard René Silvin =

American author and lecturer

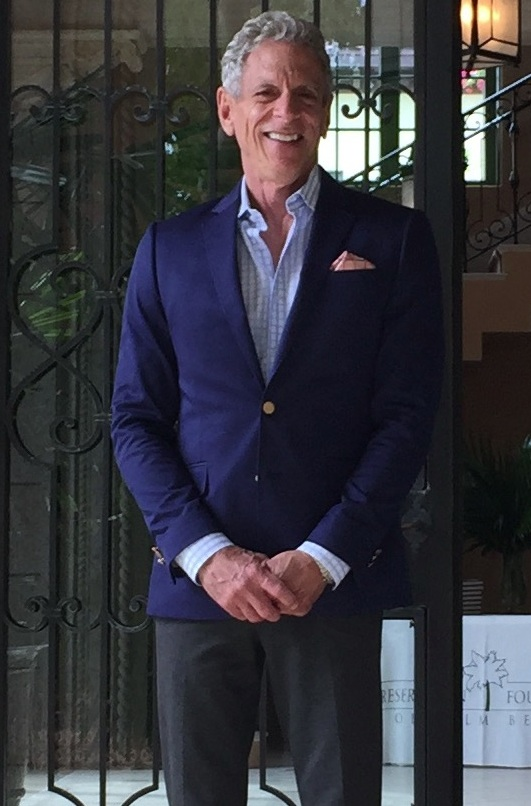
- Rene Silvin in Palm Beach, 2016
- Born: May 16, 1948 (age 78); Bay Shore, New York, U.S.
- Education: Institut Le Rosey; Georgetown University (BS); Cornell University (MBA)
- Occupations: Author and lecturer
- Website: www.rrsilvin.com

Richard René Silvin (born May 16, 1948) is an American retired corporate executive, turned author and lecturer, who is best known as an expert on Wallis Simpson, the Duchess of Windsor, Palm Beach society architect, Addison Mizner, the 1930s French Line flagship, SS Normandie, and the history of Mar-a-Lago.

== Early life ==
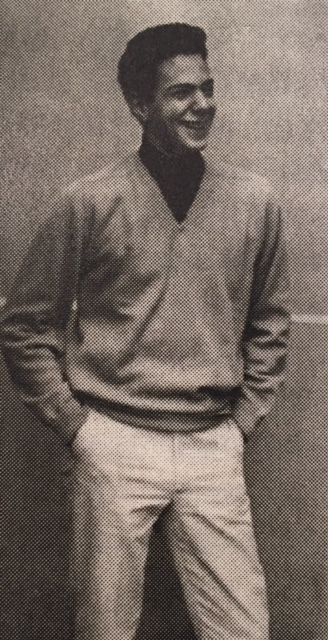
Richard René Silvin at Le Rosey in 1966

Silvin was born in Bay Shore, New York to an American mother and a French father. His grandfather, Léon Silvin, partnered with Albert Keller-Dorian, invented Keller-Dorian cinematography. They received 38 patents, including the development of aluminum foil and cellophane.

During the first six years of his life Silvin spent most of his time in Islip, Long Island, NY living with a nanny, Mary "Nonnie" Lee, while his parents were mostly in France. At age seven he went to Swiss boarding schools; first to La Clairière in Villars-Sur-Ollon (1955–1958), Switzerland, and then to Institut Le Rosey in Rolle and Gstaad, Switzerland, (1958–1966). At Le Rosey, Silvin both rowed and coached the younger rowing team. His team went on to become National Swiss Champions in 1966, a feat no school had ever achieved.

== Career ==
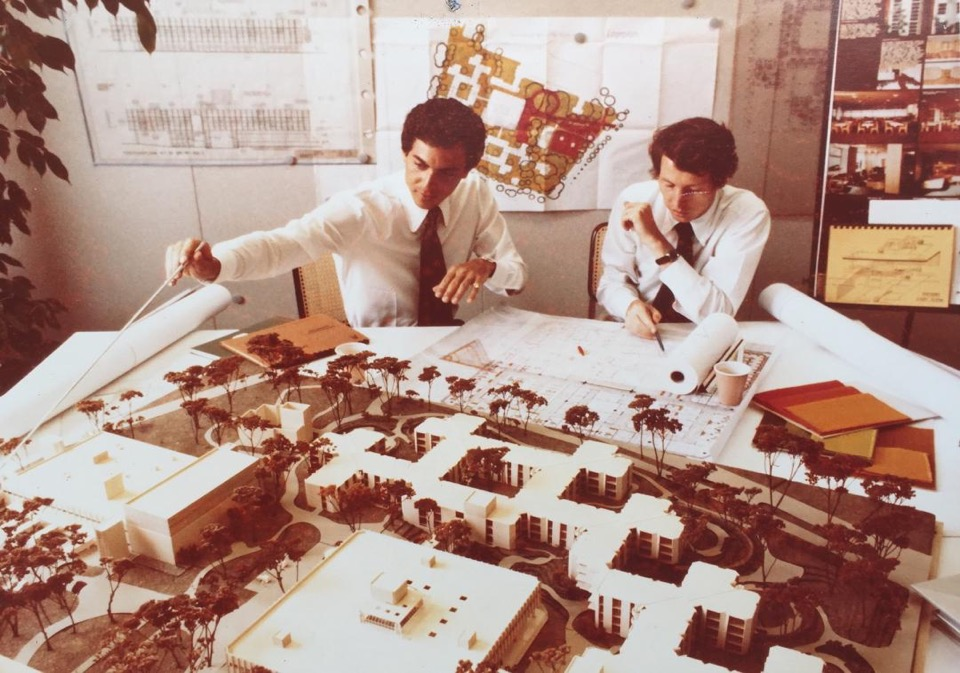
Richard René Silvin working on the University of Bonn psychiatric hospital in 1975

In 1966 Silvin moved back to the United States to attend college. He earned a BS from Georgetown University in 1970, and an MBA in both Finance and Hospital Administration from Cornell University in 1972. He worked at Friesen International, a hospital design and management consulting firm in Washington, DC from 1972 until it was acquired by American Medical International, Inc. (NYSE: AMI) in 1976. He rose to the head of the International Division of AMI, which owned and operated thirty hospitals in ten foreign countries. In 1990 AMI sold its Swiss hospital group to Union Bank of Switzerland's Hirslanden Private Hospital Group. Subsequently, Hirslanden Group was acquired by South Africa's Medi-Clinic for $2.36B.

=== Author ===
After retiring from the hospital industry in 1998, Silvin started writing. He published I Survived Swiss Boarding Schools: An Arc To Triumph in 2006. The book received notoriety among Le Rosey alumni. Silvin's second book, Walking the Rainbow: An Arc To Triumph was published in 2008, was also autobiographical, and it chronicled the AIDS crisis. At the same time he published three article for the XVII International AIDS Conference, 2008 in Mexico city. All three comprise the history of AIDS up to 2008. Silvin's third book, Noblesse Oblige: The Duchess of Windsor As I Knew Her, was published in 2010, recounting Silvin's encounters with the widowed Duchess of Windsor, the former Wallis Simpson.

In 2014 Silvin published his first coffee table book: "Villa Mizner-The House That Changed Palm Beach". The book explores the life and work of architect Addison Mizner, who was responsible for creating the Mediterranean Revival look in South Florida, including Via Mizner and the other vias around Worth Avenue in Palm Beach.

Silvin founded Silvin Books LLC in 2015, a full-service publishing company, and released a second coffee table book in 2016. Normandie: The Tragic Story of The Most Majestic Ocean Liner details the building of the French Line's magnificent Art Deco flagship, its four-year active working life, and its sinking in New York City in 1942, when she was being converted to serve as America's only large troop carrier.

In 2017 Silvin Books was renamed Silvin Books & Productions, and expanded into publishing other authors' works, as well as assisting clients in creating and presenting lectures. Silvin Books & Productions then released the second edition of Silvin's book Noblesse Oblige, the Duchess of Windsor As I Knew Her in November 2017. In the fall of 2018 Silvin Books & Productions released the second edition of I Survived Swiss Boarding Schools, now with the new subtitle: all that glitters is not gold, which chronicles his time at Le Rosey in the 50s and 60s.The book once again received notoriety among Le Rosey alumni. A year later, in the fall of 2019, Silvin Books & Productions released the second edition of Silvin's second book, now titled Walking the Rainbow, all that glitters is not gold.

=== Speaker ===
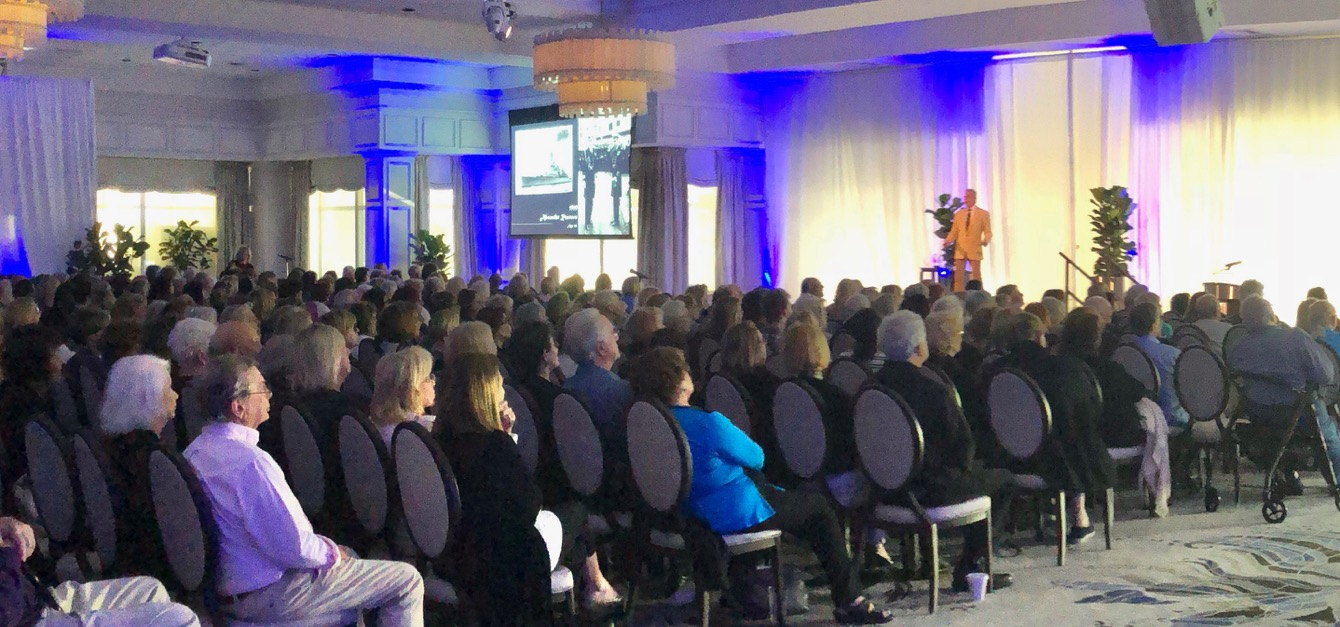
Richard Rene Silvin presenting at the Polo Club of Boca Raton, 2019

Silvin started lecturing about the Duchess of Windsor in 2010 after the release of his third book. He increased his lecture opportunities when he added Addison Mizner's life and work as a lecture topic in 2014. In 2016, with the publication of the Normandie book, he added this topic to his lecture series. Additionally, he expanded the Normandie presentation by lecturing about the history of transatlantic ocean liner travel in general. In 2017 Silvin premiered his presentation which chronicles the history of Mar-a-Lago, from Marjorie Merriweather Post to Donald Trump. He followed this up in 2019 with a presentation about the lives of several wealthy famous women whose money did not bring them happiness. This includes stories about his personal relationship with Ann Woodward. René and his brother grew up with Ann's two sons at Le Rosey. Ann killed her husband William Woodward Jr. Also included are Christina Onassis and Alexander Onassis who were childhood friends of René, and Barbara Hutton, Leona Helmsley and Sunny von Bülow. In 2020, during the COVID-19 pandemic lock down, he added another string of lecture topics, which he offered in Zoom format: Princess Margaret, Countess of Snowdon, whom he was friendly with in the 1980s, Princess Alice of Battenberg, Marilyn Monroe, Edith Piaf, Whitney Houston, Marlene Dietrich, whom he was also friendly with when he was a teenager, and the history of the Concorde. In 2021 he added the lives of Jacqueline Kennedy Onassis and Audrey Hepburn as lecture topics. In 2022 he premiered two new lecture topics: the life of architect Frank Lloyd Wright, and the movie career and life as a princess of Grace Kelly. In 2023 he premiered his new presentation about the life of Elizabeth Taylor, while in 2024 he added Katharine Hepburn to his repertoire. In 2025 he started presenting the life of Cary Grant.

He has lectured at several universities, as well as many venues in Key West, Palm Beach and West Palm Beach, Florida; Atlanta and Thomasville, Georgia; Newport, Rhode Island; North Carolina; Cape Cod, Nantucket, in the Berkshires, Massachusetts; and Harbor Springs, Michigan. Silvin is also a regular speaker at the well-known Kravis Center for the Performing Arts in West Palm Beach., the Society of the Four Arts in Palm Beach, Florida., as well as Glazer Hall at the Royal Poinciana Plaza in Palm Beach.

=== Other ===
In 2010 Silvin competed in the Gay Games in Cologne, Germany. He entered the body building competition in the over-60 class, and was awarded the gold medal. Because of this win, he published an article in the Queer Times, called "The Road To Cologne".

In 2014, Silvin was appointed to the Landmarks Preservation Commission in the town of Palm Beach, which is a voluntary position. Members are voted in by the Town Council. He served on this commission as the Senior Alternate from March 2014 until March 2016, when he was voted in as a full member. In December 2016 he became the Landmarks Commission's vice-chairman. In April 2020 Silvin was elected chairman of the Palm Beach Landmarks Preservation Commission. Because of term limits, Silvin ended his chairmanship in 2022. During his tenure on the Landmarks Preservation Commission Silvin was an outspoken supporter of the renovation of the Royal Poinciana Playhouse in Palm Beach, Florida.

== Bibliography ==
- I Survived Swiss Boarding Schools: An Arc To Triumph, 2006, ISBN 0-9764052-9-6.
- Walking the Rainbow: An Arc To Triumph, 2008, ISBN 978-0-87426-073-1
- Noblesse Oblige: The Duchess of Windsor As I Knew Her, 2010, ISBN 978-0-615-50578-7.
- Villa Mizner: The House That Changed Palm Beach, 2014, ISBN 978-1-884886-74-4.
- Normandie: The Tragic Story of The Most Majestic Ocean Liner, 2016, ISBN 978-0-692-54560-7.
- Noblesse Oblige: The Duchess of Windsor As I Knew Her - second edition, 2017, ISBN 978-1548619640.
- I Survived Swiss Boarding Schools, all that glitters is not gold - second edition, 2018 ISBN 978-1724780393.
- Walking the Rainbow, all that glitters is not gold - second edition, 2019 ISBN 978-1689181679.
- Survivor: A Story About Facing Adversity and Coming Out on Top, 2023 ISBN 979-8375499253.
