= Live at the Tractor Tavern =

Live album by Supersuckers
- Released: January 25, 2004
- Recorded: The Tractor Tavern in Seattle, Washington
- Genre: Country rock
- Length: 35:04
- Label: Mid-Fi Recordings
- Producer: Eddie Spaghetti; David Fisher

Supersuckers chronology
Live at the Magic Bag (2004)	Live at the Tractor Tavern (2004)	Devil's Food (2005)

Professional ratings
Review scores
Source	Rating
AllMusic	3/5 stars

Live at the Tractor Tavern is a live album by the American rock band Supersuckers. Released in 2004, it was recorded live at The Tractor Tavern, in Seattle, Washington.

== Critical reception ==
Ox-Fanzine wrote that "with 'Creepy eyes' and 'Doublewide' the men move in the meaningless no man's land between rock and country, little inspired, and both styles are just played down superficially." AllMusic wrote : "[Eddie] Spaghetti is your host for the evening, providing wry and rambling song intro commentaries, a get-to-know-the-band session, and a few memorable heckler retorts. The set might have been a bit longer, but other than that there really isn't anything here for Supersuckers devotees to complain about."

== Track listing ==
1. "Creepy Jackalope Eye" – 3:40
2. "Doublewide" – 2:40
3. "Sail On" – 4:12
4. "Pretty Fucked Up" – 4:17
5. "Killer Weed" – 7:45
6. "Born with a Tail" – 8:03
7. "Alabama, Louisiana or Maybe Tennessee" – 4:24

Harmonica on the album is played by Dave Lipkind from a Portland, Oregon, band called I Can Lick Any Sonofabitch in the House.
