= Play That Rock N' Roll =

Studio album by Supersuckers
- Released: February 7, 2020
- Studio: Pendernales Studio, Austin, Texas
- Genre: Rock and roll
- Label: Acetate Records
- Producer: Supersuckers

Supersuckers chronology
Suck It (2018)	Play That Rock N' Roll (2020)

Professional ratings
Review scores
Source	Rating
AllMusic	3.5/5 stars

Play That Rock N' Roll is a studio album by American rock band Supersuckers. It was released on February 7, 2020, by Acetate Records on CD and colored vinyl.

== Track listing ==
1. "Ain't Gonna Stop (Until I Stop It)"
2. "Getting Into Each Other's Pants"
3. "Deceptive Expectation"
4. "You Ain't the Boss of Me"
5. "Bringing It Back"
6. "Play That Rock-N-Roll"
7. "That's a Thing"
8. "Last Time Again"
9. "Die Alone"
10. "Dead, Jail or Rock-N-Roll"
11. "Untitled"
