= Must've Been Live =

Live album by Supersuckers
- Released: May 21, 2002
- Recorded: Dallas, Texas, Austin, Texas and San Diego, California
- Genre: Country
- Length: 66:16
- Label: Mid-Fi Recordings

Supersuckers chronology
Splitsville 1 (2002)	Must've Been Live (2002)	Fan Club CD Vol. 2 (2002)

Must've Been Live is a live album by the American rock band Supersuckers. It was released in November 2001 on Mid-Fi Recordings.

Professional ratings
Review scores
Source	Rating
AllMusic	2.5/5 stars
Robert Christgau	(3-star Honorable Mention)
No Depression	(unfavorable)

== Track listing ==
1. "Dead in the Water" – 2:23
2. "Good Livin'" – 2:12
3. "Roamin' Round" – 3:02
4. "Roadworn and Weary" – 4:07
5. "The Captain" – 4:22
6. "Hangin' Out With Me" – 2:20
7. "Barricade" – 3:28
8. "Drivin' Nails in My Coffin" – 3:04
9. "Cowpoke" – 2:34
10. "Don't Go Blue" – 5:16
11. "Must've Been High" – 4:25
12. "One Cigarette Away" – 2:59
13. "Alabama, Louisiana or Maybe Tennessee" – 4:36
14. "Hungover Together" – 5:02
15. "Non-Addictive Marijuana" – 4:55
16. "Ice Cold Beer Only" – 0:54
17. "The Image of Me" – 4:27
18. "Peace in the Valley" – 4:11
19. "Blow You Away" – 1:59

== Notes ==
- Tracks 1–13 recorded at Trees in Dallas, Texas
- Tracks 14–16 recorded at Casbah in San Diego, California
- Tracks 17–19 recorded at Antone's in Austin, Texas
