= Must've Been High =

Studio album by Supersuckers
- Released: March 25, 1997
- Recorded: Ironwood, Seattle, Washington
- Genre: Country, cowpunk
- Length: 40:01
- Label: Sub Pop
- Producer: Randall Jamail

Supersuckers chronology
The Sacrilicious Sounds of the Supersuckers (1995)	Must've Been High (1997)	How the Supersuckers Became the Greatest Rock and Roll Band in the World (1999)

Professional ratings
Review scores
Source	Rating
AllMusic	4/5 stars

Must've Been High is the fourth studio album by the American rock band Supersuckers. It was released on March 25, 1997, via Sub Pop.

== Track listing ==
1. "Must've Been High" – 3:28
2. "Dead in the Water" – 2:14
3. "Barricade" – 3:23
4. "Roamin' 'Round" – 3:05
5. "Hungover Together" – 4:06
6. "Non-Addictive Marijuana" – 2:47
7. "The Captain" – 3:06
8. "Blow You Away" – 1:54
9. "Roadworn and Weary" – 3:30
10. "Hangin' Out with Me" – 2:21
11. "Juicy Pureballs" – 1:52
12. "One Cigarette Away" – 2:50
13. "Hangliders" – 5:27

== Notes ==
- "Hungover Together" is a duet with Kelley Deal of the Breeders. The song was written by Gerald Collier of the Best Kissers in the World and performed as a duet with Carrie Akre, who was the lead singer of Hammerbox.
- "The Captain" documents Supersuckers' unsuccessful attempt to record with Captain Sensible of the Damned.
- The last track also includes the song "Supersucker Drive By Blues."
