= Holdin' the Bag =

Studio album by Supersuckers
- Released: October 16, 2015
- Recorded: Bismeaux Studios Austin, Texas
- Genre: Country
- Length: 36:32
- Label: Acetate Records
- Producer: Supersuckers

Supersuckers chronology
Get the Hell (2014)	Holdin' the Bag (2015)	Suck It (2018)

Professional ratings
Review scores
Source	Rating
AllMusic	3.5/5 stars

Holdin' the Bag is a country studio album by American rock band Supersuckers. It was released on October 16, 2015, by Acetate Records.

== Track listing ==
1. "Holdin' the Bag" – 4:00
2. "This Life (Would Be a Whole Lot Better If I Didn't Have to Share It) With You" – 3:11
3. "High & Outside" – 3:25
4. "Man on a Mission" – 3:06
5. "I Can't Cry" – 2:46
6. "Let's Bounce" – 2:41
7. "I Do What I Can (To Get By)" – 3:06
8. "Jibber Jabber" – 2:27
9. "That's How It Gets Done" – 3:13
10. "Shimmy & Shake" – 2:10
11. "All My Rowdy Friends (Have Settled Down)" – 4:04
12. "Georgia on a Fast Train" – 2:23
