= Suck It =

Studio album by Supersuckers
- Released: September 21, 2018
- Studio: Bismeaux Studio, Austin, Texas
- Genre: Rock
- Label: Acetate Records
- Producer: Supersuckers

Supersuckers chronology
| Holdin' the Bag (2015) | Suck It (2018) | Play That Rock N' Roll (2020) |

Professional ratings
Review scores
| Source | Rating |
|---|---|
| AllMusic | 3/5 stars |

Suck It is a studio album by American rock band Supersuckers. It was released on September 21, 2018, by Acetate Records.

== Track listing ==
1. "All of the Time"
2. "The History of Rock 'n' Roll"
3. "Dead Inside"
4. "Breaking My Balls"
5. "The Worst Thing Ever"
6. "What's Up (With This Motherfucking Thing?)"
7. "Cold Wet Wind"
8. "(I'm Gonna Choke Myself and Masturbate) 'Til I Die"
9. "Private Parking Lot"
10. "Beer Drinkers & Hell Raisers"
