= La Mano Cornuda =

Studio album by Supersuckers
- Released: March 1, 1994
- Recorded: November 1993
- Studio: Egg, Seattle, Washington
- Genre: Rock
- Label: Sub Pop
- Producer: Conrad Uno

Supersuckers chronology
The Smoke of Hell (1992)	La Mano Cornuda (1994)	The Sacrilicious Sounds of the Supersuckers (1995)

La Mano Cornuda is the second studio album by the American rock band Supersuckers. It was released on March 1, 1994, on Sub Pop. The title is Spanish for the horned hand, a reference to the hand sign often seen at rock and roll shows.

== Critical reception ==
Professional ratings
Review scores
Source	Rating
AllMusic	4.5/5 stars
The Encyclopedia of Popular Music	3/5 stars

The Encyclopedia of Popular Music deemed the album "hard rocking songs about hard drinking hard men." Trouser Press wrote that "Conrad Uno’s production doesn’t raise [Jack] Endino’s blinding gleam, but the effect is salutary, allowing the band to indulge its naturally wanton slop-rock instincts to great hairy effect." Eric Davidson, author of We Never Learn: The Gunk Punk Undergut, 1988-2001, considered it perhaps the band's "best all-around record."

== Track listing ==
1. "Creepy Jackalope Eye"
2. "Seventeen Poles"
3. "High Ya!"
4. "On the Couch"
5. "Clueless
6. "Sugie"
7. "Mudhead"
8. "Gold Top"
9. "How to Maximize Your Kill Count"
10. "I Was Born Without a Spine"
11. "Glad Damn Glad"
12. "She's My Bitch"
13. "The Schmooze"

== Notes ==
- The third track, "High Ya!", begins with an answering machine message from Matt Lukin of Mudhoney informing Eddie Spaghetti of his intended whereabouts the following night and intimating that he will be "holding".
- The final listed track, "The Schmooze", consists of an answering machine message from Sub Pop producer Jack Endino for Eddie Spaghetti in which the former tries to convince the latter to put him on the guest list for an upcoming show that Supersuckers are playing with Mudhoney.
- A final unlisted track contains the entire album, a second time.
