= Live at the Magic Bag =

Live album by Supersuckers
- Released: October 5, 2004
- Recorded: November 11, 2003, The Magic Bag, Ferndale, Michigan
- Genre: Rock
- Label: Mid-Fi Recordings
- Producer: Eddie Spaghetti; David Fisher

Supersuckers chronology
Motherfuckers Be Trippin' (2003)	Live at the Magic Bag (2004)	Live at the Tractor Tavern (2004)

Live at the Magic Bag is a live album by American rock band Supersuckers. Released in 2004, it was recorded live at The Magic Bag in Ferndale, Michigan.

== Track listing ==
1. "Rock 'n' Roll Records"
2. "Rock Your Ass"
3. "Bad, Bad, Bad"
4. "The Evil Powers of Rock 'n' Roll"
5. "Creepy Jackalope Eye"
6. "Bruises to Prove It"
7. "Supersucker Drive-By Blues"
8. "I Want the Drugs"
9. "Bubblegum & Beer"
10. "My Victim"
11. "Luck"
12. "Dirt Roads, Dead Ends and Dust"
13. "Fisticuffs"
14. "Gone Gamblin'"
15. "How to Maximize Your Kill Count"
16. "Goodbye"
17. "Pretty Fucked Up"
18. "That Is Rock 'n' Roll"
19. "Jailbreak"
20. "Born with a Tail"
