= Keller-Dorian cinematography =

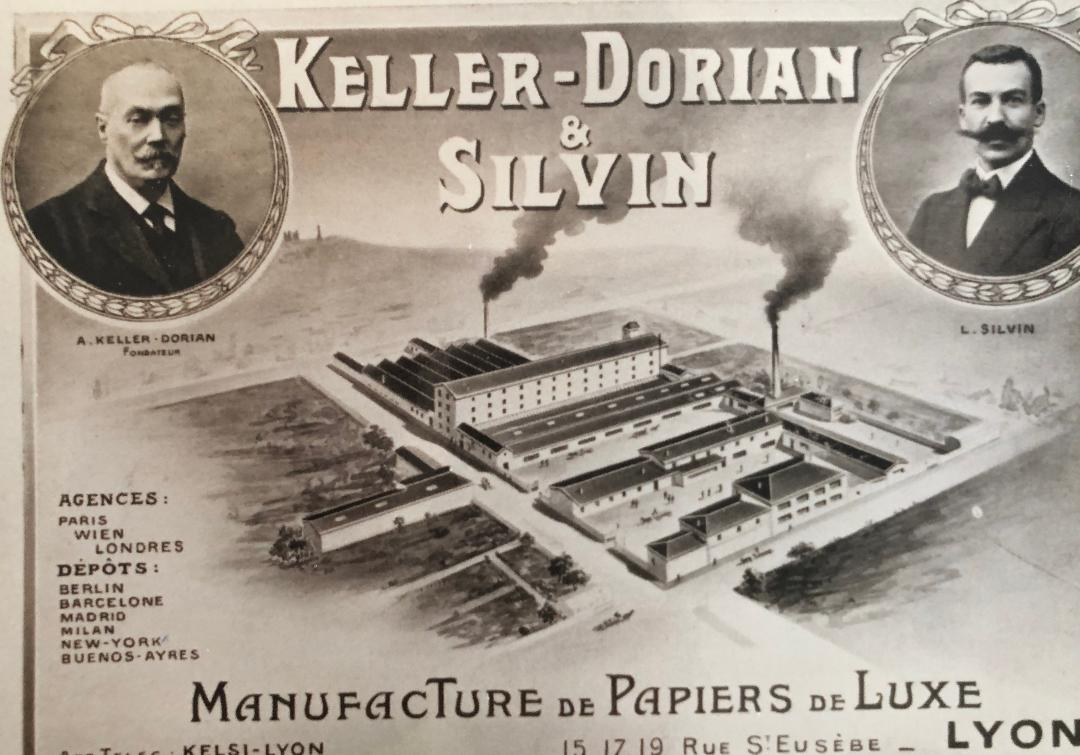
Advertisement for Keller-Dorian Silvin paper factory

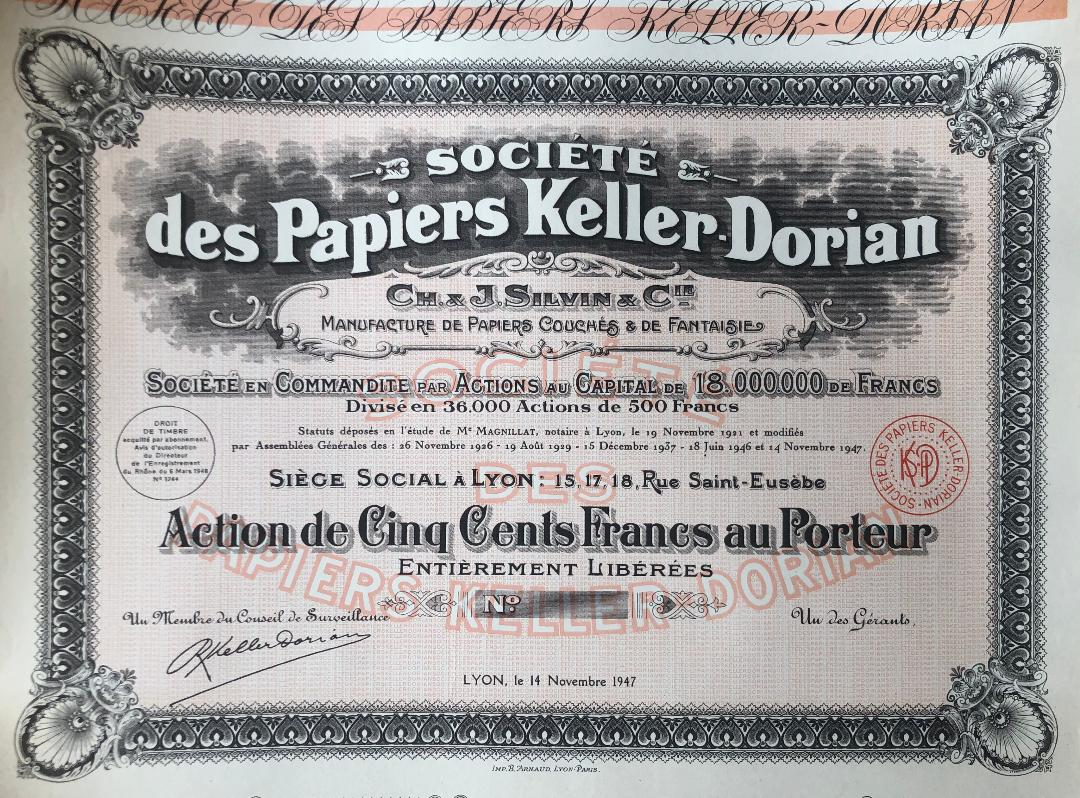
Stock certificate for Keller-Dorian Silvin paper company

Keller-Dorian cinematography was a French technique from the 1920s for filming movies in color, using a lenticular process to separate red, green and blue colors and record them on a single frame of black-and-white film. Keller-Dorian was primarily a manufacturer of paper and aluminum foil (tin foil). It was granted 38 patents. While researching how to create dyes to color aluminum foil, they accidentally stumbled onto this cinematography technique. This additive color system differs from other systems, for example, Technicolor, which divided the colors into more than one frame on one or more pieces of film.

The system was used to film several scenes of Abel Gance's Napoléon (1927) and La Femme et le Pantin by Jacques de Baroncelli (1928). However, the projection of this process in movie theaters seems to have been more difficult, so neither of these films was ever presented using this technique. Also, making prints was described by one source as "impossible."

This process was used by Eastman Kodak for the motion picture process Kodacolor, introduced in 1928 as the first amateur filmmaker's 16mm film color process available for the home movie market.

The company was founded by Albert Keller-Dorian and Léon Silvin, grandfather of Richard René Silvin. They were pioneers in employee benefits, and building housing compounds, which included low cost cafeterias adjacent to the factory in Lyon, France.

Upon the death of Léon Silvin in 1928, his sons, John Léon Silvin and Charles Silvin, inherited the patents. In about 1929 Ludwig Blattner bought the rights for the use outside the USA of the Keller-Dorian process, and this process was then known as the Blattner Keller-Dorian process, which lost out to rival colour systems.

== See also ==
- Color motion picture film
- List of film formats
- List of color film systems
