= The Supersuckers =

American rock band

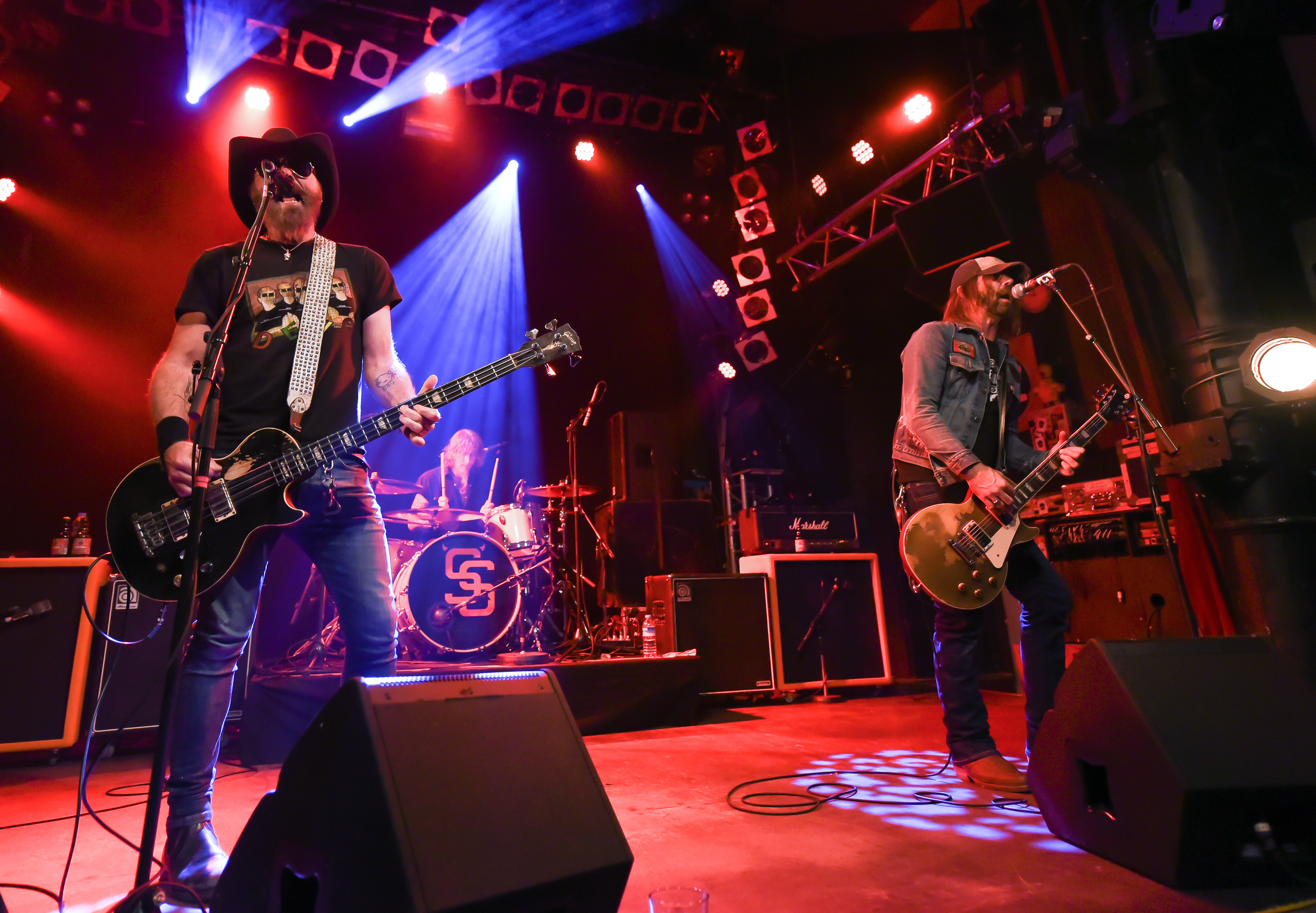
- The Supersuckers performing live at Metal Monday 2017

Background information
- Also known as: The Black Supersuckers
- Origin: Tucson, Arizona, U.S.
- Genres: Cowpunk; punk rock; alternative country
- Years active: 1988–present
- Labels: Sub Pop, Mid-Fi
- Members: Eddie Spaghetti; Marty Chandler; Christopher von Streicher
- Past members: Dancing Eagle; Ron Heathman; Rick Sims; Mike Musburger; Dusty Watson; Eric Martin; Scott Churilla; Dan "Thunder" Bolton
- Website: supersuckers.com

The Supersuckers (formerly known as The Black Supersuckers) are an American rock band, formed in 1988, whose music is influenced by both hard rock and country. AllMusic describes the band as "the bastard sons of Foghat, AC/DC, and ZZ Top after being weaned on punk rock, unafraid of massive guitar riffs, outsized personalities, or pledging allegiance to sex, weed, and Satan with a wink and a nudge."

Bassist/singer Eddie Spaghetti (real name Edward Daly) leads the band and is its only constant member. Their current lineup also includes guitarist Marty Chandler and drummer Christopher von Streicher. Their most recent album, Liquor, Women, Drugs & Killing, was released in October 2025.

== History ==
The Supersuckers formed in 1988 as The Black Supersuckers in Tucson, Arizona, first playing traditional punk rock. The original lineup was Edward "Eddie Spaghetti" Daly on bass, Dan "Thunder" Bolton and Ron "Rontrose" Heathman on guitars, Dan Siegel (who later used the stage name Dancing Eagle) on drums, and Eric Martin on vocals. All had been high school friends in Tucson. In 1989, they moved to Seattle, Washington, because a friend told them it had a ton of clubs to play and leather jackets could be worn in the summer. Martin left the band a year later and returned to Tucson, and Eddie Spaghetti took over on vocals. They recorded numerous singles and cover songs for various small labels before being signed to Sub Pop. Their early recordings are compiled on the 1992 release The Songs All Sound the Same. Their first album with Sub Pop, The Smoke of Hell, was released in 1992, featuring a cover by graphic artist Dan Clowes.

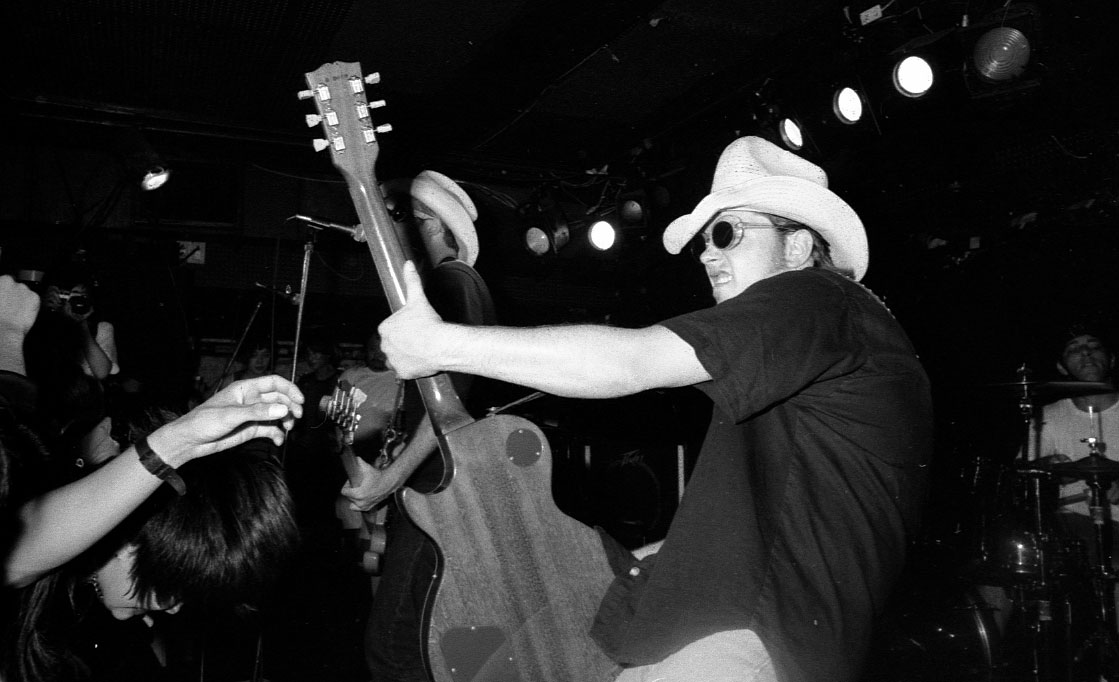
Supersuckers in Japan, 1994

In 1995, Heathman temporarily left the band and was replaced by Rick Sims, formerly of the Didjits (and later the Gaza Strippers), for the recording of their third album, The Sacrilicious Sounds of the Supersuckers, which was produced by Paul Leary. Also in 1995, the Supersuckers played at Farm Aid for the first time. In 1997, Heathman returned for the recording of their fourth album, Must've Been High, which signaled a move into alternative country after the previous two albums' hard rock. The album included a guest appearance by Willie Nelson, with whom the band had performed onstage at Farm Aid.

The band's final album with Sub-Pop was the compilation How the Supersuckers Became the Greatest Rock and Roll Band in the World in 1999. The band had left Sub Pop to sign a major-label deal with Interscope and announced a new traditional rock album, but they were dropped from the label during corporate restructuring and the planned album was never released. Some songs from the lost Interscope album appeared on the album The Evil Powers of Rock 'N' Roll in 1999, released on a small independent label. They contributed two songs, including one in collaboration with Eddie Vedder, to the charity album Free the West Memphis 3 in 2000. Disillusioned by the experience with Interscope, the band started their own label, Mid-Fi Recordings, in 2002.

Their first self-released album was Motherfuckers Be Trippin' in 2003. Drummer Dancing Eagle then left the band and was replaced by temporary drummers Mike "Murderburger" Musburger and Dusty Watson, followed by a six-year stint by Scott "Scottzilla" Churilla (who had previously played with Reverend Horton Heat). After several live albums and archival compilations released on their Mid-Fi label, and then finally another full-length album after many years, Get It Together, in 2008. The band then took an extended hiatus, during which Ron Heathman left the band for the second time and Eddie Spaghetti released two solo albums via Bloodshot Records. The band discontinued its Mid-Fi label and signed with Acetate Records, and Steamhammer Records in Europe, issuing the hard rock-oriented album Get the Hell in 2014. This album introduced new members "Metal" Marty Chandler on guitar and Christopher "Chango" von Streicher on drums.

In 2015, Eddie Spaghetti recovered from a cancer diagnosis, while the only other remaining original member of the band, Dan Bolton, departed and was not replaced. Now a trio with Spaghetti, Chandler, and von Streicher, the Supersuckers experimented with country music again in the 2015 album Holdin' the Bag. They returned to hard rock for the 2018 album Suck It. The album Play That Rock N' Roll, recorded at Willie Nelson's home studio in Austin, Texas, was released by Acetate / Steamhammer in February 2020. Founding guitarist Ron Heathman died in August 2020.

The band is scheduled to tour in the spring of 2026 with Scott H. Biram as support.

== Band members ==
=== Current ===
- Edward "Eddie Spaghetti" Daly – bass (1988–present), lead vocals (1989–present)
- "Metal" Marty Chandler – guitars, backing vocals (2009–present)
- Christopher "Chango" von Streicher – drums (2012–present)

=== Former ===
- Dancing Eagle/Dan Siegel – drums, backing vocals (1988–2003, 2008)
- Dan "Thunder" Bolton – guitars, backing vocals (1988–2003, 2005–2014)
- Ron "Rontrose" Heathman – guitars, backing vocals (1988–1995, 1996–2009, died 2020)
- Eric Martin – lead vocals (1988–1989, died early 1990s)
- Rick Sims – guitars, backing vocals (1995–1996)
- Dusty Watson – drums (2005–2006)
- Mike "Murderburger" Musburger – drums (2005–2006)
- Scott "Scottzilla" Churilla – drums (2006–2012)

== Discography ==
=== Studio albums ===
- The Smoke of Hell (1992)
- La Mano Cornuda (1994)
- The Sacrilicious Sounds of the Supersuckers (1995)
- Must've Been High (1997)
- The Evil Powers of Rock 'N' Roll (1999)
- Motherfuckers Be Trippin' (2003)
- Paid (EP) (2006)
- Get It Together (2008)
- Get the Hell (2014)
- Holdin' the Bag (2015)
- Suck It (2018)
- Play That Rock N' Roll (2020)
- Liquor, Women, Drugs & Killing (2025)

=== Split releases ===
- "Reverend Horton Heat"/"Supersuckers" (1994 split ep 400 Bucks/ Caliente Sub Pop.)
- "Supersuckers" / "Steve Earle" (1997; split single with Steve Earle)
- Splitsville 1 (2002; split album with Electric Frankenstein)

=== Live albums ===
- At Budokan (1994)
- Must've Been Live (2002)
- Live at the Magic Bag (2004)
- Live at the Tractor Tavern (2004)
- Live at Bart's CD Cellar & Record Shop (Live At Bart's CD Cellar & Record Shop, Boulder, Colorado, October2nd, 2004 ) (2006)
- Live at the Whole Foods Market Digital Download (Live At 96 WAVE - Charleston's Rock Radio Station 9/06) (2007)
- Supersuckers XX 20th Anniversary Show 1988-2008 (2009)
- Live at Hammersmith Apollo & Indig02 (2011)

=== Compilation albums ===
- The Songs All Sound the Same (1992)
- How the Supersuckers Became the Greatest Rock and Roll Band in the World (1999)
- Devil's Food (2005)
- Black Supersuckers – Sub Pop Demos (2009)
- 50,000 Middle Fingers Can't Be Wrong ...Selections from the Mid-fi Catalog Digital Download Album (2013)

== As Eddie Spaghetti ==
- The Sauce (2003)
- Sundowner (2011)
