= The Sacrilicious Sounds of the Supersuckers =

Studio album by the Supersuckers
- Released: August 1995
- Recorded: Arlyn, Austin, Texas
- Genre: Rock
- Length: 40:22
- Label: Sub Pop
- Producer: Paul Leary

The Supersuckers chronology
La Mano Cornuda (1994)	The Sacrilicious Sounds of the Supersuckers (1995)	Must've Been High (1997)

Professional ratings
Review scores
Source	Rating
AllMusic	2.5/5 stars

The Sacrilicious Sounds of the Supersuckers is the third studio album by the American rock band the Supersuckers, released in 1995 on Sub Pop.

The word sacrilicious is a portmanteau of sacrilegious and delicious. It was popularized in "Homer Loves Flanders", a 1994 episode of the television series The Simpsons.

== Track listing ==
1. "Bad, Bad, Bad" – 2:20
2. "Born with a Tail" – 3:15
3. "The 19th Most Powerful Woman in Rock" – 2:53
4. "Doublewide" – 2:17
5. "Bad Dog" – 3:50
6. "Money into Sin" – 2:15
7. "Marie" – 3:26
8. "The Thing About That" – 2:19
9. "Ozzy" – 2:34
10. "Run Like a Motherfucker" (Rick Sims Vox) – 2:23
11. "Hittin' the Gravel" – 2:23
12. "Stoned If You Want It" – 2:11
13. "My Victim" – 3:55
14. "Don't Go Blue" – 4:20

== Personnel ==
Supersuckers

- Eddie Spaghetti – vocals, bass
- Rick Sims – guitar, backing vocals
- Dancing Eagle – drums
- Dan Bolton – guitar

Production and additional personnel

Paul Leary – production

== Notes ==
- "Marie" documents the death of original lead singer Eric Martin of a drug overdose.
- "Don't Go Blue" has Bobbie Nelson, sister of the country musician Willie Nelson, on piano.
- The original print run of the CD had a lenticular cover. This gave it a 3D effect and allowed the album title to appear and disappear.
- "Born with a Tail" was released as single and made into a music video.
