= Kodacolor (filmmaking) =

In motion pictures, Kodak's Kodacolor brand was originally associated with an early lenticular (additive color) color motion picture process, first introduced in 1928 for 16mm film. The process was based on the Keller-Dorian system of color photography.

== Technical process ==
The process used a special panchromatic black-and-white film stock, oriented with the emulsion away from the lens. The film base was embossed along the length of the film with microscopic lenticular bands. These lenticles were precisely shaped to focus light directly onto the emulsion in parallel strips along the length of the film from three color strips in a filter placed over the lens. A record of the color content in black and white was thereby created and could be reconstituted by projecting the film through an identical filter. The three colored stripes (red, green and blue-violet) of the filter had to be precisely oriented parallel to the film length. When an exposure was made, the varying proportion of each color reflected from the subject passed through the filter and was recorded on the film beneath each of the embossed lenticular bands as areas of strips in groups of three, each strip varying in density according to the received color value. (Dufaycolor used similar principles, but had the filter as part of the film itself).

Filming required the camera to be used at f/1.9 only, so that the striped filter worked correctly. The original Kodacolor film required an exposure of about a 1/30 second at f/1.9 in bright sunlight representing a film 'speed' (sensitivity) in modern terms of about 0.5 ISO. The physical movement of the film through the gate (frame-advance) requires additional time. The later Super Sensitive Kodacolor could be used "outdoors in any good photographic light, and even indoors under favourable conditions." Because an iris diaphragm might interfere with the projected area of the filter bands, when exposure control was required in very bright light, it had to be accomplished with neutral density filters, which were provided as part of the filter set.

To project the film a projector was required fitted with the Kodacolor Projection Filter, which is identical in effect to the filter fitted to the camera. The black and white lenticular image on the film is reconstituted into a natural color picture on the screen. As with most color processes involving a lenticular image, the pattern intrudes as visible lines on the projected image. Due to the fact that each color band in the filter is sharp-cutting, two-thirds of the light from the projection source is absorbed, so there is noticeable light loss.

While Kodacolor was a popular color home movie format, it had several drawbacks. It was not possible to make duplicates, special film was necessary to shoot with, and while the additive image was colorful and clear, the greater light absorption from the use of additive filters required brighter light sources to project, and was not practical to project over very long distances.

Lenticular Kodacolor was phased out after the introduction of 16 mm Kodachrome film in 1935.

== See also ==
- List of color film systems
- Color motion picture film
- Dufaycolor
