= Splitsville 1 =

Studio album by Supersuckers/Electric Frankenstein
- Released: April 16, 2002
- Genre: Rock
- Label: The Music Cartel

Supersuckers/Electric Frankenstein chronology
| The Evil Powers of Rock 'N' Roll (2002) | Splitsville 1 (2002) | Must've Been Live (2002) |

Professional ratings
Review scores
| Source | Rating |
|---|---|
| AllMusic | 3/5 stars |

Splitsville 1 is a split album by the American rock bands Supersuckers and Electric Frankenstein. It was released in 2002 via The Music Cartel. Each band covers a song by the other.

== Track listing ==
Supersuckers:

1. "Then I'm Gone"
2. "Shit Fire"
3. "Devil's Food"
4. "Kid's got it Comin'"
5. "Teenage Shutdown" (Electric Frankenstein cover)

Electric Frankenstein:

1. "Sweet Baby Arrogance"
2. "Rip it Apart"
3. "Good for Nothing"
4. "Not this Time"
5. "She's My Bitch" (Supersuckers cover)
