= The Black Pirate =

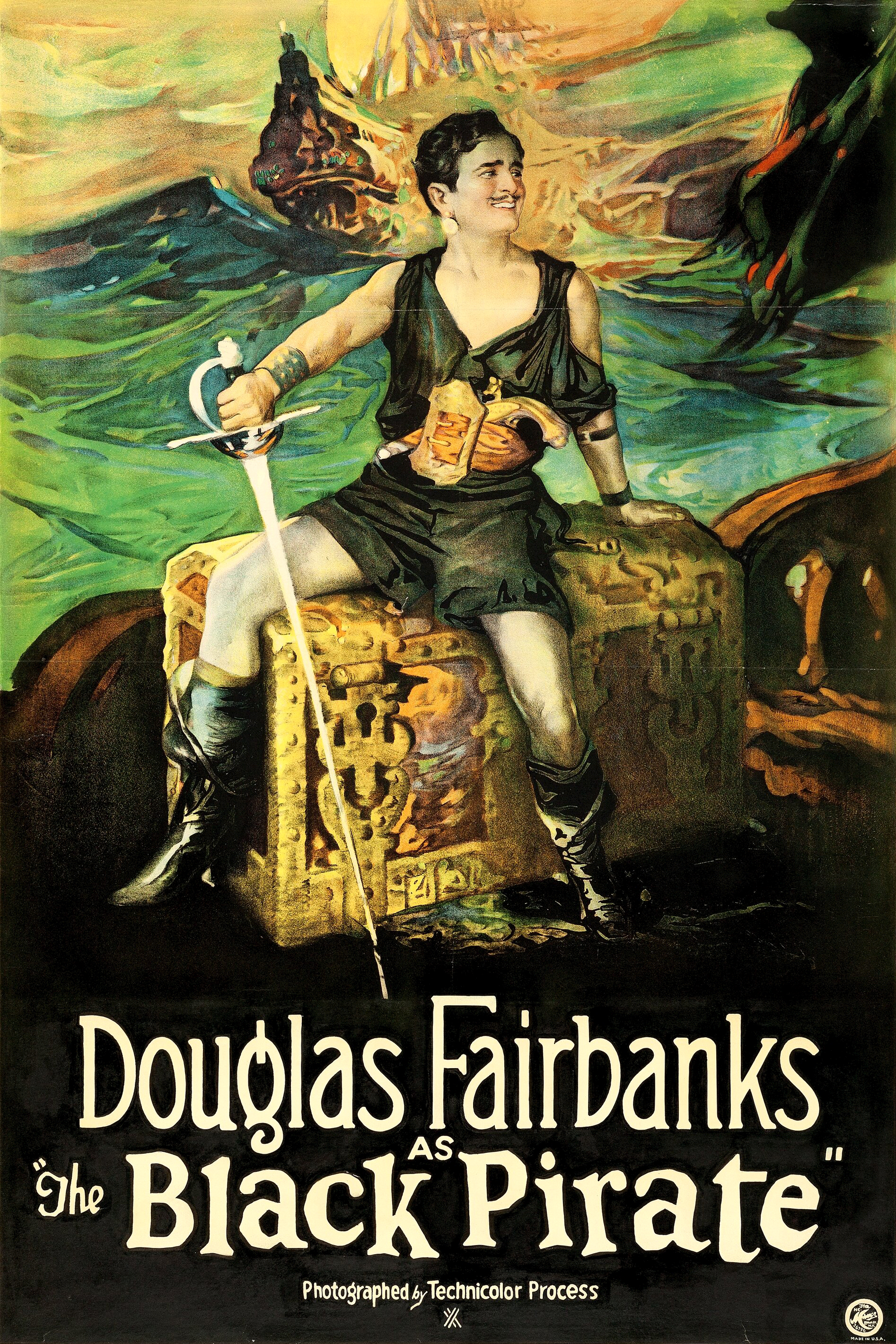
- Directed by: Albert Parker
- Written by: Jack Cunningham
- Produced by: Douglas Fairbanks
- Starring: Douglas Fairbanks; Billie Dove; Tempe Pigott; Donald Crisp
- Cinematography: Henry Sharp (overall cinematography; b&w camera); Arthur Ball (Technicolor camera); George Cave (Technicolor camera)
- Music by: Mortimer Wilson
- Production companies: The Elton Corporation; Technicolor Motion Picture Corporation
- Distributed by: United Artists
- Release date: March 8, 1926
- Running time: 94 minutes (Note: Based on 2,588 m (8,491 ft) and projection at the recommended speed of 266 m (873 ft) per minute.)
- Country: United States
- Language: Silent (English intertitles)
- Budget: $1,300,000
- Box office: $1.7 million (U.S. and Canada rentals)

The Black Pirate is a 1926 American silent color adventure film directed by Albert Parker, starring Douglas Fairbanks, Billie Dove, Donald Crisp, Sam De Grasse, and Anders Randolf.

After the first natural color films appeared in 1922, Douglas Fairbanks envisioned a color pirate film. However, he waited to start production until 1925. Once Technicolor had improved its filming and printing capacity, Fairbanks took financial risks due to the added costs and fragility of the film process. He also hesitated because color was rumored to distract from the narrative and strain viewers' eyes.

To address these concerns, Fairbanks avoided Technicolor's saturated tones and instead chose a restricted palette, inspired by Flemish painters and American illustrators who had popularized pirate themes in the early twentieth century. His team spent months testing and refining color control for all on-screen elements, including the studio-created ocean. This focus on visual consistency also led to the simplification of the story, contributing to the film's success. Fairbanks continued to deliver his signature acrobatic stunts.

The film achieved international success, notably for its colors, but suffered from the fragility of its two-strip laminated film. This issue prompted Technicolor to abandon the process and develop a more durable single-strip film, which was later used for some prints. The Black Pirate became both a commercial and technical milestone, showcasing Fairbanks's influence, while also exposing the process's limitations.

In his subsequent films, Fairbanks considered using Technicolor again but gave up on it for various reasons. In 1928, when Technicolor felt that it had overcome the difficulties encountered with The Black Pirate, it produced The Viking (1928) as a demonstration, for which Fairbanks' film would serve as a hidden model. Other successful films, including The Black Swan (1942) with Tyrone Power, and The Crimson Pirate (1952) with Burt Lancaster would further exploit the link he had imagined between pirates and Technicolor.

In 1993, The Black Pirate was selected for preservation in the United States National Film Registry by the Library of Congress as being "culturally, historically, or aesthetically significant."

== Plot ==
The Black Pirate

Pirates capture, badly maul, and loot a ship. After relieving the ship and crew of valuables, the pirates fire the ship, blowing up the gunpowder on board, sinking her. While the pirates celebrate, two survivors wash up on an island: an old man and his son. Before dying, the older man gives his signet ring to his son. His son buries him, vowing vengeance.

The Pirate Captain and Lieutenant bring some crew to the other side of the same island to bury some of their plunder. They then plan to murder the other pirates: "Dead men tell no tales." But first, the son appears as the "Black Pirate", who offers to join their company and fight their best man to prove his worth. After much fighting, the Black Pirate kills the Pirate Captain. The Pirate Lieutenant sneers and says there is more to being a pirate than sword tricks. To further prove his worth, the Black Pirate says he will capture the next ship of prey single-handed, which he does. He then uses his wits to prevent the pirates from blowing up the ship along with the crew and passengers, suggesting that they hold the ship for ransom.

When a beautiful woman is discovered on board, the Pirate Lieutenant claims her. Being in love at first sight for her, the Black Pirate finds a way to temporarily save her from this fate by presenting her as a "princess" and urging the crew to use her as a hostage to ensure their ransom will be paid, as long as she remains "spotless and unharmed".

The pirates cheer the Black Pirate and want to name him captain. The Pirate Lieutenant jeers but consents to wait to see if the ransom is paid by noon the next day. However, he secretly has a confederate destroy the ransom ship later that night to ensure it will not return. Then, when the Black Pirate is caught trying to release the woman, the Pirate Lieutenant exposes him as a traitor, and the pirates force him to walk the plank.

At noon the next day, with the ransom ship having failed to show, the Pirate Lieutenant goes to the "princess" to claim his prize. But just then, the Black Pirate, who with the help of the sympathetic one-armed pirate MacTavish had survived being sent overboard, returns, leading troops to stop the pirates. After a long fight, the pirates are routed. In the end, the Black Pirate is revealed to be a Duke, and the "princess" he loves is a real Princess. Even MacTavish is moved to tears of joy by the happy ending.

== Cast ==
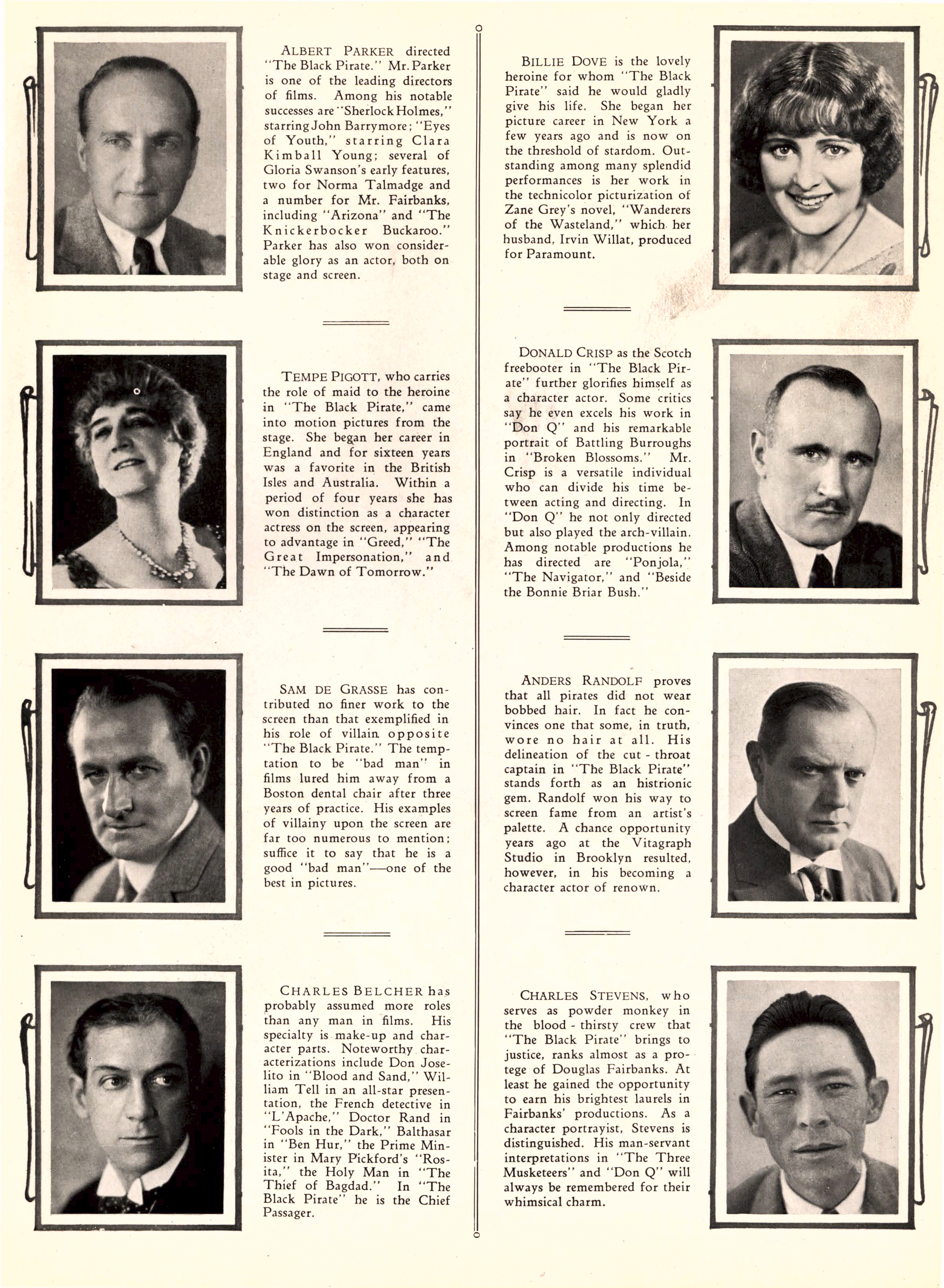
Page from the souvenir book.

- Douglas Fairbanks as the Duke of Arnoldo / "The Black Pirate"
- Billie Dove as Princess Isobel
- Anders Randolf as Pirate Captain
- Donald Crisp as MacTavish
- Tempe Pigott as Duenna
- Sam De Grasse as Pirate Lieutenant
- Charles Stevens as powder man
- Charles Belcher as chief passenger (nobleman)
- E. J. Ratcliffe as the Governor
- John Wallace as peg-leg pirate
- Fred Becker as pirate
- Nino Cochise as pirate (uncredited)
- Jimmy Dime as pirate (uncredited)
- George Holt as pirate (uncredited)
- Harold Kruger as pirate (uncredited)
- Charles Lewis as pirate (uncredited)
- Barry Norton as youth (uncredited)
- Mary Pickford as Princess Isobel in final embrace (uncredited cameo)
- Bob Roper as pirate (uncredited)

== Production ==
=== Precedents ===
The Black Pirate is considered "one of the silent films that is best remembered" Part of that reputation is based on the plot, but above all on the fact that it was one of the first films shot with the Technicolor two-tone process, which was rare and very expensive at the time. The Black Pirate is often referred to as the first "good" color film, with a "level of quality [of colour] never before seen in a feature film." Given the limitations of the process used, it is also a "flawed but strangely beautiful artifact". According to his son, Fairbanks was "the first to make a feature film in color", despite the prohibitive cost and technical problems, spending "a whole year with laboratory experiments to find the combination that would be the most restful for the eye" and choosing a chromatic choice that "no one had ever thought of".

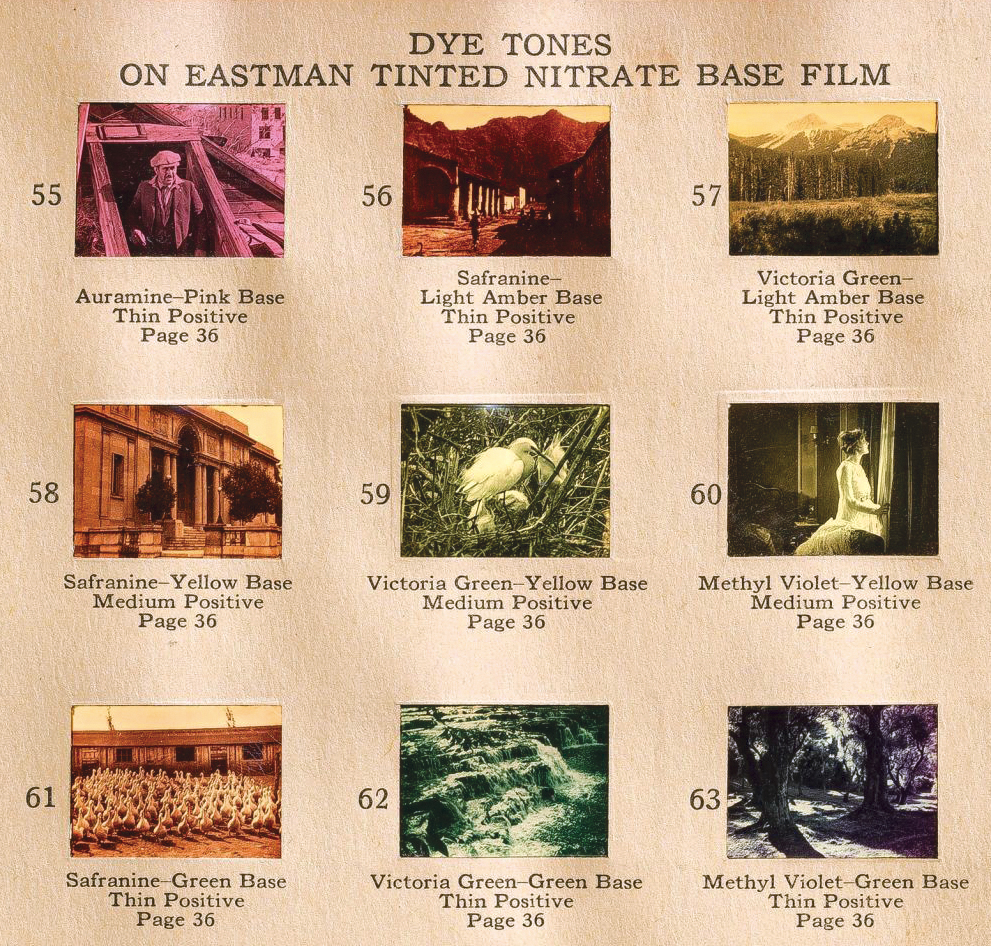
Kodak color chart for tinting and turning of films (1927).

However, the film is far from being the first to use colors. These have been present since the earliest days of cinema, not to perfect an illusion of realism, but as an ornamental and spectacular attraction. In 1926, when Fairbanks' film was released, 80 to 85% of film productions featured color effects, mainly by tinting or toning. These are arbitrary colors, added with dyes, and are supposed to connote the psychological atmosphere of the scene. On the other hand, the colors of The Black Pirate are supposed to be natural, i.e., produced by the subject's light imprint alone "in such a way that the colors are exclusively chosen and reproduced by optical and mechanical means". The opposition between natural and artificial colors dates back to the introduction in the 1910s of the first natural color process, Kinemacolor, the predecessor of Technicolor and a competitor of the Pathécolor process, which used stencil coloring. However, for technical reasons, the supposedly "natural" processes of Kinemacolor and then Technicolor are based on compression, simplifying the removal of blue, one of the three primary components of color, to retain only a "duotone" of red and green. The lack of fidelity in certain parts of the spectrum, combined with other technical problems, leads to a paradoxical situation where processes that are supposed to give colors greater veracity, or even a "sterecopic" quality, present worse results in some respects than those deemed artificial and subjective. Like its predecessor, Technicolor has a complex relationship with competing processes, sometimes opposing them in the name of the distinction between the natural and the artificial and sometimes in the name of the aesthetic quality of the result, the cinematographic color being compared to that of the painting of the "old masters".

Technicolor process No. 2 used in the film Stage Struck (1925), produced by superimposing and pasting a green recording, dyed red, and a red recording, dyed green. The actress pictured here is Gloria Swanson.

Technicolor Process No. 2 used for Fairbanks' film is a process for rendering natural colors by duotone developed in 1921 and which represented a significant improvement over Technicolor No. 1, for which the Technicolor company had been established in 1915. Process No. 1, two-tone like its successor, had the disadvantage of requiring the separate projection of the green and red recordings, the two images being superimposed on the screen, by additive synthesis, with the inevitable colored fringes as soon as the subject was in motion. (Note: A critic of the time considered that the process did not render either the interiors or the faces well, giving the latter a chromo-like appearance. He doubts that this innovation will ever supplant black and white, whose photographic verisimilitude is immediately understood by the viewer.) On the contrary, in process number 2, called subtractive synthesis, the red and green recordings are glued back-to-back to form just one single reel, usable with the projector model available in all theaters.

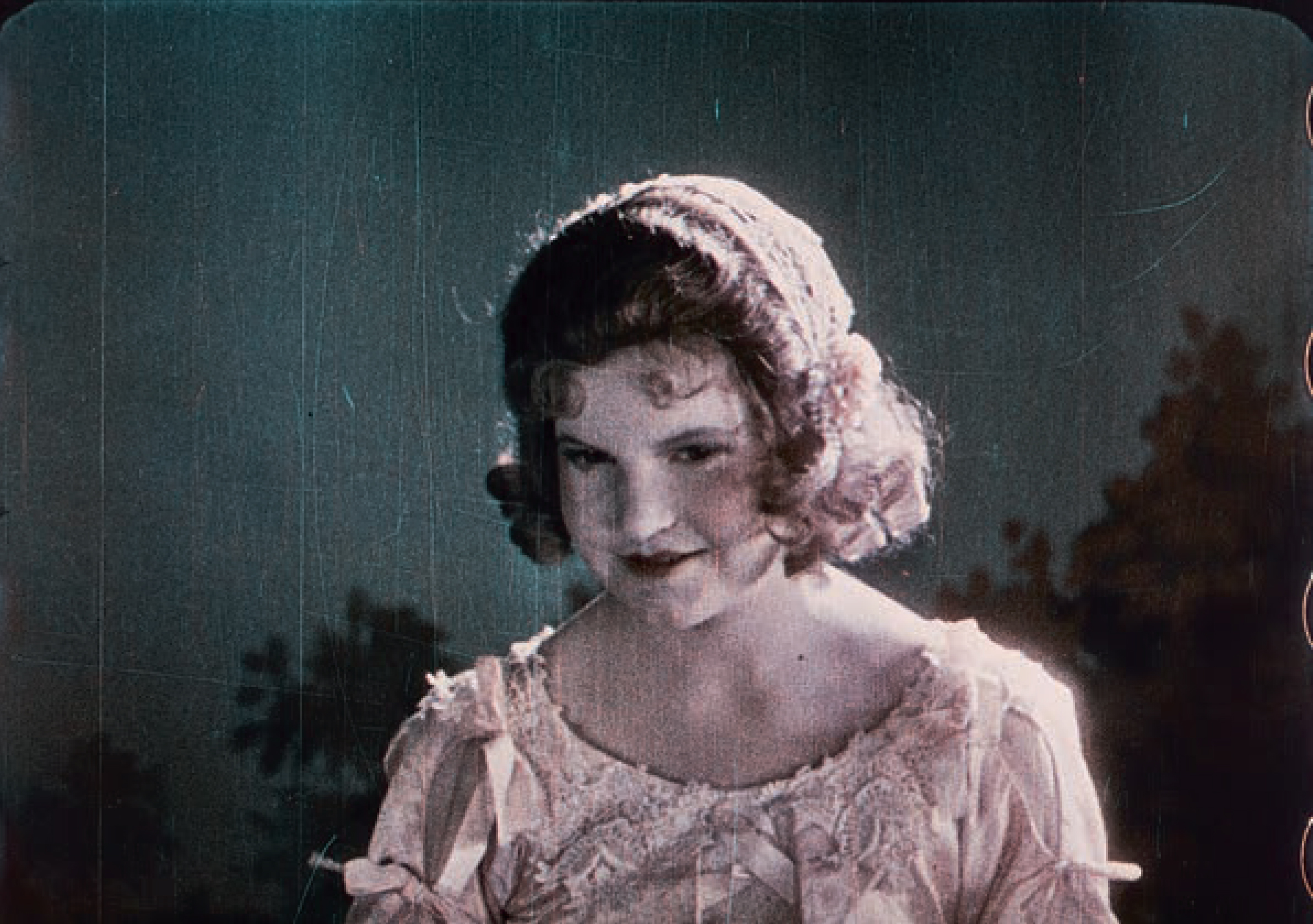
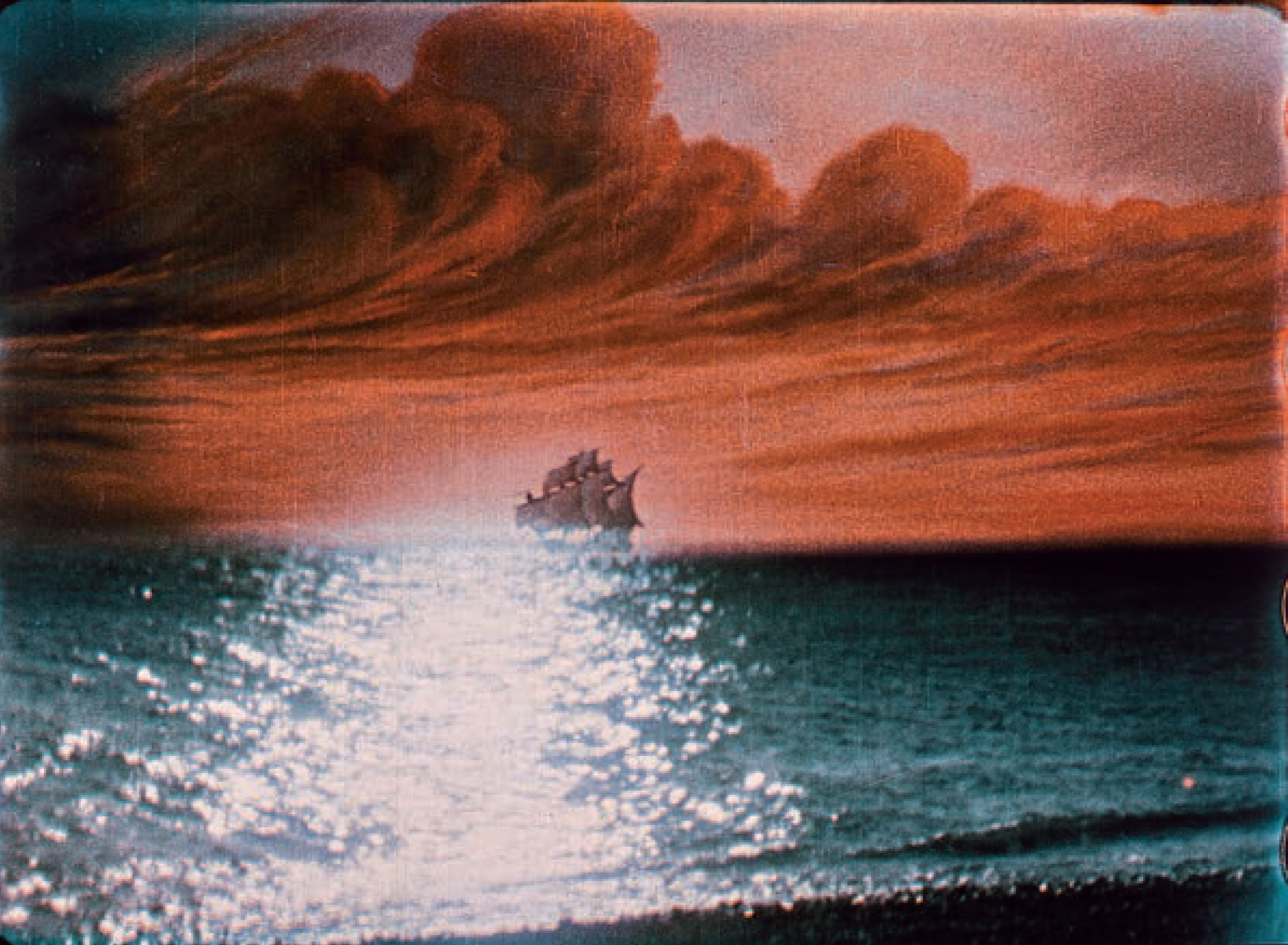
Stills from The Glorious Adventure (1922), filmed in Prizma Color.

The Black Pirate is not the first subtractive duotone fiction film; however, this primacy belongs to The Glorious Adventure, directed by James Stuart Blackton in Prizma Color and released in 1922. It was also not the first film made entirely in Technicolor No. 2, since it was preceded by Chester M. Franklin's The Toll of the Sea, a medium-length film also released in 1922 and produced by the Technicolor company to promote its process. The Glorious Aventure demonstrates the ability of the Prizma Color process to delicately reproduce skin tones, while exposing himself to reproach for "stained glass effects" that seem to be directly derived from magic lantern views and for poorly proportioned costume colors and backgrounds, Bernard Eisenschitz even believes that "all the critics" condemn the colors.

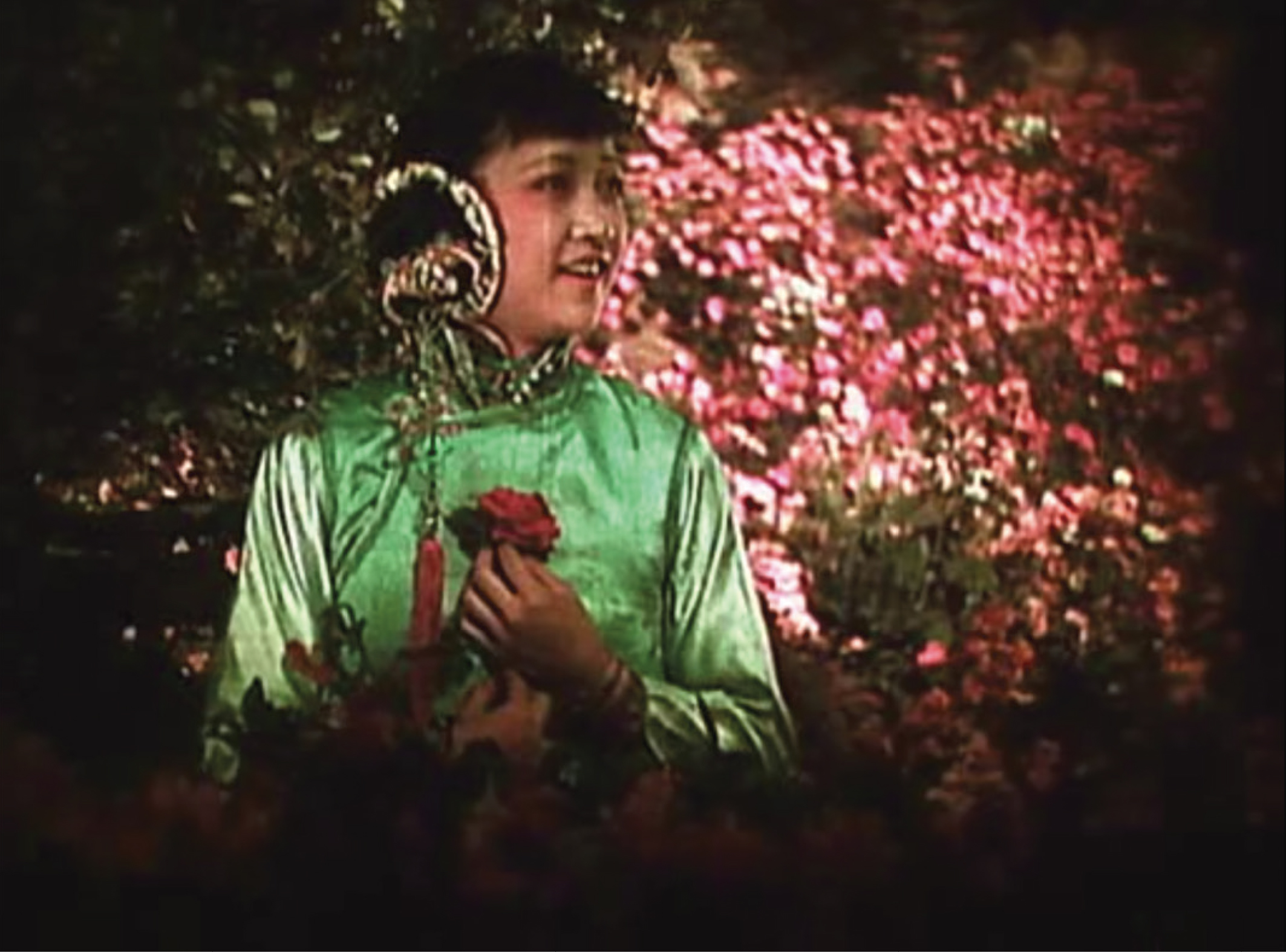
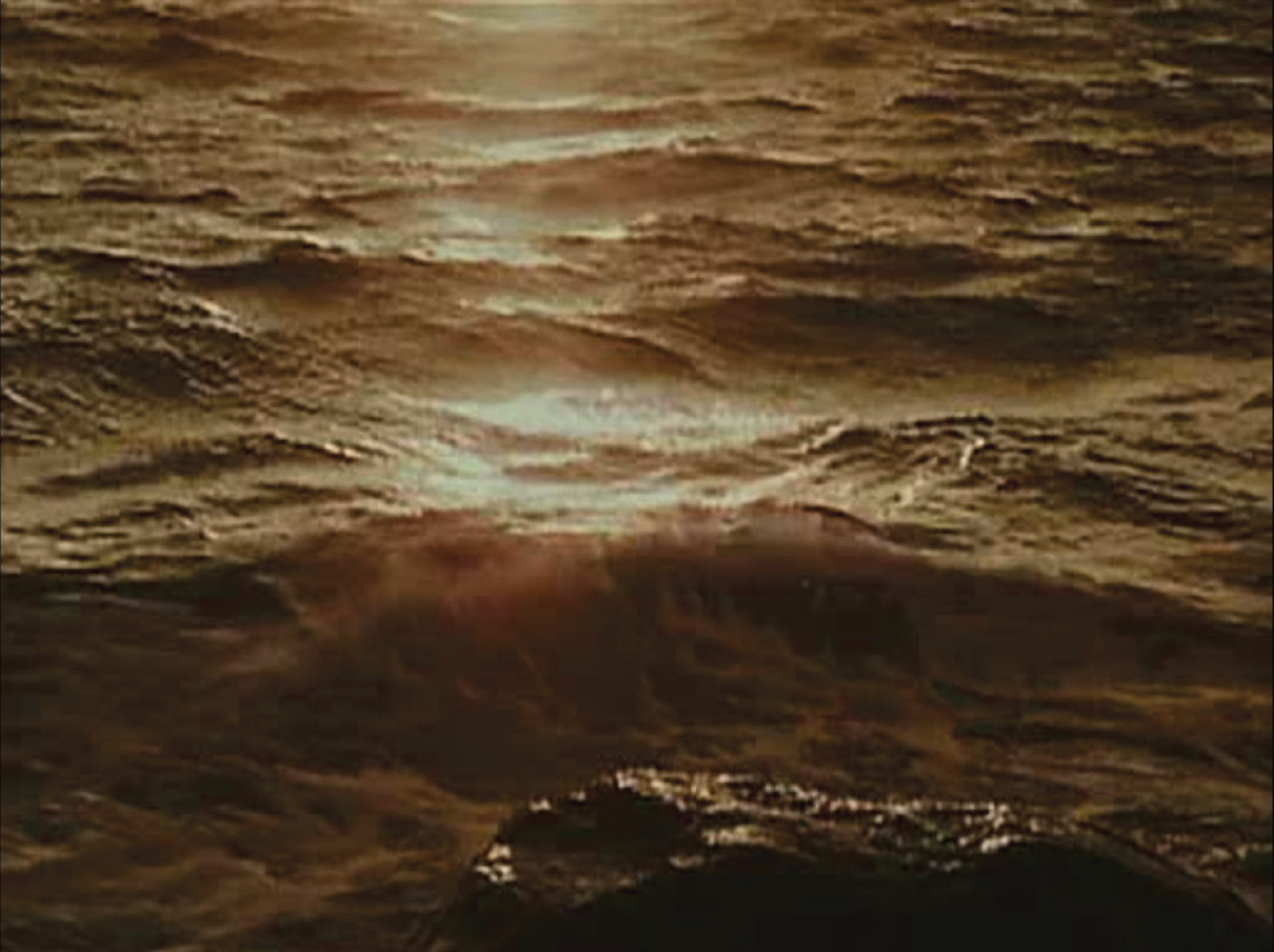
Stills from The Toll of the Sea (1922) featuring Anna May Wong. The process is optimized for rendering skin tones and foliage, but struggles to reproduce the blues of the sky and water accurately.

The Toll of the Sea, on the other hand, has a well-defined and stable image, with bright orange and red tones, but a tendency towards brown and impasto in the rendering of vegetal exteriors and distances. Repeating the choices of the inventors of Kinemacolor, Technicolor's engineers prioritize skin tones and sacrifice the blue of the sea and sky, which leads to a "paradoxical coexistence of the natural and the ornamental". (Note: The theme of the film, loosely derived from Madame Butterfly (Note: The theme of the film, loosely derived from Madame Butterfly, is in itself significant of the role assigned to the "natural" color in the cinema of the time, which was to symbolically highlight the effects of narration or meaning, with the use of colors in the film oscillating "constantly between the pictorial vision of a postcard Orient and the decidedly documentary tone of scenes filmed outdoors.") is in itself significant of the role assigned to the "natural" color in the cinema of the time, which was to symbolically highlight the effects of narration or meaning, with the use of colors in the film oscillating "constantly between the pictorial vision of a postcard Orient and the decidedly documentary tone of scenes filmed outdoors.") Professionals enthusiastically receive both films and help to create a demand for natural colors, due to the disappearance of the effects of colored fringes of previous processes and the beauty of subtractive duotone, perceived as providing "everything that can be desired", particularly the rendering of flesh tones which acquire the quality of "exquisite" paintings "endowed with life" However, it would take four years for a second film, made entirely in Technicolor, to be released, which would be Fairbanks'.

Technicolor scene from The Ten Commandments (1923).

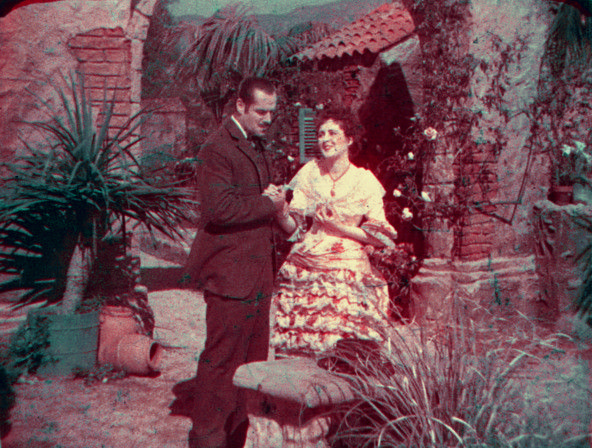
Frame from Wanderer of the Wasteland (1924) with Jack Holt and Billie Dove.

The difficulties of printing these films betray the still experimental nature of the processes. It was not until four months after the premiere of The Toll of the Sea that the film went into general release, due to Technicolor's lengthy process of developing prints. These logistical problems led Technicolor to increase the development capacity of its Boston plant, open a small laboratory in Hollywood, and then solicit producers to obtain the work needed to supply this increased production capacity. Herbert Kalmus, the president of Technicolor, proposed to Cecil B. DeMille to shoot color sequences for the film The Ten Commandments in 1923 at his own expense. Their success with the public convinced Jesse Lasky, the head of Paramount, to take the risk of signing a contract with Technicolor in November 1923 for a western with several scenes in Technicolor, Wanderer of the Wasteland, which was released in 1924 and whose "pictorial beauty" was praised by the press. (Note: This film, of which no copies have survived, was advertised as being presented entirely in full natural color, although many of its scenes were in tinted black and white.) The New York Herald Tribune reviewer, however, noted that it was impossible to concentrate on the story when "images far more beautiful than the works of the great masters" were parading by. Its director, Irvin Willat, pays particular attention to the film's chromatic balance, seeking to avoid overly bright red and green tones and not separating himself during the shooting of reference watercolor charts. It leverages the consistency between Technicolor's palette and the orange and green tones characteristic of the Southwestern United States. However, several factors mitigated the film's success: Technicolor took more than a year to deliver the 280 prints ordered by Paramount, the cost of color printing was high, and the process of gluing two films back to back made the prints fragile.

Despite the interest it aroused, the Technicolor process remained little used by the film industry prior to The Black Pirate, (Note: About thirty Hollywood films released between 1923 and 1926 feature a Technicolor scene) which continued to prefer tinting and toning, and even coloring for certain special effects, and to reserve its use for particular sequences. For example, in Ben-Hur, the biblical scenes were constructed like paintings. The studios' reluctance was due to the cost and production limitations of the Technicolor print, as well as concerns about the potentially deleterious effect of natural colors, which were said to tire the viewer and distract them from the narrative.

=== Beginnings ===
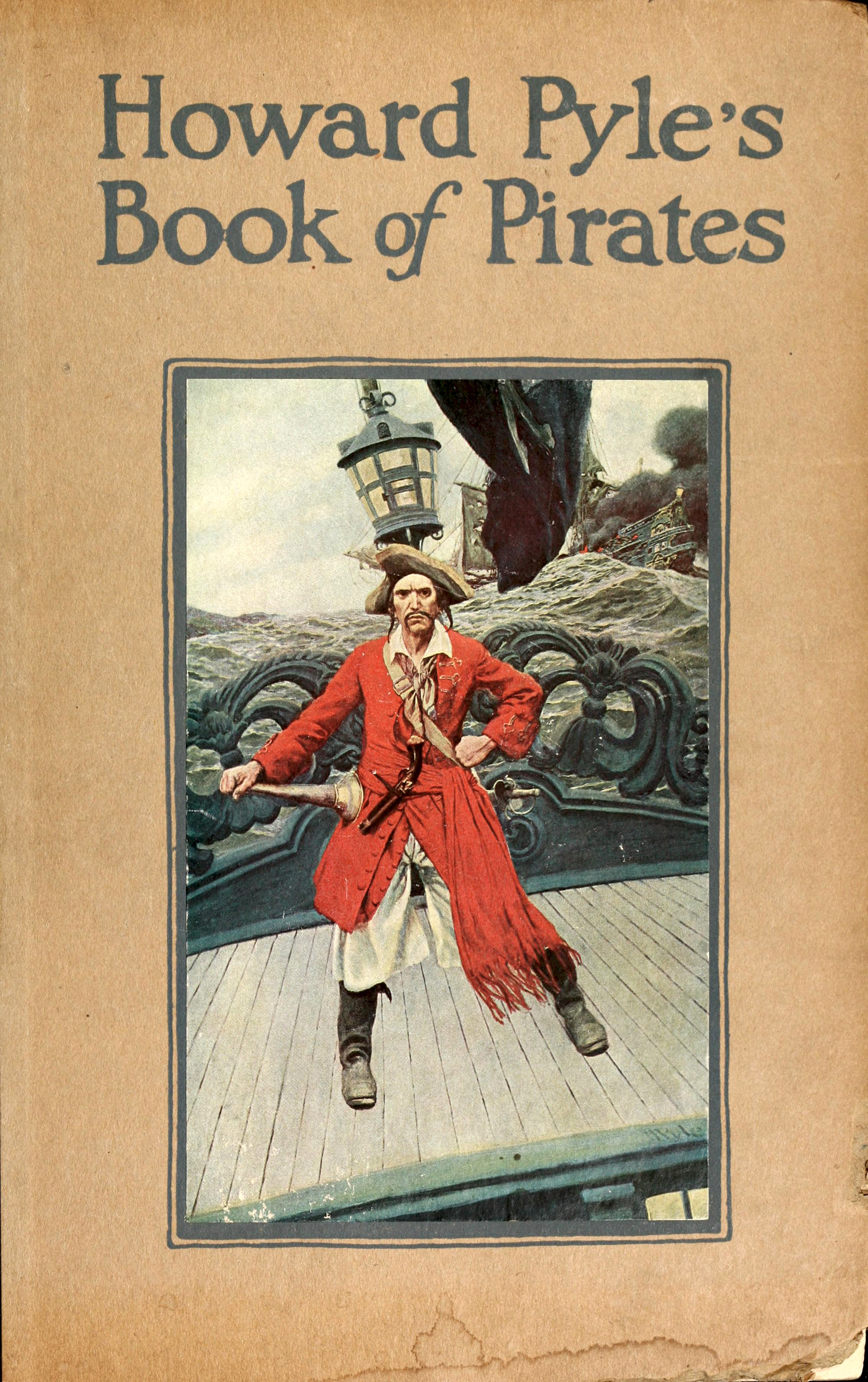
Cover by Howard Pyle (1921).

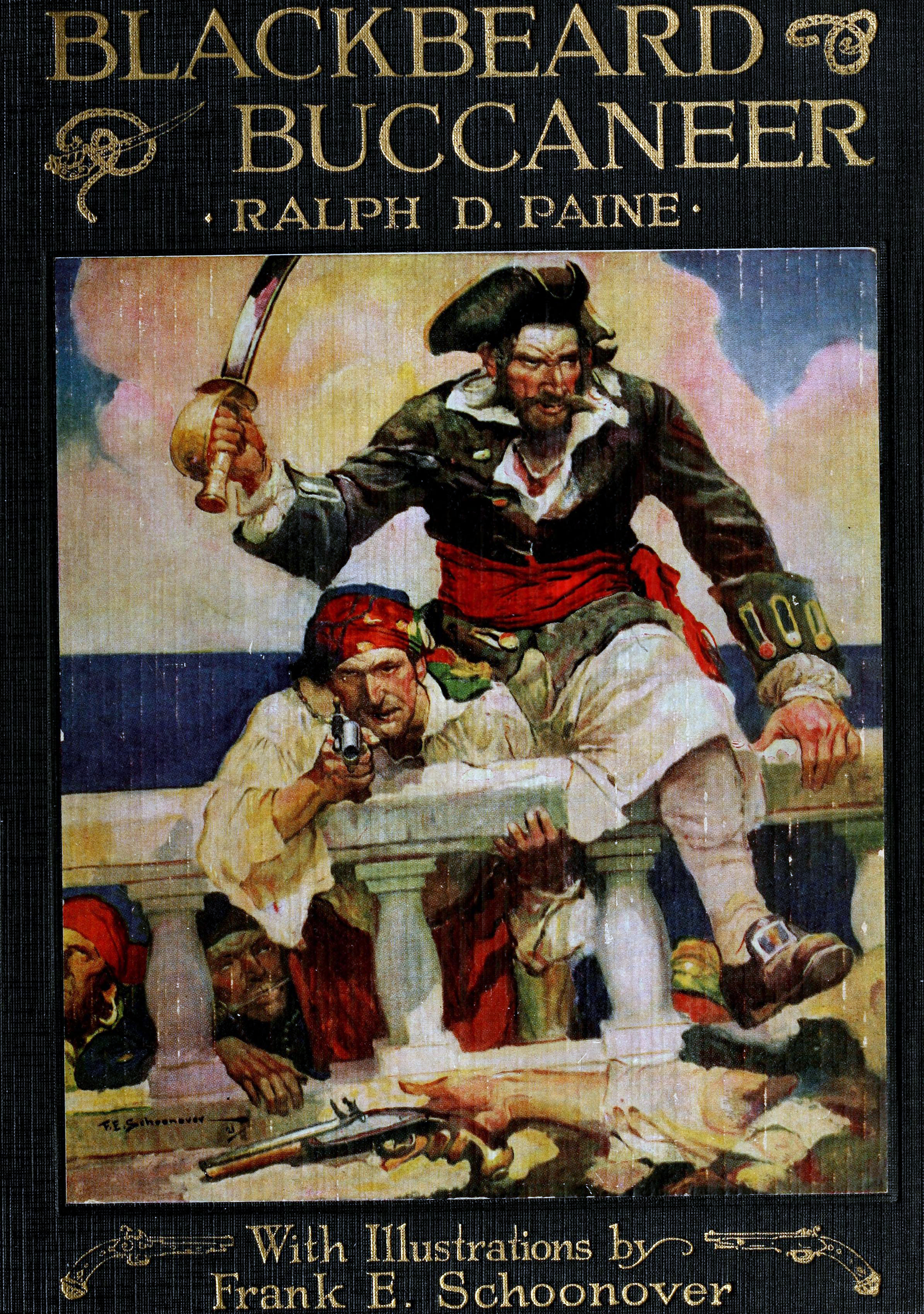
Cover by Frank Schoonover (1922).

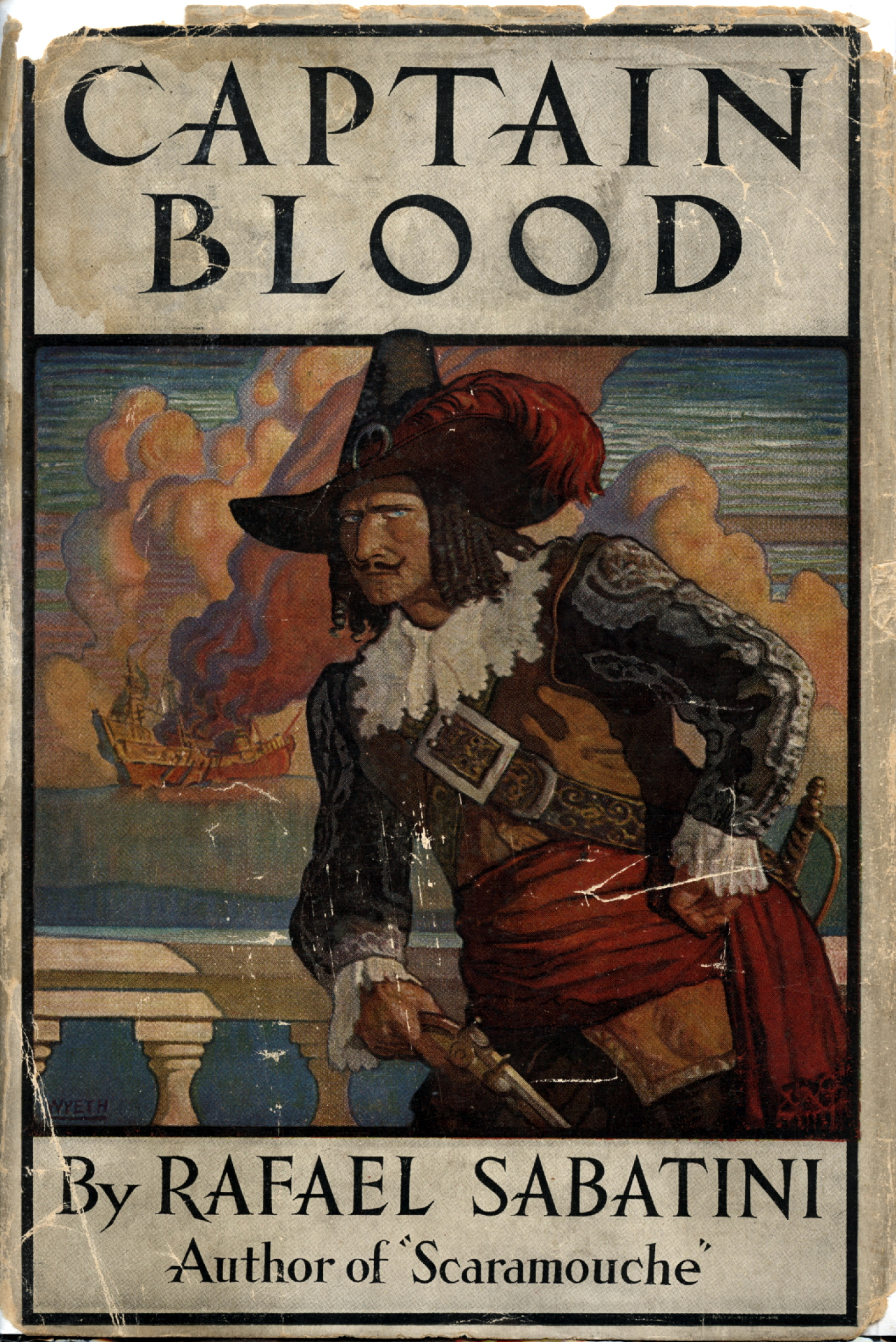
Cover by N. C. Wyeth (1922).

The Black Pirate project was born more than three years before it was filmed, in the context of a literary vogue on the theme of pirates in the United States, which is self-integrated in a "Peter Pan business culture" marked by the desire of young urban whites not to grow up, to do their job like a game, and to be able to attribute their social success to their eternal youthfulness. This vogue resulted in the development of a visual stereotype of the "mythical pirate", a mixture of a sixteenth-century sailor and a gypsy with a scarf on his head, an earring and a scarf at his waist, created by Howard Pyle, who trained and inspired cartoonists Maxfield Parrish and N. C. Wyeth.

From the outset, Fairbanks associated the project of a pirate film with that of a color film. Before the release of The Toll of the Sea, the actor and producer had been skeptical about the interest of this type of process, declaring that it was only a "fetish" and that adding color would be as useless as "putting lipstick on Venus de Milo". (Note: The formula was adopted in March 1926 by Albert Parker, who presented it to the opponents of natural color films and linked it to a quip by Joseph Schenck, likening these films to "Italian weddings," supposedly characterized by salmon roses, bright reds, and forget-me-not blues. A few years later, the image of lipstick is used in a similar critical context by Mary Pickford to disparage the talking cinema, echoing the earlier use of colorful imagery to mock cinematic innovations.) After attending the premiere of The Toll of the Sea, he contacted Kalmus and expressed interest in the process. He then linked the project of a pirate film to that of a color film on a regular basis. He declared in January 1923: "All the pirate movies I've seen are disappointing because they're in black and white. Color is the theme and flavor of piracy".

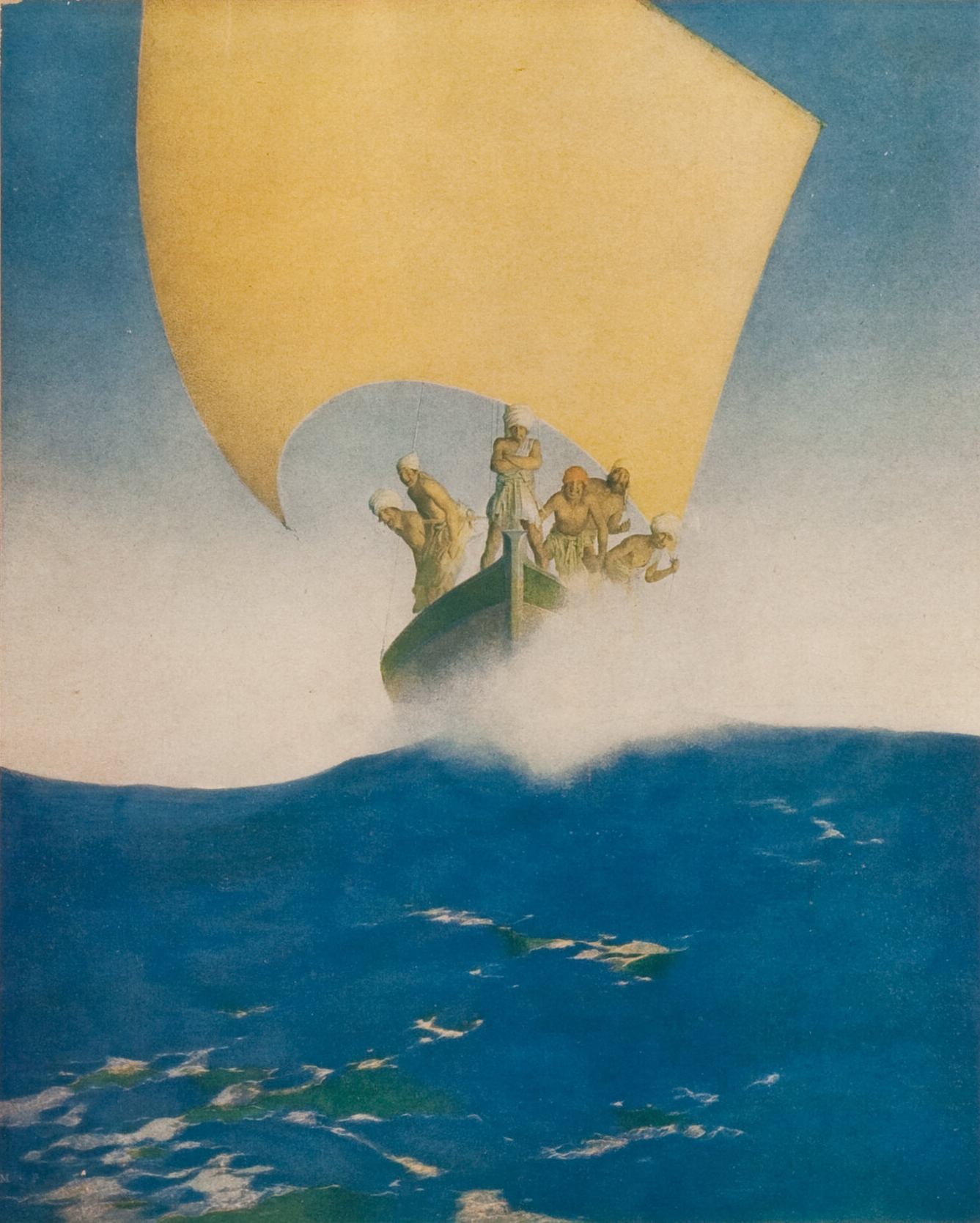
Illustration by Maxfield Parrish (1919).

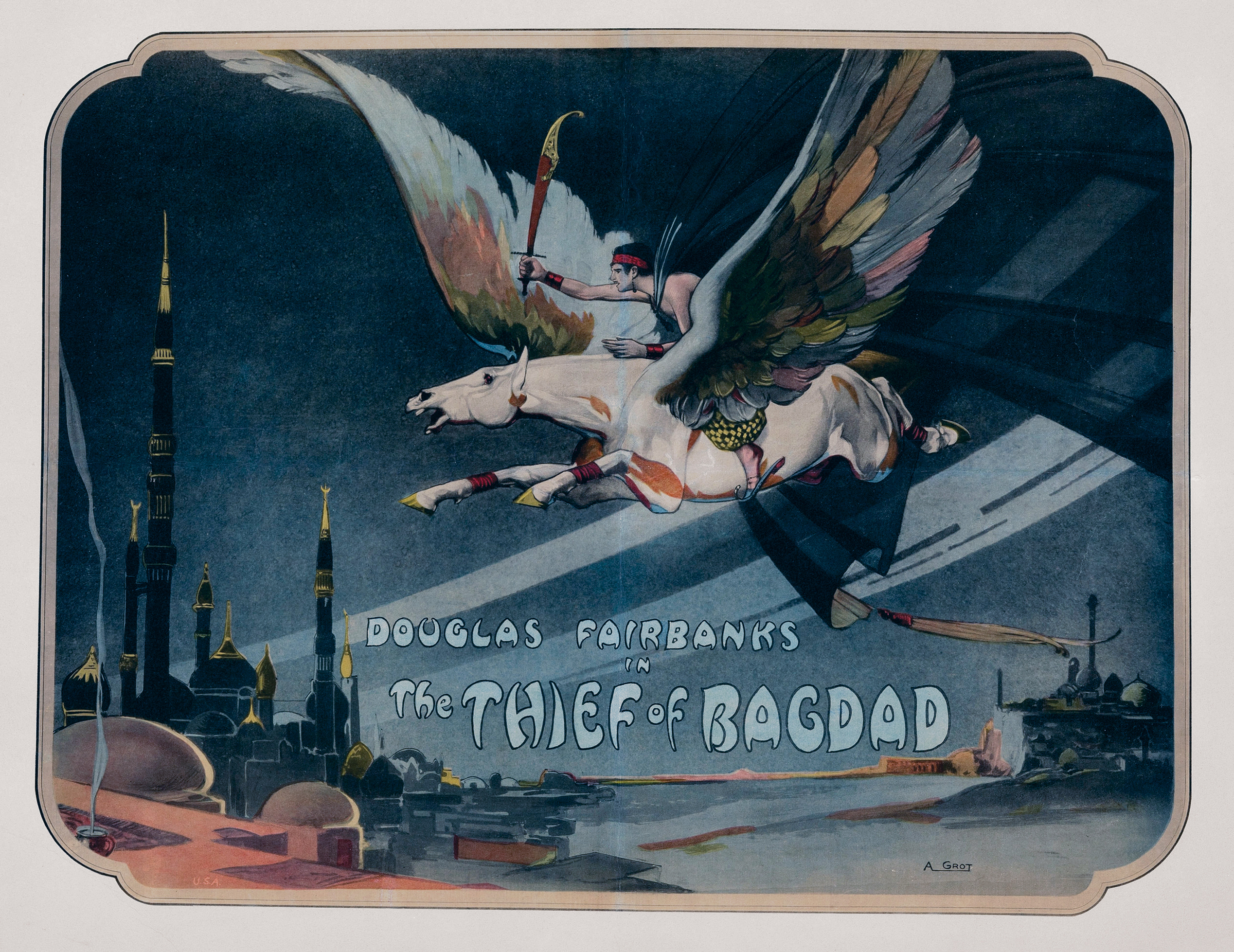
Poster by Anton Grot.

Prologue to The Thief of Bagdad (1924).

In 1923, Fairbanks stated that the film would not be shot in the shades of red and green that he believed had spoiled other productions, but in pastel shades in the style of a Maxfield Parrish painting. This would create a very different reference to what would be the chromatic tone of The Black Pirate, but which evokes the dyed prologue of The Thief of Baghdad. Maxfield Parrish, one of the most famous American illustrators of the 1920s, was above all known for the use of a "fairytale" cobalt blue — Parrish Blue — Surrounded by pastel tones, as in the illustration opposite, as well as for his joyful treatment of children's stories that earned him the nickname "Peter Pan of illustration". Fairbanks first hired him as artistic director for The Thief of Baghdad before abandoning this collaboration, as the painter's projects proved to be unfeasible. The film was nevertheless presented as imbued with the "feeling of a rich Parrish blue", a quality particularly evident in its poster, which is often erroneously attributed to this artist.

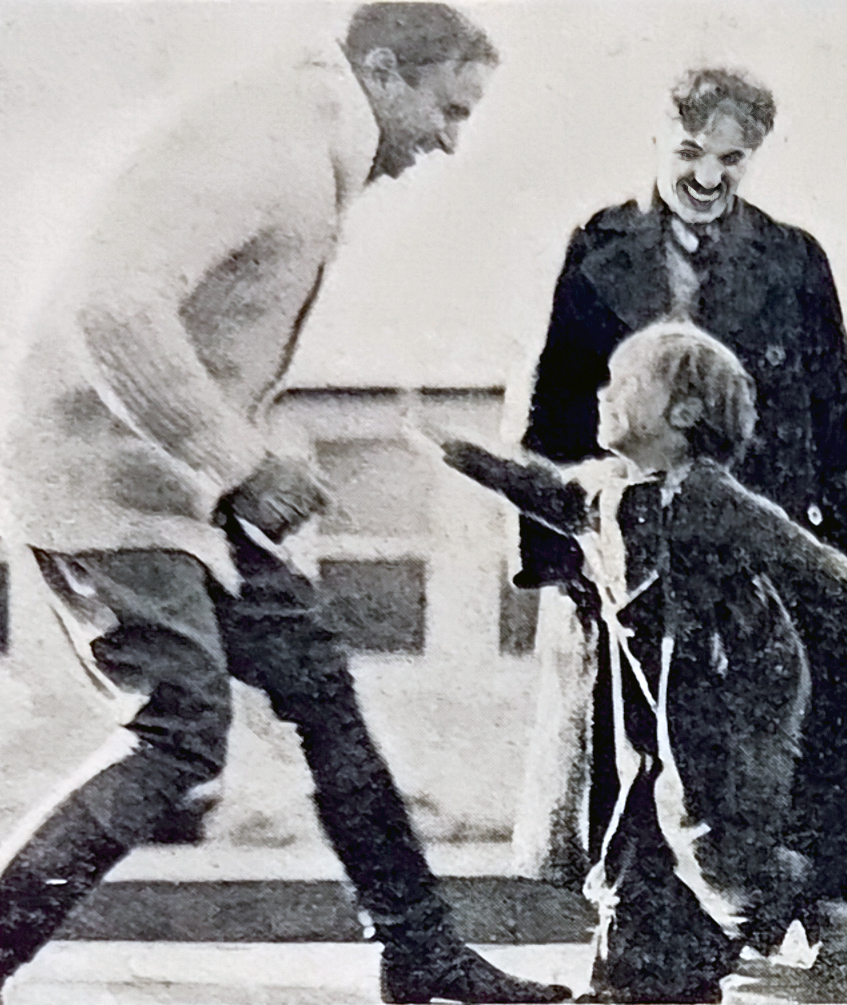
Fairbanks and Jackie Coogan during the filming of The Kid (1921).

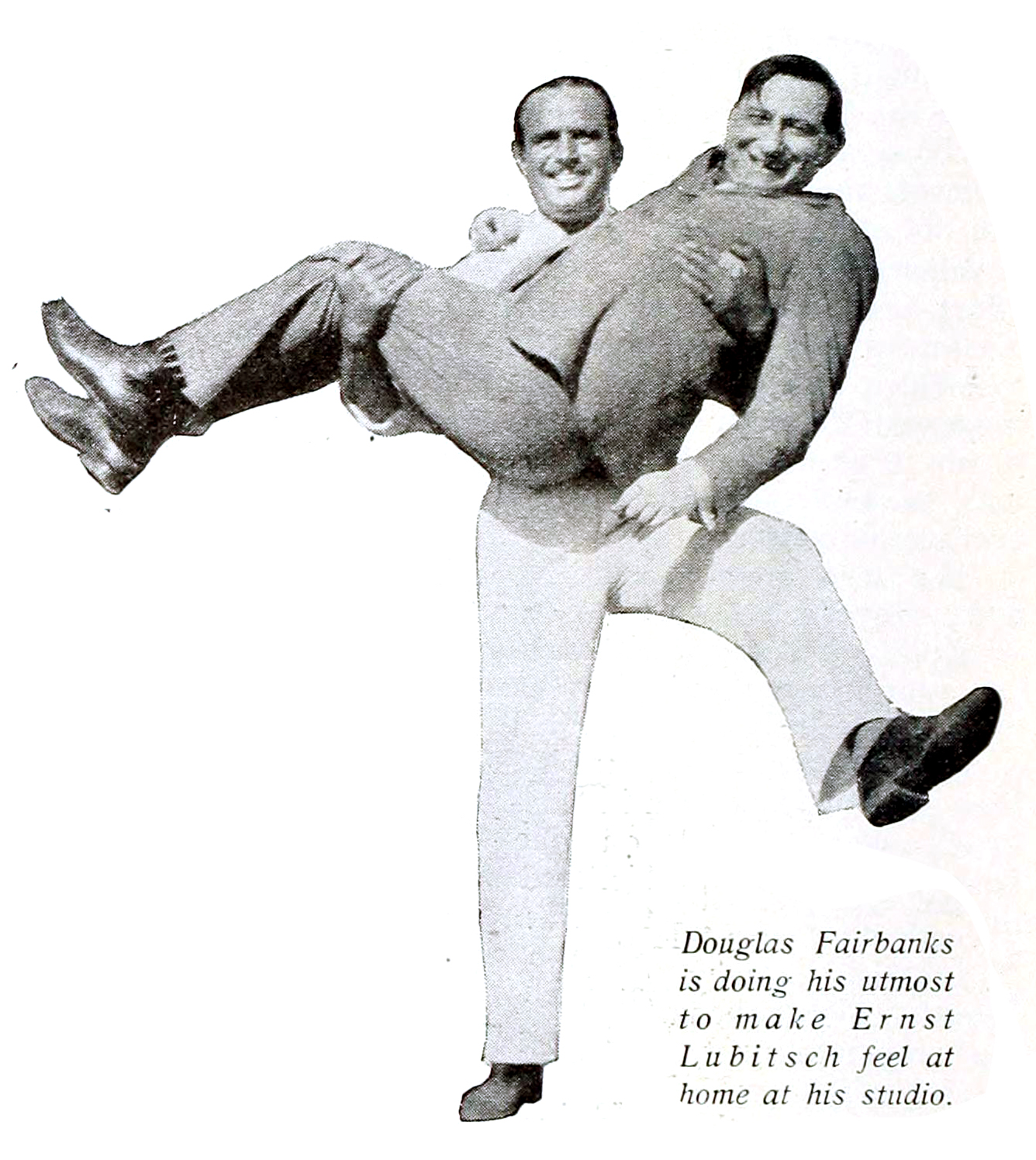
Fairbanks "bringing" Ernst Lubitsch to Hollywood (1923).

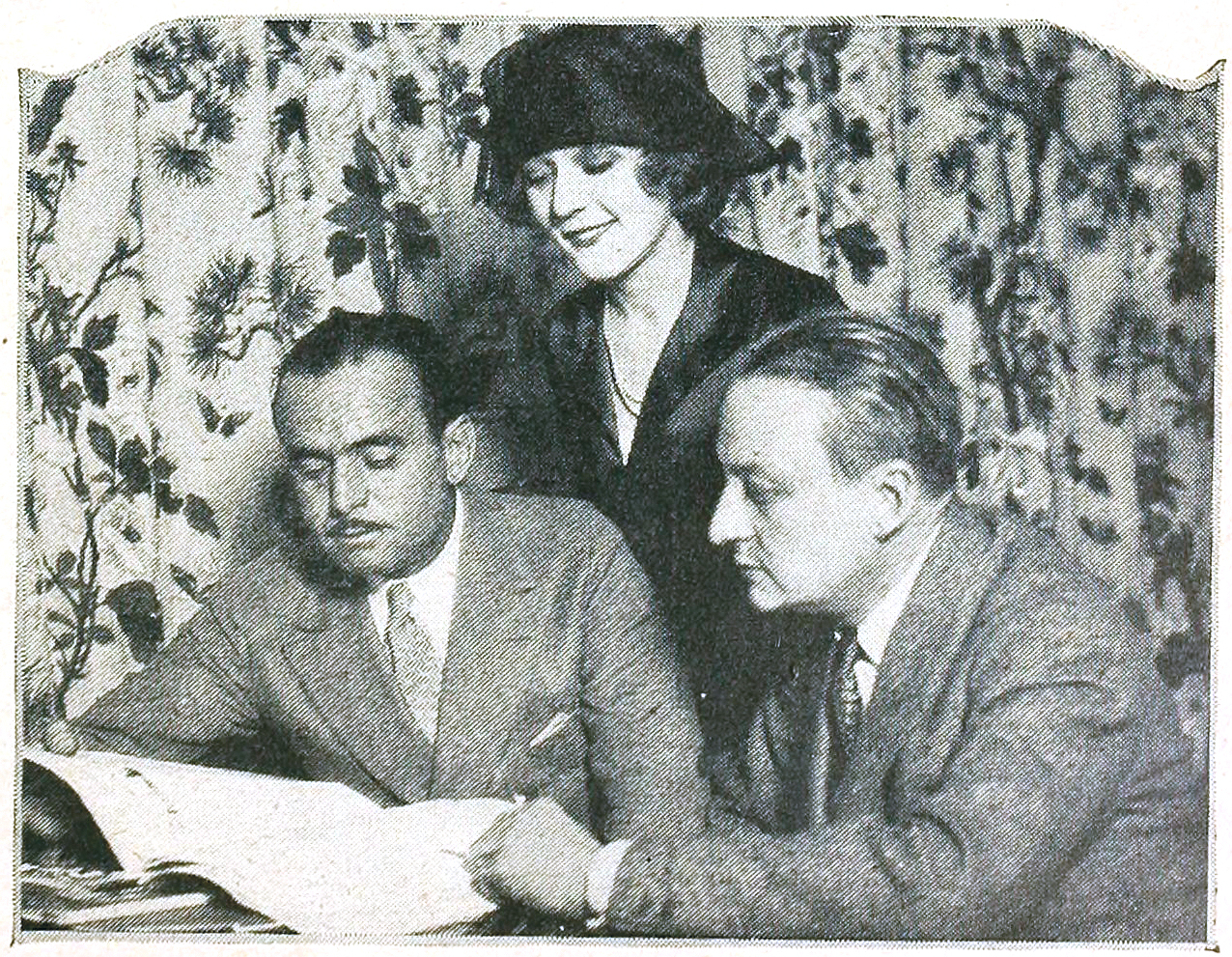
Fairbanks, Pickford, and Knoblock working on the screenplay for the film in 1923.

Jackie Coogan would later claim to have given Fairbanks the idea of The Black Pirate in 1922, praising Howard Pyle's Book of Pirates that he had just read, from which Douglas Fairbanks immediately drew a first draft of the screenplay, according to him. At the time, Ernst Lubitsch was considered a specialist in historical films in costume. In November 1922, after being invited to Hollywood by Fairbanks' wife, Mary Pickford, Lubitsch stated that he was going to direct Fairbanks in a "swashbuckling romance of the time of the pirates" of which the actor, for his part, said he still had only a vague idea. There was talk of entrusting the writing of the screenplay to Edward Knoblock and the female lead to Evelyn Brent. At the end of 1922, Fairbanks was obsessed with the pirate film being shown, and Mary Pickford gave him an old model of a galleon for Christmas.

In 1923, the film press reported many rumors about the imminent start of production of the pirate film. At the beginning of the year, it was stated that Lubitsch would directed it; then, that this task would be entrusted to Raoul Walsh, as Lubitsch had begun work on Rosita with Mary Pickford. (Note: According to Gary Carey, Fairbanks was still considering entrusting the direction of his pirate film to Lubitsch after the shooting of Rosita, and only "script issues" led to the project's delay.) A little later, it was revealed that Fairbanks had hired Dwight Franklin, a diorama designer considered a specialist in piracy; as the start of filming is neared, the working title became The Black Pirate, and was originally to be a big-budget sea film set in the Middle Ages.

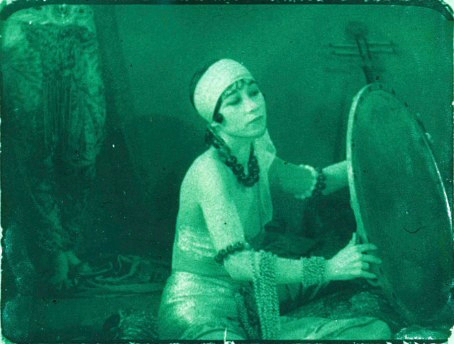
Technicolor test during the filming of The Thief of Bagdad, whose director of photography, Arthur Edeson, conducted experiments in color. (Note: Arnold Höllriegel also reported color tests were made during the filming of Don Q, Son of Zorro)

The press also began reporting on the film that would become The Thief of Baghdad, struggling to distinguish between the two projects. According to one source, Fairbanks led the pirate film at the same time as another with an "Arab setting", while for another, he was working on a single movie, whose oriental title and plot conceal a screenplay borrowed from Rafael Sabatini's Captain Blood. (Note: According to Fairbanks biographer Tracey Goessel, this Variety article reveals neither a blend between the pirate film project and The Thief of Bagdad, nor a borrowing from Sabatini's novel, but rather the difficulty journalists faced in keeping up with the incessant changes to Fairbanks' project.) A few weeks later, Fairbanks explained that he decided to incorporate some of the ideas developed for his pirate film into the oriental-themed one, which Walsh would direct. The pirate film was postponed, in particular, due to the number of shoots underway in this genre (including Peter Pan, Strangers of the Night, The Sea Hawk, and Captain Blood), as well as because the available color processes did not satisfy Fairbanks. At the time, he hesitated between Prizma Color and Technicolor. Although the latter was more successful and had an advantage in terms of sharpness and speed of shooting, it lacked in terms of color fidelity: "reddish-brown dominates, light yellows, and blues are not rendered as by the Prizma process", which was problematic if you wanted to get a palette like Maxfield Parrish's. Fairbanks experimented with both processes, and recognized that the problems are both logistical and chromatic. It did not exist before 1924 in California as a laboratory to develop and print copies of color films, Prizma's in Brooklyn, and Technicolor's in Boston, which led to a fifteen-day wait for the results of the Prizma tests. Additionally, printing capacities were still limited. Albert Parker, the director of The Black Pirate, confirmed in 1926 that Fairbanks had only given up shooting the film in 1923 because he could not do it in color. (Note: Historian Nancy Kauffman, after examining fragments of Technicolor test bits in The Thief of Baghdad, wondered if Fairbanks was planning to shoot this film in color, or if he was taking advantage of this production to prepare his upcoming pirate film)

=== Pre-production ===
By 1925, the context had changed enough to lead Fairbanks to consider producing his color pirate film. Such a big-budget film in full color was a boon for Technicolor, but a significant risk for Fairbanks.

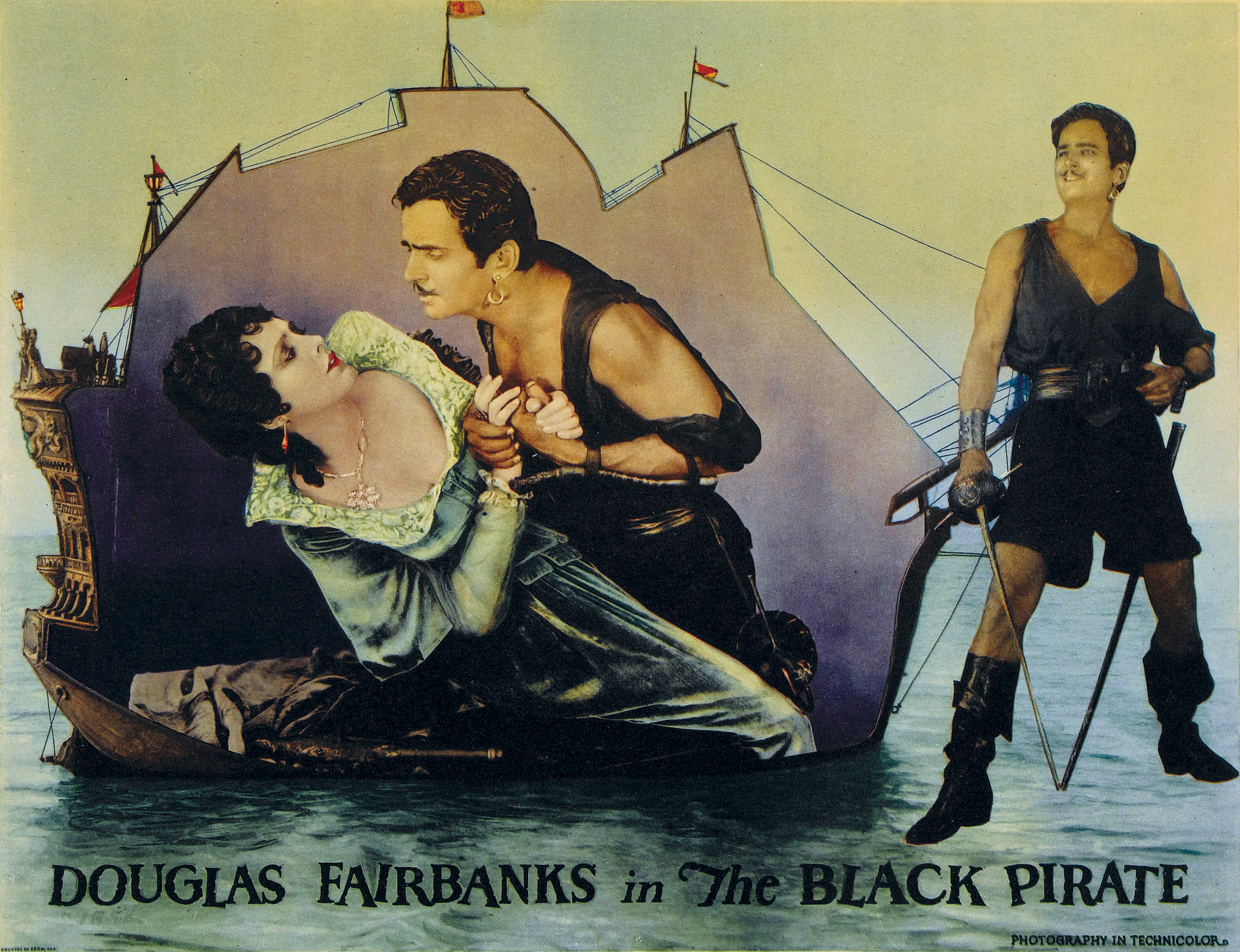
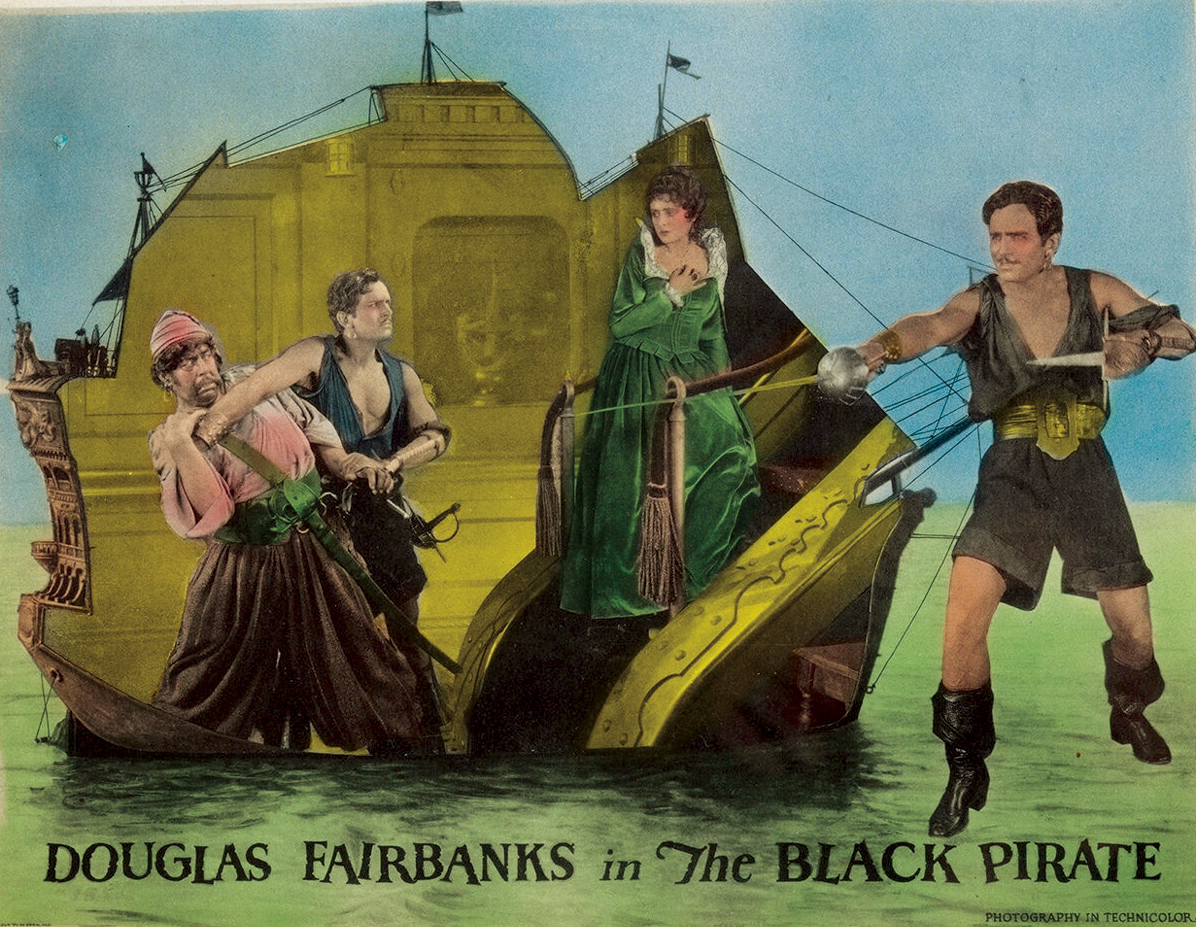
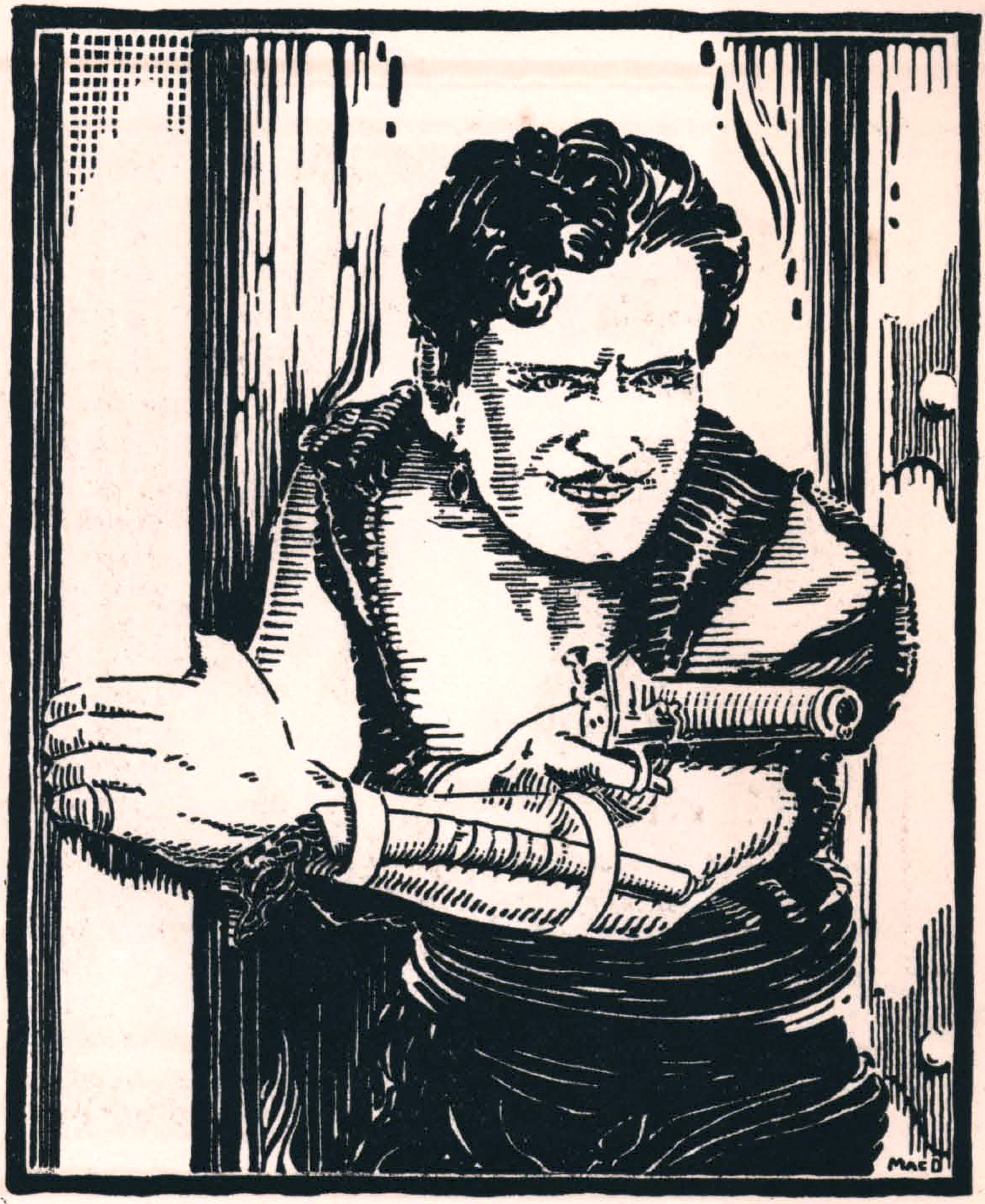
Production photos from the film suggesting a fictional colorful space that the viewer looks at and in which they are also immersed, like the child absorbed in the play space of a picture book. The use of wood engravings in the film's program enhances the evocation of illustrated children's books.

From the birth of the project of a pirate film, in 1922, Fairbanks affirmed that color was "the theme and the flavor of piracy", because pirates "suggest colour to the imagination" and that it would be "impossible to film a story about them in a satisfactory way in black and white". Joshua Yumibe explains this function of color by drawing on Walter Benjamin's analyses of color copper engraving in children's books. According to Benjamin, color opens up a space of play that "immerses the imagination in itself" by promoting what he calls an "innervation", a "mimetic imitation of the work by the spectator". According to this analysis, the function of color is not to create an illusion of reality, but a sensual experience of enchantment, of "stereoscopic depth". (Note: This analysis stems from that of Tom Gunning on the attractive function assigned to color since the early cinema, with Gunning arguing that the added "sensual intensity" brought by color in early cinema contributed to its function as a "signifier of the imaginary".)

Despite this intention, Fairbanks, like other American filmmakers of his time, believed that color was a distraction that presented, in addition to the risk of tiring the audience, the risk of "taking all attention away from the acting and the facial expression, by staining and confusing the action." He thus shared a suspicion of the sensual, spectacular, metaphorical dimension, even ornamental color. He evokes what he calls "conventional doubts" about it, in particular the idea that it "militates against the simplicity and direct action" of black and white. These doubts are notably those of Cecil B. DeMille, who suggests that color should be discreet to avoid interfering with the narrative. According to DeMille, the viewer's eye cannot "bear too much tension," and the variety of colors can distract attention from the story.

This prejudice about color dates back in particular to a commercial conflict in the 1900s and 1910s between Pathé's stencil-colored films and those of its American competitors in black and white, in the context of specifically American cultural developments, such as the rise of half-tone printing at the expense of chromolithography and that of a "virilist" aesthetic of authenticity to the detriment of a supposedly feminine delectation for imitation. This aesthetic translates into a preference for plausible play, as opposed to "histrionic" play, and a moderate use of color, which does not distract from the narrative, to bring a psychological rather than an optical realism. (Note: This approach is summed up by D. W. Griffith in the following terms: "I do not believe that reproducing natural colors is often desirable. It would push realism too far since the things of life are not always beautiful in color, and reproducing them as they are would often be less artistic than in black and white. The images would just be a fleeting series of chromos, and color would frequently dominate the story ... It is possible, however, to use a certain amount of color in the manner of an impressionist painter to suggest the mood of a scene.")

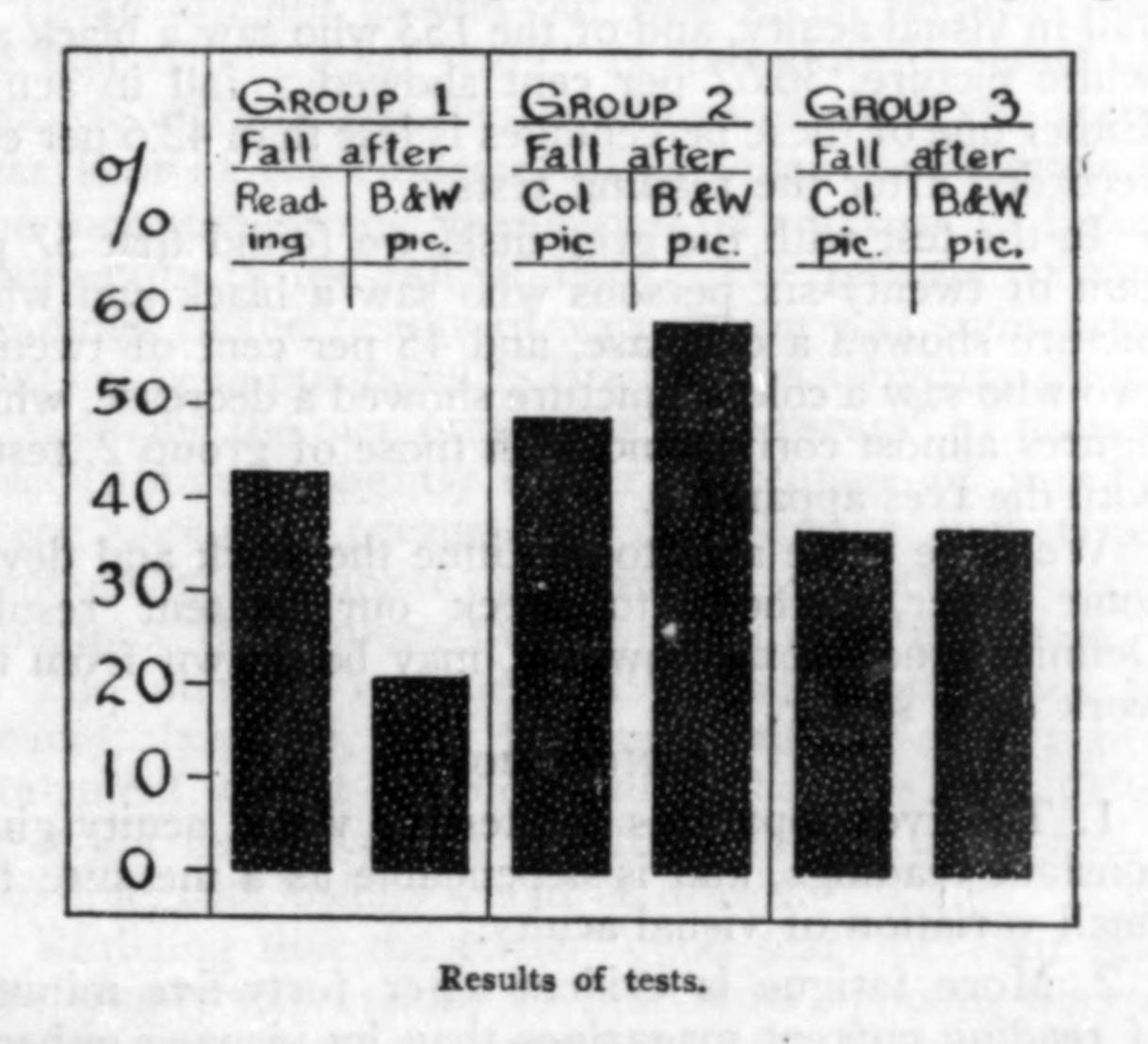
Table of results from the study by Irvine and Weymann.

In May 1925, before confirming his decision and on the advice of Kalmus, Fairbanks therefore commissioned two university professors of ophthalmology, Ray Irvine and M. F. Weymann, to carry out a study of the comparative effect on visual fatigue of a color film (Wanderer of the Wasteland) and a black and white film (Don Q, Son of Zorro). (Note: This research was set against the backdrop of a lasting concern regarding the potentially harmful consequences of cinematic image instability, which has led to the description of ocular disorders referred to in French as "cinématophtalmie" and in English as "picturitis", and to the recommendation of wearing tinted glasses during the screening or administering cocaine-based eye drops after the screening.) It emerges that, contrary to a prejudice of the time related to the colored fringes of the first films in additive synthesis, not only is it more tiring to read a newspaper for 45 minutes than to watch a film in black and white or color, but in addition, a film in Technicolor is no more tiring for the eyes than a film in black and white and seems on the contrary to be less so. (Note: Psychologist Leonard Troland, who has been Technicolor's director of research since 1925, based on the results of this study, to estimate that eye fatigue is inversely proportional to the artificiality (unnaturalness) of the representation, which imposes a "compensation by the nervous system", and that it is, therefore, normal for the film in natural colors to lead to a reduction in this discomfort. However, these analyses are disputed by some operators who note that spectators complain of eye fatigue)

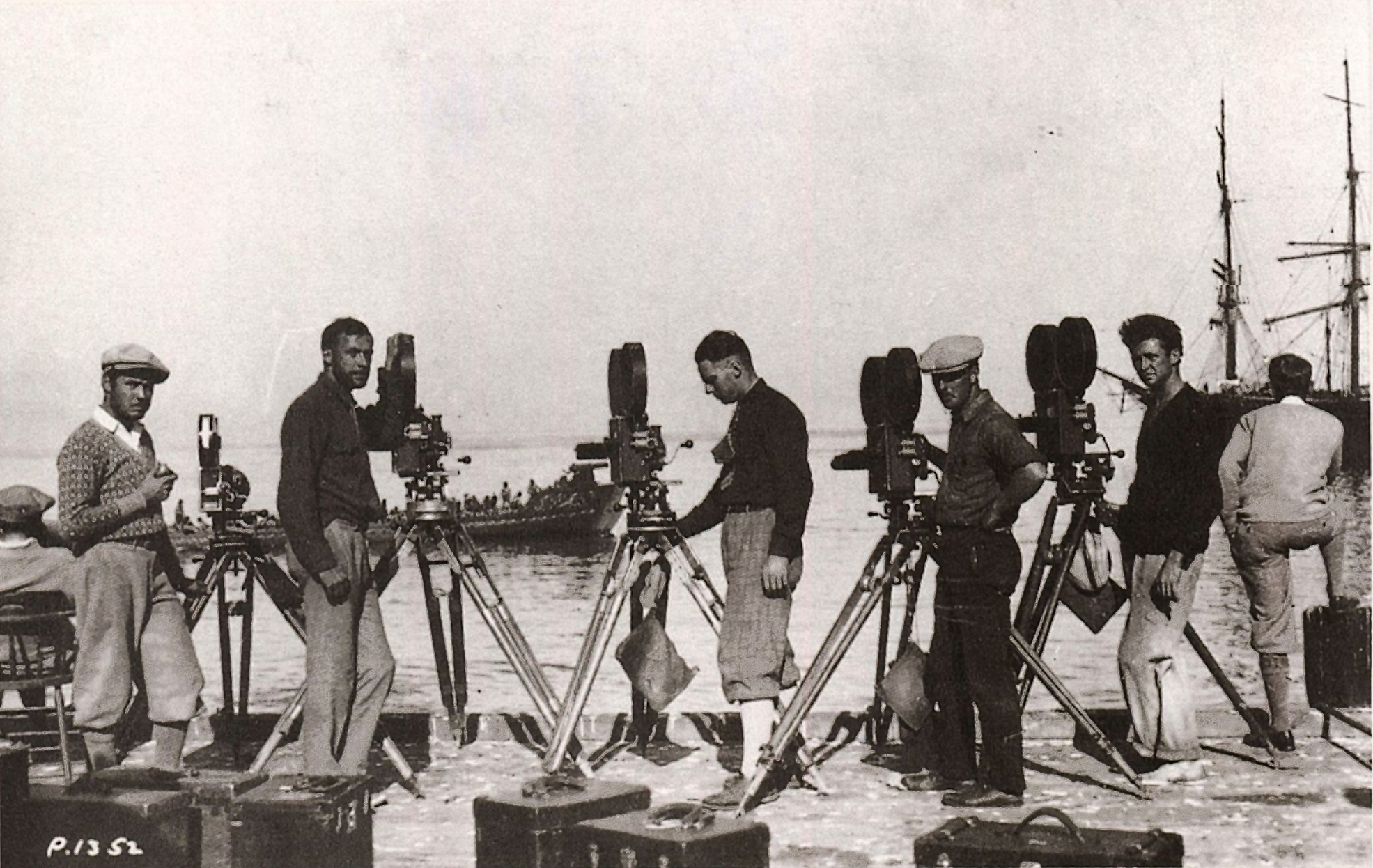
Fairbanks secured four of the seven existing Technicolor cameras for filming.

In July 1925, Kalmus traveled to Hollywood for two weeks to talk with Fairbanks, his brother Robert Fairbanks, and their production manager, Theodore Reed. They argued that the film was going to cost a million dollars. They requested guarantees from Technicolor regarding its ability to deliver prints of satisfactory quality. To resolve the problem, the engineering firm Kalmus, Comstock & Wescott, Inc., which had developed all of Technicolor's industrial processes, undertook to provide the color prints in the event of a Technicolor failure. Fairbanks also won a special award for color film as well as the provision of four of the seven Technicolor cameras in existence at the time, so that each shot could be filmed with two Technicolor cameras placed side by side and equipped with lenses of the same focal length, while two other cameras were ready to replace them in case of a problem.

Director Albert Parker, sharing the "chromophobic" prejudice of Hollywood, initially had an adverse reaction to the project of a color film: "When [Fairbanks] told me he was going to do The Black Pirate in color, I thought, 'Oh my God... The color is appalling... At the time, we did The Glorious Adventure, horrible."

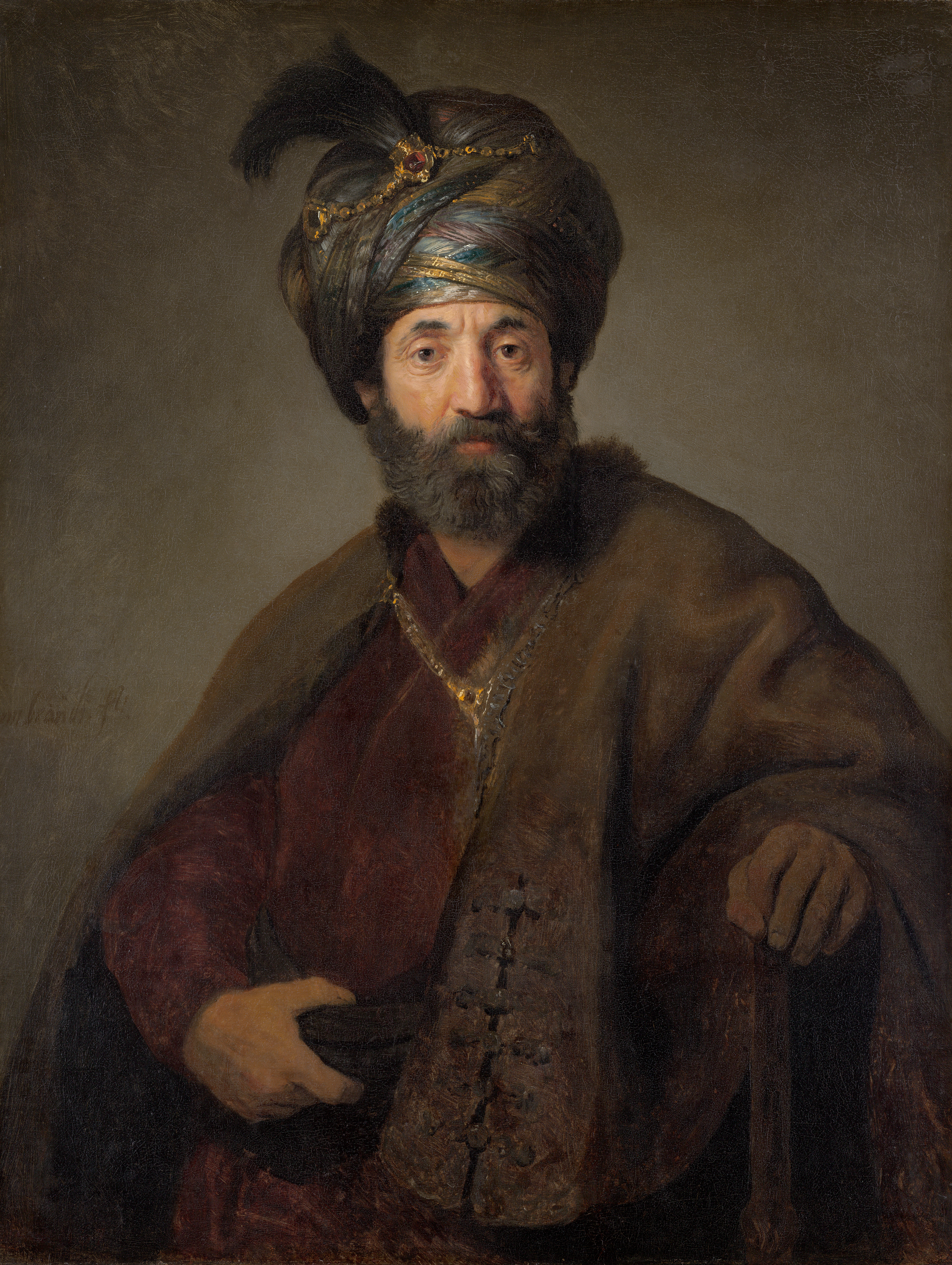
Presumed portrait of the Jewish privateer Samuel Pallache by Rembrandt.

However, by visiting an exhibition of paintings by "old masters" at the Huntington Library in Pasadena, Rembrandt in particular, Parker found a solution to prevent the film from looking like a "cheap postcard". (Note: Color cinema has had complex relationships with color postcards since its inception. The first colorists in cinema were artisans trained in coloring postcards who used the same aniline dyes, "bright and intrusive" In the 1920s, the development of cheap color postcards in chromolithography led to a rejection of this "vulgarizing pictorialism", including from filmmakers like Fairbanks, whose projects, according to Neil Harris, partake in the same "extended pictorialism of mass culture".) He brought to Fairbanks, who agreed with him: "no bright colors, but calm, mixed and toned tones," so that the viewer is not even aware of the coloring. In particular, Fairbanks is said to have noticed, on examination of Rembrandt's paintings in the Huntington collection, a subordination of the colors to the harmony and unity of the overall composition, the saturated tones being masked and harmonized by a neutral shadow in such a way that no stain of color attracted the attention but the only overall impression is that of restraint. (Note: Film historian Richard Koszarski notes that references to Rembrandt were frequent among filmmakers of the time, in particular Cecil B. DeMille, who used the notion of Rembrandt lighting, and that it was invoked for many pictorial effects, in particular by Henry Sharp, the cinematographer of Fairbanks' film, who claims to have studied their lighting effects at the Metropolitan in 1928. Richard Misek, for his part, points out that the reference to the great painters, in particular Rembrandt, is supposed to reinforce contradictory theses on the subject of color, for example in Natalie Kalmus, who invokes Rembrandt to justify a "law of emphasis" according to which color in a film should not draw attention to itself but to an essential element for the narrative.) Fairbanks contrasted Rembrandt, who "was mainly concerned with theatrical compositions which he presented in discreet tones, like a golden brown", with Gainsborough, who could all the more easily be a great colorist because his subjects were at rest. He was not to suggest movement.

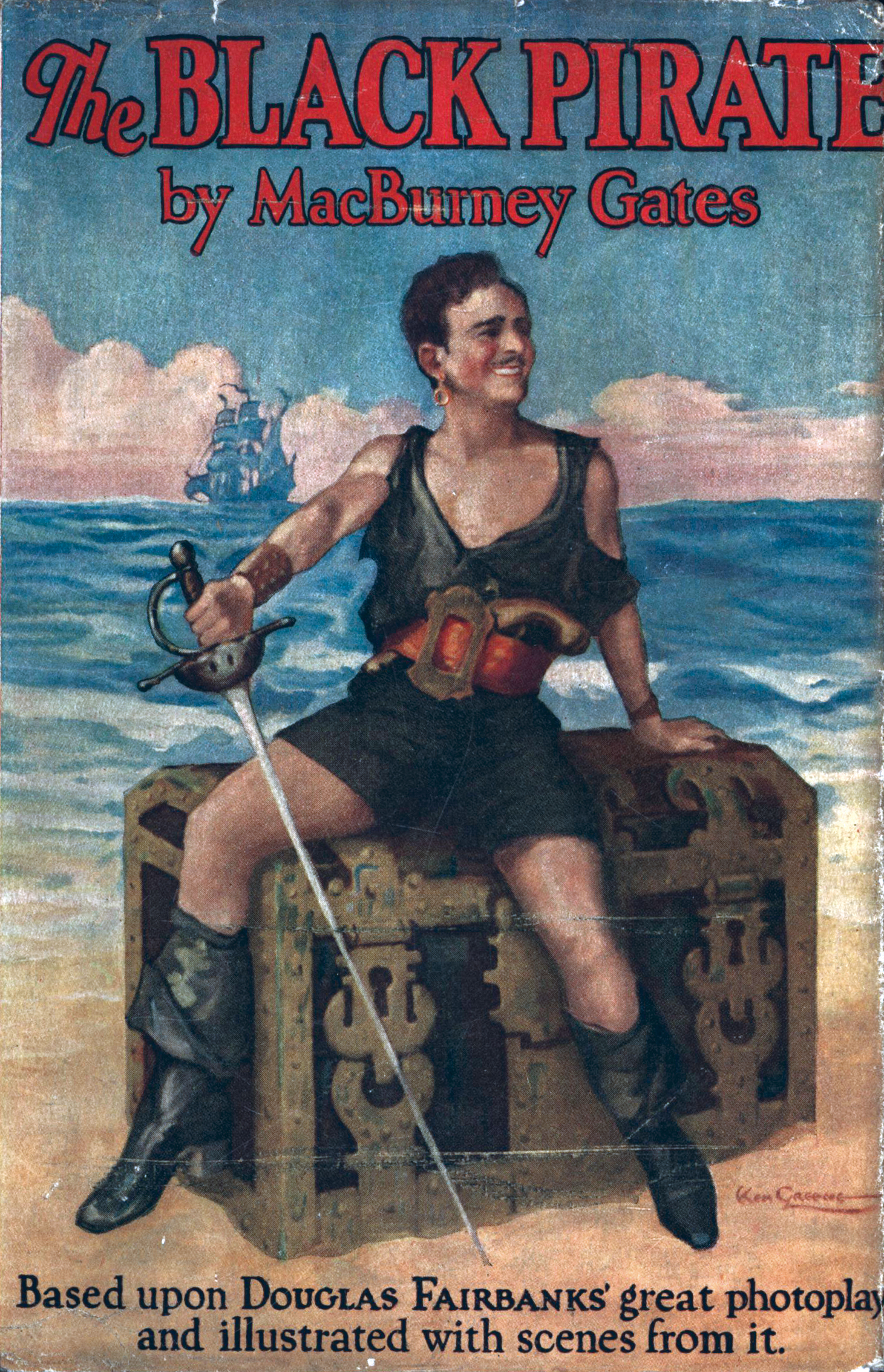
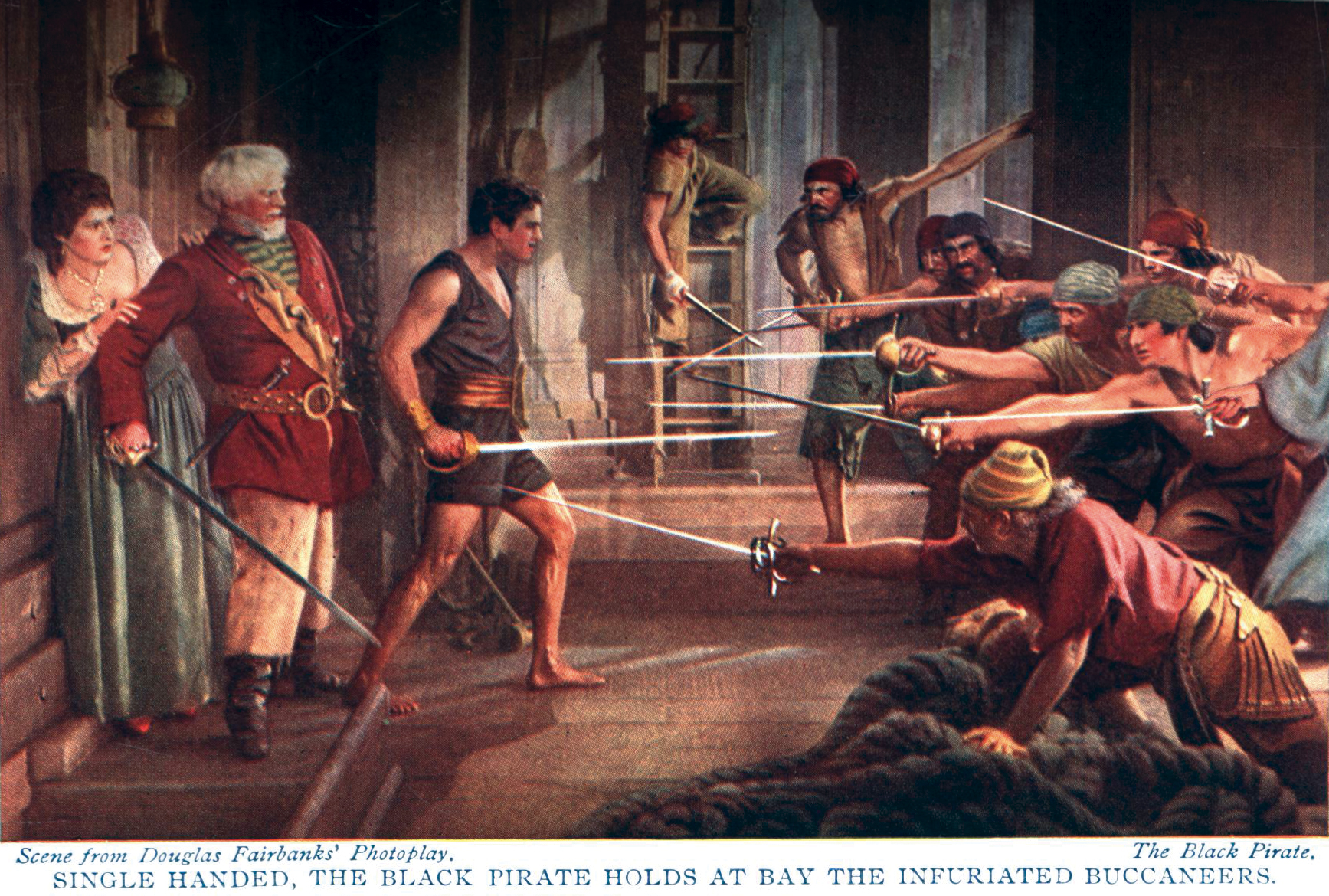
Cover and illustration of a book derived from the film. Its illustrations, supposedly faithful to the colors of the film, actually involves a retrospective transformation of the original by applying the illustrative codes of the illustrated books that inspired it to the film.

Despite these references to the paintings of the "great masters", which were frequently taken up by Fairbanks' communication, the film's critics spoke more about the sparing use of bright colors in favor of muted colors, the influence of American illustrators from the Howard Pyle school, in particular Maxfield Parrish.

Technicolor then undertook "tests with six different levels of color, ranging from a level of saturation barely more tinted than black and white to the most saturated rendering of which the Technicolor process was capable", (Note: These exchanges particularly reflect a difference in approach between the technicians at Technicolor, for whom "normal saturation gives the best results", and that of Fairbanks and his team, for whom, according to Troland's expression, the "shock of the transition to color"' is reduced by lower saturation.) at the end of which Fairbanks chose to use a very "restricted" and desaturated palette.

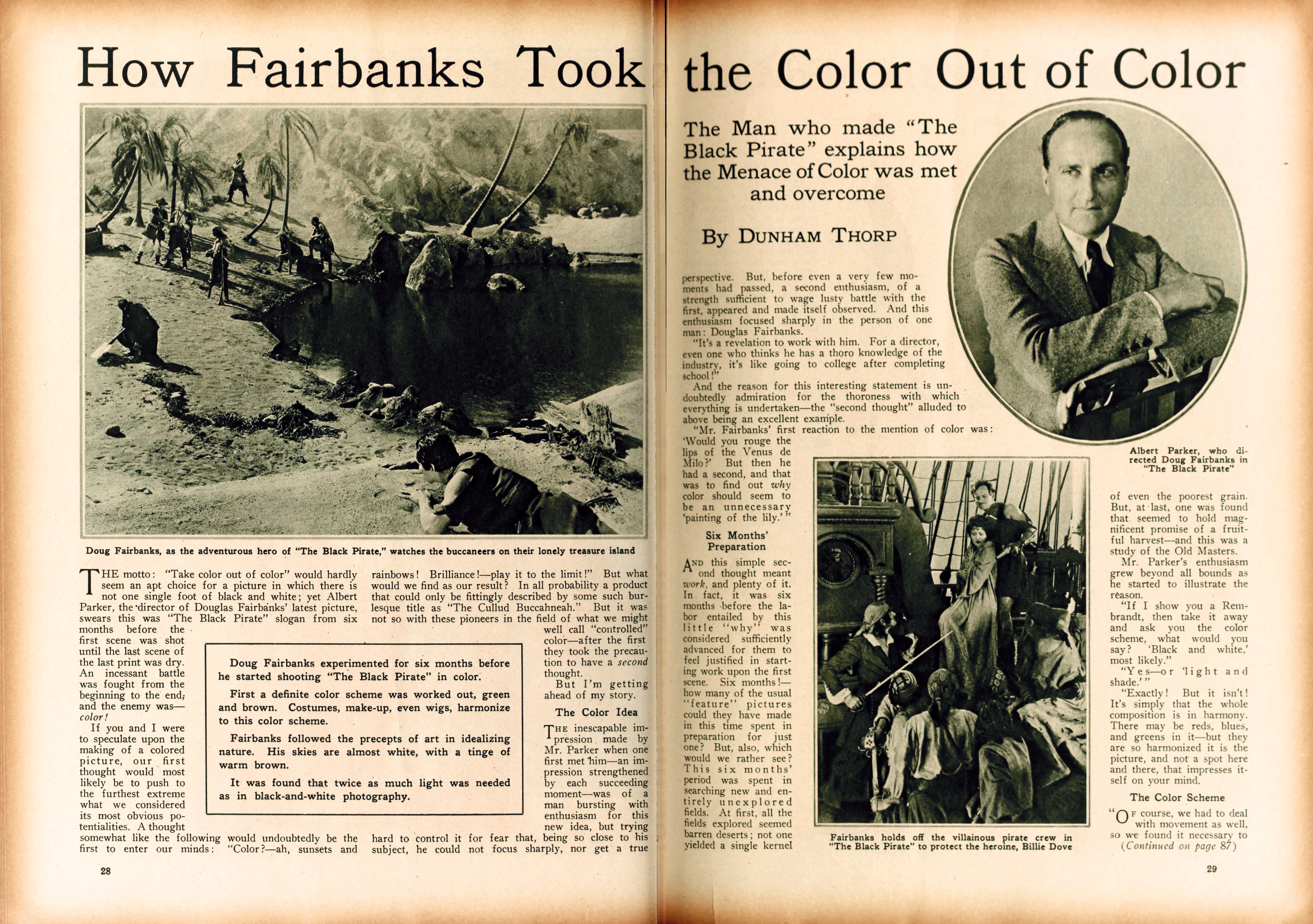
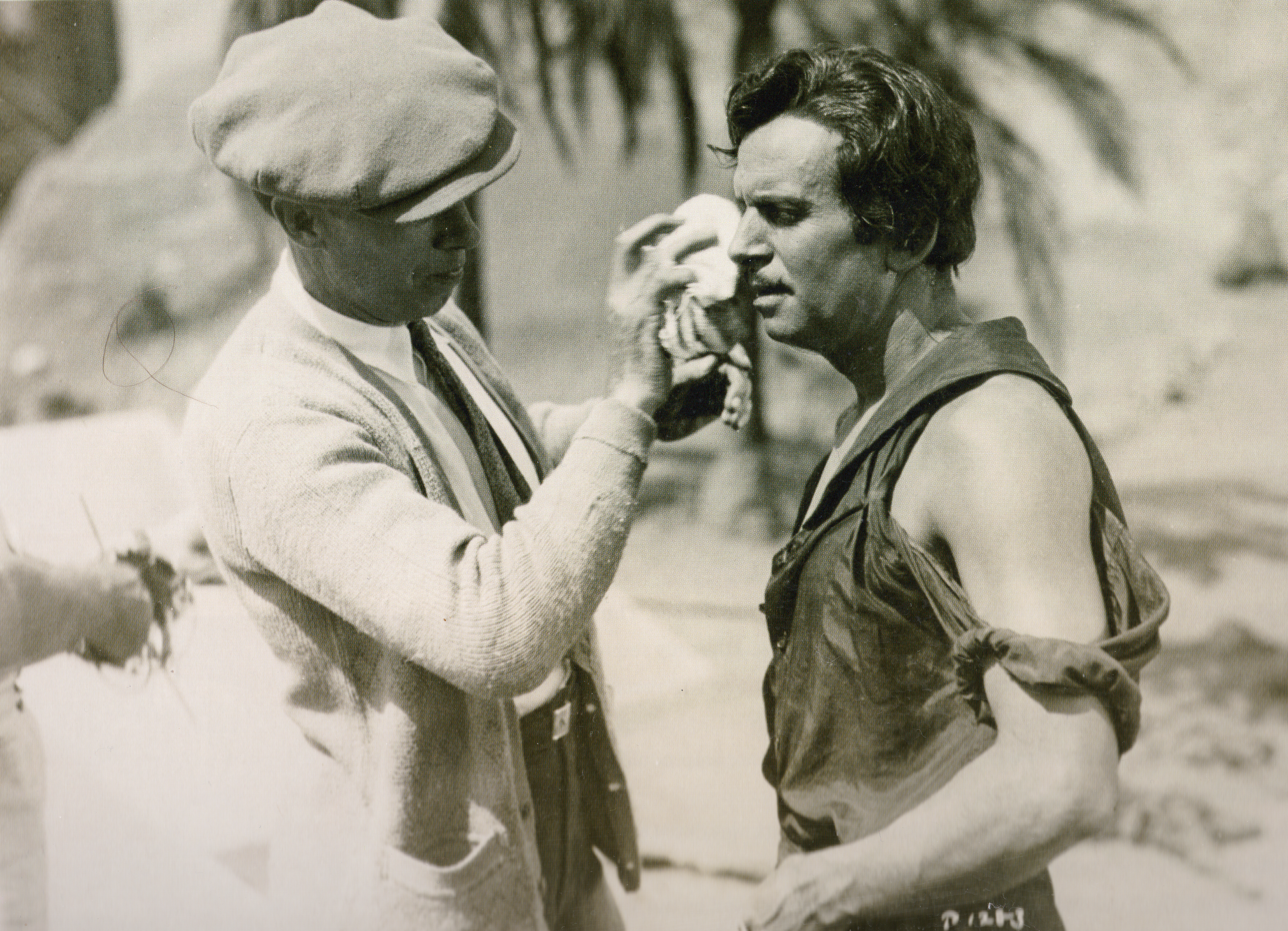
On the left, an article by Dunham Thorp in Motion Picture Classic in 1926 about how the "threat of color" was subdued. On the right, George Westmore applies makeup to Fairbanks. (Note: Tracey Goessel notes that Fairbanks was "afflicted" with a coarse beard and that red powder was needed to neutralize the greenish highlights. According to Paula Marantz Cohen, Fairbanks had a complex relationship with the color of his complexion, perhaps in relation to his Jewish ancestry. In his late films, this complexion is often part of his character, whose nobility is, however, revealed at the exotic end.)

To determine how to restrict the color, how to work without blue and yellow, and how to make sure that the color recorded on the film corresponds to what is desired, Fairbanks' team, with the help of Technicolor technicians, embarked on a preliminary research program that lasted several months. (Note: Four months according to Rudy Behlmer and Bernard Eisenschitz, six months according to Dunham Thorop and John Tibbets costs $125,000 and leads to the exhibition of 18,000 meters of film.)

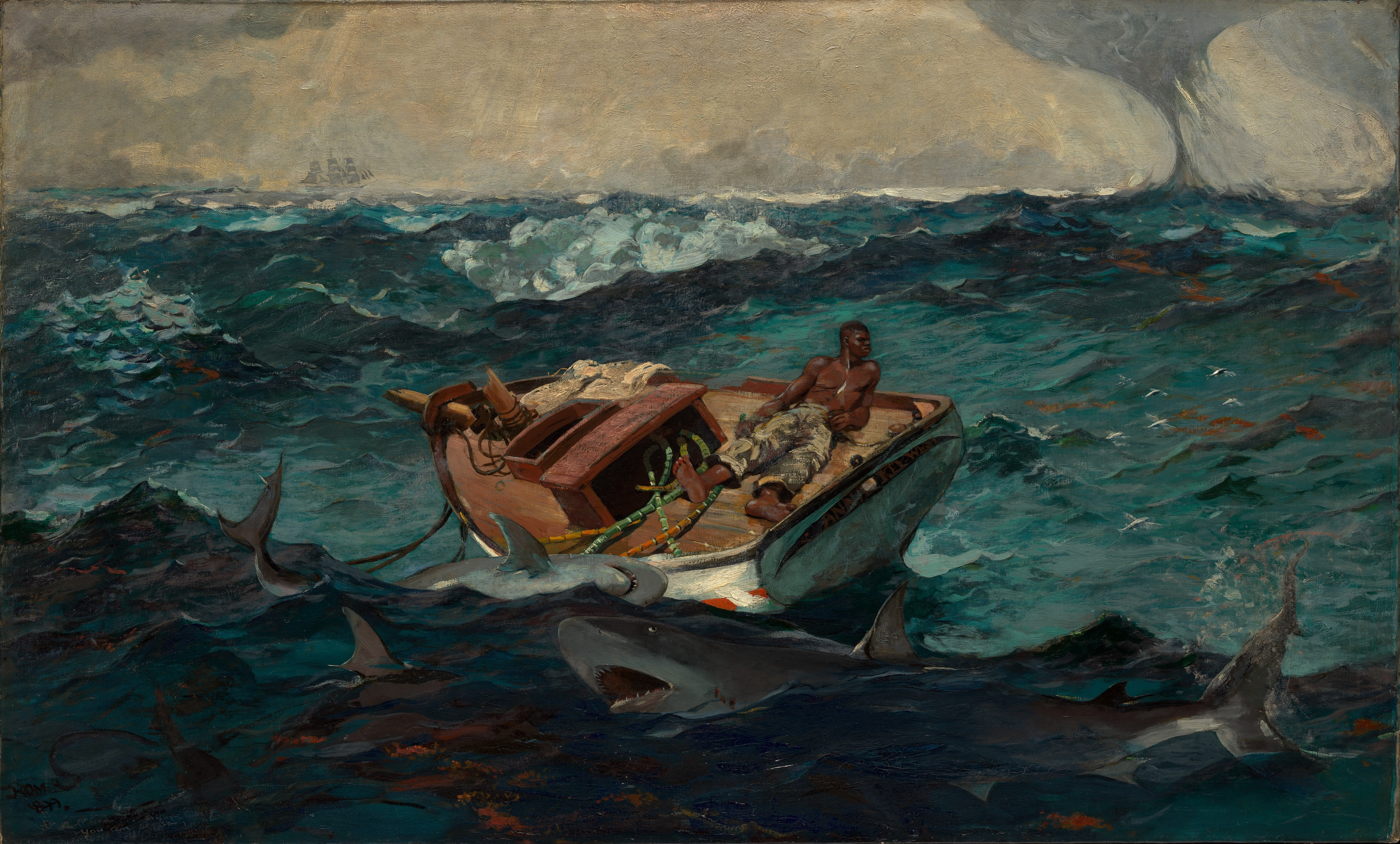
The Gulf Stream by Winslow Homer.

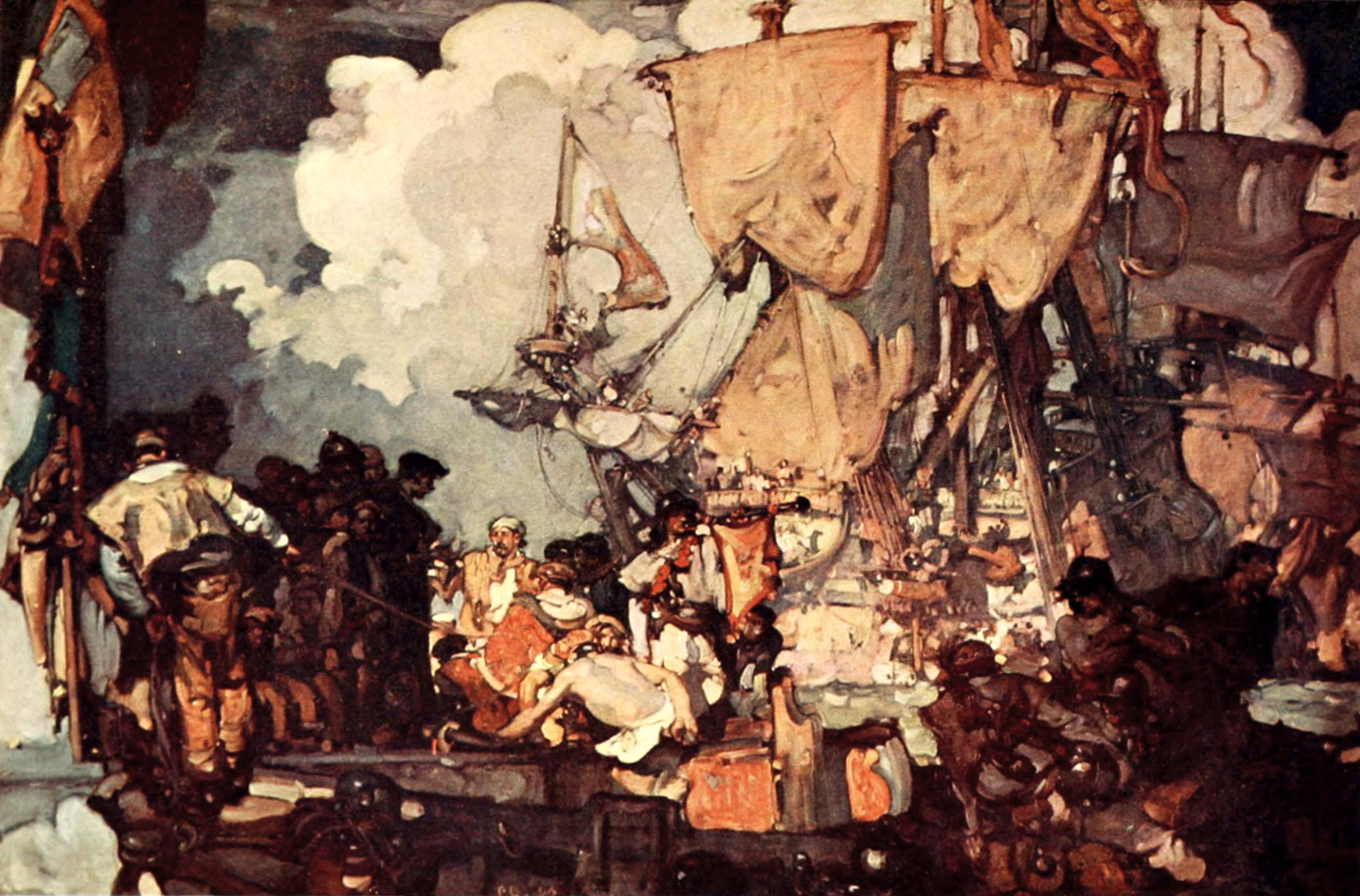
Blake's Return after Capturing the Plate Ships by Frank Brangwyn.

According to Vachel Lindsay, the green-black tones of the nocturnal sea scenes evoke the palette of Winslow Homer and the brown tones of the pirate scenes, that of Frank Brangwyn.

According to Fairbanks, these experiments show that color shooting "records what is presented to it with such avidity that the problem is not to be able to nourish it sufficiently, but to bring the tones back to soft, almost neutral hues." This is why "only dark greens, silvery hues, and chrome yellows are used, on backgrounds of grey-green seas, greyish sand dunes and washed skies in neutral tones", in order to obtain a general effect that is "rather warmth than color, animation rather than true pigmentation", "a softer vision, which envelops the sharp points and contours, … beautifies and glorifies, like the eye of the idealist; in a word, [an] Impressionist painting effect". In February 1926, he declared to a journalist: "Some colors like purple can't be photographed at all. Therefore, the effect of this process is not at all natural, even if it is referred to as natural colors. Our problem was therefore to overcome this artificiality by an artifice."

Sparing use of red blood in a scene of the movie.

Applying what they consider to be a principle of Rembrandt's, putting bright colors only in the shadows to attenuate them, Fairbanks' operators also apply themselves to attenuating them by relegating them to the background: "for example, there were painters who were always ready to intervene, in such a way that if a man dressed in light color was forced by the necessities of the action to get closer to the camera, it was immediately covered with a dust of a darker color". In application of the choice to favor green and brown, only very rare touches of red were allowed on the set, to mark blood or fire, and their presence on the screen was so brief that their effect was "more mental than visual."

Parker, aware of the difficulty of rendering the blue of the sky, believes that the film should be taken as an artistic "idealization" where the skies are "almost white, with just a very slight touch of a warm brown". On the other hand, he admitted that a scene where the sky must be blue is not the most successful. Thousands of liters of water also had to be tinted to make it appear on the screen in the desired color.

Color test of Billie Dove.

Color test of Mary Pickford.

Scene of the kiss.

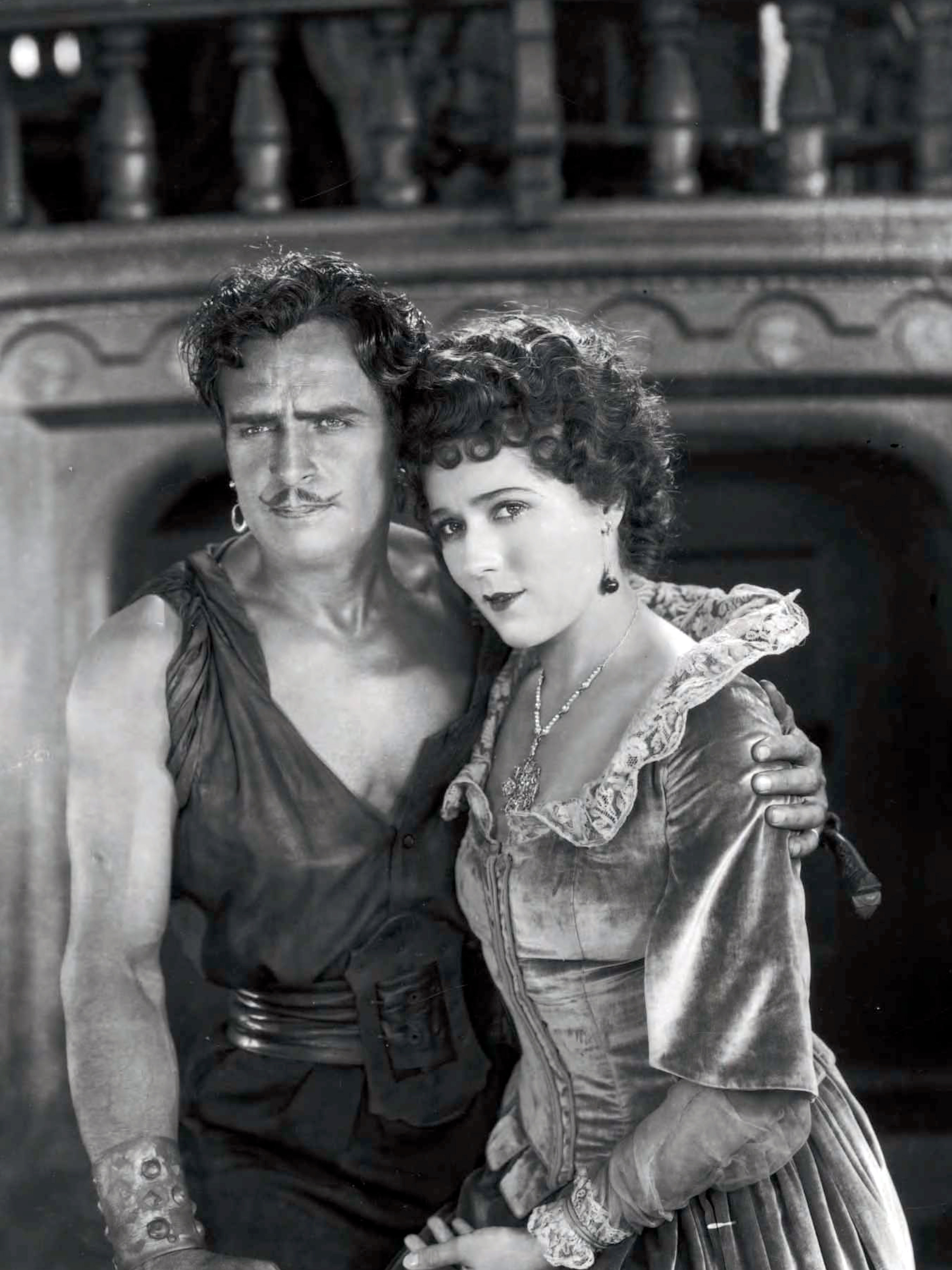
Fairbanks and Pickford.

After numerous color tests, the female lead was assigned to Billie Dove, who was noticed in Wanderer of the Wasteland (1924). However, Mary Pickford replaced her in the final kiss scene, perhaps out of jealousy. Although she is not credited for this appearance, she poses with Fairbanks, in the dress worn by Billie Dove, for a promotional photograph.

According to Thorp, "all the free time" in the six months leading up to filming was devoted to color testing for sets, make-up, and costumes. These tests quickly showed that the same paint does not produce the same color on the film, depending on whether it is applied to two different substrates; however, two shades could match on the film even though they clashed in reality. The walls of the studios were painted with samples of all shades to appreciate the rendering of each of them, and from there build a color chart to determine which color an object should be painted or dyed, to obtain the desired result on the screen. This process was complicated by the fact that the color rendering changed depending on whether the lighting was natural or artificial. In view of this compilation of color charts, the decision was made to paint or dye all the costumes, sets and accessories to control their chromatic rendering. On the subject of color essays, Albert Parker develops the notion of "color personality", explaining that cinematic actors in black and white are not necessarily also cinegenic in color, but that it seems complicated to characterize what gives a good color personality other than what he calls a "quality of the soul". In contrast, cinegenic in black and white is essentially reduced to the geometry of the face. "Disconcertingly", out of 300 color essays for the female lead, only a dozen revealed real color personalities, of great variety.

For their part, Technicolor's engineers adjusted the color print to meet Fairbanks' expectations. To do this, on the initiative of Arthur Ball and despite their personal preference for more saturated colors, they used "blackened dyes" to dye the color stripes, i.e. dyes to which black had been added to "modulate" their brilliance. Kalmus notes how well the result corresponds to the desired effect: the skin tones are softer, excess red is reduced, and the prints "have an absence of grain, a softness of texture, as well as a sharpness and clarity of the faces that are highly satisfactory".

=== Casting ===
Fairbanks surrounded himself with a group of talented performers. For the role of MacTavish, he chose Donald Crisp, who had directed him in Don Q, Son of Zorro (1925), and also played the film's main villain. Sam de Grasse, who had played the role of the lecherous Prince John in Robin Hood (1922), was awarded the role of the pirate lieutenant, while Anders Randolph was given the role of the ill-fated pirate captain. Randolph had prior fencing experience, which aided in his performance. Charles Stevens, who had supported Fairbanks in many films, including The Three Musketeers (1921) and Robin Hood, was cast as the pirate whose job it is to blow up ships after his crewmates had ransacked them.

For the role of the heroine, Fairbanks originally wanted an unknown actress. However, after seeing Billie Dove in Wanderer of the Wasteland, he offered her the role. In an interview made many years later, she recalled:

I was making a lumbering picture, The Ancient Highway, for Paramount. We were up in Washington state when I received a call from Doug Fairbanks. He said, "Billie, are you finished with that picture?"

I said, "I haven't the vaguest idea."

He said, "Well, when you know it's going to be finished, I want you to call me because I want you for my leading lady in The Black Pirate." Doug must have seen Wanderer of the Wasteland and liked the way I photographed in Technicolor.

=== Scenario ===
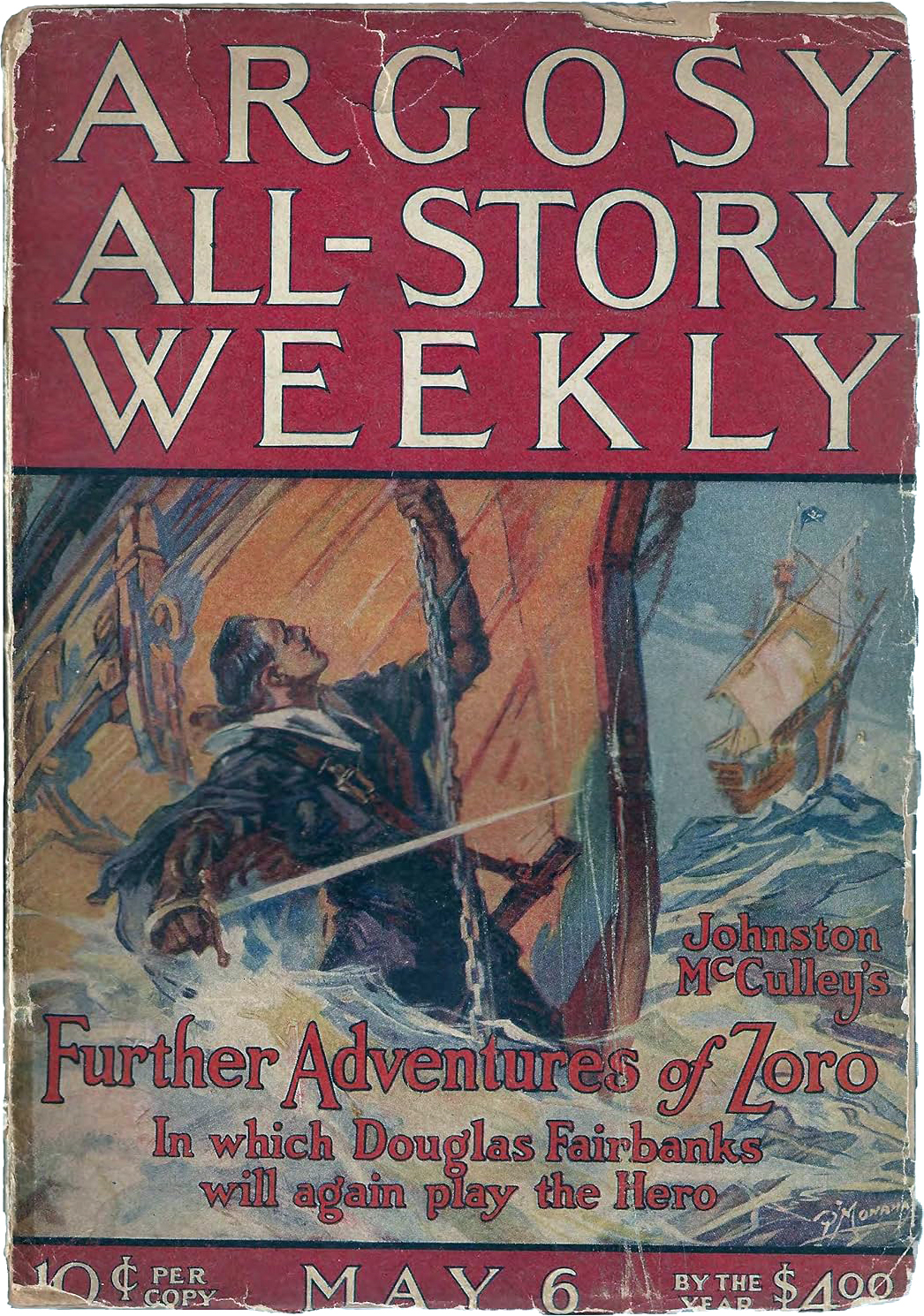
First issue of Johnston McCulley's serial novel The Further Adventures of Zorro in May 1922, with the cover announcement that Fairbanks would soon play the role of the hero

In early 1922, after the success of The Mark of Zorro (1920), Fairbanks invited Johnston McCulley, the author of the novel on which the film is based, to propose a new subject. McCulley presented various ideas, including a sequel to Zorro with pirates and a story of chivalry (which would become Robin Hood after modification). The specialized press was quick to announce that Fairbanks' next film would be a Zorro adventure with pirates, but the news was denied after a month. However, it was planned that the story, entitled The Further Adventures of Zorro, would be published as a serial release, so that the upcoming film, starring the same actors as The Mark of Zorro, can build on the expected success with the readership. Fairbanks bought the rights to the story in 1922 and reused several elements of it in the screenplay of The Black Pirate, including the character played by Donald Crisp, the capture of the heroine by the pirates, Fairbanks' acrobatics in the sails of the ship and the final intervention of his acolytes. The Black Pirate also takes up the stereotypes of the hero's secret identity and the superiority of a normative political order over its violent negation by pirates.

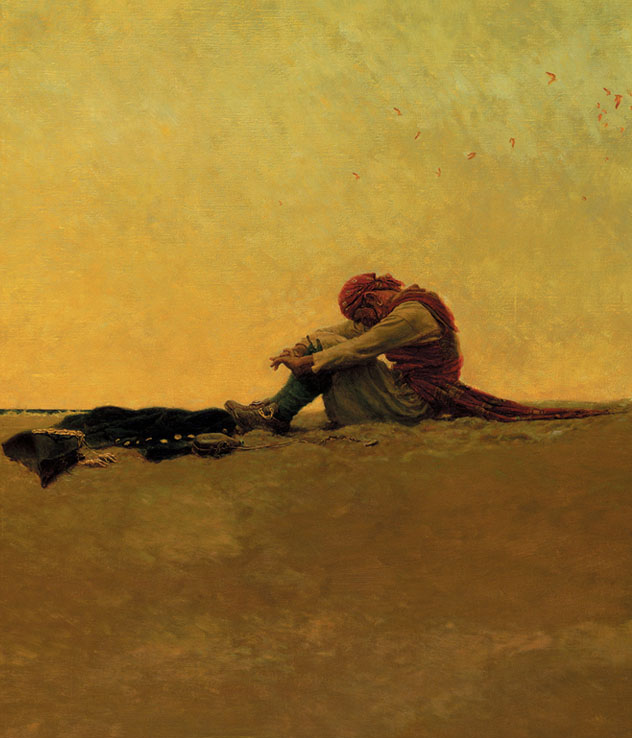
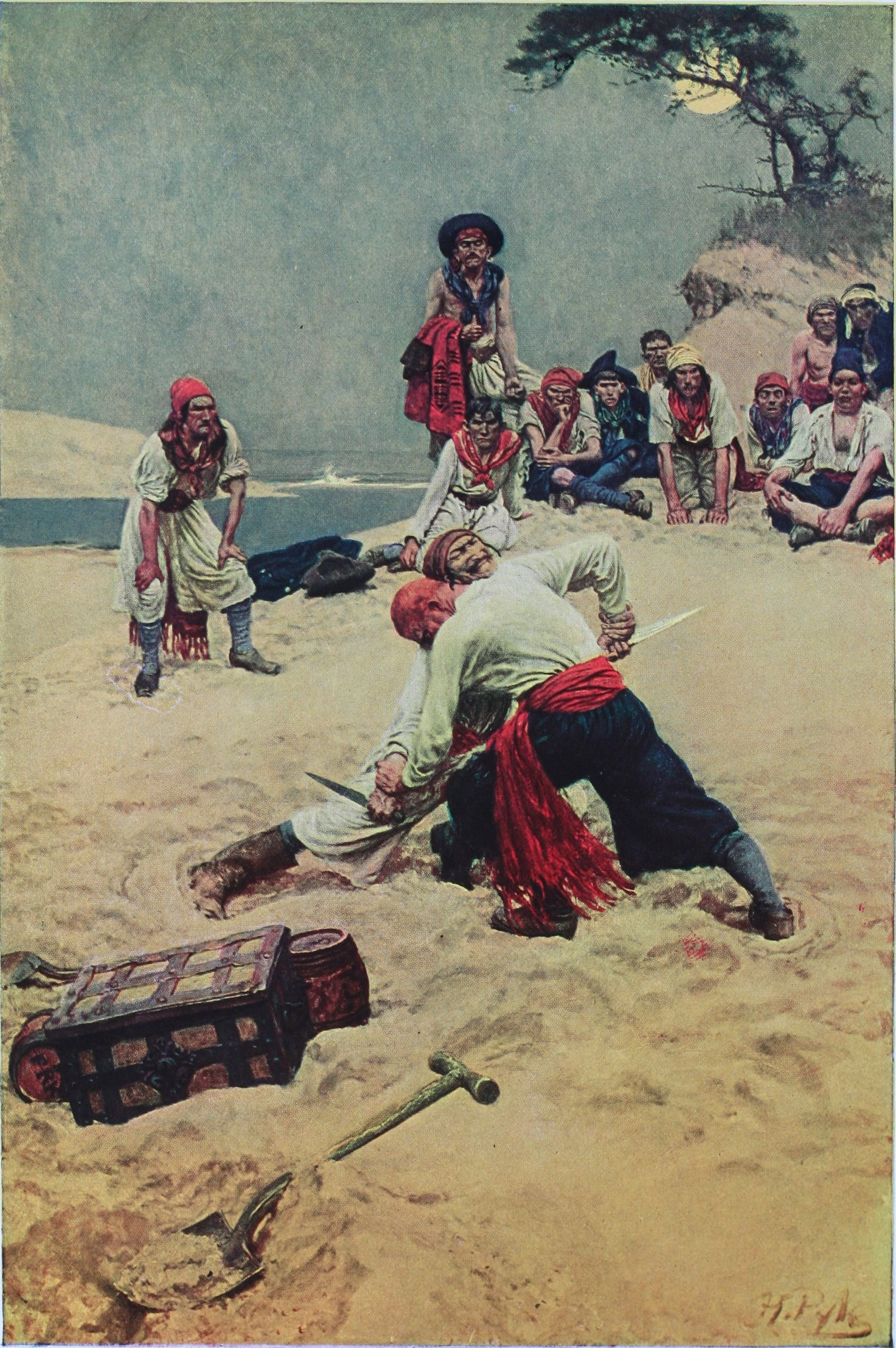
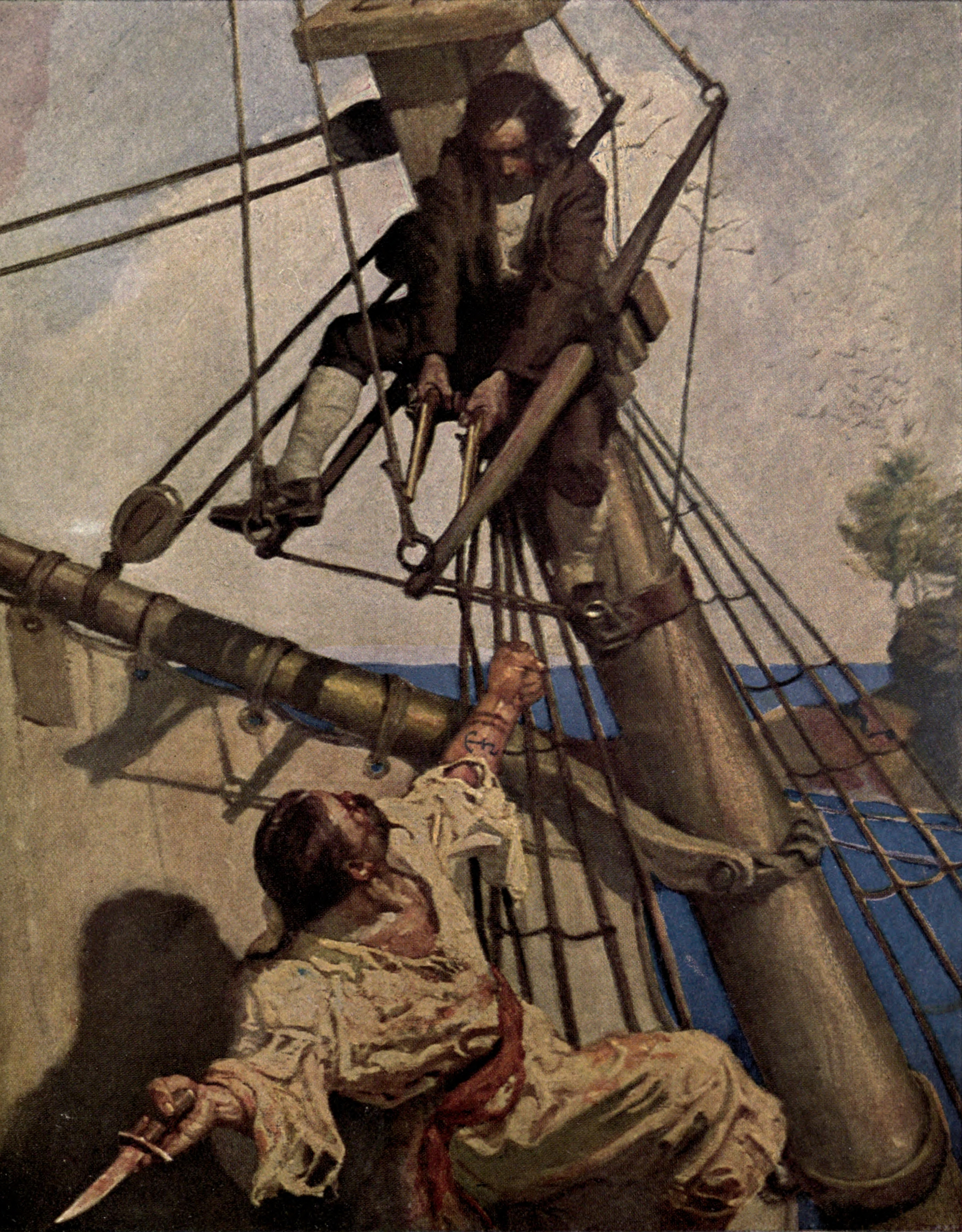
Illustrations from Howard Pyle Book of Pirates and N. C. Wyeth's for Treasure Island. The film's script is deliberately simplified and organized around these images. Despite several offers from Fairbanks and Pickford, Wyeth refused to collaborate on the film.

The film's synopsis is based, in addition to McCulley's story, on a screenplay called The Black Pirate written in 1923 for Fairbanks by Eugene Wiley Presbrey, as well as elements of Robert Louis Stevenson's Treasure Island and J. M. Barrie's Peter Pan. (Note: The Black Pirate, a story for young boys published in 1893 by Harry Blyth, is sometimes considered the source of the film, but the challenge to paternal authority underpinning the story makes this conjecture unlikely.) Despite these borrowings, the authorship of the film's synopsis is claimed by Fairbanks, as with most of his films, under the pen name (formed from his middle and third names) of Elton Thomas. The final version, however, was developed in collaboration with screenwriter Jack Cunningham and Lotta Woods, Fairbanks' secretary and screenwriter.

However, this is not strictly speaking a detailed scenario: according to a claim published in the New York Times and attributed to Ted Reed, Fairbanks' production manager, or Fairbanks itself, "there is no script", but only a set plot and a shooting schedule where the action was summarized in less than 2,000 words and which dealt only with the essence of the action, leaving Fairbanks more room for improvisation during filming. For his part, Albert Parker believes that the concern to balance the use of color to give the viewer the feeling of the pirate world and the development of a plot led to the latter being limited to a "succession of situations", the narrative framework being reduced to a simple thread. According to Bernard Eisenschitz, the simplification of the story and the slowing down of its pace are intended to focus the viewer's attention on the colors. Paul Rotha, for his part, considers this film to be one of Fairbanks' best and sees in it "a collection of impossible situations in wonderful settings".

The simplification of the script results in a reduced number of scenes, 750 compared to an average of 1,000 to 3,000 for a feature film, and intertitles (only 78). According to Ralph Hancock, it is one of the main qualities of the film. Jeffrey Richards, for the same reason, considers him one of the best in Fairbanks:

Neither based on a classic novel, nor burdened with court intrigues, it is entirely a cinematographic creation: a film light as air, graceful as a pavane, joyful as a summer day [...] Just like the conception of his production, the content of the story is rigorously stylized. It's a distillation of all pirate myths.

=== Set design ===
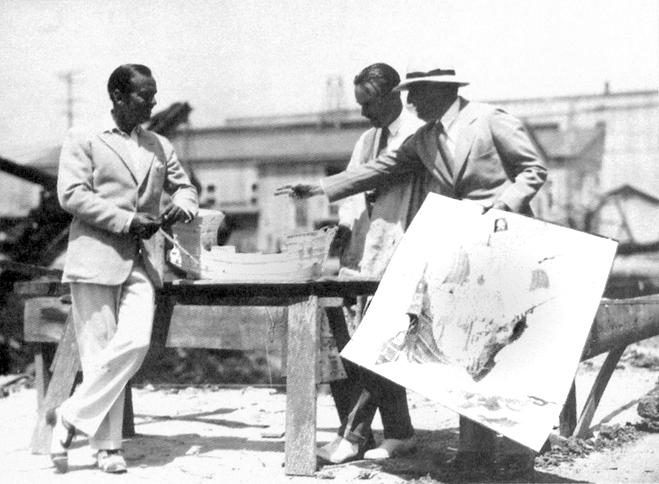
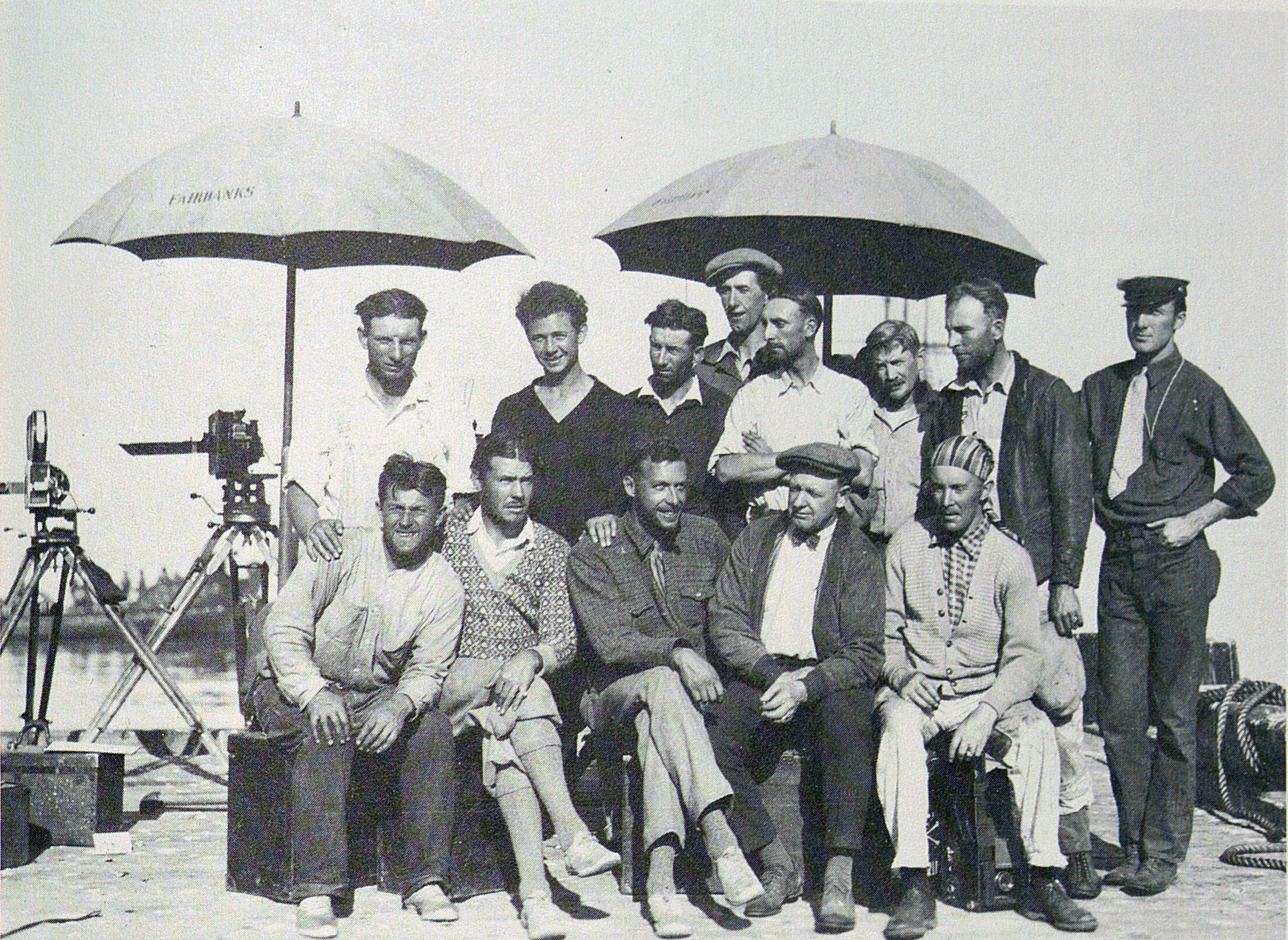
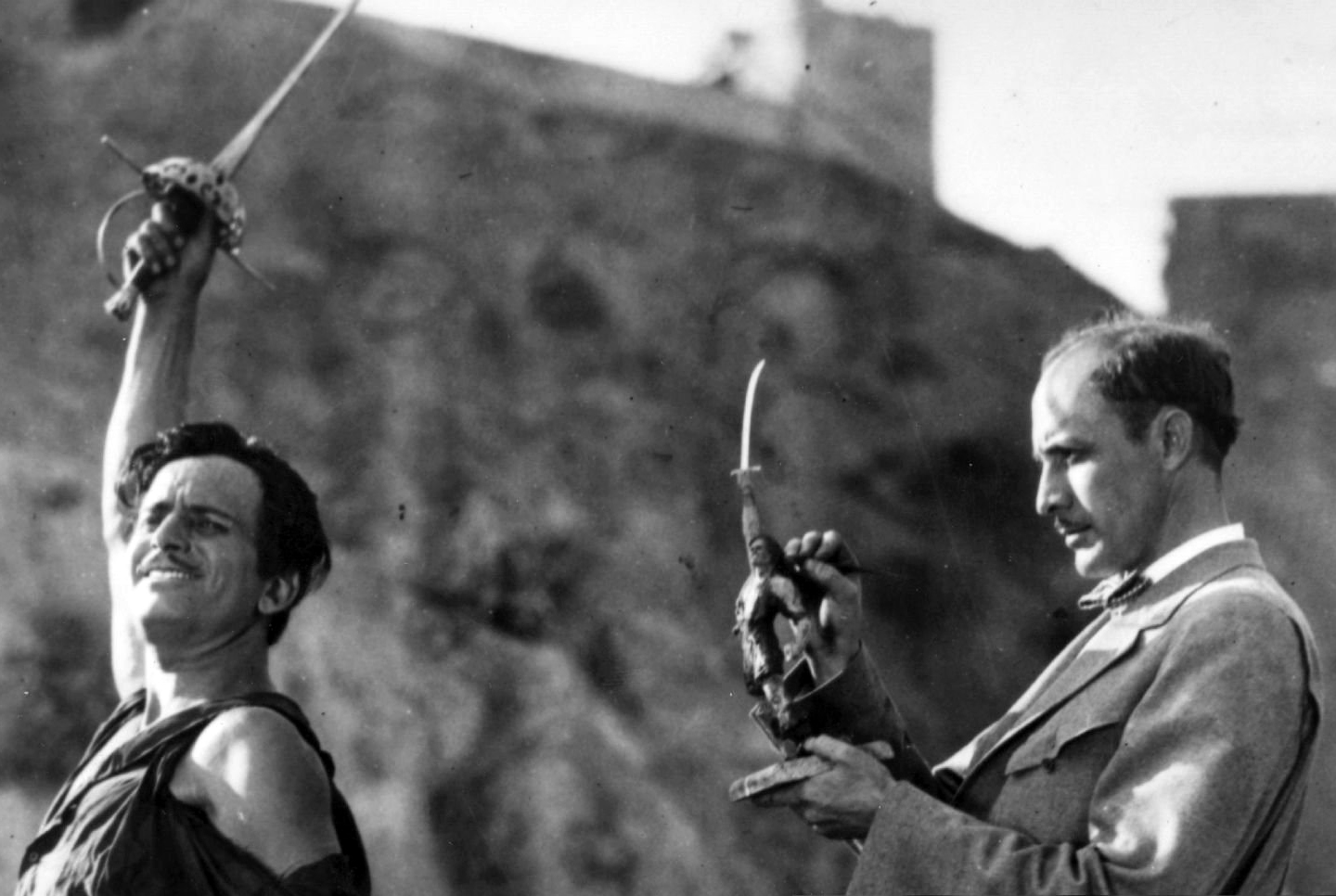
On the left, Fairbanks, Borg, and Parker are discussing a model and sketch of the pirate ship. In the center, Borg (seated on the right) and his team. On the right, Dwight Franklin, the pirate specialist, is carving a miniature of Fairbanks. Photo, Fairbanks; Borg and Parker.

The artistic direction of the film was entrusted to Carl Oscar Borg, a self-taught painter and former sailor, known for his illustrations of the Southwest United States, whom Fairbanks had previously consulted for westerns and to whom he gave great creative freedom. Borg made "hundreds of sketches of the sets and characters" before filming. His contribution was described in January 1926 as "the greatest cinematographic innovation since the invention of the close-up by D. W. Griffith", suggesting that "the screenwriter of the future will be an artist and no longer just an author". According to a journalist, as a "brilliant painter", he created "a whole historical novel on the web even before the first turn of the crank". He was assisted by Dwight Franklin, who was considered a specialist on pirates. While Borg designed the sets, Franklin took care of the costumes and the positioning of the actors and extras, preparing sketches each evening for the next day's filming. For his part, the English poet Robert Nichols was in charge of "orchestrating the movement", especially those of pirate groups by adjusting even their hand movements. (Note: Rudy Behlmer was surprised that Nichols only intervened on the body language, while Jeffrey Vance claims that he is the author of much of the intertitles.)

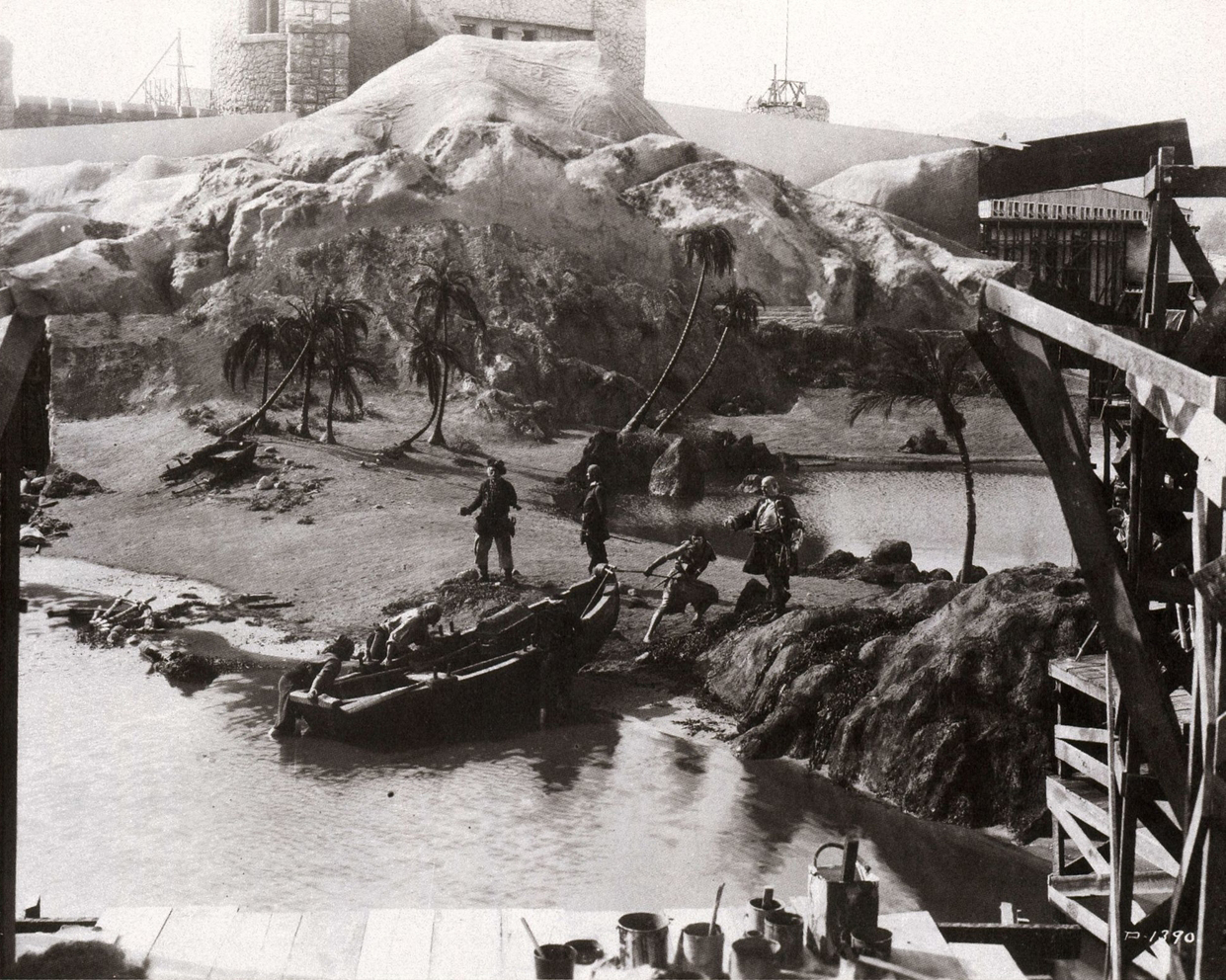
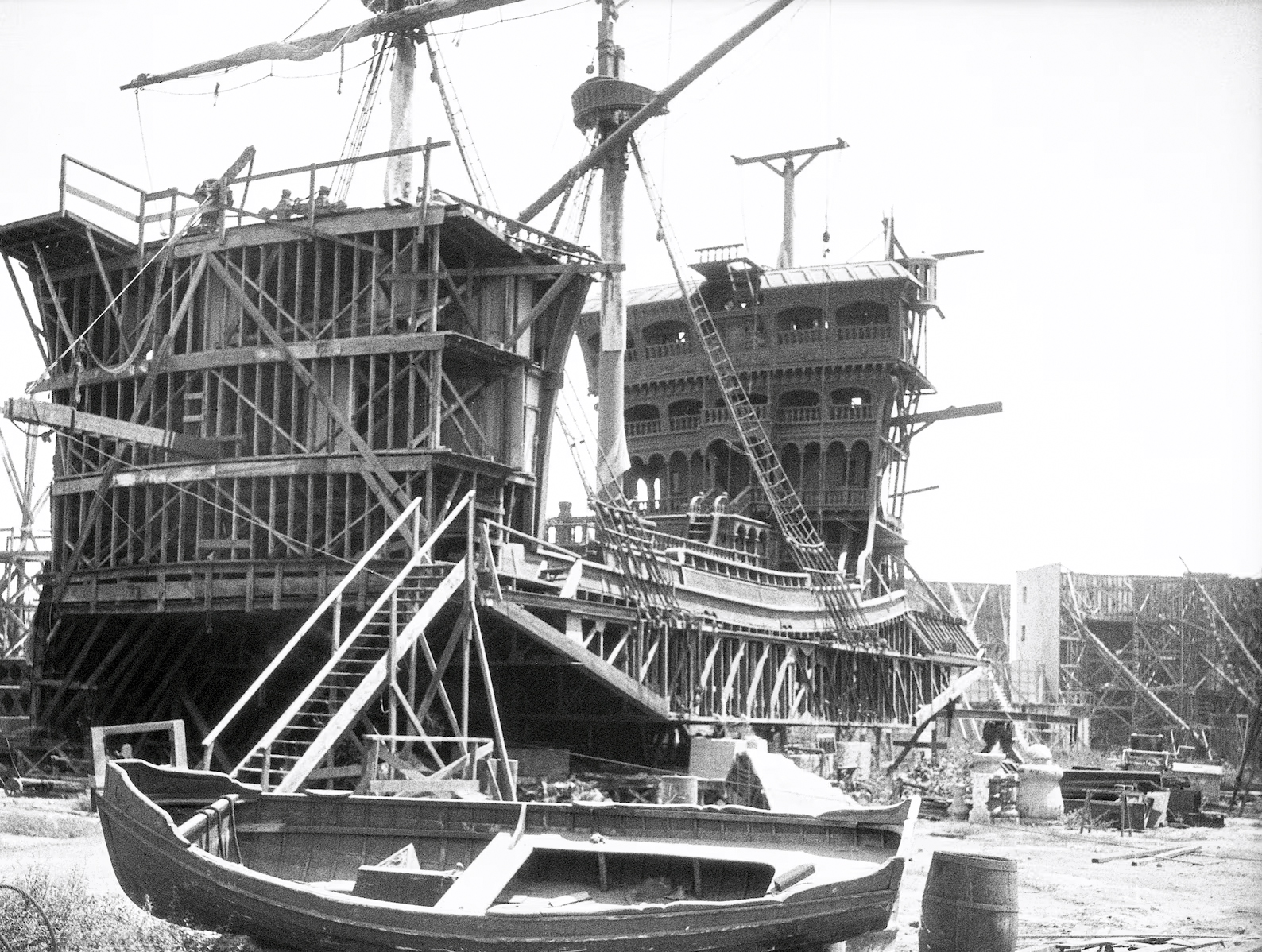
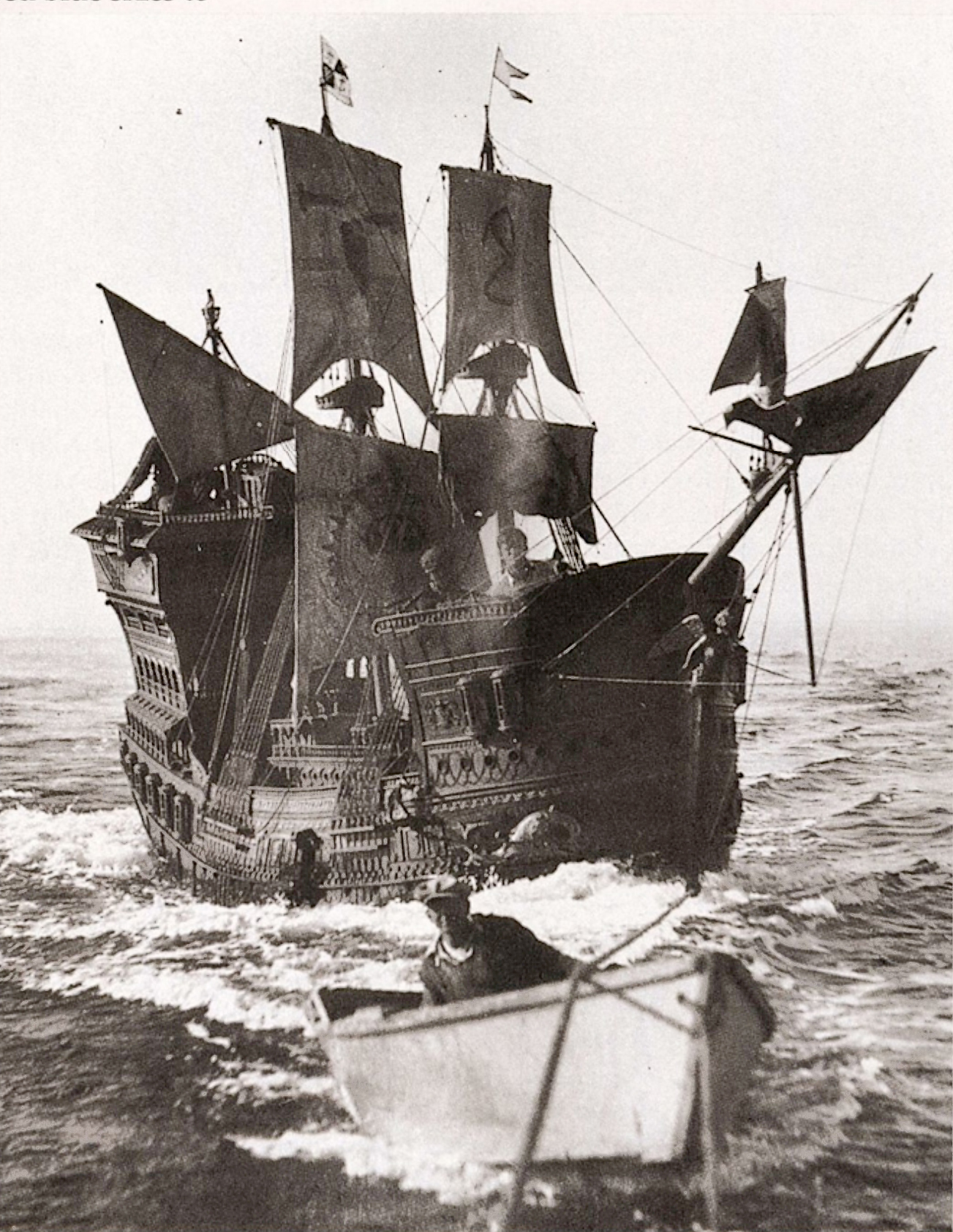
A Caribbean island beach recreated in a studio (in the background, the set of another film), a galleon under construction with mahogany exteriors and oak decks, and a miniaturized version for filming in the studio's pool.

It was first planned to shoot on Santa Catalina Island, near Los Angeles, where other pirate film shoots have already taken place. However, it appears from the first color tests that it is too difficult to control the effect of external light is too difficult, with the chromatic rendering being "all wrong — the yellows too yellow and the greens too violent".

To control the color effects, all sets designed by Borg and his team, as well as 95% of the exteriors, were created at the Pickford-Fairbanks studio in Hollywood. A 60 by 60 meter pool, containing more than two and a half million liters of water, was built, on the edges of which were placed aircraft propellers to obtain waves one meter high. The water was colored with a green tint to avoid the uncertain rendering of blue tones. The blue of the sky that could not be rendered, so it was made into an "idealized" white with touches of brown, an effect produced by hanging canvases from the ceiling in gradient browns.

Fairbanks originally considered adapting old boats to the needs of filming. Instead, using Borg's plans, he decided to have a team of 380 people build four ships, including three galleons, ranging in length from 30 to 65 meters and a 100-oared galley. This task was coordinated by a specialist named "Doc" Wilson. To ensure the verisimilitude of details, such as hemp swellings, he employed European craftsmen, especially Norwegian. Small-sized galleons, maneuverable by a single stuntman, were specially built, as well as various boat sections. To simulate pitching for scenes with actors, these were mounted on motorized metal hoops.

=== Stunts ===
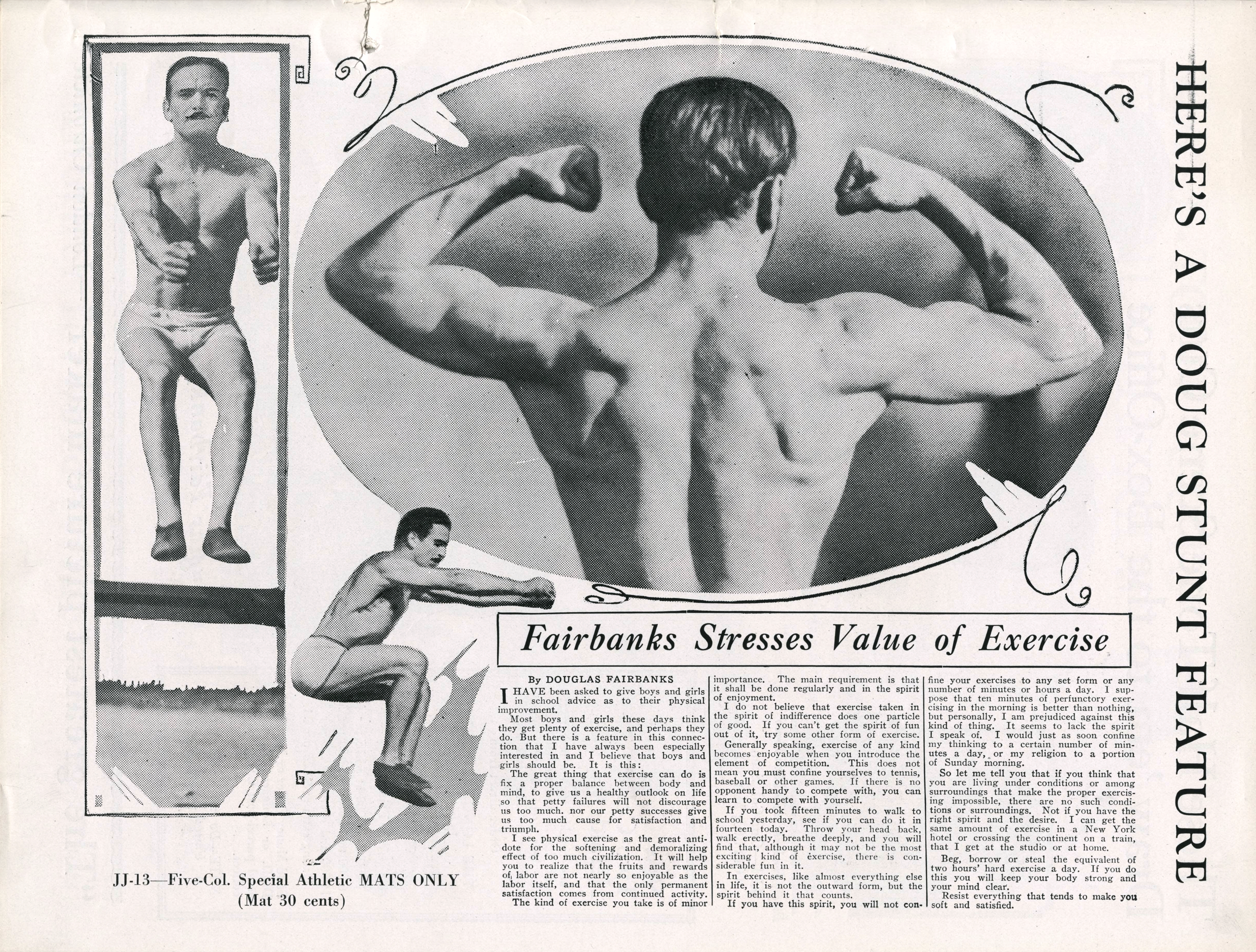
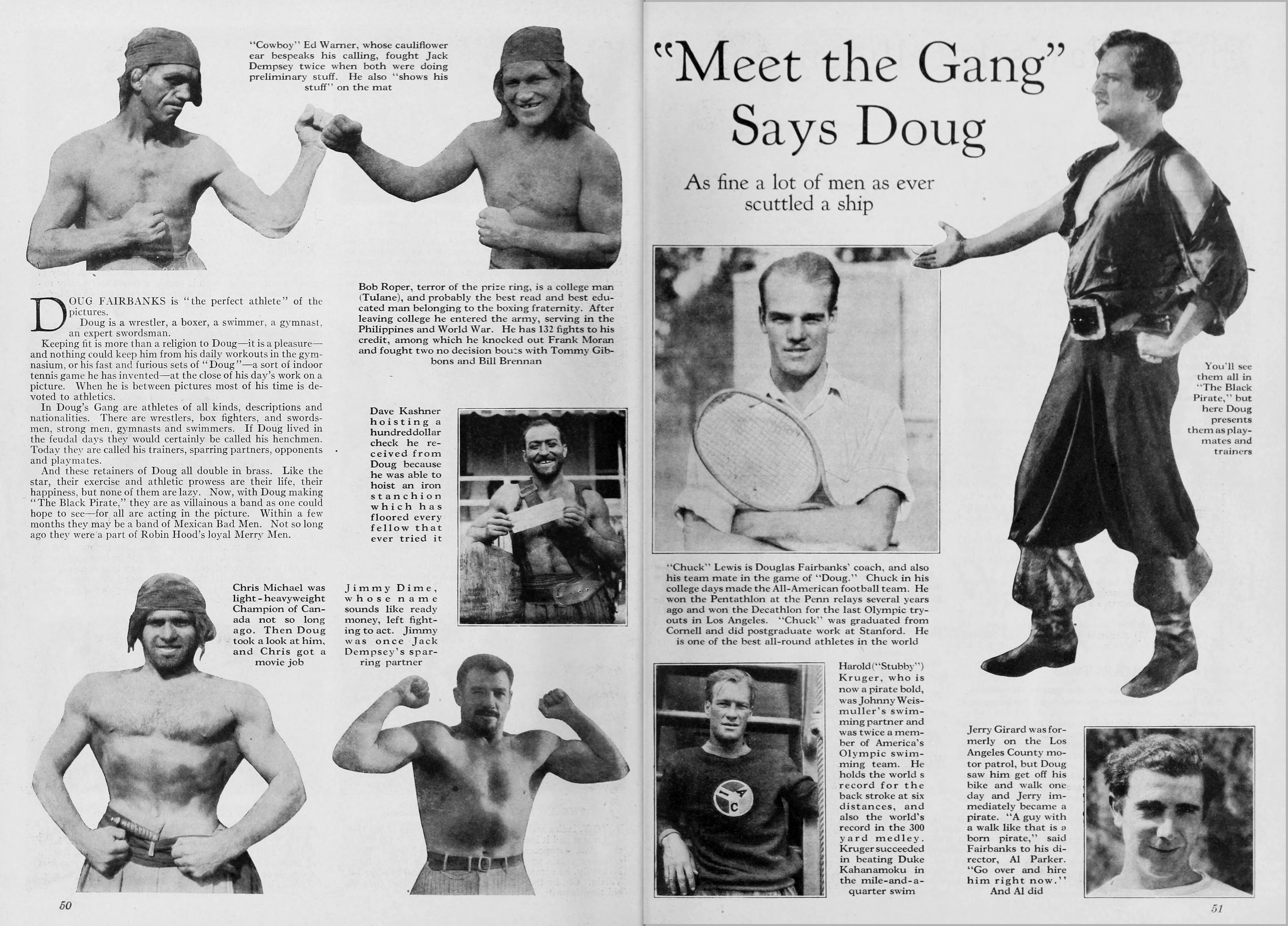
On the left, the film's press kit page. In the center, an article published during filming about the band of merry athletes surrounding Fairbanks and playing pirate roles. On the right, Fairbanks is raised by his men to the rank of "patron saint of the swashbuckling film".

The two main traits of the pirate played by Fairbanks are, as in most of his films, his smile and the ease with which he performs his stunts. By the 1910s, Fairbanks was seen as an ideal model not only of "vigorous American masculinity", but also a form of youthful enthusiasm often compared to Peter Pan's refusal to grow old. This double characterization as a man in whom the instincts and needs of the child are always present and who cultivates them through physical regeneration and an optimistic morality. This helped to make him an American cultural icon in the 1920s, at a time when boys' education and male models of behavior were being challenged by the arrival of women in the workforce and urban sedentarisation. To conform to this ideal image of his public persona, Fairbanks' communication constantly emphasized his "extraordinary muscular development" and the fact that he performed all his stunts himself, from which he derived great amusement.

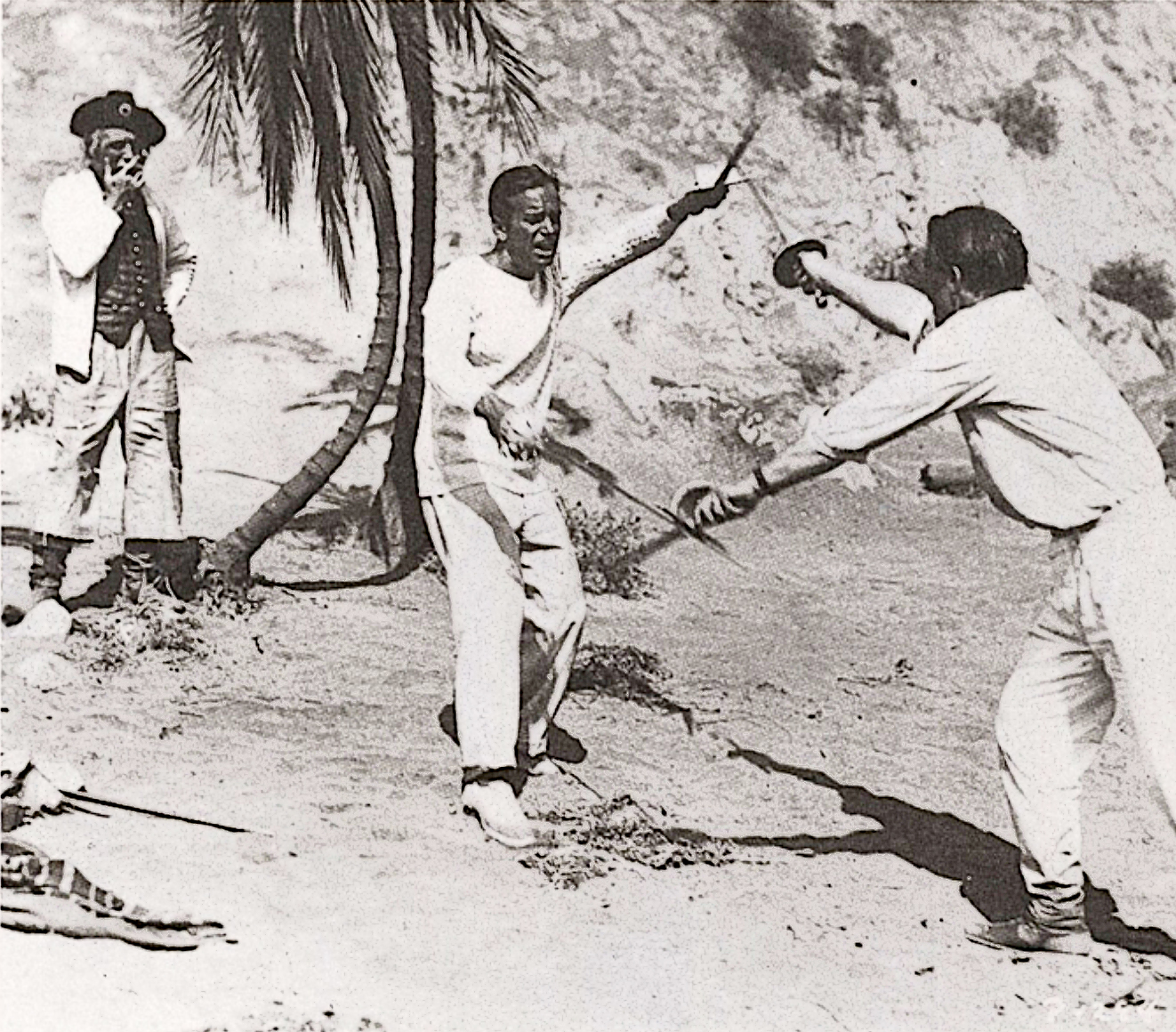
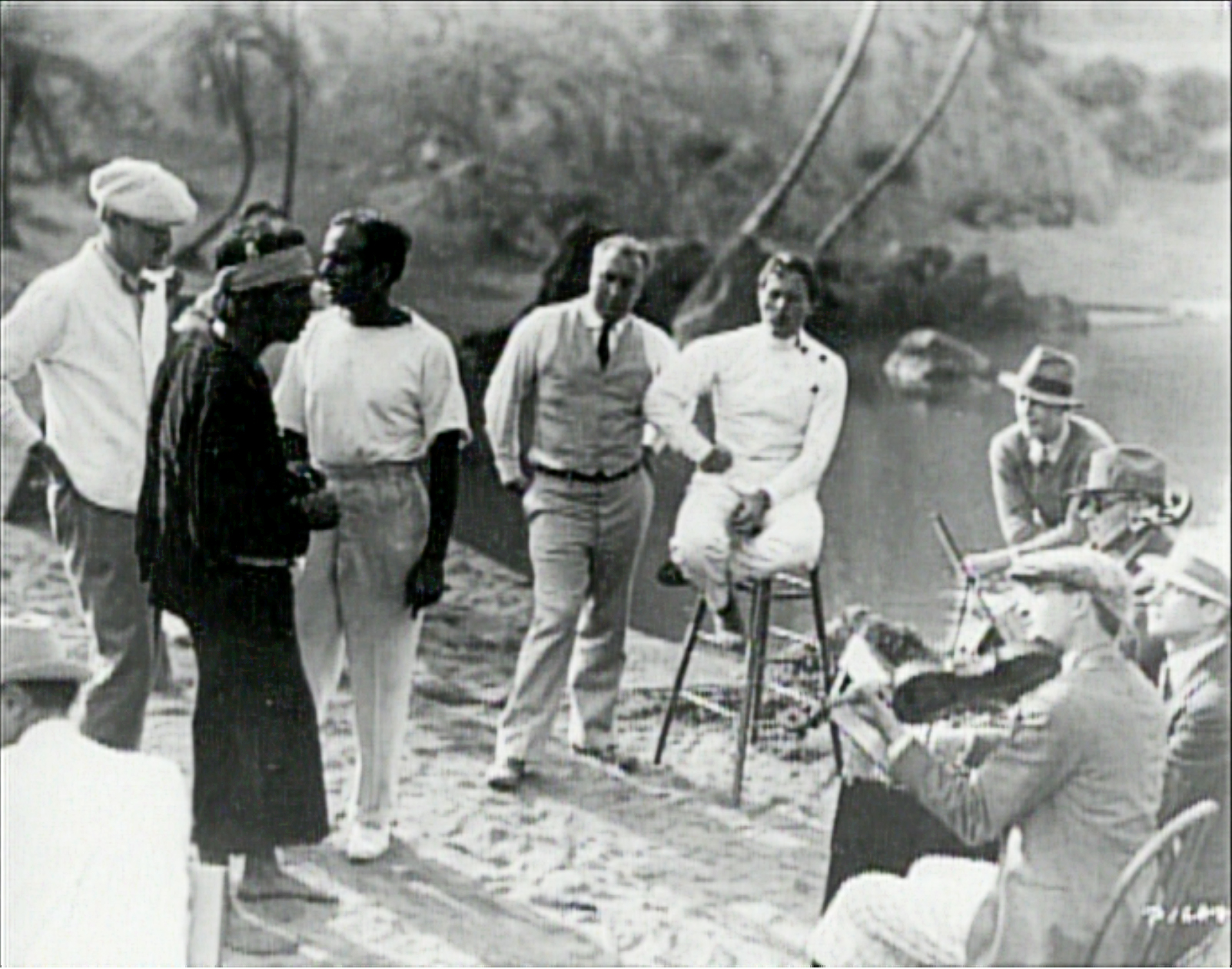
Fairbanks rehearses with Fred Cavens, the fencer in charge of organizing the duels, who guides the actors behind the camera during filming; Cavens attends the rehearsals with musicians to provide rhythm; unused takes from the duel. (Note: Cavens injured Fairbanks in the face during one of the rehearsals.) According to Cavens, all the movements of the duels, both the attacks and the parries, had to be technically correct but amplified.

In the 1920s, Fairbanks abandoned the character of a young man refusing to become an adult, but chose themes from children's literature and adventure novels. While being part of a situation of revenge and filiation and transposing into a prestigious epic context issues related to the affirmation of a heroic virile personality, his stunts express the nostalgia of a childlike innocence before the world of work, aiming to please both adults and children by "making the impossible become true". The Black Pirate was considered by critics to be an adventure "seen through the eyes of a boy", which "will delight the big children that we are", because one would have to "have nothing that survives from childhood" not to derive pleasure from it.

Unpreserved shots of stunts in the rigging, shot upside down, where the actor use a rope to guide himself, and of the sailing scene, where Fairbanks is recognizable.

Fairbanks' expertise in stunts lay in the choreographic care taken in the preparation and innovation of the stunts. The Black Pirate features one of its most famous stunts, where he immobilizes a boat by sliding down a sail, helped only by his knife. According to William K. Everson, Fairbanks was doubled in this scene by stuntman Richard Talmadge. According to other sources, the stunt was performed by Charles Stevens or Chuck Lewis, friends of Fairbanks who played minor roles in the film. According to Booton Herndon, Rudy Behlmer, and Tracey Goessel, however, the examination of the stunt makes it possible to recognize Fairbanks. According to Robert Parrish, Fairbanks told him that Talmadge had developed the stunt and that he had shot it himself. The scene was shot in a separate set from the boat, with a tilted sail, inflated by an airplane propeller, and cameras also angled to give the illusion of verticality. The sail was pre-cut, and the knife, positioned on the side of the sail, invisible on the screen, was held on a rope and balanced by a counterweight. Fairbanks was protected by a harness and duct tape, according to a device designed by his brother Robert, the film's producer. Léon Moussinac in L'Humanité considers this scene to be "the only shot to remember" from a film that is "stupid [...] atrociously aggravated by a coloring of the images that is not frank enough to impose itself and which is strong enough to make us regret the game of white and black". (Note: Léon Moussinac believes that The Black Pirate is a "particularly lamentable" attempt at color cinema and that the use of the Technicolor process only serves to "degrade" the images and to "make vast profits by speculating on the public's bad taste and curiosity." This criticism of the Technicolor process is shared by members of the League of Black and White, created in Paris at the time of the French release of Fairbanks' film to defend the "cinema-art block" against the "boutique cinema block." According to Carlo Rim, who shares the same sensitivity, Albert Parker in this film has "brought back to the trichromy [sic] of the Roybet the multiple brilliance of his privateer drama, thereby destroying the depth of its blacks, the pallor of its whites" without colour ever advantageously replacing "the sublime and mysterious play of this two-tone of shadow and light which is … the very originality of cinema")

Underwater swimming scene as it was filmed and as it appears on screen.

On the other hand, the critic John Grierson, in a column entitled "The Pink Pirate", published in 1926, considered that the light atmosphere and the extreme care given to the visual effects, which worked well in The Thief of Bagdad, were detrimental to The Black Pirate, which was not as dark and brutal as a film devoted to pirates should be, and instead fell into a fairytale beauty that was applied and "eviscerated" the film. According to him, Fairbanks twirls in the rigging "a little too pretty" and his combat swimmers are reminiscent of "a group of fairies swimming under the moon". Jeffrey Richards refers to another remarkable scene in the film, "unforgettable and resembling a dream", about fifty soldiers swim underwater in formation. The scene was actually shot upside down and dry, in a painted set, with each of the extras suspended by a piano wire and holding in their mouths a pipe from which small balls and feathers fell. This, once the film is turned over, gives the illusion of air bubbles. According to Henri Diamant-Berger, this sequence "deserves to remain among the classics of cinema".

== Release ==
=== Distribution ===
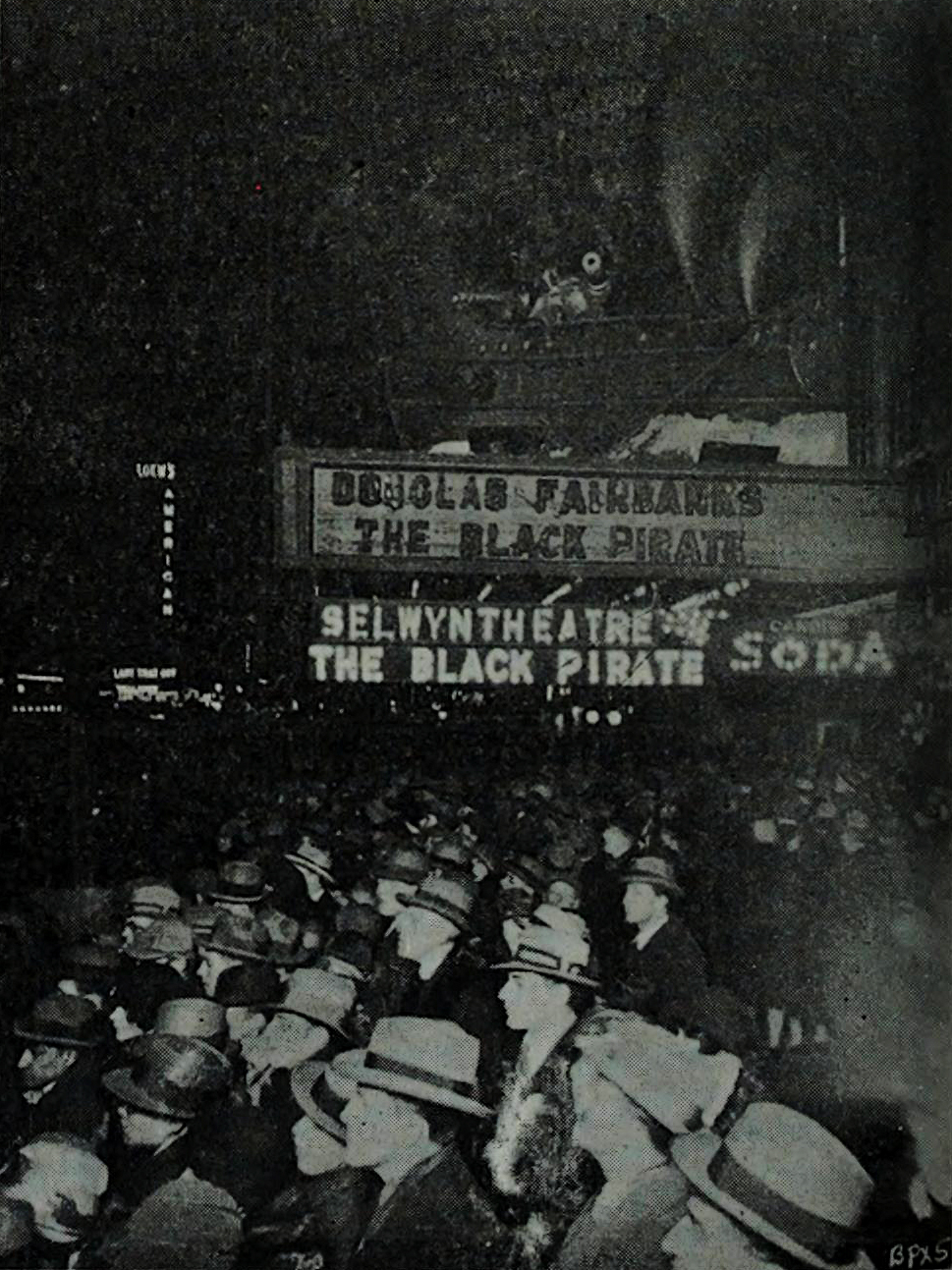
Crowd in front of the Selwyn Theatre in New York on the night of the premiere.

The film premiered on May 8, 1926, simultaneously at the Tivoli cinema in London, in the presence of Robert Fairbanks, crowned heads and "eminent Parisian critics", and in New York at the Selwyn Theatre, in the presence of Doug, Mary and, outside, a crowd that the police had difficulty containing. This New York premiere was preceded by a promotional campaign consisting of a treasure hunt, organized with the daily newspaper The Evening World, and a radio broadcast of the film's accompanying music, complemented by an interview with Fairbanks. The staging of the first broadcast at the Selwyn, introduced by a performance of the song "Dead Man's Chest", followed by the invitation by a sepulchral voice to transport oneself in thought to the time of the pirates, is noted in the New York Times and the Moving Picture World.

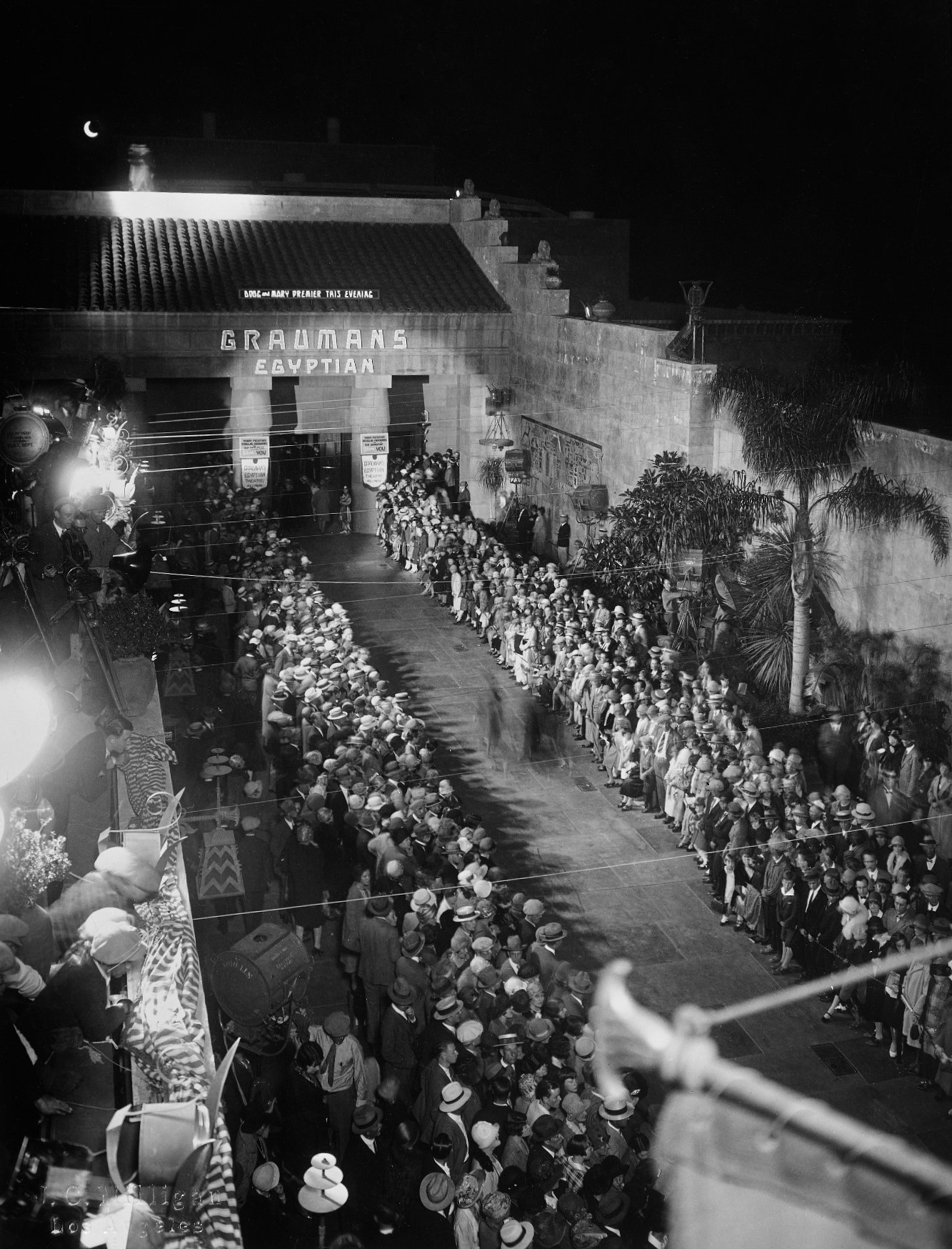
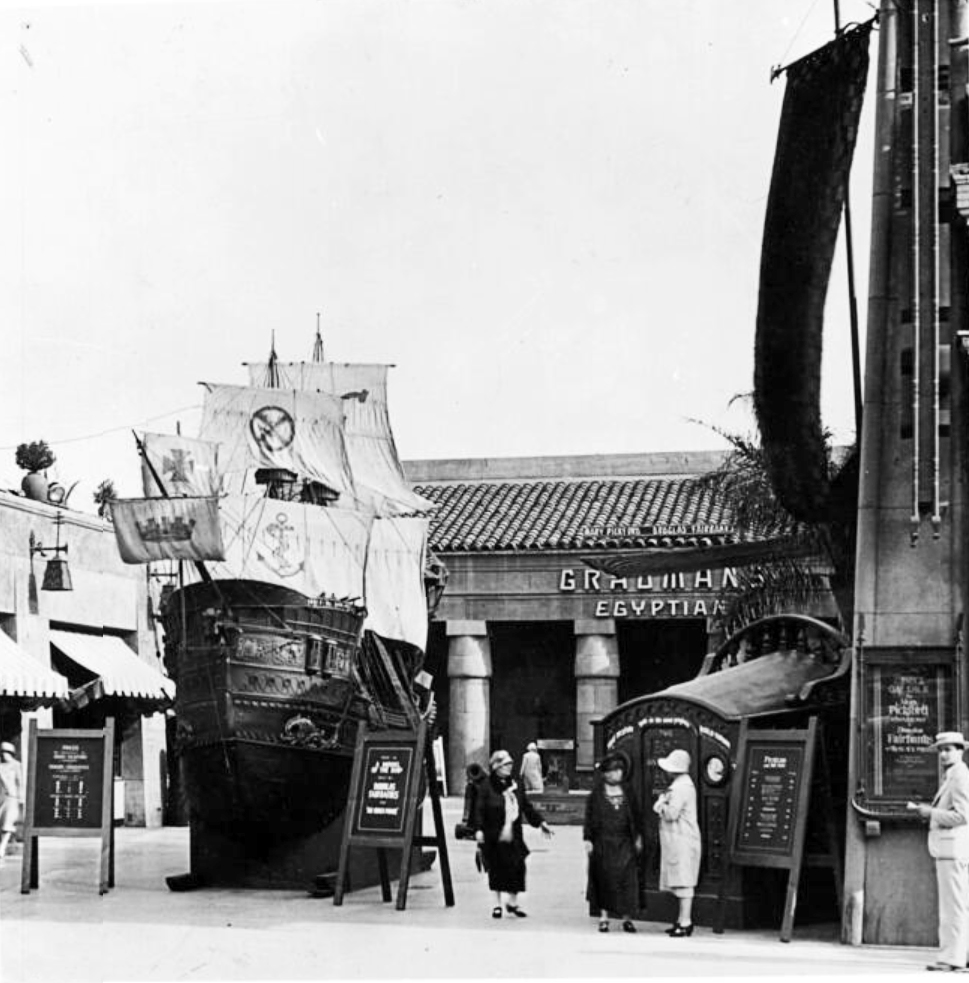
Inaugural night in Hollywood and a replica of the galleon from the film in front of Grauman's room.

After nine weeks, the Selwyn's exclusivity ended. Sid Grauman seized the chance to stage a West Coast premiere at Hollywood's Egyptian Theatre on May 14, 1926, pairing The Black Pirate with Mary Pickford's Sparrows. Ingeniously compensating for the absence of Doug and Mary, on vacation in Europe, (Note: A few days before the Hollywood party, Doug and Mary were granted a fifteen-minute audience with Benito Mussolini, whom Fairbanks said he admired for his energy and charisma, and then they were photographed at the Roman Forum making the fascist salute.) Grauman organized a successful event that attracted a large crowd, whose high price (Note: Tickets were priced at $5, compared to $5 for each of the two films that premiered exclusively in New York.) was justified before the screening of the two films with by the addition of dancing and inging of "preludes", and in sets reminiscent of those of the film. In addition, the beginning was accompanied by sound effects from under the spectators' seats. (Note: Notwithstanding the attractions and the good reviews, this double program, was scheduled to stay on stage for eight months, but occupied it for only fourteen weeks.)

National distribution began at the end of May 1926, supported by favorable reviews and the novelty effect of Technicolor. The Black Pirate was voted one of the ten best films of 1926 and one of the most popular films of 1927. By the end of 1927, the revenue from its American operations amounted to $1,730,000. A total of 416 copies were ordered from Technicolor, which took a year to deliver. However, because of the high costs, which amounted to $847,000, including $170,000 for the Technicolor print run that was three times more expensive than a black and white one, the film was one of the least profitable of those produced by Fairbanks, surpassed only in this respect by the expensive The Thief of Baghdad.

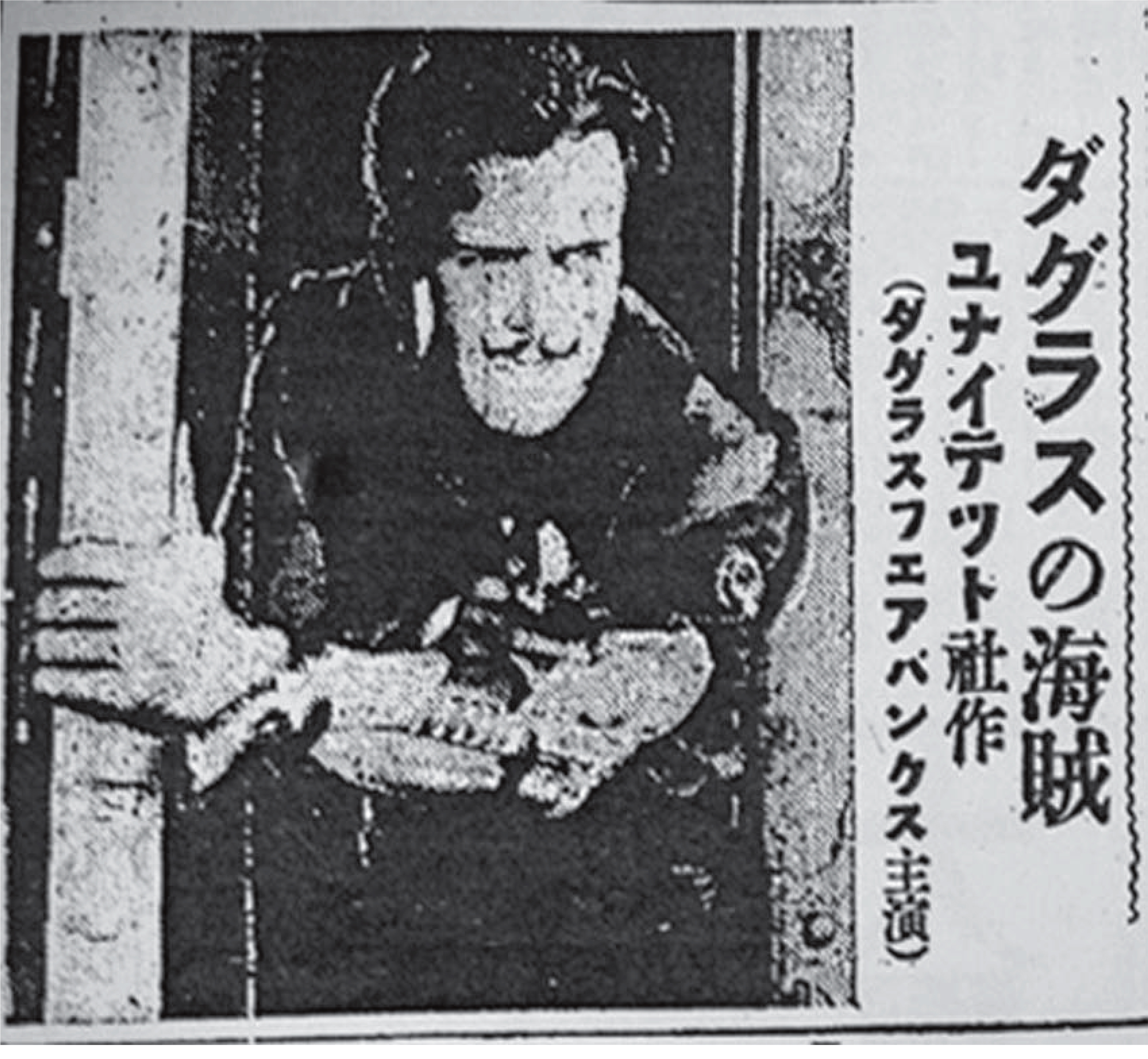
Japanese advertising

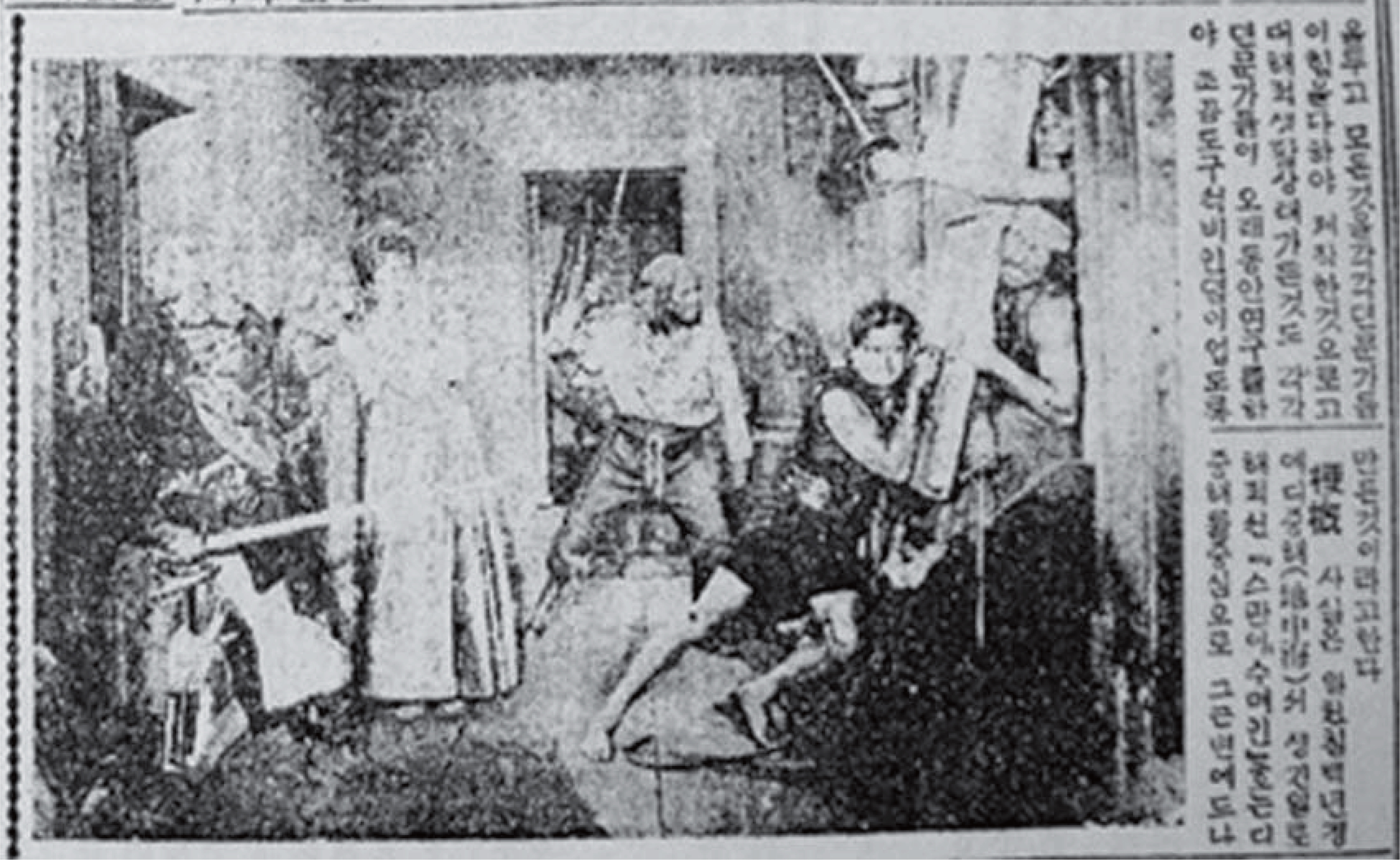
Korean article

Internationally, the film's distribution capitalized on the "global star" status of Fairbanks and the success of his previous swashbuckling films. In 1926, he was one of the most popular stars in Korea, which led to record-breaking distribution rights for his films. The exclusive first rights to The Black Pirate in Seoul sparked a resounding competition between exhibitors, leading to police intervention before the rights were awarded to the Dansungsa theatre for the Korean-speaking audience and the Ogonkan theatre for the Japanese-language audience. The film was also a great success in India.

=== Technical problems ===
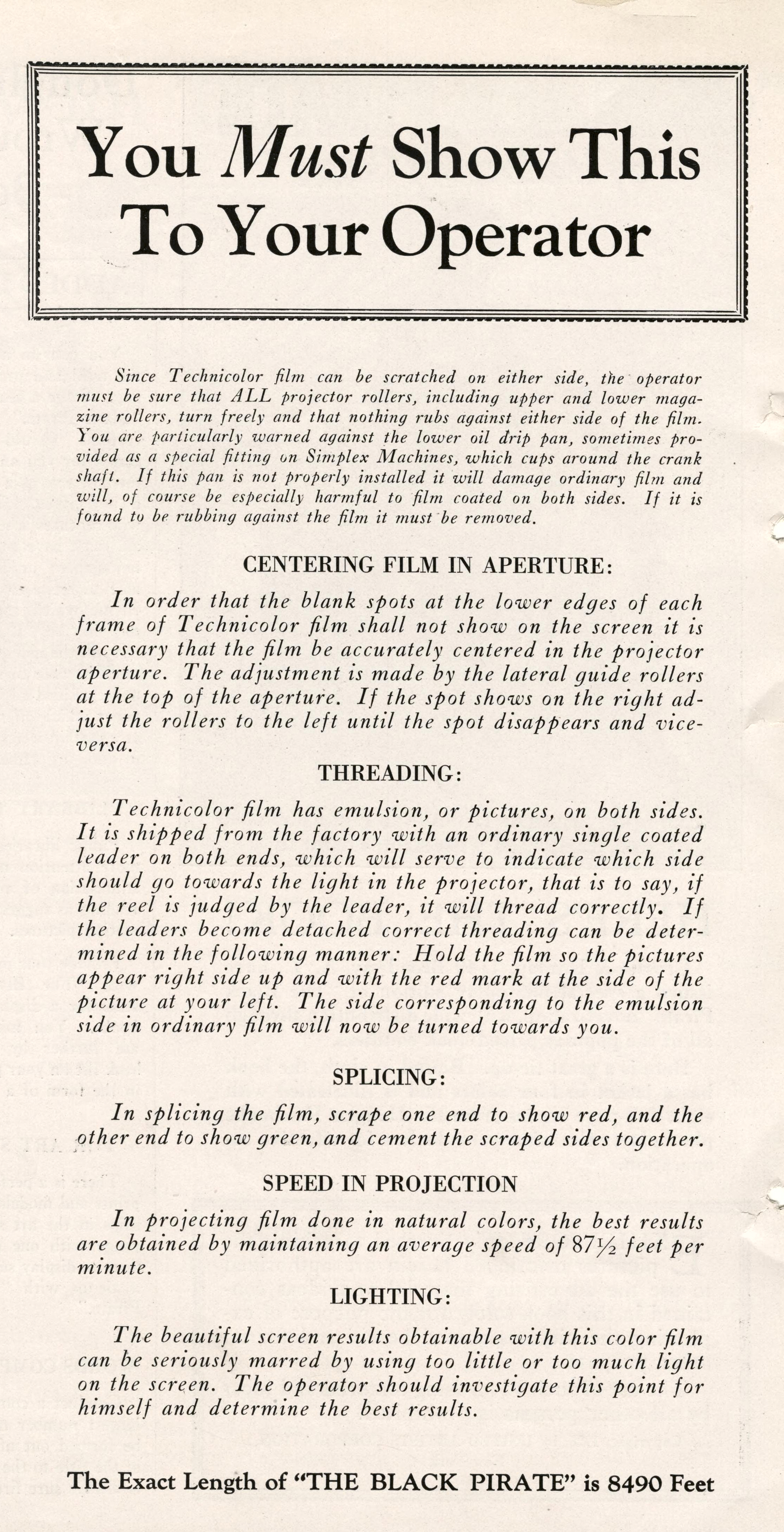
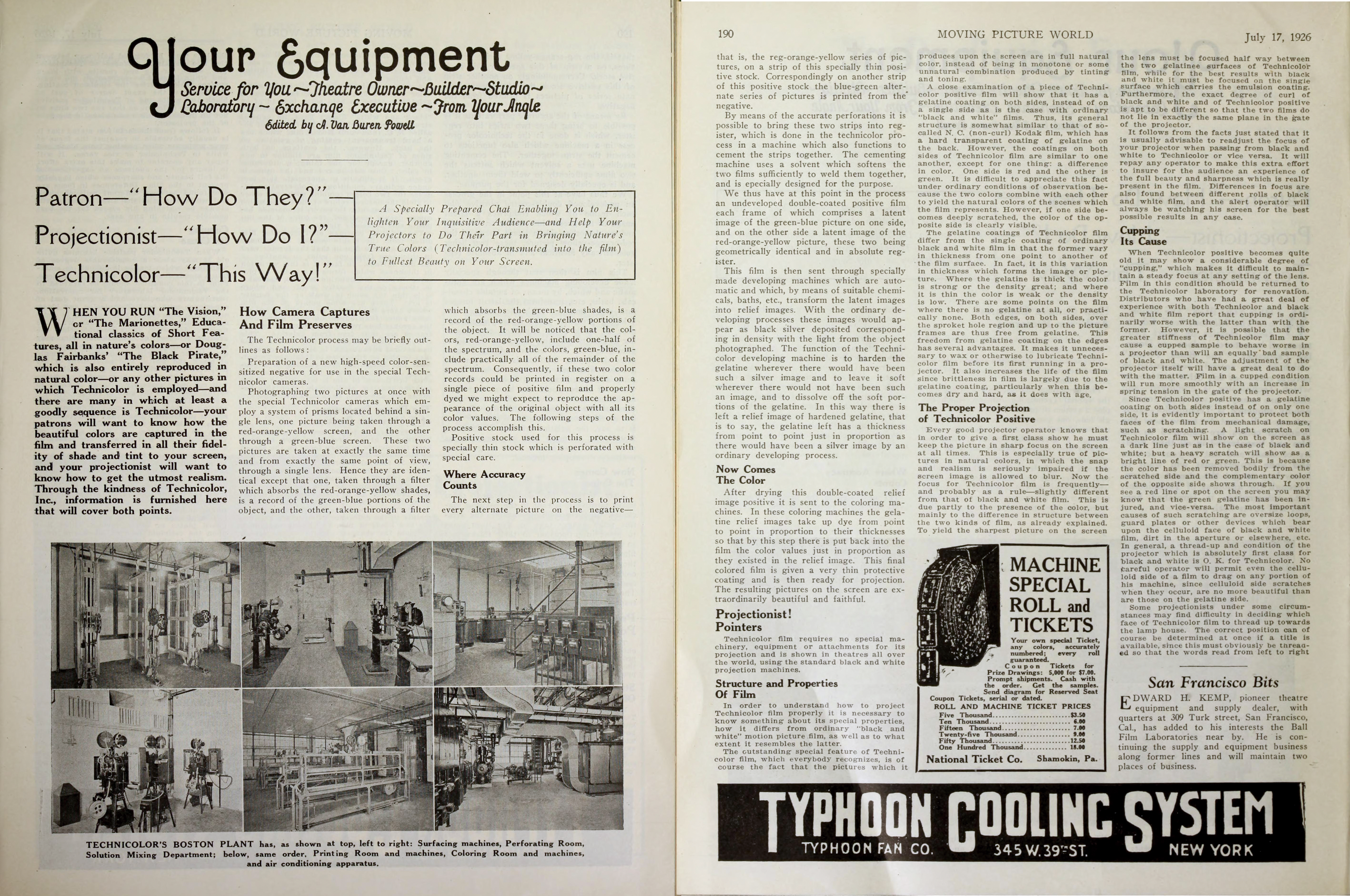
Warning for theater operators (1926) and article published in The Moving Picture World in July 1926 to explain to operators how Technicolor film is produced and the necessity of developing between the two positives glued together.

While specialized operators had supervised the screening of the premieres, many difficulties arise during the screening in ordinary theaters. In particular because projectionists, after screening black-and-white newsreels, refrained from changing the setting of their projectors, despite the recommendations given to them by Technicolor to avoid problems related to operating errors.

The double emulsion process not only poses problems with adjusting the sharpness of the projection but also makes the film more prone to scratches and poor workmanship, such as air bubbles between the two glued strips that create blurring. In addition, the humidity variations and the contraction caused by the heat released by the arc lamps of the projectors create curves (cupping) that prevent focus and sometimes cause the film to detach, making it unusable. It was then necessary to return these films to the Technicolor laboratory in Boston for repair, or even to prepare replacement copies and make them quickly available anywhere. Herbert Kalmus summed it up: "the film was a great success but our troubles never ended". These setbacks had the opposite effect to that expected by Technicolor, as commercial success revealed technical failure. They caused apprehension among the studios and, consequently, a contraction of Technicolor's order book.

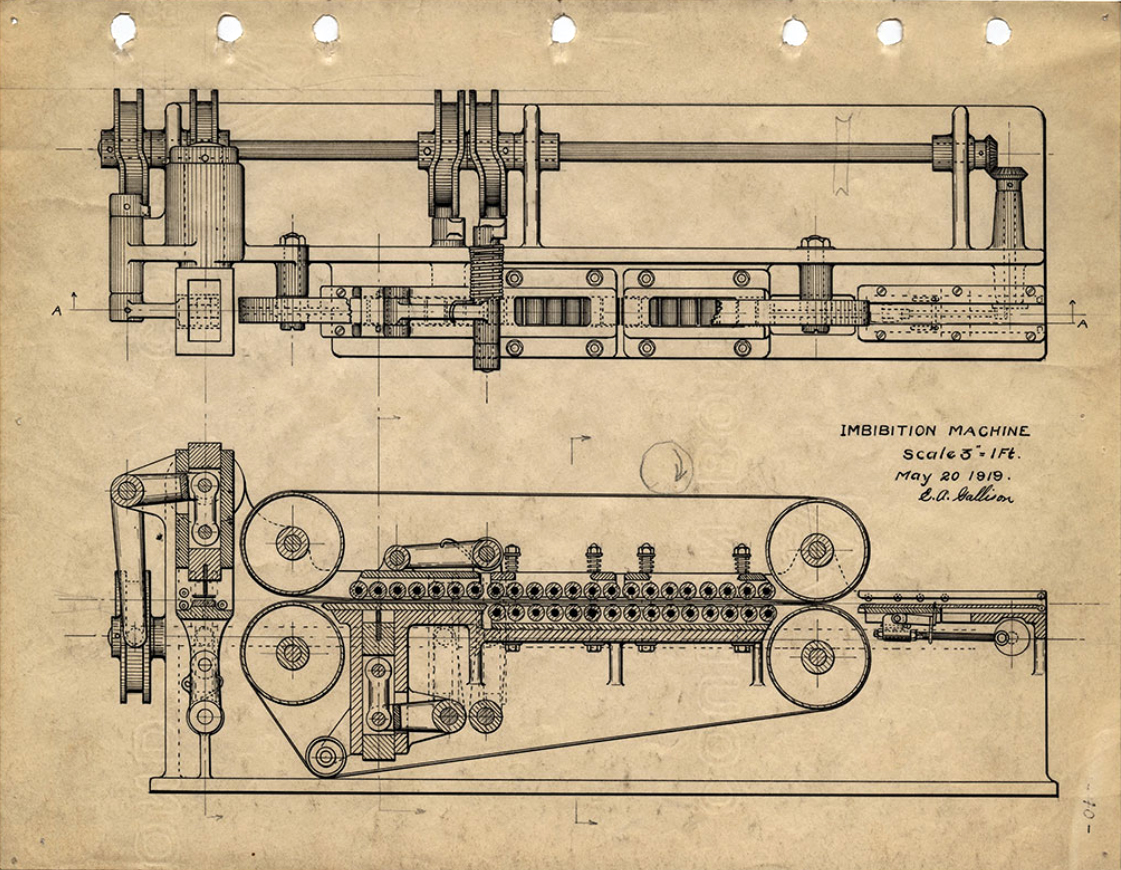
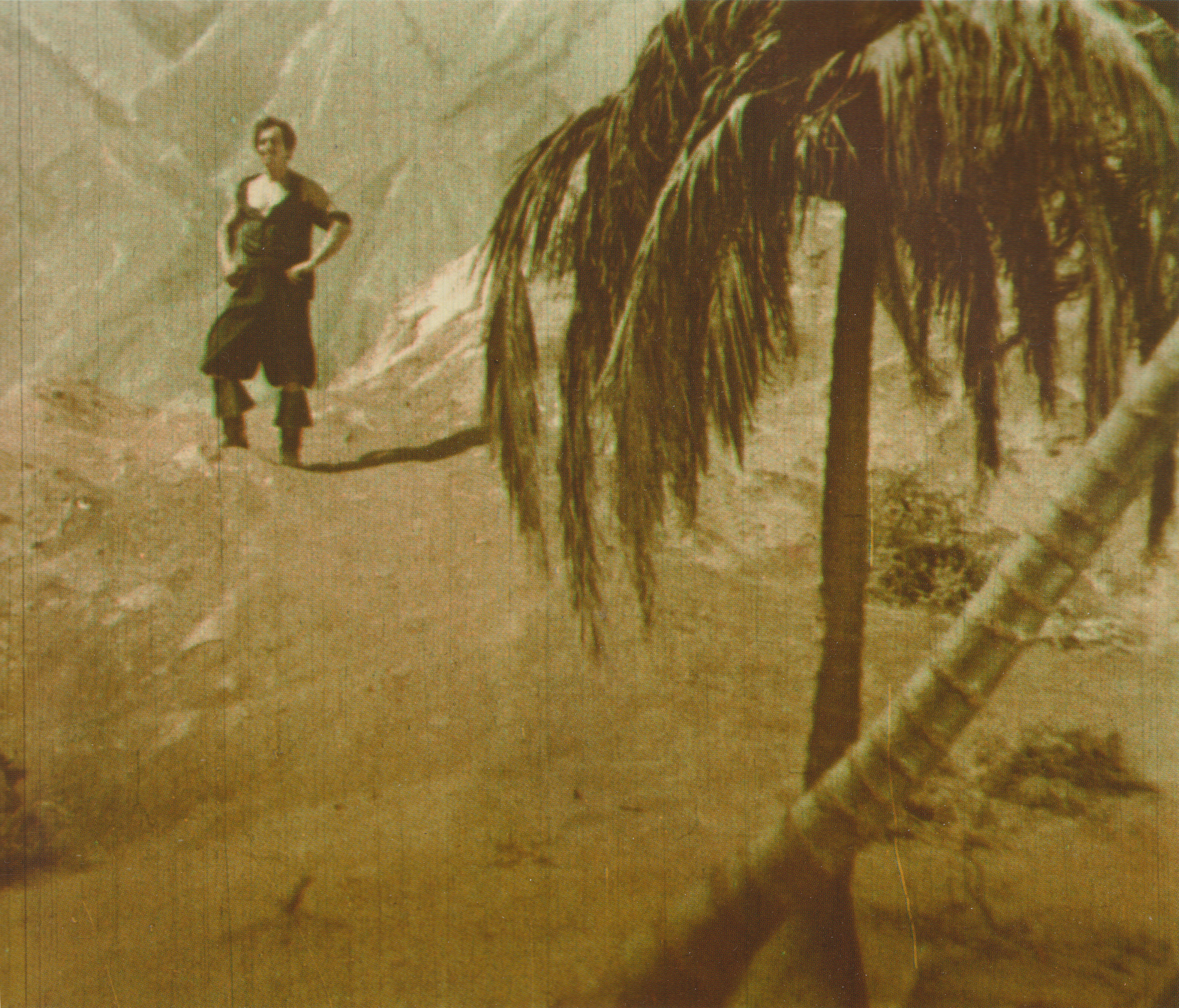
On the left, one of Technicolor's first imbibition machine projects (1919). On the right, a surviving still of an imbibition copy (Technicolor process no. 3).

Technicolor did not design the two-strip glued process used to produce The Black Pirate as the best possible solution, but as a step in a gradual process leading to the superimposition of several layers of color on a single film. To achieve this, the engineers had broken down the problem into several aspects, first the production of tanned matrices, glued together at first (Technicolor Process No. 2), then the imbibition of the reliefs by dyes and their transfer by hydrotypic discharge (Note: The term refers to the process invented by Charles Cros and patented in 1880 of using, for color reproduction, the property of bichromate gelatin to "expand in areas that have not been affected by light and to absorb, in those areas, the coloring solution".) on a neutral film coated with a layer of etched gelatin (Technicolor Process No. 3). Unlike Technicolor process 2, the two positives obtained by the separation carried out behind the lens are not intended to be colored, but hardened, to form "matrices" that allow, like the lithographic process, printing on a neutral support. The principle of this process was discovered by Technicolor engineers before 1925. Still, a disagreement with Kalmus, leading to a split within the company, delayed the development of the process, which was therefore not usable for the release of The Black Pirate. However, the desire to meet Fairbanks' demands and, above all, to satisfy him enough to obtain the market for his next film led Technicolor's managers to hasten the development of an imbibition process. Fairbanks was particularly concerned about the lack of sharpness of the color image. He considered alleviating the problem by increasing the light output of the projectors. Still, he found that, while this solution did improve the depth of field, it increased the intensity of the color more than he had intended. The problem was solved by imbibition printing and the addition of a "blackened dye", i.e. a third pass adding a black "silhouette". Kalmus emphasizes the superiority of this three-layer print: "Flesh tones have more softness, more color, and there is no more excess red tone." He also notes the "very great difference in the clarity of the facial expression … the absence of grain, the regularity of the textures and a very satisfactory appearance of contrast and clarity".

The Black Pirate was in release long enough that copies of Technicolor No. 2 coexisted with others of Technicolor No. 3. As this last process allows for better preservation of the colors, the survival of such copies today provides valuable information for assessing the original colors, as the surviving copies in Technicolor No. 2 are unusable or very degraded.

== Aftermath ==
=== Fairbanks and Technicolor ===
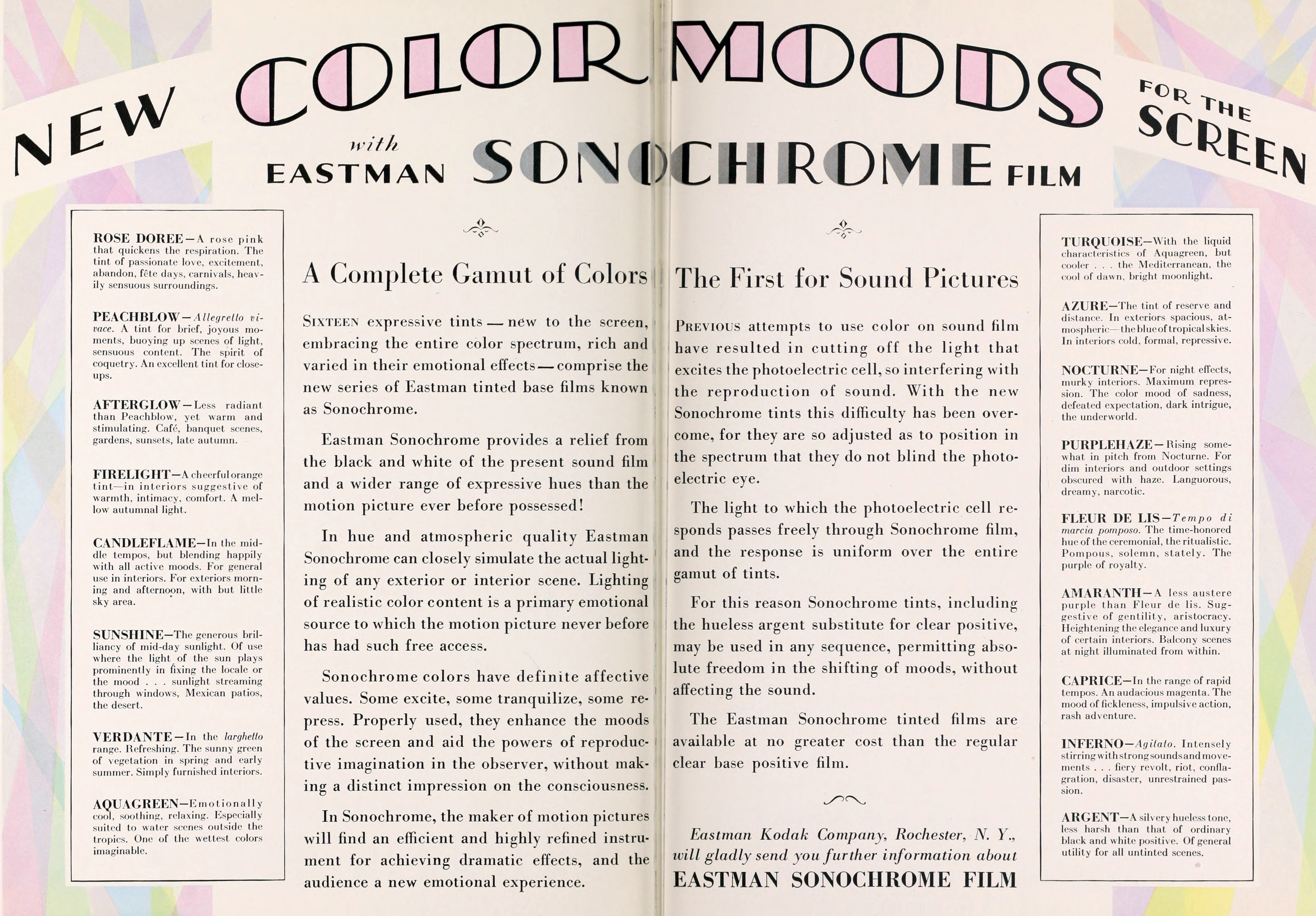
Mary Pickford's Technicolor essay for The Gaucho (1927), Fairbanks and Pickford's Technicolor essay fragment for The Taming of the Shrew (1929), and a Sonochrome advertisement (1929).

In February 1927, Fairbanks planned to shoot a new film that would become The Gaucho. He wondered if the subject required color, like piracy. Eager to obtain a new contract, Herbert Kalmus and his collaborators tried to show him that the new imbibition process solved both the problems of the fragility of the copies and those of color adjustment, thanks to the printing of a black layer that allows the color tone to be modulated during the print run. Fairbanks ran more than 3,000 meters of color tests in four different tones and was ready to exploit a broader chromatic palette than that of The Black Pirate. However, in June 1927, he decided to use color only for a prologue scene and a miracle scene, a process that seemed to confer dignity on Mary Pickford's representation of the Virgin. Two weeks before the premiere, he changed his mind again and completely renounced color, considering that "the mix of media is basically in bad taste". The Technicolor prologue, however, was kept for the world premiere at Grauman's Chinese Theatre, and for the New York premiere, at the Liberty Theatre.

In 1929, following the advent of talkies, Fairbanks decided to shoot The Taming of the Shrew with Mary Pickford, the only film in which they starred together as the lead actors. The film was first conceived and announced as being with sound and color. At that time, however, the Technicolor process had become more sought after. The limited number of cameras available meant that only one scene at the end of the film could be considered, for which a test was conducted. Due to the scheduling difficulties created by the high demand for Technicolor on other shoots, Fairbanks and Pickford renounced it.

To address the inability to use Technicolor, Fairbanks and Pickford turned to Sonochrome, a newly marketed, pre-tinted monochrome film by Eastman Kodak, which had only just begun to market with the argument that the dye did not mask the soundtrack. Selected from eighteen available shades, Sonochrome aimed to evoke a "warm Italian atmosphere". However, it proved to be a technical and commercial failure. Joshua Yumibe, nonetheless, argues that "color consciousness" was put forward for his promotion, even though it is rooted in archaic conceptions of the moral value of colors inherited from Goethe, which would be taken over a few years later by Natalie Kalmus to promote Technicolor.

=== Technicolor and pirate films ===
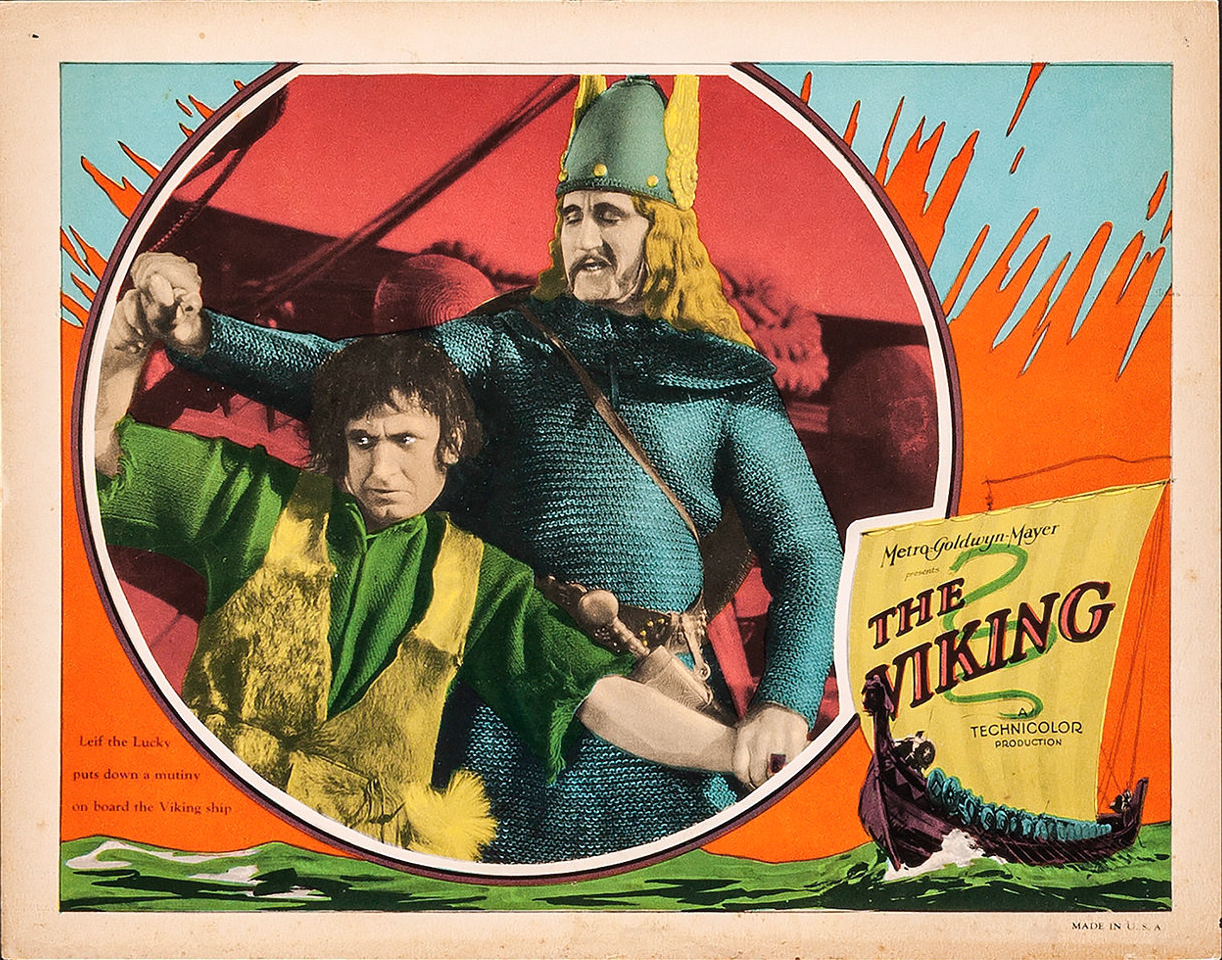
Publicity photograph for The Viking (1928), trailer of The Black Swan (1942), and trailer of The Crimson Pirate (1952).

The Black Pirate serves as a "hidden model" for the film The Viking (1928), directed by Roy William Neill. The latter, which evokes medieval Viking pirates, shared with Fairbanks the same screenwriter, Jack Cunningham, the same production designer, Carl Oscar Borg, the same production manager, Theodore Reed, and two of the lead actors, Donald Crisp and Anders Randolf. Technicolor produced it on a budget of $325,000 to prove the superiority of the imbibition process, both in terms of colors and film behavior. It was also the first full-length film in color to be accompanied by a musical soundtrack. Herbert Kalmus was closely responsible for all aspects of production and color control was overseen by his ex-wife Natalie Kalmus. Several authors believed that the film should have been nicknamed "The White Pirate" in so much so that it was imbued with a "Nordic romanticism", accentuated borrowing Richard Wagner's music onto the soundtrack, with heroine Pauline Starke's Valkyrie outfit and the striking color contrasts in the service of a "racialized" discourse on the history of the settlement of the United States. The film met with only limited success, except communities of Scandinavian origin, which Herbert Kalmus attributes to the American public's preference for hairless faces, while long moustaches, like the one worn by Donald Crisp in the film, sometimes "fill the whole screen".

Several other films attest to the special link between pirates and color in cinema that Fairbanks intuited. In particular, The Black Swan, a 1942 big-budget film based on a novel by Rafael Sabatini, received an Academy Award for its use of three-color Technicolor, which gave saturated colors to sunsets and Maureen O'Hara's red hair. This film made it possible, thanks to the three-color Technicolor, to highlight the three colors of "special significance" for the pirate film as a genre, blue, black, and red. It inaugurated a second wave of association of the Technicolor process with pirate themes, culminating with The Crimson Pirate (1952), which was more "carnivalesque" and less "flamboyant". Several critics have noted the similarity between Burt Lancaster's acrobatics and those of Fairbanks, as well as the nod to an underwater scene. After the latter, the genre of the color pirate film experienced a decline, due to budget constraints, changes in viewers' expectations, and monotony.

== Restoration and home media ==
The copyright for The Black Pirate is now in the public domain. In 1999, a restored print was released on DVD by Kino Video. A blu-ray edition, also from Kino was released in 2004 and reissued by them in 2010. In 2023, a new Blu-ray edition from the Cohen Media Group was released on a double-bill with Robin Hood.

The Black Pirate was given a major restoration in 2023 by the Museum of Modern Art (MoMA) in New York. As MoMA curator Dave Kehr explains:

The restoration of The Black Pirate required returning to the original camera negatives for the first time in 50 years. Fairbanks shot the film with five cameras simultaneously, creating four color negatives and one black-and-white. The restoration process required the painstaking review of hundreds of film cans containing unedited raw footage from the B, C, and D negatives. Additionally, three edited reels of the long-lost A negative—the preferred source—were rediscovered in the process and became central to the restoration. Modern digital restoration techniques were used to faithfully reconstruct the film's original color scheme. The red and green color records were precisely realigned, and missing shots were culled from across the different negatives. Although no original color prints of The Black Pirate are known to survive, an early test reel printed in Technicolor's dye-transfer process, combined with documentation in the Technicolor archive, allowed the original look to be recreated. With its rich browns and greens, the results look quite a bit different from the thin, gray colors of the previous photochemical restoration.

This restored print received its world premiere at the BFI London Film Festival on October 15, 2023. It was also screened at the San Francisco Silent Film Festival on April 10, 2024, and at the Academy Museum of Motion Pictures in Hollywood on November 24, 2024.

== Legacy ==
Fairbanks biographer Jeffrey Vance maintains that "The Black Pirate was the most carefully prepared and controlled work of Fairbanks's entire career" and "the most important feature-length silent film designed entirely for color cinematography." Vance believes the limitations imposed by early Technicolor forced him to remove the "pageantry and visual effects" of his earlier swashbuckler and produce a straightforward action adventure. "The result was a refreshing return to form and a dazzling new showcase for the actor-producer's favorite production value: himself. Fairbanks is resplendent as the bold buccaneer and buoyed by a production brimming with rip-roaring adventure and spiced with exceptional stunts and swordplay, including the celebrated 'sliding down the sails' sequence, arguably the most famous set piece of the entire Fairbanks treasure chest."

== Bibliography ==
- Primary sources
  - United Artists (1926a). Douglas Fairbanks in "The Black Pirate". New York: Longacre Press. "Souvenir program sold to the film's audience."
  - United Artists (1926b) (1926). Exhibitor's Campaign Book: Douglas Fairbanks in "The Black Pirate". Los Angeles: United Artists. "Promotional booklet intended for operators."
- Secondary sources magazine
  - Behlmer, Rudy (1992a). "High Style on the High Seas". American Cinematographer. Vol. 73, no. 4.
  - Behlmer, Rudy (1992b). "The Black Pirate Weighs Anchor". American Cinematographer. Vol. 73, no. 5.
  - Belton, John (2018). "Taking the color out of color: Two-Colour Technicolor, The Black Pirate, and Blackened Dyes". In Fossati, r1=Giovanna; Jackson, Victoria; Lameris, Bregt G.; Street, Sarah; Yumibe, Joshua (eds.). The Colour Fantastic. Amsterdam: Amsterdam University Press. pp. 97–108. doi:10.1515/9789048532988-006. ISBN 978-90-485-3298-8.
  - Eisenschitz, Bernard (1970). Douglas Fairbanks, 1883–1939: Anthologie du cinéma [Douglas Fairbanks, 1883–1939: Anthology of Cinema] (in French). Vol. 5. Paris: L'Avant-Scène.
  - Goessel, Tracey (2016). The First King of Hollywood:The Life of Douglas Fairbanks. Chicago: Chicago Review Press.
  - Harris, Neil (1990). Cultural Marketing Appetites and Cultural Tastes in Modern America. Chicago: University of Chicago Press. pp. 307–308.
  - Layton, James; Pierce, David (2015). The Dawn of Technicolor, 1915–1935. Rochester: George Eastman House.
  - Lunde, Arne (2011). Nordic Exposures: Scandinavian Identities in Classical Hollywood Cinema. Seattle: University of Washington Press.
  - Martin, Jessie (2013). Le Cinéma en couleurs [The Cinema in Colors] (in French). Paris: Armand Colin.
  - Rennie, Neil (2013). Treasure Neverland: Real and Imaginary Pirates. Oxford: Oxford University Press.
  - Richards, Jeffrey (1977). Swordsmen of the Screen: From Douglas Fairbanks to Michael York. Londres: Routledge and Kegan Paul.
  - Street, Sarah; Yumibe, Joshua (2019). Chromatic Modernity: Color, Cinema, and Media of the 1920s. New York: Columbia University Press.
  - Studlar, Gaylyn (1996). "Building Mr. Pep: Boy Culture and the Construction of Douglas Fairbanks". This Mad Masquerade: Stardom and Masculinity in the Jazz Age. New York: Columbia University Press.
  - Tibbetts, John C.; Welsh, James M. (1977). His Majesty the American: The Cinema of Douglas Fairbanks, Sr. South Brunswick: A. S. Barnes.
  - Tibbetts, John C.; Welsh, James M. (2014). Douglas Fairbanks and the American Century. Jackson: University Press of Mississippi.
  - Vance, Jeffrey; Maietta, Tony (2008). Douglas Fairbanks. Berkeley: University of California Press.
  - Yumibe, Joshua (2012). Moving Color: Early Film, Mass Culture, Modernism. New Brunswick: Rutgers University Press.
  - Zhanial, Susanne (2019). Postmodern Pirates: Tracing the Development of the Pirate Motif with Disney's Pirates of the Caribbean. Leiden: Brill.

== See also ==
- List of early color feature films
