= Kenneth Davenport =

American actor

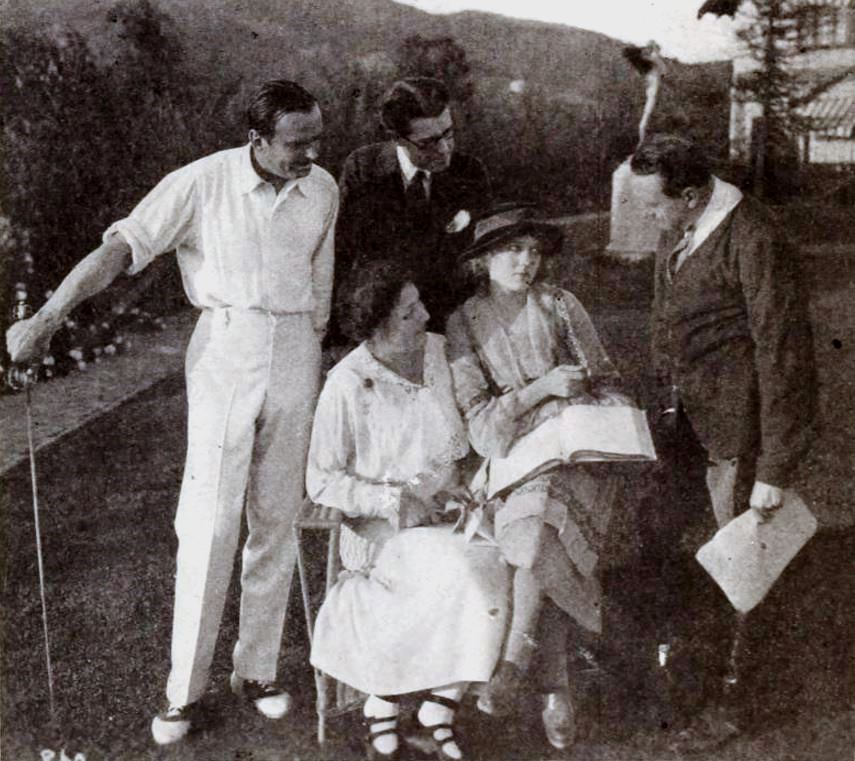
- Script advisory committee for The Three Musketeers (1921) with Douglas Fairbanks, Kenneth Davenport, Lotta Woods, Mary Pickford, and Edward Knoblock
- Born: Kenneth Davenport Cassidy; February 20, 1879; Macon, Missouri
- Died: November 10, 1941 (aged 62); Los Angeles, California
- Occupations: film actor, screenwriter
- Years active: 1915

Kenneth Davenport (February 20, 1879 – November 10, 1941), was an American film actor and screenwriter. He appeared in 9 films in 1915 and wrote two novels.

He was born in Missouri and died in Los Angeles, California.

== Selected filmography ==
- The Nut (1921)
- Robin Hood (1922)
