= Charles Stevens (actor) =

American actor (1893–1964)

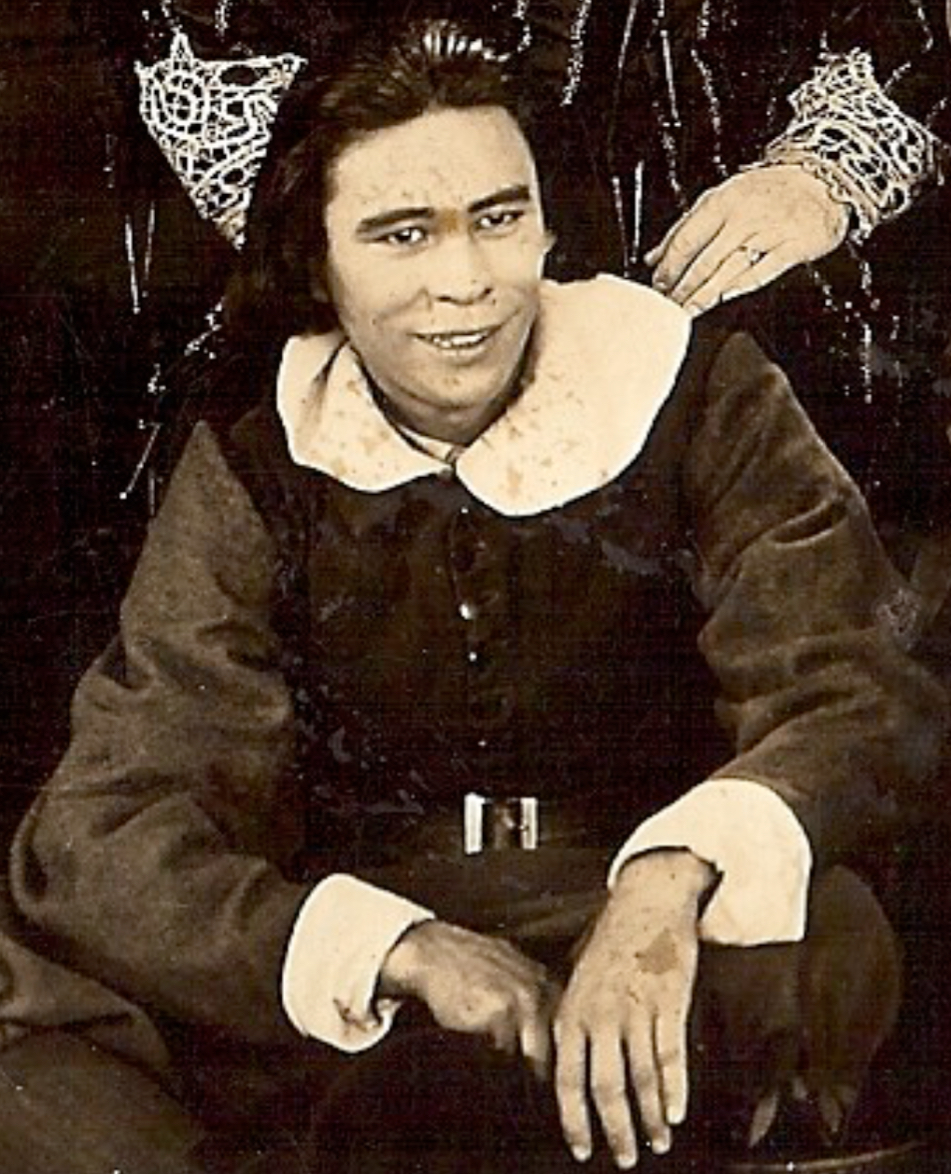
- Stevens in The Three Musketeers (1921)
- Born: May 26, 1893; Solomonville, Arizona, U.S.
- Died: August 22, 1964 (aged 71); Hollywood, Los Angeles, California, U.S.
- Resting place: Valhalla Memorial Park Cemetery, North Hollywood
- Occupation: Actor
- Years active: 1915–1961
- Spouse: Lila Stevens (1918–?) (1 child)

Charles Stevens (May 26, 1893 – August 22, 1964) was an American actor. He appeared in nearly 200 films between 1915 and 1961. A close friend of actor Douglas Fairbanks, Stevens appeared in nearly all of Fairbanks' films.

== Early years ==
Stevens was born in Solomonville, Arizona, and his father was a white Arizona sheriff named George Stevens and mother a Mexican woman named Eloisa Michelena. Stevens was not, as many bios claim, the grandson of Geronimo. That erroneous information could be attributed to Stevens himself, who claimed such kinship, and film studios that promoted the supposed lineage.

== Career ==
Stevens began his career during the silent era, playing mostly Native Americans and Mexicans in Westerns. During the 1930s and 1940s, he had roles in the film serials Wild West Days and Overland Mail. In the 1950s, Stevens guest-starred on several television series, including The Adventures of Wild Bill Hickok, The Adventures of Kit Carson, Sky King, The Lone Ranger, Zorro, and The Adventures of Rin Tin Tin. In two of those appearances in The Adventures of Rin Tin Tin, in 1954 and 1958, he played Geronimo.

He made his last onscreen appearance in the film The Outsider (1961), starring Tony Curtis.

== Death ==
Stevens died on August 22, 1964, and is buried in Valhalla Memorial Park in North Hollywood in Los Angeles County, California.

== Filmography ==
Film
Year	Title	Role	Notes
1915	The Birth of a Nation	Volunteer	Film debut, Uncredited
1915	The Lamb	Lieutenant	Uncredited
1915	Fatherhood	Looey Jim	Uncredited
1915	Martyrs of the Alamo	Mexican Soldier	Uncredited
1915	Double Trouble	Thief	Uncredited
1916	The Good Bad-Man	Bandit	Uncredited
1916	American Aristocracy	Mexican	Uncredited
1916	The Matrimaniac	Lineman	Uncredited
1916	The Americano	Col. Gargaras	
1917	Wild and Woolly	Pedro	
1917	The Man from Painted Post	Henchman	
1917	Reaching for the Moon	Boris' Lieutenant	Uncredited
1917	A Modern Musketeer	Indian	Uncredited
1918	Six Shooter Andy	Mexican John	
1918	Mr. Fix-It	Gangster	Uncredited
1918	M'Liss	Mexican	Uncredited
1918	He Comes Up Smiling	Townsman	Uncredited
1919	His Majesty, the American	Officer	Uncredited
1920	The Mollycoddle	Yellow Horse	
1920	The Mark of Zorro	Peon Beaten by Sgt. Gonzalez	Uncredited
1921	The Nut	Henchman	Uncredited
1921	The Three Musketeers	Planchet	
1922	Moran of the Lady Letty	Seaman	Uncredited
1922	The Primitive Lover	Pedro	
1922	Robin Hood	Prince John's Aide	Alternative title: Douglas Fairbanks in Robin Hood
1922	Captain Fly-by-Night	Indian	
1923	Where the North Begins	The Fox	
1924	The Thief of Bagdad	Persian Prince's Awaker	Uncredited
1924	Empty Hands	Indian Guide	
1924	The Iron Horse	Indian	Uncredited
1925	Recompense	Mosheshoe	
1925	Don Q, Son of Zorro	Robledo	
1925	A Son of His Father	Pablo	
1925	The Vanishing American	Shoie	
1925	Tumbleweeds	Indian	Uncredited
1926	The Black Pirate	Powder Man	
1926	Mantrap	Lawrence Jackfish (Indian Guide)	
1926	Across the Pacific	Emilio Aguinaldo	
1926	The Temptress	Argentine Reveler	Uncredited
1927	The King of Kings	Beggar	Uncredited
1927	Woman's Law		
1927	Now We're in the Air	Knife Thrower	Uncredited
1927	The Gaucho	The Gaucho's First Lieutenant	
1928	Stand and Deliver	Pietro	
1928	Diamond Handcuffs	Niambo	
1929	The Iron Mask	Planchet	
1929	Tide of Empire	Indian Servant	Uncredited
1929	The Mysterious Dr. Fu Manchu	Singh	Uncredited
1929	Rio Rita	José	Uncredited
1929	The Taming of the Shrew	Servant	Uncredited
1929	The Virginian	Pedro	Uncredited
1930	The Arizona Kid	Mine Mexican	Uncredited
1930	The Big Trail	Lopez	
1930	Tom Sawyer	Injun Joe	
1931	The Cisco Kid	Lopez	
1931	The Conquering Horde	John	
1931	The Cisco Kid	Lopez	
1932	The Gay Caballero	Messenger	Uncredited
1932	South of the Rio Grande	Pedro	
1932	The Broken Wing	Chicken Thief	
1932	The Stoker	Ernesto	
1932	Mystery Ranch	Tonto - Henchman	
1932	Chandu the Magician	Ali	Uncredited
1932	Heritage of the Desert	Pancho	Uncredited
1932	Tex Takes a Holiday	Henchman	
1932	The Golden West	Indian	Uncredited
1933	Sensation Hunters	Indian Joe	Uncredited
1933	Drum Taps	Indian Joe	
1933	The California Trail	Juan	
1933	When Strangers Marry	Chattermahl	
1933	The Woman I Stole	Crewman	Uncredited
1933	Police Call	Gang Leader	
1933	Fury of the Jungle	Kimba	
1933	The Perils of Pauline	Lee	Serial, Uncredited
1934	Man of Two Worlds	Eskimo	Uncredited
1934	Call of the Coyote: A Legend of the Golden West	Pancho	
1934	Viva Villa!	Pascal's Staff	Uncredited
1934	The Trumpet Blows	Sheriff Mejias	Uncredited
1934	Grand Canary	Cabbie	Uncredited
1934	La Cucaracha	Pancho's Valet	Short, Uncredited
1934	Wake Up and Dream	2nd Indian	Uncredited
1934	Behold My Wife!	Apache Herder	Uncredited
1935	The Lives of a Bengal Lancer	McGregor's Servant	Uncredited
1935	Rumba	Counterfeit Lottery Ticket Vendor	Uncredited
1935	Under the Pampas Moon	Groom	Uncredited
1935	Call of the Wild	Francois	
1936	Rose of the Rancho	Peon Spy	Uncredited
1936	Here Comes Trouble	Malay Mike	
1936	Give Us This Night	Fisherman	
1936	Robin Hood of El Dorado	Wedding Guest / Bandit	Uncredited
1936	The Country Beyond	Half-Breed	Uncredited
1936	Aces and Eights	Captain Felipe de Lopez	
1936	The Plainsman	Injun Charley	Uncredited
1936	The Bold Caballero	Captain Vargas	Alternative title: The Bold Cavalier
1937	Fair Warning	Miguel	Uncredited
1937	Swing High, Swing Low	Panamanian at Cockfight	Uncredited
1937	The Last Train from Madrid	Peasant	Uncredited
1937	Wild West Days	Buckskin Frank	
1937	Ebb Tide	Uncle Ned	
1937	Thank You, Mr. Moto	Ning	Uncredited
1938	Forbidden Valley	Blackjack	
1938	The Crime of Doctor Hallet	Talamu	
1938	The Adventures of Marco Polo	Mongol Warrior	Uncredited
1938	Tropic Holiday	Peón	Uncredited
1938	Flaming Frontiers	Breed - Henchman	Serial
1938	The Renegade Ranger	Manuel	
1938	Red Barry	Capt. Moy	Serial
1938	Flirting with Fate	Garcia's Chauffeur	Uncredited
1939	Union Pacific	Indian Shooting Mollie	Uncredited
1939	Man of Conquest	Zavola	Uncredited
1939	The Girl and the Gambler	Andres	
1939	The Oregon Trail	Henchman Breed	Serial
1939	Frontier Marshal	Indian Charlie	
1939	Desperate Trails	Henchman Ortega	
1939	The Real Glory	Captured Native Giving Guns' Location	Uncredited
1939	Geronimo	Indian	Uncredited
1939	The Mad Empress	Diaz's Messenger	Uncredited
1940	The Man Who Wouldn't Talk	Mexican	Uncredited
1940	Charlie Chan in Panama	Native Fisherman	Uncredited
1940	Wagons Westward	Pima	
1940	Winners of the West	Snakeye	Serial
1940	Untamed	Indian Trapper	Uncredited
1940	South to Karanga	Native	
1940	Kit Carson	Ruiz	
1940	North West Mounted Police	Half-breed Archer	Uncredited
1940	The Mark of Zorro	Jose	Uncredited
1940	Behind the News	Carlos Marquez	Uncredited
1941	White Eagle	Henchman	Serial, Uncredited
1941	The Bad Man	Venustiano	
1941	Blood and Sand	Pablo Gómez	
1941	Forced Landing	Migalos - Prisoner	Uncredited
1941	Roaring Frontiers	Moccasin	
1941	The Corsican Brothers	Shepherd	Uncredited
1942	Tombstone, the Town Too Tough to Die	Indian Charley	
1942	Beyond the Blue Horizon	Panao	
1942	Pierre of the Plains	Crying Loon	
1942	Halfway to Shanghai	Ali	
1942	Manila Calling	Filipino	Uncredited
1942	Overland Mail	Puma - Henchman	Serial
1942	Here We Go Again	Indian	Uncredited
1944	Michael Strogoff	Secuaz de Tártaro	
1944	El as negro		
1944	Marked Trails	Denver - Henchman	
1944	The Mummy's Curse	Achilles	
1945	Bad Men of the Border	Juan	Uncredited
1945	South of the Rio Grande	Sebastian	
1945	Bandits of the Badlands	Rusty	Uncredited
1945	San Antonio	Sojer Harris	Uncredited
1945	Adventure	Man in Cantina	Uncredited
1946	Border Bandits	Jose	
1946	Tangier	Juan	Uncredited
1946	My Darling Clementine	Indian Charlie	Uncredited
1947	Sinbad the Sailor	Ruri	Uncredited
1947	Buffalo Bill Rides Again	White Mountain	
1947	The Homestretch	Mexican Father	Uncredited
1947	Calcutta	Strangler	Uncredited
1947	Ride the Pink Horse	Drunk Mexican	Uncredited
1947	The Exile	Painter	
1948	Saigon	Susan's Driver	Uncredited
1948	Fury at Furnace Creek	José Artego	Uncredited
1948	Coroner Creek	Indian	Uncredited
1948	Return of the Bad Men	Grey Eagle	Uncredited
1948	Belle Starr's Daughter	Cherokee Joe	
1948	The Feathered Serpent	Manuel	Uncredited
1949	The Walking Hills	Cleve	Uncredited
1949	Roll, Thunder, Roll!	Felipe, El Conejo rider	
1949	The Cowboy and the Indians	Broken Arm	
1950	Ambush	Diablito	
1950	A Ticket to Tomahawk	Trancos	Uncredited
1950	Fortunes of Captain Blood	Juan Otlas	Uncredited
1950	The Savage Horde	Morellis	
1950	The Showdown	Indian Joe	
1950	Indian Territory	Soma	Uncredited
1950	California Passage	Pedro	
1951	Oh! Susanna	Charlie Grass	
1951	Warpath	Courier	
1952	Smoky Canyon	Johnny Big Foot	Uncredited
1952	Rose of Cimarron	Lone Indian on Trail	Uncredited
1952	The Lion and the Horse	Deputy Britt	
1952	Wagons West	Kaw Chief	(credit only)
1953	Tropic Zone	Macario's Grandfather	Uncredited
1953	Savage Mutiny	Chief Wamai	
1953	San Antone	Mexican	Uncredited
1953	Jeopardy	Mexican Father	Uncredited
1953	Ride, Vaquero!	Vaquero	
1953	The Stand at Apache River	Apache Indian	Uncredited
1953	Conquest of Cochise	Apache Brave	Uncredited
1953	Escape from Fort Bravo	Eilota	Uncredited
1954	Jubilee Trail	Pablo	
1954	Gunfighters of the Northwest	Cariboo	Serial, Uncredited
1954	Man with the Steel Whip	Blackjack Sam	Serial, Uncredited
1954	Killer Leopard	Tony Gonzales	Uncredited
1954	Green Fire	Bandit	Uncredited
1955	The Last Command	Peon Villager	Uncredited
1955	The Vanishing American	Quah-Tan	
1956	Pardners	Indian	Uncredited
1956	The Ten Commandments	Slave	Uncredited
1957	Duel at Apache Wells	Mexican	Uncredited
1959	Last Train from Gun Hill	Keno	Uncredited
1960	Oklahoma Territory	Tom Badger	Uncredited
1961	The Outsider	Joseph Hayes	(final film role)
Television
Year	Title	Role	Notes
1950–1956	The Lone Ranger	Red Moon / Various	5 episodes
1952–1953	The Adventures of Kit Carson	Chief Gray Wolf / Various	6 episodes
1953–1960	Death Valley Days	Bill / Red Cloud / Various	7 episodes
1954–1958	The Adventures of Rin Tin Tin	Geronimo / Pedro / Wynoki	5 episodes
1955–1956	Sergeant Preston of the Yukon	Kluk-Wan, Medicine Man / Ataksuk	2 episodes
1956	My Friend Flicka	Deerfoot	1 episode
1957	Broken Arrow	Neche / Old Man	2 episodes
1957	Zorro	Half-breed Informer / Josafat	2 episodes
1957	The Adventures of Jim Bowie	Pinal / Medicine Man	2 episodes
1957–1958	Wagon Train	Old Indian / Medicine Man	2 episodes
1958	Sugarfoot	Charlie Falling Horse / Saba / Charlie	3 episodes
1958–1961	Bronco	Shad / Daniel Webster / Yellow Claw	3 episodes
1959	Laramie	Indian	1 episode
1960	Law of the Plainsman	Escudero	1 episode
1960	The Alaskans	Chinook	2 episodes
1960	Maverick	Indian Chief	1 episode
1960	The Magical World of Disney	Old Dying Indian	1 episode
1960–1961	Rawhide	Old Indian/Sub-Chief	2 episodes
