= Handschiegl color process =

Artificial coloring process for motion picture film

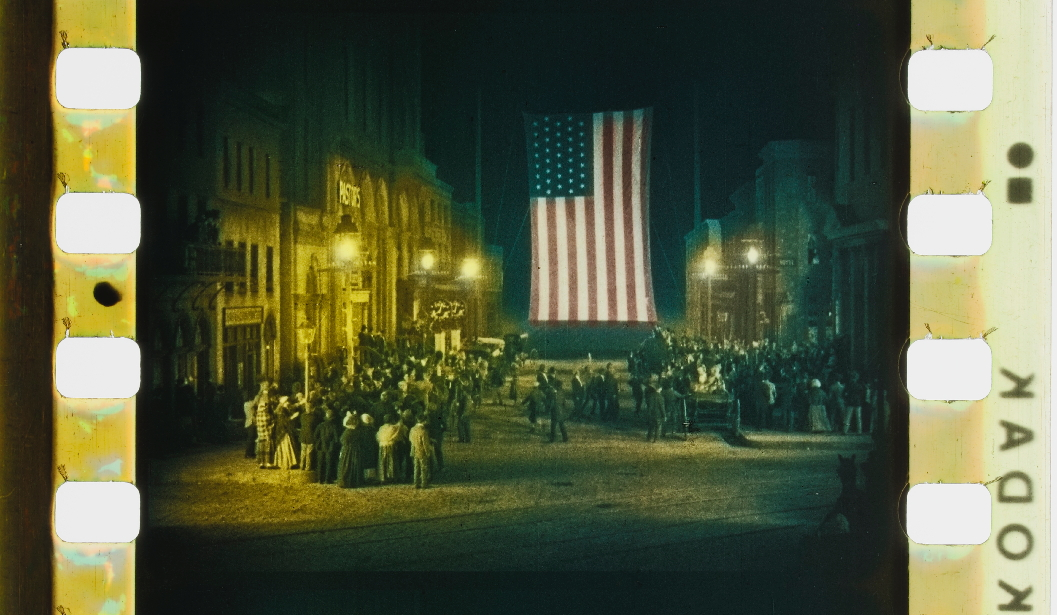
Color applied to a print of Lights of Old Broadway through the Handschiegl process

The Handschiegl color process (U.S. patent 1,303,836, U.S. patent 1,303,837, App: Nov 20, 1916, Iss: May 13, 1919) produced motion picture film prints with color artificially added to selected areas of the image. Aniline dyes were applied to a black-and-white print using gelatin imbibition matrices.

== History of the process ==
The process was invented in 1916 for Cecil B. DeMille's production of Joan the Woman (1917) by engraver Max Handschiegl and partner Alvin W. Wyckoff, with assistance from Loren Taylor. All three were technicians at the studio where the film was shot, Famous Players–Lasky, later Paramount Studios. The system was originally advertised as the "Wyckoff" process, and later referred to in publicity as the "DeMille-Wyckoff" process.

For a time, the process was strictly used for Paramount releases only, but when Handschiegl and Wyckoff left Famous Players–Lasky, the process became known as the Handschiegl Color Process. Aside from Pathé's stencil process Pathéchrome, the Handschiegl process was the most widely used form of artificial coloring in motion pictures of the 1920s.

== Overview of how the process worked ==
Handschiegl described the invention thus: A separate, black-and-white print for each color to be applied was made. Using an opaque paint, portions of the image where color was to be applied were blocked out. A duplicate negative was made from the painted print and developed in a tanning developer, which hardened the gelatin layer where it had been exposed and developed. Those areas corresponding to the blocked out areas on the print remained relatively soft and capable of taking up dye. This dyed matrix film was brought into contact, in accurate register, with a positive print, to which the dye transferred in the appropriate areas. The print made several passes through the dye transfer machines, in contact with a separate matrix for each color. Usually, three colors were applied at the most.

Surviving examples of the process show that this technique was not always used. In some examples, stencils or simple hand coloring were employed. The process used most likely depended on variables such as speed and budget.

== Later years ==
The Handschiegl process was incorporated as part of Kelley Color in 1927 when Handschiegl and William Van Doren Kelley (inventor of Prizma) formed the company. In 1928, Kelley Color was, in turn, bought by Harriscolor.

== Known examples of Handschiegl color ==
- The Birth of a Nation (1915) – For prints re-issued after 1916
- Intolerance (1916)
- Joan the Woman (1917) – Red and yellow gave the scene of Joan of Arc burning at the stake a heightened dramatic effect
- The Devil-Stone (1917)
- Broken Blossoms (1919)
- Treasure Island (1920)
- The Heritage of the Red Man (1920) – Max Handschiegl credited as cinematographer
- Roman Candles (aka. Yankee Doodle, Jr.) (1920)
- The Three Musketeers (1921)
- A Blind Bargain (aka. The Octave of Claudius) (1922) – A party sequence had soap bubbles imbibed with several prismatic colors
- Red Lights (1923)
- The Ten Commandments (1923) – The crossing of the red sea had a blue tone and red Handschiegel technique on the masses crossing it
- The Big Parade (1925) – A shot of an ambulance stuck in the mud had its red cross colored appropriately
- Greed (1925) – Erich Von Stroheim's original 4-hour cut of the film was to have all gold items colored a brilliant gold-yellow
- Lights of Old Broadway (1925)
- The Merry Widow (1925)
- The Phantom of the Opera (1925) – The title character's flowing robes on the rooftop of the Opera House were dramatically colored red
- Sally (1925) (note: the 1929 version of this film used Technicolor)
- Seven Keys to Baldpate (1925)
- The Splendid Road (1925)
- The Fire Brigade (1926)
- The Flaming Forest (1926)
- The Girl from Montmartre (1926)
- The Greater Glory (1926)
- The Brown Derby (1926) – In a barbershop scene, too-hot towels are removed from Johnny Hines' face, which is lobster-red.
- Mike (1926)
- Volcano! (1926)
- The King of Kings (1927)
- Wings (1927) – Was used as visual effects for flames and explosions. Though the original negative was lost, the film's Handschiegl effects have been recreated for its latest restoration.

== See also ==
- Film colorization
- Film tinting
- Dye-transfer process
- Color motion picture film
- List of early color feature films
