= The Thief of Bagdad (1924 film) =

1924 film by Raoul Walsh

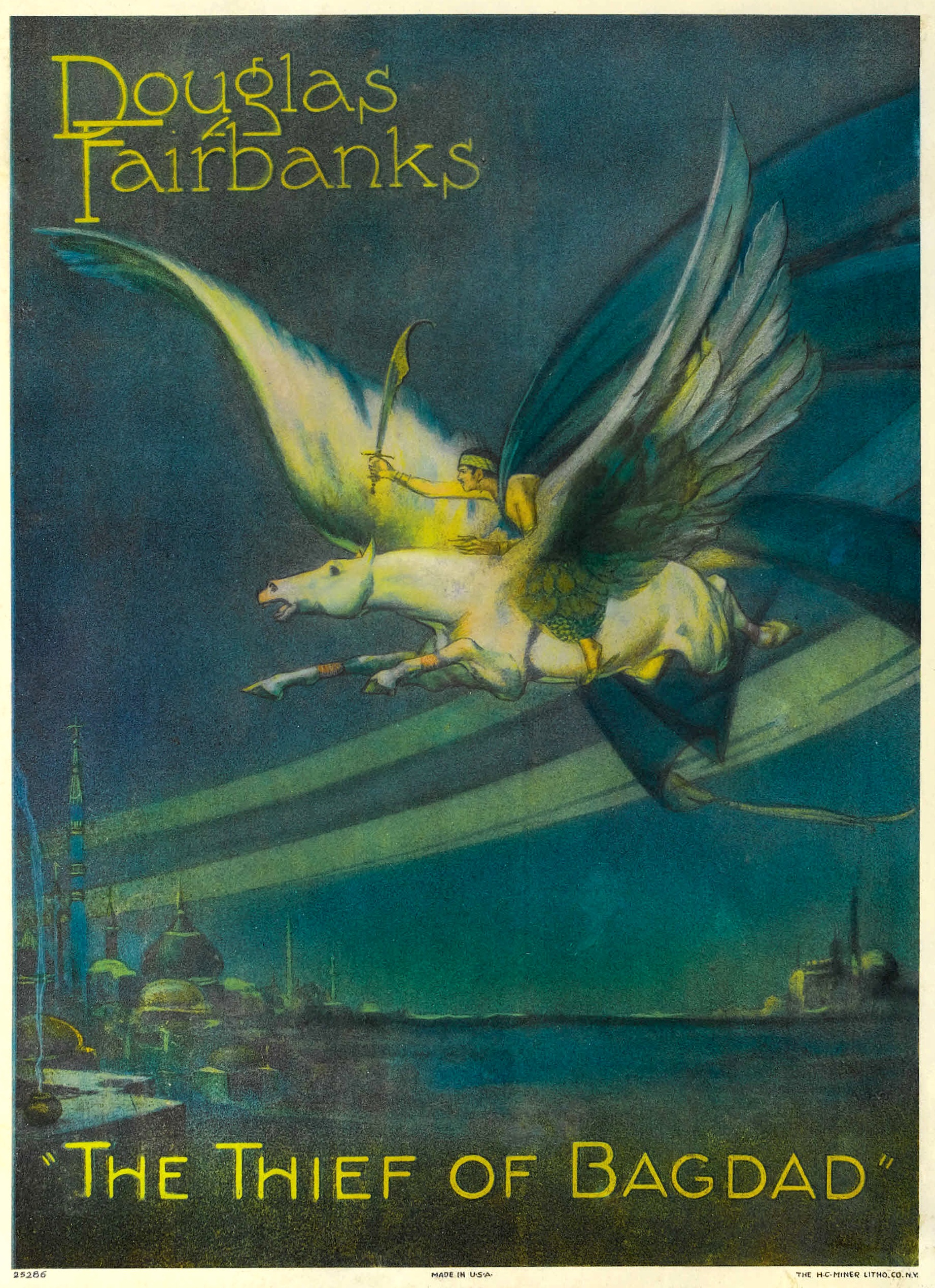
- Directed by: Raoul Walsh
- Screenplay by: Achmed Abdullah; Lotta Woods; James T. O'Donohoe (uncredited)
- Story by: Douglas Fairbanks
- Produced by: Douglas Fairbanks
- Starring: Douglas Fairbanks; Snitz Edwards; Charles Belcher; Julanne Johnston; Anna May Wong
- Cinematography: Arthur Edeson
- Edited by: William Nolan
- Music by: Mortimer Wilson
- Production company: Douglas Fairbanks Pictures
- Distributed by: United Artists
- Release date: March 18, 1924
- Running time: 140 minutes
- Country: United States
- Language: Silent (English intertitles)
- Budget: $1,135,654.65
- Box office: $3 million (U.S. and Canada rentals)

The Thief of Bagdad

The Thief of Bagdad is a 1924 American silent fantasy adventure film directed by Raoul Walsh and starring Douglas Fairbanks, and written by Achmed Abdullah and Lotta Woods. Adapted from One Thousand and One Nights, the film tells the story of a thief who falls in love with the daughter of the Caliph of Baghdad. In 1996, the film was selected for preservation in the United States National Film Registry by the Library of Congress as "culturally, historically, or aesthetically significant".

Fairbanks considered this to be the favorite of his films, according to his son. The imaginative gymnastics suited the athletic star, whose "catlike, seemingly effortless" movements were as much dance as gymnastics. Along with his earlier The Mark of Zorro (1920) and Robin Hood (1922), the film marked Fairbanks's transformation from genial comedy to a career in "swashbuckling" roles. The film, strong on special effects (flying carpet, magic rope and fearsome monsters) and featuring massive Arabian-style sets, also proved to be a stepping stone for Anna May Wong, who portrayed a treacherous Mongol slave.

The Thief of Bagdad is now widely considered one of the great silent films and Fairbanks's greatest work. Fairbanks biographer Jeffrey Vance writes, "An epic romantic fantasy-adventure inspired by several of the Arabian Nights tales, The Thief of Bagdad is the greatest artistic triumph of Fairbanks's career. The superb visual design, spectacle, imaginative splendor, and visual effects, along with his bravura performance (leading a cast of literally thousands), all contribute to making this his masterpiece."

The film was remade several times; the 1940 Technicolor version split the main character into two: a deposed prince and a thief, the latter played by Sabu.

== Plot ==
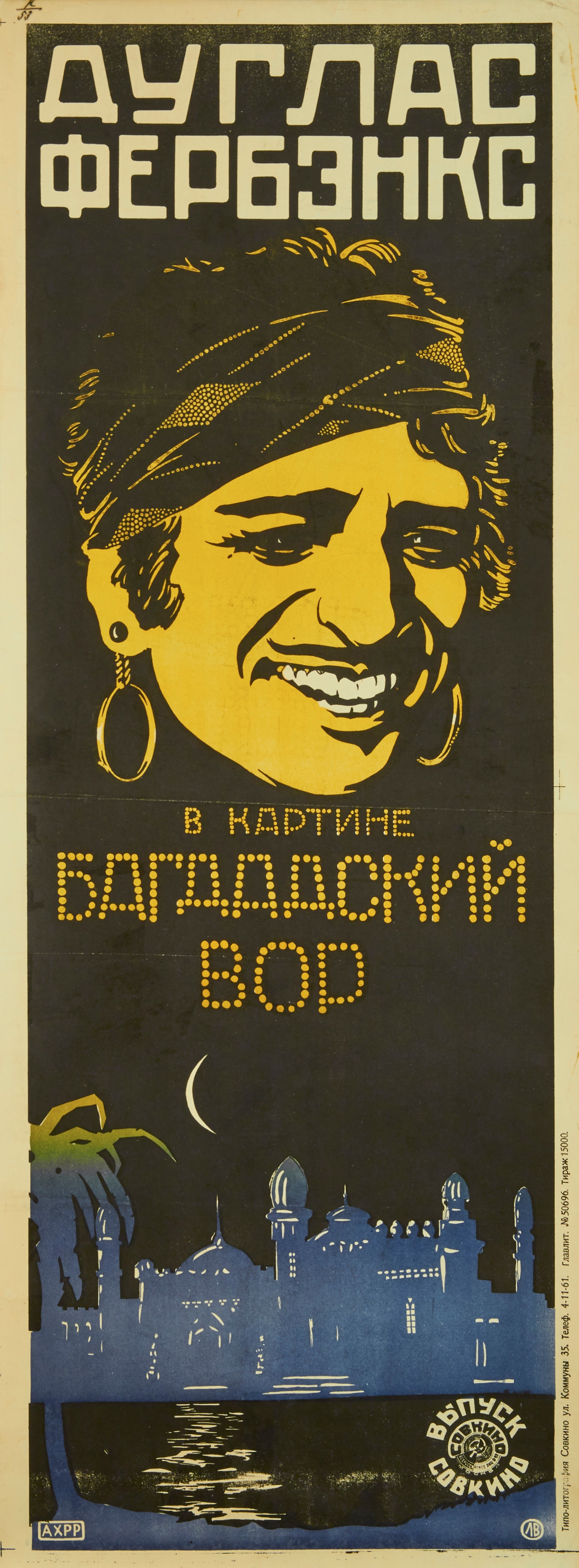
Soviet Russian film poster of The Thief of Bagdad, by Leonid Voronov

Ahmed steals as he pleases in the city of Bagdad. Wandering into a mosque, he tells a holy man he disdains his philosophy: "What I want, I take."

That night, he sneaks into the caliph's palace using a magic rope he stole during ritual prayers. All thoughts of plunder are forgotten when he sees the sleeping princess, the caliph's daughter, along her three slaves: a flute player, a fortune-teller, and a Mongol slave. The princess's Mongol slave alerts the guards, but he gets away.

When his associate reminds the disconsolate Ahmed that a bygone thief once stole another princess during the reign of Haroun al-Rashid, Ahmed sets out to do the same. The next day is the princess's birthday. Three princes arrive, seeking her hand in marriage (and the future inheritance of the city)": Prince of Indies, Prince of Persia, and Prince of Mongol. The princess's fortune-teller slave foretells that she will marry the man who first touches a rose-tree in her garden. The princess watches anxiously as first the glowering Prince of the Indies, then the obese Prince of Persia and finally the Prince of the Mongols pass by the rose-tree. The sight of the Mongol fills the princess with fear, but when Ahmed appears (disguised in stolen garments as a suitor), she is delighted. The Mongol slave tells her countryman of the prophecy, but before he can touch the rose-tree, Ahmed's startled horse tosses its rider into it.

That night, the princess chooses Ahmed for her husband. Out of love, Ahmed gives up his plan to abduct her and confesses all to her in private. The Mongol prince learns from his spy, the princess's Mongol slave, that Ahmed is a common thief and informs the caliph. Ahmed is lashed mercilessly, and the caliph orders he be torn apart by a giant ape, but the princess has the guards bribed to let him go.

When the caliph insists she select another husband, her loyal slave advises her to delay. She asks that the princes each bring her a gift after "seven moons"; she will marry the one who brings her the rarest. In despair, Ahmed turns to the holy man. He tells the thief to become a prince, revealing to him the peril-fraught path to a great treasure.

The Prince of the Indies obtains a magic crystal ball from the eye of a giant idol, which shows whatever he wants to see, while the Persian prince buys a flying carpet. The Mongol prince leaves behind his henchman, telling him to organize the soldiers he will send to Bagdad disguised as porters. (The potentate has sought all along to take the city; the beautiful princess is only an added incentive.) After he obtains a magic golden apple which has the power to cure anything, even death, he sends word to the Mongol slave to poison the princess. After many adventures, Ahmed gains a cloak of invisibility and a small chest of magic powder which turns into whatever he wishes when he sprinkles it. He races back to the city.

The three princes meet as agreed at a caravanserai before returning to Bagdad. The Mongol asks the Indian to check whether the princess has waited for them. They discover that she is near death, and ride the flying carpet to reach her. Then the Mongol uses the apple to cure her. The suitors argue over which gift is rarest, but the princess points out that without any one gift, the remaining two would have been useless in saving her. Her loyal slave shows her Ahmed in the crystal ball, so the princess convinces her father to deliberate carefully on his future son-in-law. The Mongol prince chooses not to wait, unleashing his secret army that night and capturing Bagdad.

Ahmed arrives at the city gate, shut and defended by Mongols. When he conjures up a large army with his powder, the Mongol soldiers flee. The Mongol prince is about to have one of his soldiers kill him when the Mongol slave suggests he escape with the princess on the flying carpet. Ahmed liberates the city and rescues the princess, using his cloak of invisibility to get through the Mongols guards and capturing their prince. In gratitude, the caliph gives his daughter to him in marriage.

== Cast ==
- Douglas Fairbanks as Ahmed, the Thief of Bagdad
- Snitz Edwards as His Evil Associate
- Charles Belcher as The Holy Man (Imam) / Narrator
- Julanne Johnston as The Princess. Johnston had appeared the previous year in another Arabian Nights fantasy, the now lost The Brass Bottle, directed by Maurice Tourneur
- Sojin Kamiyama as Cham Shang, Prince of the Mongols
- Anna May Wong as The Mongol Slave
- Brandon Hurst as The Caliph
- Tote Du Crow as The Soothsayer
- Noble Johnson as The Prince of the Indies
- Mathilde Comont as The Prince of Persia (uncredited)
- Sam Baker as The Sworder
- Sadakichi Hartmann as The Court Magician (uncredited)
- Laska Winter as Slave of the Lute (uncredited)

The blues musician Jesse Fuller also had a small part.

== Production ==
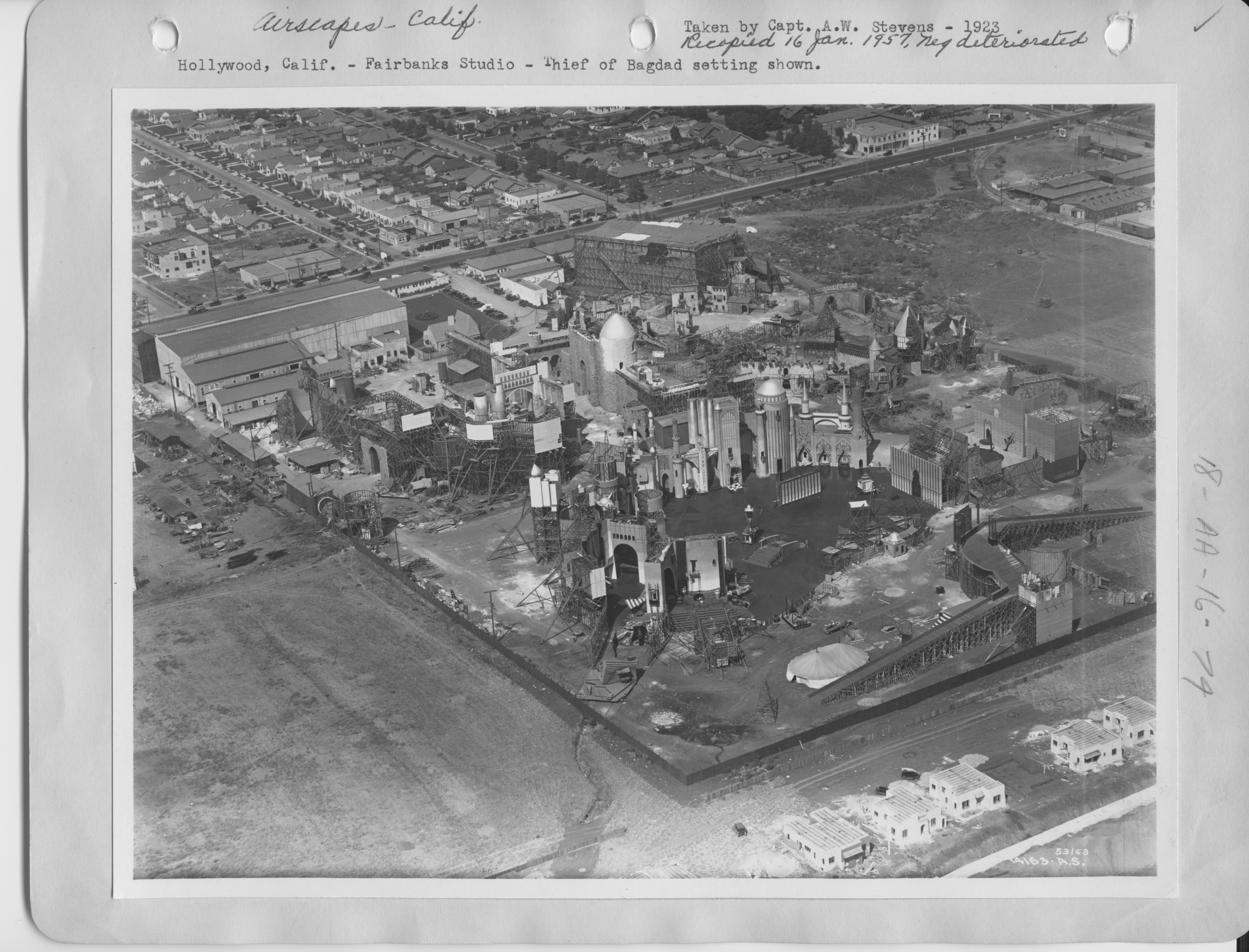
Aerial photo of the set

Fairbanks sought to make an epic. Lavishly staged on a Hollywood studio set, at a reputed cost of $1,135,654.65, The Thief of Bagdad was one of the most expensive films of the 1920s. Art director William Cameron Menzies was largely responsible for the production design, closely following the requirements laid down by Fairbanks, who acted as writer, producer and star. Fairbanks' meticulous attention to detail, as well as complex visual imagery, required the use of state-of-the-art special effects, featuring a magic rope, a flying horse, a flying carpet and full-scale palace sets.

== Music ==
Douglas Fairbanks encouraged the respected composer Mortimer Wilson to provide a fully-fledged classical score. Wilson composed leit-motifs for each character and developed them symphonically. He also spent many hours in the editing room working on combining his music with the film. The score has been re-constructed by Mark Fitz-Gerald and recorded. A 1924 Literary Digest article details Wilson's work on the film (and includes a photo of the composer). Wilson also wrote the music for Fairbanks's next two films, Don Q, Son of Zorro (1925) and The Black Pirate (1926).

== Reception ==
Glenn Erickson praised the film, writing:

Every age has its wonder entertainments, and 1924's The Thief of Bagdad transported audiences to a new level of imaginative fantasy. It had the biggest star of the era in a production that dwarfed anything anyone had ever seen ... It has sets bigger than those in Intolerance and costumed crowd scenes to rival the enormous Italian spectacles of the day. What's more, the picture is packed with elaborate special effects, many of which still have the power to impress. ... Some critics prefer Douglas Fairbanks' earlier modern-day adventures to his twenties' costume epics, but this dazzler still takes people's heads off. Simply put, the production's overall design and execution -- sets, costumes, lighting, special effects -- are coordinated so tightly that the illusion of grandeur is complete.

Darragh O'Donoghue is of the opinion that:

"The first reel provides some of the purest joy the silent cinema can offer. ... Where initially there had been a satisfying equivalence between the discrete adventures of Ahmed as a psychologically plausible thief in medieval Mesopotamia and Ahmed as a universal Everyman figure, in the film's latter two-thirds, the former distinctive superstructure gives way to a kind of Pilgrim’s Progress in Orientalist drag. ... Adventure sequences are staged like fairground tableaux and have none of the interest in physical process or emotional investment that made the early reels so exciting. ... After promising a dream, this great but flawed film eventually sends its audience to sleep.

== Honors ==
In June 2008, the American Film Institute revealed its 10 Top 10, the 10 best films in 10 "classic" American film genres. After polling over 1,500 people from the creative community, The Thief of Bagdad was acknowledged as the ninth best film in the fantasy genre.

== Preservation status ==
The George Eastman Museum has a 16mm triacetate positive print.

== Remakes ==
The 1940 film of the same name made the title character, played by Sabu, a sidekick for a handsome prince rather than the leading man. Indian actor M. G. Ramachandran assumed the role of Ali, the thief of Baghdad in the 1960 film Baghdad Thirudan. The 1924 film was directly remade in Europe in 1961 as Il Ladro di Bagdad, with Steve Reeves in the lead, while a 1978 film combined plot elements of these with others from the Sabu version.

A number of Indian films, were made under the titles of: Baghdad Ka Chor (The Thief of Baghdad) in 1934, 1946, 1955; Baghdad Gaja Donga (Thief of Baghdad) in 1968; and Thief of Baghdad in 1969 and 1977. A television series, Thief of Baghdad, was also made in India which aired on Zee TV between 2000 and 2001.

== Home media ==
The Thief of Bagdad is in the public domain and many cheap, unrestored black-and-white copies have been issued on VHS and DVD. A restored version first appeared on US DVD in 1998, distributed by Image Entertainment. It featured original color tinting and a musical accompaniment arranged from the original 1924 music cue sheets and performed in 1975 by Gaylord Carter on a Wurlitzer theater pipe organ. Kino International reissued the DVD in 2004, this time with a longer, improved print and chamber ensemble score. The film has also been released on Blu-ray by the Cohen Film Collection (US) in 2013 and Eureka! Entertainment (UK) in 2014. That version features a Carl Davis orchestral score and an audio commentary by Fairbanks biographer Jeffrey Vance.

== See also ==
- Category:Silent films
- Category:Silent film actors
