= The Nut (film) =

1921 film by Theodore Reed

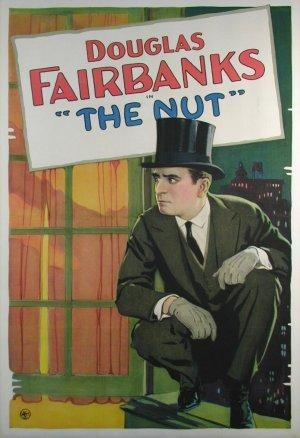
- Movie poster
- Directed by: Ted Reed
- Screenplay by: Douglas Fairbanks (uncredited); William Parker; Lotta Woods
- Based on: story by Kenneth Davenport
- Produced by: Douglas Fairbanks (uncredited)
- Starring: Douglas Fairbanks
- Cinematography: Harry Thorpe; William McGann; Charles Warrington
- Production company: Douglas Fairbanks Pictures Corporation
- Distributed by: United Artists Corporation
- Release date: March 6, 1921 (U.S.)
- Running time: 6 reels; 74 minutes (USA); 65 minutes (DVD)
- Country: United States
- Language: Silent (English intertitles)

The Nut

The Nut is a 1921 American silent film directed by Ted Reed for Douglas Fairbanks Pictures Corporation. It is structured as an action comedy vehicle for its producer, writer and star Douglas Fairbanks.

Fairbanks biographer Jeffrey Vance writes, "Admittedly a minor work, The Nut is frequently dismissed in critical assessments of Fairbanks's career. This is unfortunate, for it contains some fascinating sequences and reveals much about the actor-producer's state of mind at the time it was made." Vance also notes, "The picture is like a chaotic funhouse, filled with magical masquerades, illusions, and gimmicks of great momentary amusement."

== Opening intertitles ==
"Our theme is Love.
The unquenchable love
of a man for a maid."

"Our lover is an inven-
tor. He invents ways of
pleasing his girl and then
he invents ways of getting
out of the trouble caused
by his inventions."

"But—whatever he
does—it is all for"

"HER"

"Chapter I.
In which we introduce
our hero—"

== Plot ==
Charlie (Fairbanks) loves a woman, Estrell (De La Motte), who has a theory that if rich people would take a number of poor children into their homes each day, the environment would cause the children to grow up properly and become good citizens. Charlie organizes a party to convince rich people to participate to this cause, but the event ends up catastrophically. Charlie, who spends the night at the police station, meets a crook who pretend to be a member of the very influential Vanderbrook family. To regain Estrell’s favor, Charlie arranges a meeting with him and other false influential personalities, who are in reality burglars and gamblers. Realizing that he has been deceived, but in need to fulfill a promise he made, he arranges a false meeting between Estrell and dummies posing as real people. But Estrell is not fooled and becomes indignant. A real Vanderbrook working as a reporter goes to investigate a report of a man dragging a body which turns out to be Charlie moving a dummy, allowing Charlie to finally meet influential people. Meanwhile, Estrell is lured by a man who tries to abuse her. Charlie finds out and rescues her, and in the end, she is satisfied and agrees to marry him.

== Cast ==
(per on-screen credits)

- Marguerite De La Motte as Estrell Wynn
- William Lowery as Philip Feeney
- Gerald Pring as Gentleman George
- Morris Hughes as Pernelius Vanderbrook, Jr.
- Barbara La Marr as Claudine Dupree
- Sydney dé Grey
- Douglas Fairbanks as Charlie Jackson

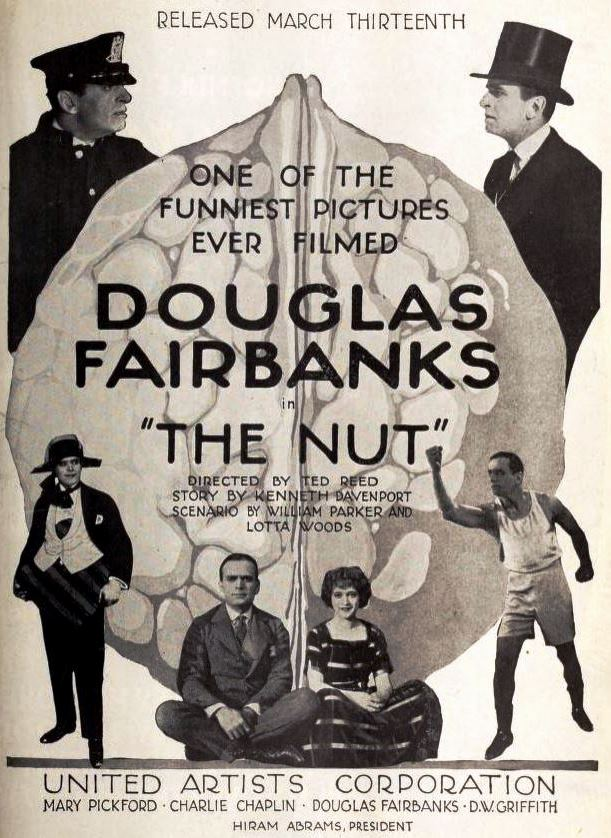
An advertisement in which Mary Pickford and Charlie Chaplin are credited

Frank Campeau, Jeanne Carpenter, Charlie Chaplin, Mary Pickford and Charles Stevens appear uncredited in the movie, although Pickford and Chaplin are mentioned in advertisements.

Fairbanks biographer Jeffrey Vance disputes the claims of many film historians that Charlie Chaplin appears in the film. "It is clearly a Chaplin imitator, not Chaplin himself, who appears briefly in the party sequence wearing the Tramp costume."
