= The Three Musketeers (1921 film) =

1921 film by Fred Niblo

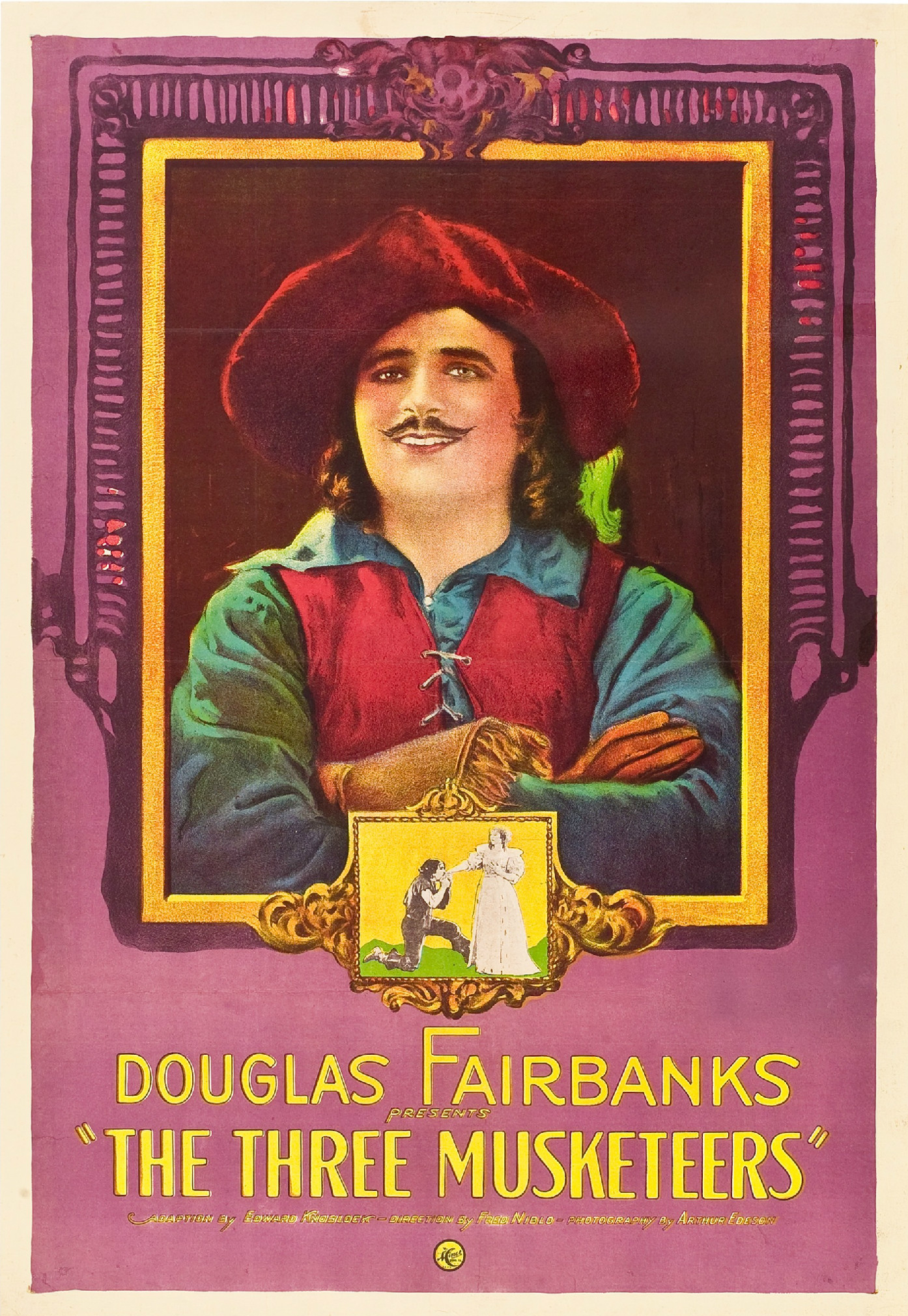
- Directed by: Fred Niblo
- Written by: Edward Knoblock (adaptation); Douglas Fairbanks; Lotta Woods (screenplay)
- Based on: The Three Musketeers; 1844 novel by Alexandre Dumas
- Produced by: Douglas Fairbanks
- Starring: Douglas Fairbanks; Leon Bary; George Siegmann; Eugene Pallette; Boyd Irwin; Marguerite De La Motte
- Cinematography: Arthur Edeson
- Edited by: Nellie Mason
- Music by: Louis F. Gottschalk
- Distributed by: United Artists
- Release date: August 28, 1921
- Running time: 120 minutes
- Country: United States
- Languages: Silent film English intertitles
- Box office: $1.5 million

The Three Musketeers is a 1921 American silent film based on the 1844 novel The Three Musketeers by Alexandre Dumas, père. It was directed by Fred Niblo and stars Douglas Fairbanks as d'Artagnan. The film originally had scenes filmed in the Handschiegl Color Process (billed as the "Wyckoff-DeMille Process"). The film had a sequel, The Iron Mask (1929), also starring Fairbanks as d'Artagnan and DeBrulier as Cardinal Richelieu.

== Plot summary ==
The Three Musketeers (1921)

In the royal court of France, Cardinal Richelieu vies for influence over King Louis XIII. The greatest obstacle to his dominance is Anne of Austria, the Queen of France. Anne is loved by the Duke of Buckingham, an Englishman, although she remains faithful to Louis. Louis gives her a diamond encrusted brooch.

In Gascony, d'Artagnan leaves his home to seek his fortune. He travels to Paris, where he meets the Three Musketeers. The Three Musketeers and d'Artagnan cause trouble around Paris and frequently fight with Cardinal Richelieu's guardsmen. d'Artagnan falls in love with Constance, the Queen's seamstress.

Cardinal Richelieu forges a letter from Anne to the Duke of Buckingham inviting him to Paris. The Duke arrives, but Anne gently rebuffs him. He requests something to remember her by. Anne gives the Duke her diamond brooch and he returns to England. Richelieu manipulates the King into asking Anne to wear the brooch at an upcoming ball.

Knowing the Queen will be dishonored if the brooch is discovered missing, Constance asks d'Artagnan to retrieve the brooch from England. d'Artagnan and the Three Musketeers depart for England. Richelieu discovers d'Artagnan's mission and sends his agents to stop him. One by one the Three Musketeers stay behind to prevent d'Artagnan from falling into the Cardinal's traps. d'Artagnan sails to England and retrieves the brooch. He arrives back in Paris to deliver the brooch to Queen Anne. d'Artagnan, Constance, and the Three Musketeers are reunited. d'Artagnan is made a member of the King's Musketeers.

== Cast ==
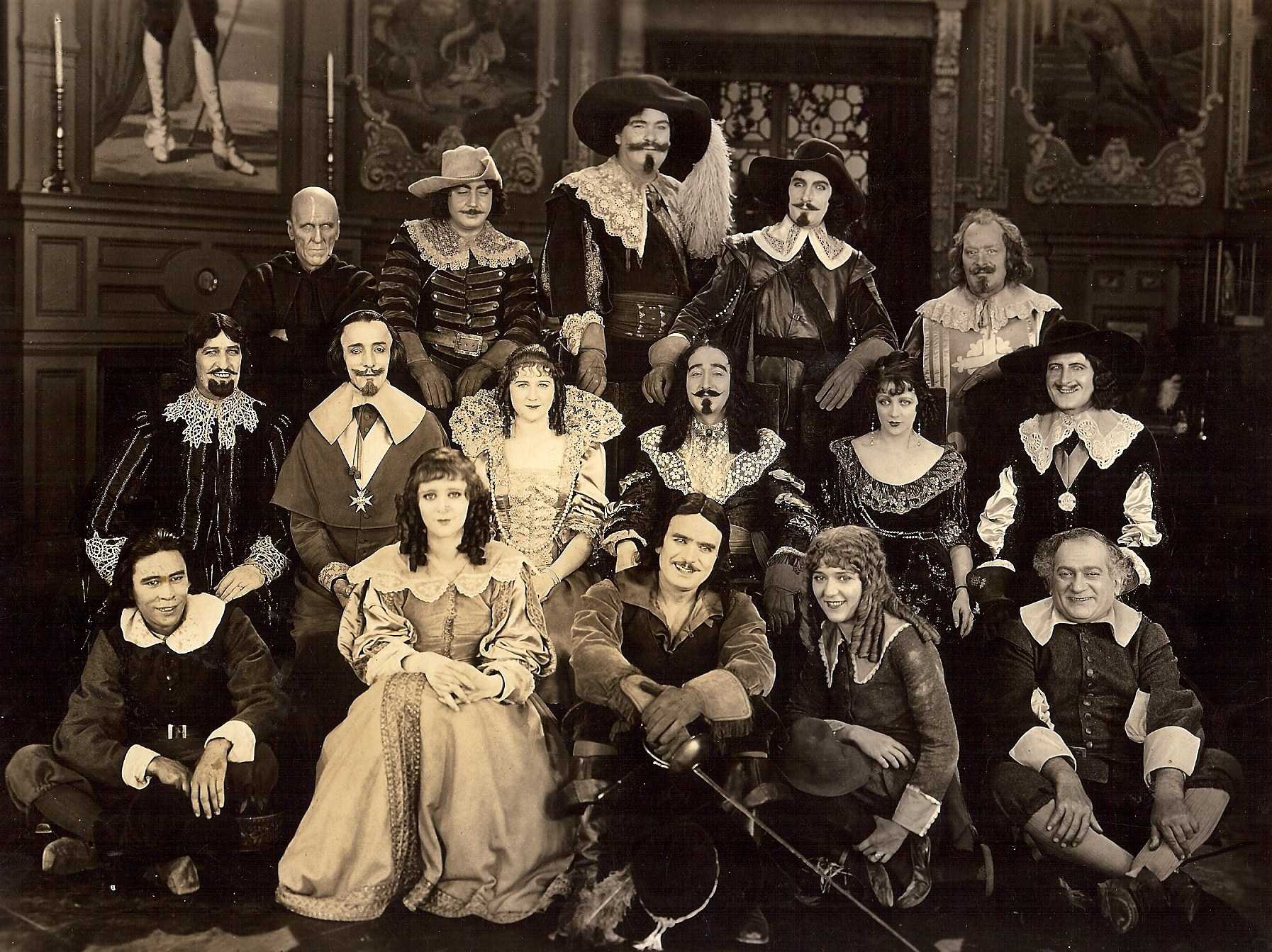
Front row: Charles Stevens, Marguerite De La Motte, Douglas Fairbanks, Mary Pickford (guest), Sidney Franklin. Second row: Boyd Irwin, Nigel De Brulier, Mary MacLaren, Adolphe Menjou, Barbara La Marr, Thomas Holding. Back row: Lon Poff, Eugene Pallette, George Siegmann, Léon Bary, Willis Robards.

In opening credits order:

- Adolphe Menjou as Louis XIII
- Mary MacLaren as Anne of Austria
- Nigel De Brulier as Cardinal Richelieu
- Thomas Holding as Duke of Buckingham
- Marguerite De La Motte as Constance Bonacieux
- Willis Robards as Captain de Treville
- Boyd Irwin as Comte de Rochefort
- Barbara La Marr as Milady de Winter
- Lon Poff as Father Joseph
- Walt Whitman as d'Artagnan's Father
- Sidney Franklin as Bonacieux
- Charles Belcher as Bernajoux
- Charles Stevens as Planchet
- Léon Bary as Athos
- George Siegmann as Porthos
- Eugene Pallette as Aramis
- Douglas Fairbanks as d'Artagnan

== Production ==
The athletic Douglas Fairbanks was known for performing his own stunts. His left-handed handspring balanced on a short dagger during one of the fight scenes is the most well-known from the picture, and is generally considered the most difficult of his career. Fairbanks biographer Jeffrey Vance enthuses, "The Three Musketeers was the first of the grand Fairbanks costume films, filled with exemplary production values and ornamentation. Indeed, one ornament extended beyond the film: Fairbanks wore d'Artagnan's moustache—cultivated for The Three Musketeers—to the end of his life. With The Three Musketeers, he at last found his metier and crystallized his celebrity and his cinema."

== Preservation status ==
In April 1939, Fairbanks donated his entire film collection to the Museum of Modern Art (MoMA), including both a 35mm nitrate negative and a tinted positive print. The negative was duplicated in 1963, and this print was used for the restoration completed in May 2017 by MoMA, the San Francisco Silent Film Festival, and Film Preservation Society. MoMA and Image Protection Services also finished a color restoration in February 2021.

== See also ==
- List of early color feature films
