= The Devil's Gulch =

1926 film

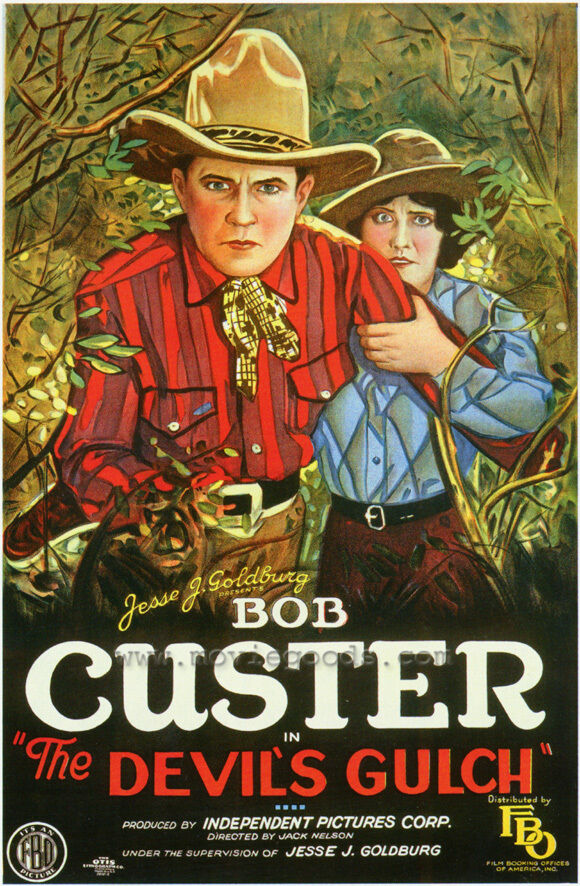
- Directed by: Jack Nelson
- Written by: Barr Cross; Arthur Preston Hankins
- Produced by: Joseph P. Kennedy
- Starring: Bob Custer; Hazel Deane; Charles Belcher
- Production company: Robertson-Cole Pictures Corporation
- Distributed by: Film Booking Offices of America
- Release date: August 8, 1926
- Running time: 5 reels
- Country: United States
- Language: Silent (English intertitles)

The Devil's Gulch is a 1926 American silent Western film directed by Jack Nelson. The film stars Bob Custer, and Hazel Deane.

== Plot ==
The guard at the Gold Coin Mine is found dead. A message nearby indicating that “Twin Hand,” a notorious bandit, murdered and robbed him. His twin brother vows revenge. No one has seen Twin Hand, but it is known that he has to use both hands together, due to a defect in his nervous system. A clue leads the brother to a town where he meets and falls in love with a girl. He also meets a local politician who aspires to the girl’s hand. The brother suspects him as he never uses his hands. The latter plans to have the brother shot. After several exciting incidents the killer is caught and made to confess, and the brother declares his love and is accepted.

== Cast ==
- Bob Custer as Ace and Deuce Remsen
- Hazel Deane as Merrill Waverly
- Charles Belcher as Max Crew
- Pat Beggs as Bill Griggs
- Roy Laidlaw as Seth Waverly
- Mark Hamilton as the Sheriff

== Preservation ==
With no holdings located in archives, The Devil's Gulch is considered a lost film.
