= A Modern Musketeer =

1917 film by Allan Dwan

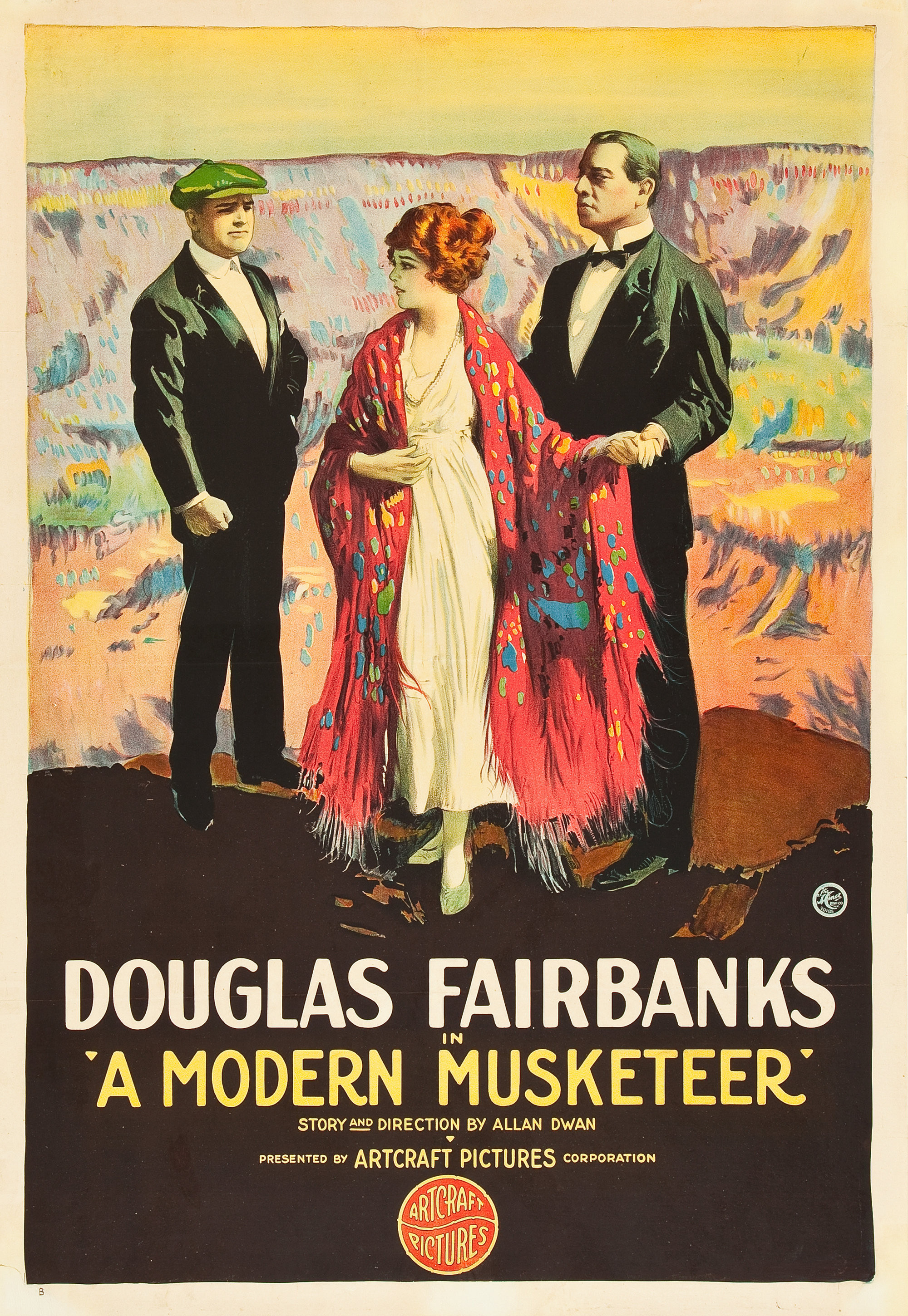
- Theatrical release poster
- Directed by: Allan Dwan
- Written by: Allan Dwan (scenario)
- Based on: "D'Artagnan of Kansas" by Eugene P. Lyle, Jr
- Produced by: Douglas Fairbanks
- Starring: Douglas Fairbanks
- Cinematography: Hugh McClung; Harry Thorpe; Victor Fleming
- Edited by: Billy Shea; Allan Dwan (supervising editor)
- Distributed by: Artcraft Pictures
- Release date: December 30, 1917
- Running time: 68 minutes (2006 alternate version)
- Country: United States
- Language: Silent (English intertitles)

A Modern Musketeer (1917)

A Modern Musketeer is a 1917 American silent adventure comedy film directed and written by Allan Dwan. Based on the short story, "D'Artagnan of Kansas" by Eugene P. Lyle Jr., which appeared in Everybody's Magazine, September 1912, the film was produced by and stars Douglas Fairbanks. A now complete and restored print of the film still exists and is currently in the public domain.

== Plot ==
D'Artagnan rides up to a tavern on horseback and ends up brawling with sword and fist with the patrons inside in his haste to approach a fair young stranger. After triumphing, he morphs into modern day Ned Thacker.

Ned is born and raised in Kansas by a mother who passes along to him her love of D'Artagnan and The Three Musketeers, despite his father's concern that it is not good for him. In fact, Ned does get into trouble with his (sometimes unwanted) chivalrous attempts to help women. Finally, Ned can stand it no more; he decides to leave dull Kansas. In mirroring scenes, D'Artagnan is astride a somewhat less-than-noble steed, a present from his father for his departure from home, while Ned's father gives him the modern equivalent: a car.

While driving in the desert, he comes upon a chauffeur-driven automobile stopped because the road ahead has been washed away. Unimpressed with one passenger, the middle-aged Forrest Vandeteer (the "richest man in Yonkers"), Ned is quite taken with the lovely "Park Avenue flapper" Elsie Dodge. Her mother, the third passenger, sees her only daughter's marriage to Vandeteer as the solution to their dire financial straits. Vandeteer buys what he wants, and he wants Elsie. She, however, loathes her suitor; she much prefers young Ned.

Lobby card

Ned comes up with the idea to put his car on railroad tracks. He takes the party (with Elsie in the front seat beside him) to their Grand Canyon resort hotel. There, Vandeteer tells Ned to stay away from the ladies. John Blabb, who works for "Town Topics", informs Ned that Vandeteer already has three wives hidden away somewhere.

Meanwhile, Chin-de-dah, the Native American leader of an outlaw gang hiding in a tributary canyon, is bored. He decides to kidnap a white woman to be his wife (his last "wife" is shown to have committed suicide). He goes to the resort, pretending to be a guide, and selects Elsie as his target. Ned is suspicious, but Vandeteer hires him. Vandeteer and Elsie set out for a horse ride down the canyon with their guide. Ned uses the time to persuade Mrs. Dodge that her daughter's happiness should take priority over their financial security.

James Brown, a member of the gang who knows and hates Vandeteer, gleefully tells Ned about the man's impending demise and Chin-de-dah's intentions toward Elsie. Ned shames him into helping with a rescue. They reach the camp in time to free Elsie and Vandeteer, but remain in peril. Vandeteer offers Ned $100,000 to save his life; Ned makes him put it in writing. Then they are lifted up the sheer cliff by a rope pulled by a horse. Once they are safe, Brown wants to kill Vandeteer, who falsely incriminated him in Vandeteer's own scam and stole his wife and children. Vandeteer ends up clinging to the cliffside, kept from falling to his death only by Ned's grip. Under Ned's direction, he writes a note exonerating Brown. Ned persuades Brown to let Vandeteer live, and promises to split the reward with him. Once they are alone, Elsie kisses her rescuer.

== Cast ==
- Douglas Fairbanks as Ned Thacker/D'Artagnan
- Marjorie Daw as Elsie Dodge
- Kathleen Kirkham as Mrs. Dodge
- Eugene Ormonde as Forrest Vandeteer
- Edythe Chapman as Mrs. Thacker
- Frank Campeau as Chin-de-dah
- Tully Marshall as James Brown
- Zasu Pitts as A Kansas City Belle (uncredited)
- Charles Stevens as Indian (uncredited)

== Production notes ==
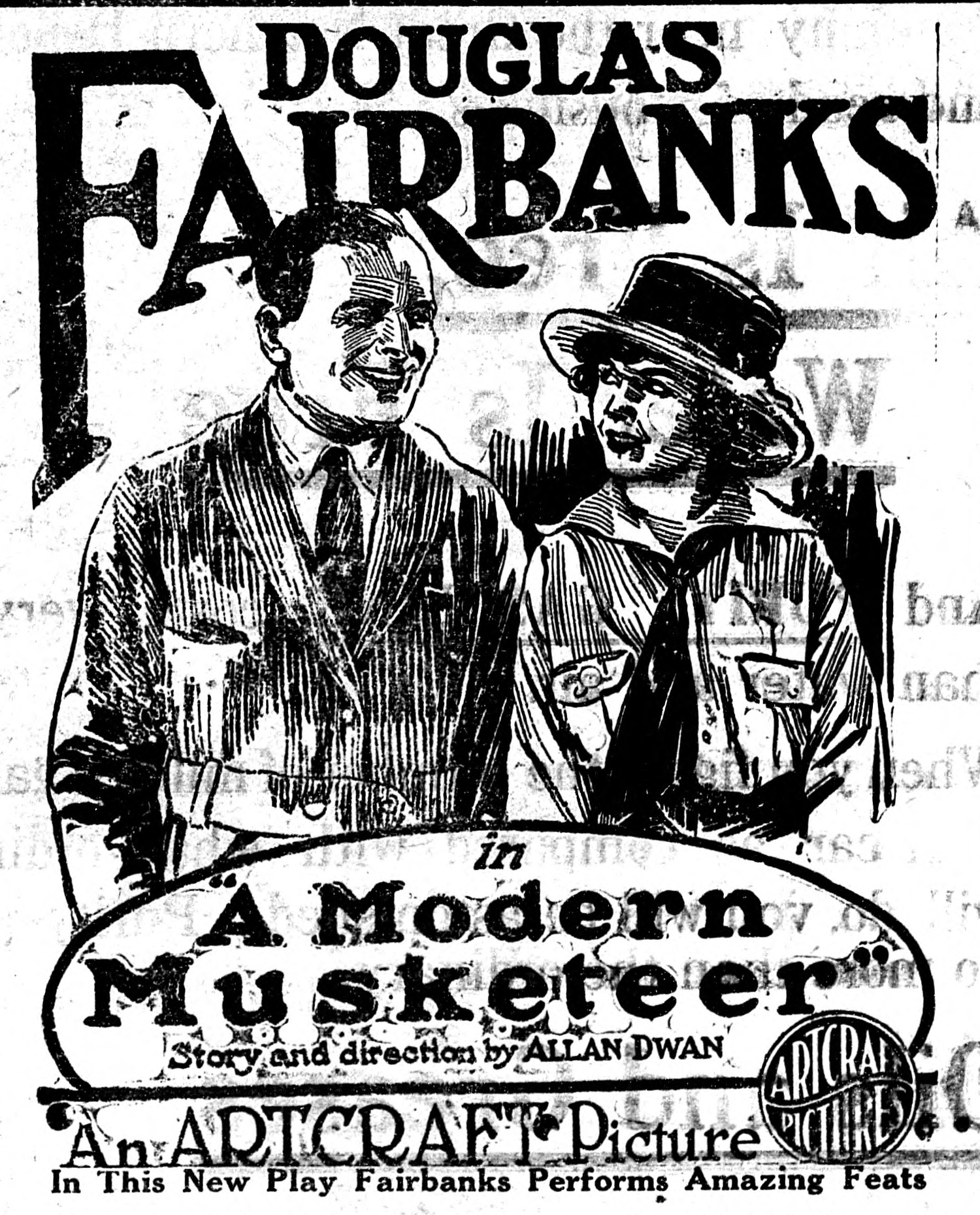
Newspaper advertisement

Filming began in the fall of 1917 at the Grand Canyon in Arizona. Additional scenes were shot at Canyon de Chelly near Chinle, Arizona and at the Jesse Lasky Studios in Los Angeles.

== Reception ==
Like many American films of the time, A Modern Musketeer was subject to cuts by city and state film censorship boards. The Chicago Board of Censors required a cut of the two intertitles "The boss has gone for another woman" and "Remember the last woman", three scenes of a young woman in a cave including and following her suicide, and the shooting scene where a man falls.

== Preservation and restoration ==
The majority of A Modern Musketeer was long presumed lost as only a partial 35mm print of the film that Douglas Fairbanks donated to the Museum of Modern Art was known to exist. The missing footage was later discovered by the Danish Film Institute. The DFI and the Museum of Modern Art restored the film with the newly discovered footage and the preserved print.

== Home media ==
The restored version of A Modern Musketeer was released on Region 0 DVD as part of the Flicker Alley collection, Douglas Fairbanks: A Modern Musketeer, on December 2, 2008.

The DVD version contains an audio commentary track by film historians Jeffrey Vance and Tony Maietta.
