= The Gaucho =

1927 film by F. Richard Jones

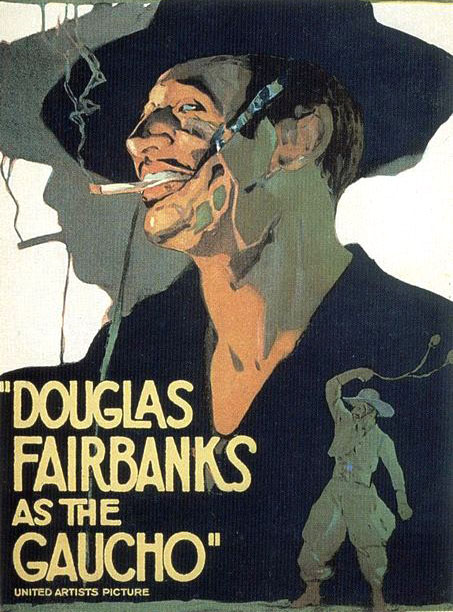
- Theatrical release poster
- Directed by: F. Richard Jones
- Written by: Douglas Fairbanks
- Produced by: Douglas Fairbanks
- Starring: Douglas Fairbanks; Lupe Vélez
- Cinematography: Tony Gaudio
- Edited by: William Nolan
- Music by: Arthur Kay (uncredited)
- Production company: The Elton Corporation
- Distributed by: United Artists
- Release date: November 21, 1927
- Running time: 115 minutes
- Language: Silent (English intertitles)
- Box office: $1.4 million

The Gaucho (1927)

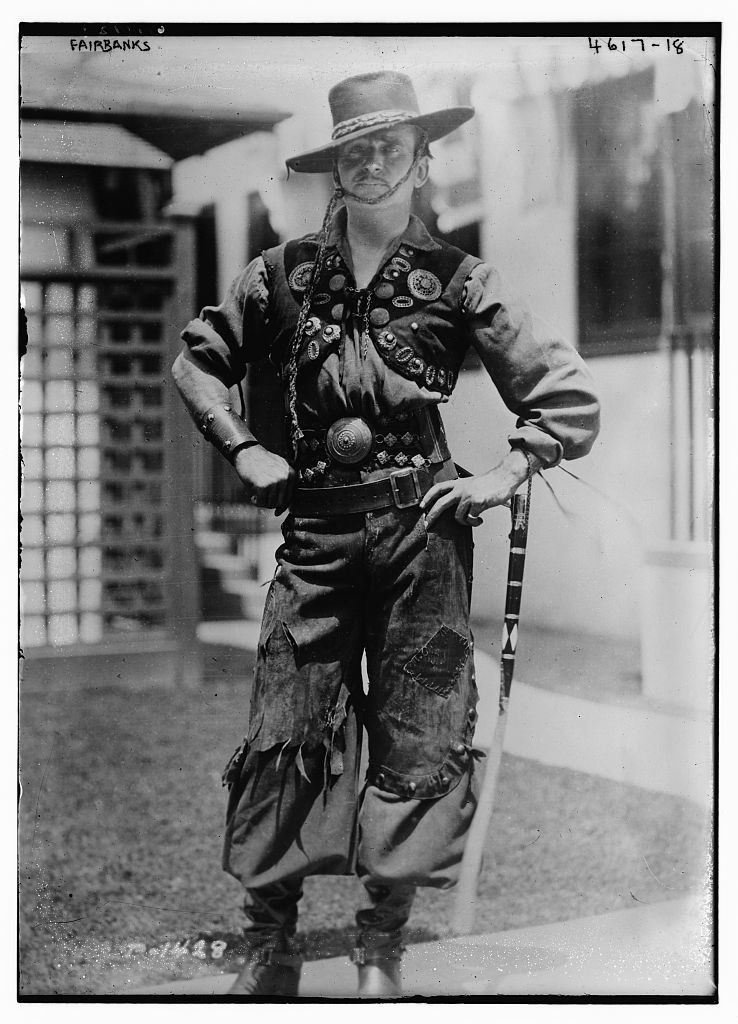
Douglas Fairbanks in The Gaucho in 1927

The Gaucho (the official full title of the film is Douglas Fairbanks as The Gaucho) is a 1927 American silent adventure film starring Douglas Fairbanks and Lupe Vélez that is set in Argentina. The lavish adventure extravaganza, filmed at the height of Fairbanks' box office clout, was directed by F. Richard Jones with a running time of 115 minutes.

Fairbanks biographer Jeffrey Vance considers the film "a near masterwork" and "an anomaly among his [Fairbanks'] works." Vance also considers it a "daring departure, the film is an effort of unanticipated darkness in tone, setting, and character. The spirit of adolescent boyish adventure, the omnipresent characteristic of his prior films, is noticeably absent. It has been replaced by a spiritual fervor and an element of seething sexuality the likes of which has never been seen before in one of his productions."

== Plot ==
The disreputable leader of a group of bandits, El Gaucho, is thrust into the role of hero after an even more cruel local strongman, Ruiz, takes over the Andean village that El Gaucho and his men have used as their base. But after regaining the town for his selfish uses, El Gaucho has a showdown with the Padre and undergoes a spiritual transformation when confronted with the holy powers of a sacred shrine.

== Cast ==
- Douglas Fairbanks as the Gaucho
- Lupe Vélez as the mountain girl
- Joan Barclay (as Geraine Greear) as the girl of the shrine (younger)
- Eve Southern as the girl of the shrine
- Gustav von Seyffertitz as Ruiz, the usurper
- Charles Stevens as the Gaucho's first lieutenant
- Nigel De Brulier as the Padre
- Albert MacQuarrie as victim of the Black Doom
- Mary Pickford as Virgin Mary (cameo)

== Production ==
For the scene where Mary Pickford appears as the Virgin Mary, there was footage shot with Technicolor process no. 2, but it was ultimately decided to not include them in the final film.

== Legacy ==
A new preservation print of The Gaucho, created by the Museum of Modern Art, was first shown at the Academy of Motion Picture Arts and Sciences in 2008. It has subsequently been screened at MoMA (2008), and the San Francisco Silent Film Festival (2009) to promote the new book Douglas Fairbanks with author Jeffrey Vance introducing the screenings.

The nickname for the sports teams of the University of California-Santa Barbara is The Gauchos in honor of Fairbanks' acting in the eponymous film.
