= Charles Belcher (actor) =

American actor

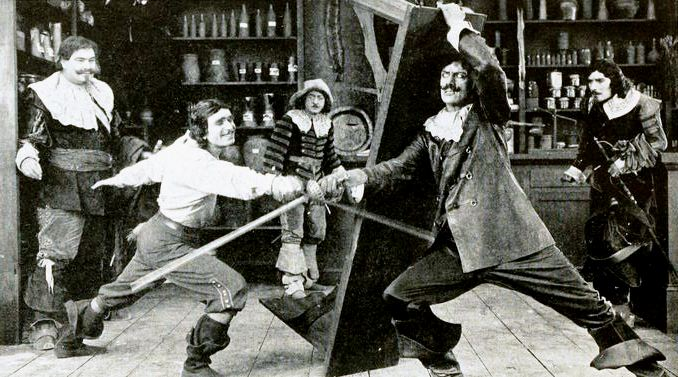
- Douglas Fairbanks fighting Charles Belcher in The Three Musketeers (1921)
- Born: July 27, 1872; San Francisco, California, U.S.
- Died: December 10, 1943 (aged 71); Woodland Hills, Los Angeles, California, U.S.
- Occupation: film actor
- Years active: 1919–1928

Charles Belcher (July 27, 1872 – December 10, 1943) was an American film actor. He appeared in 17 films between years 1919 and 1928.

He was born in San Francisco and died in Woodland Hills, Los Angeles.

== Partial filmography ==
- The Adventures of Ruth (1919)
- The Mark of Zorro (1920) - Minor Role (uncredited)
- The Three Musketeers (1921) - Bernajoux
- The Woman He Married (1922) - Richard Steel
- Rose o' the Sea (1922) - George Thornton
- Blood and Sand (1922) - Don Joselito
- Rosita (1923) - The Prime Minister
- The Thief of Bagdad (1924) - The Holy Man
- Fools in the Dark (1924) - Dr. Rand
- Away in the Lead (1925)
- Never Too Late (1925) - Arthur Greystone
- Ben-Hur: A Tale of the Christ (1925) - Balthazar
- The Black Pirate (1926) - Chief Passenger - Nobleman
- Midnight Faces (1926) - Samuel Lund
- Modern Youth (1926)
- The Devil's Gulch (1926) - Max Crew
- The King of Kings (1927) - Philip
- A Thief in the Dark (1928) - Duke (final film role)
