= Mortimer Wilson =

American classical composer (1875–1932)

Mortimer Wilson (August 6, 1876 – January 27, 1932) was an American composer of classical music. He also scored several musical and dramatic films in the 1920s.

Wilson was born in Chariton, Iowa in Lucas County, a rural area in the south-central portion of the state. He studied organ, violin and composition with Frederick Grant Gleason at the Chicago Music College. He then studied in Leipzig, Germany with Max Reger. Upon return to the USA in 1911 he taught composition at the Atlanta Conservatory and conducted the Atlanta Philharmonic Orchestra. In 1916, he moved to Brenau College in Gainesville, Georgia. In 1918, Wilson took a job as consulting editor for the National Academy of Music in New York City, where he remained until his death at the age of 55.

As a composer, Mortimer's European influenced late romantic style was similar to his contemporaries Henry Kimball Hadley and Frederick Shepherd Converse. Today his works are mostly in manuscript. They include five symphonies and a great deal of chamber music, including three violin sonatas, two piano trios, two piano sonatas and an organ sonata. The suite for piano trio From My Youth Op. 5 was published in 1911 (in two books of four pieces each) and premiered by the Sitting Trio. It has been recorded by the Rawlins Piano Trio. The short piano suite Silhouettes from the Screen, Op. 55 (1919) includes miniature musical portraits of William S. Hart, Charles Chaplin, Mary Pickford, Theda Bara (who is portrayed in an atonal, expressionistic style) and Douglas Fairbanks).

For the 1924 film The Thief of Bagdad. Douglas Fairbanks encouraged Wilson to provide a fully-fledged classical score, unusual at the time. Wilson composed leit-motifs for each character and developed them symphonically. He also spent many hours in the editing room working on combining his music with the film. The score has been re-constructed by Mark Fitz-Gerald and recorded. A 1924 Literary Digest article details Wilson's work on the film (and includes a photo of the composer). Wilson also wrote the music for Fairbanks’s next two films, Don Q, Son of Zorro (1925) and The Black Pirate (1926).

Mortimer was also the author of three books: The Rhetoric of Music (1907), Harmonic and Melodic Technical Studies (1908) and Orchestral Training (1921). His students included Robert Emmett Dolan, Joseph Littau and John Tasker Howard. He died aged 55 after a bout of influenza.

== Filmography ==
- 1920 The Mark of Zorro - music composer
- 1924 The Thief of Bagdad - music composer
- 1925 Don Q, Son of Zorro - music composer
- 1926 The Black Pirate - music composer
- 1928 The Good-Bye Kiss - music composer
- 1928 Night Watch - music composer
