= The Iron Mask =

1929 film by Allan Dwan

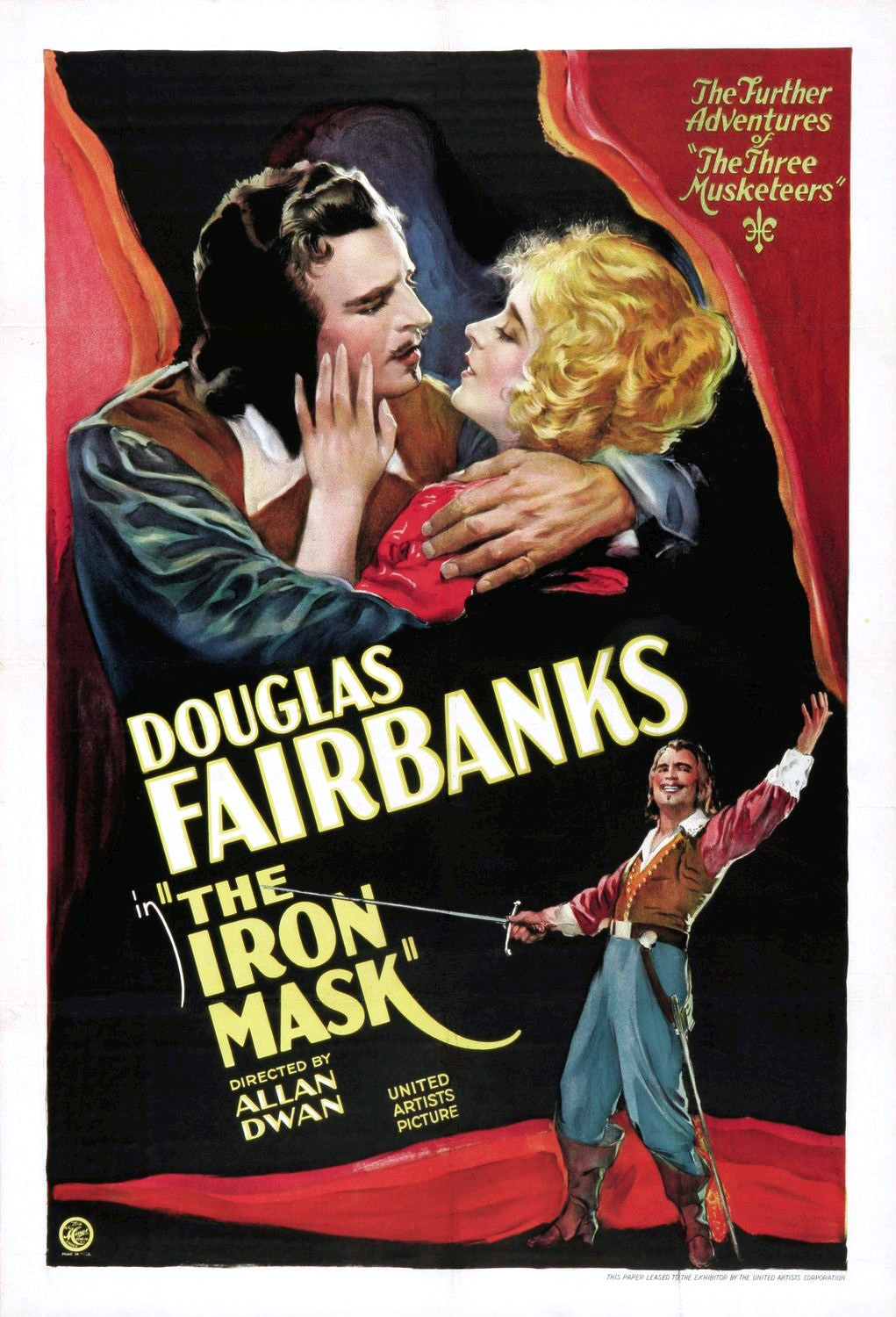
- Directed by: Allan Dwan
- Written by: Douglas Fairbanks; Jack Cunningham
- Based on: The Vicomte of Bragelonne: Ten Years Later; 1848–50 novels by Alexandre Dumas
- Produced by: Douglas Fairbanks
- Starring: Douglas Fairbanks; Belle Bennett; Marguerite De La Motte; Dorothy Revier; Vera Lewis; Rolfe Sedan; William Bakewell
- Cinematography: Henry Sharp
- Edited by: William Nolan
- Music by: Hugo Riesenfeld
- Production company: The Elton Corporation
- Distributed by: United Artists
- Release date: February 21, 1929
- Running time: 95 minutes
- Country: United States
- Languages: Part-Talkie; English intertitles
- Box office: $1.5 million

The Iron Mask (full film)

The Iron Mask is a 1929 American part-talkie adventure film directed by Allan Dwan. In addition to some sequences with dialogue, the film featured a synchronized musical score with sound effects and a theme song.

The film is an adaptation of the last section of the 1847-1850 novel The Vicomte de Bragelonne by Alexandre Dumas, père, which is itself based on the French legend of the Man in the Iron Mask.

== Plot ==
The film stars Fairbanks as d'Artagnan, Marguerite De La Motte as his beloved Constance (who is killed early in the film to protect the secret that the King has a twin brother), Nigel De Brulier as the scheming Cardinal Richelieu, and Ullrich Haupt as the evil Count De Rochefort. William Bakewell appeared as the royal twins.

== Cast ==
- Douglas Fairbanks – D'Artagnan
- Belle Bennett – The Queen Mother
- Marguerite De La Motte – Constance Bonacieux
- Dorothy Revier – Milady de Winter
- Vera Lewis – Madame Peronne
- Rolfe Sedan – Louis XIII
- William Bakewell – Louis XIV/Twin Brother
- Gordon Thorpe – Young Prince/Twin Brother
- Nigel De Brulier – Cardinal Richelieu
- Ullrich Haupt – Count De Rochefort
- Lon Poff – Father Joseph: the Queen's Confessor
- Charles Stevens – Planchet: D'Artagnan's Servant
- Henry Otto – the King's Valet
- Leon Bary – Athos
- Tiny Sandford – Porthos (*Stanley J. Sandford)
- Gino Corrado – Aramis

== Music ==
The film featured a theme song entitled “One For All — All For One (Song Of The Musketeers)” which was composed by Jo Trent (words) and Hugo Riesenfeld and Louis Alter (music). The song is sung on the soundtrack and is played instrumentally several times throughout the film.

== Production background ==
Fairbanks lavished resources on his last silent film with the knowledge he was bidding farewell to his beloved genre. This marks the only time where Fairbanks's character dies at the end of the film, with the closing scene depicting the once-again youthful Musketeers all reunited in death, moving on (as the final title says) to find "greater adventure beyond".

The original 1929 release has only two short sequences of dialogue which consisted of speeches delivered by Fairbanks. The rest of the film features a musical score with a few sound effects and a theme song that is sung and played several times.

In 1952, the film was reissued, with the intertitles removed and a narration voiced by Douglas Fairbanks, Jr. added. The original film included a scene in which d'Artagnan tells the young King of an embarrassing adventure involving him and the three musketeers. The story is told in flashback but the 1952 version has it in chronological order with the scene with the King cut out.

In 1999, with the cooperation of the Library of Congress and the Museum of Modern Art, Kino Video released a DVD of the 1929 version. A complete set of Vitaphone disks exists for this picture. However, only a small portion of the original sound from these was synchronized with film footage, namely the two short sequences in which Douglas Fairbanks speaks. The rest of the soundtrack, which contained a Synchronized Score along with sound effects and a theme song was not used as this would make the DVD public domain. (The copyright has expired on the original 1929 sound version.) For this DVD reissue, therefore, a new score was commissioned from composer Carl Davis. The Kino disc also includes excerpts from the 1952 version, some outtakes from the original filming, and some textual background material from the program for the 1999 premiere showing of the reconstruction. A complete restoration of the original sound version has yet to be released.

== Reception and legacy ==
Fairbanks Biographer Jeffrey Vance has opined, "As a valedictory to the silent screen, The Iron Mask is unsurpassed. In one of his few departures from playing a young man—and with fewer characteristic stunts—Fairbanks conjures up his most multi-dimensional and moving screen portrayal in a film that is perhaps the supreme achievement of its genre."

== See also ==
- List of early sound feature films (1926–1929)
