= Lotta Woods =

American screenwriter

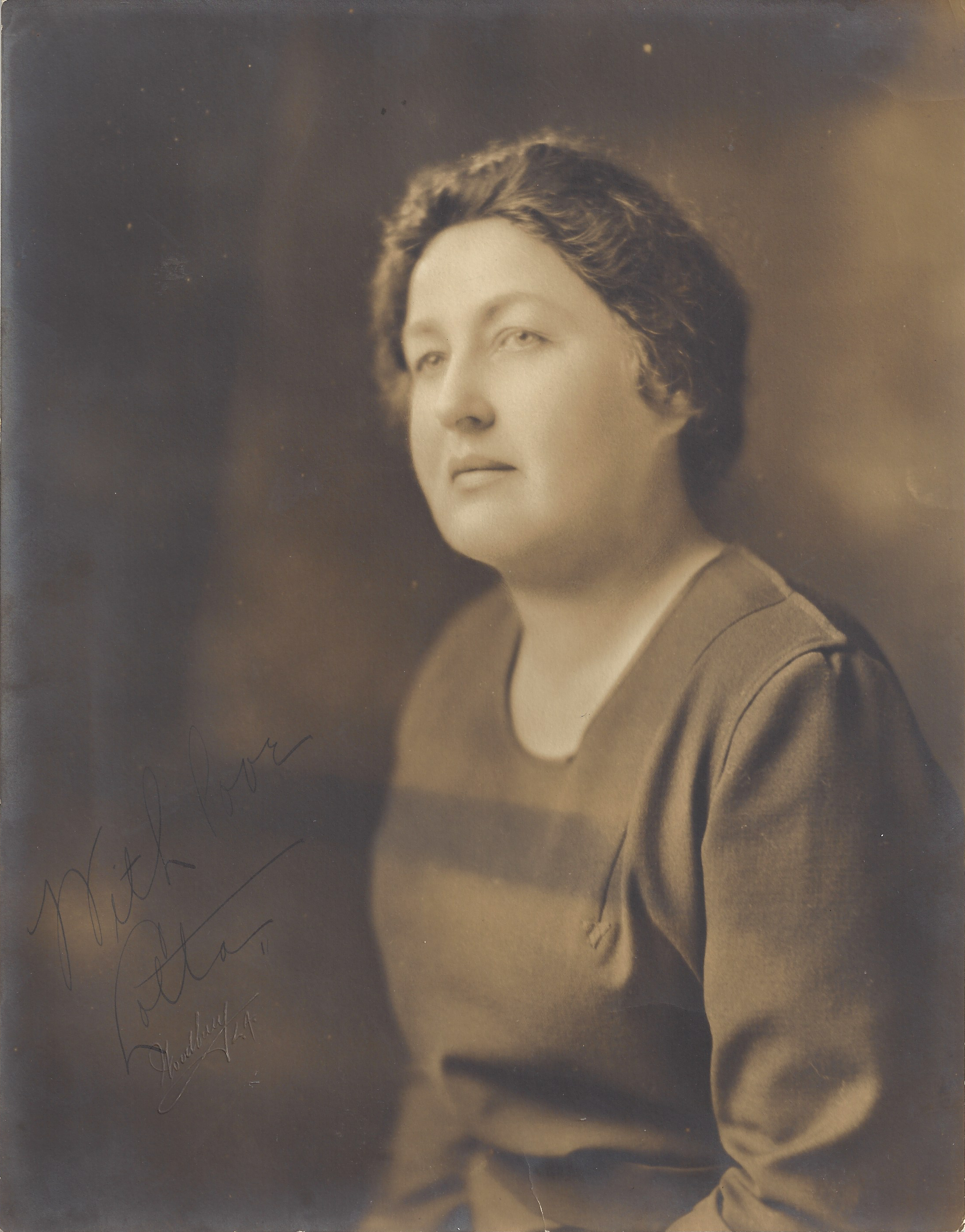
- Woods in 1920
- Born: Charlotte Nelson; April 18, 1869; Pennsylvania, US
- Died: September 8, 1957 (aged 88); Los Angeles County, California, US
- Occupation: Screenwriter
- Spouse: Arthur Woods
- Relatives: Frank E. Woods (brother-in-law)

Lotta Woods (born Charlotte Nelson), was an American screenwriter. She wrote 10 films between the years 1921 and 1929 for Douglas Fairbanks and MGM.

== Biography ==
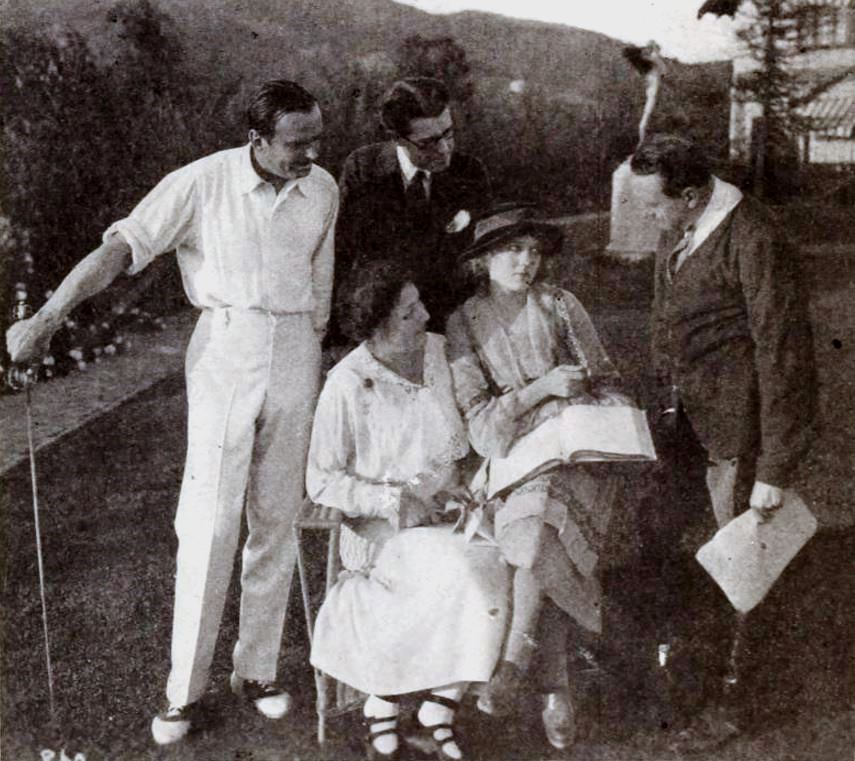
Script advisory committee for The Three Musketeers (1921) with Douglas Fairbanks, Kenneth Davenport, Lotta Woods, Mary Pickford, and Edward Knoblock

Lotta was born in Alleghany, Pennsylvania, to Normand Nelson and Orilla Akin.

She worked as a newspaper journalist before getting a job around 1919 as a reader for Fairbanks' company, eventually climbing the ladder to serve as chief scenario editor. She later signed a long contract at MGM. During the 1920s, she was responsible for films like The Three Musketeers and The Fire Brigade.

At some point during the 1910s, she married physician Arthur Woods, brother of film pioneer Frank E. Woods.

She died in Los Angeles County, California, in 1957 at the age of 88.

== Partial filmography ==
- The Nut (1921)
- The Three Musketeers (1921)
- The Thief of Bagdad (1924)
- Don Q, Son of Zorro (1925)
- The Black Pirate (1926)
- The Flaming Forest (1926) (titles)
- The Fire Brigade (1926) (titles)
- Mr. Wu (1927) (titles)
- The Gaucho (1927), (as Scenario Editor)
