= Douglas Fairbanks in Robin Hood =

1922 film by Allan Dwan

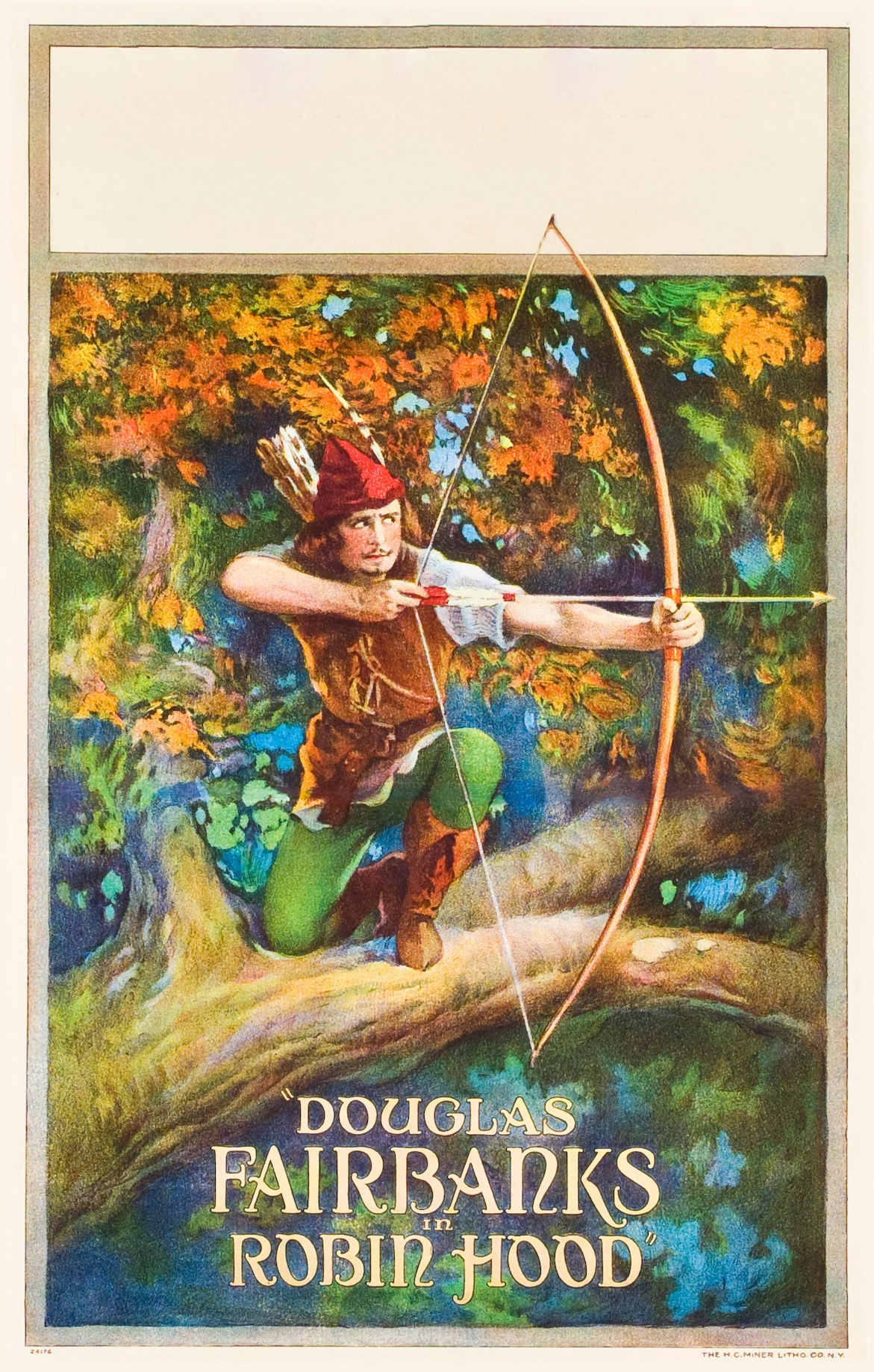
- Theatrical release poster
- Directed by: Allan Dwan
- Written by: Elton Thomas (pseudonym of Douglas Fairbanks)
- Produced by: Douglas Fairbanks
- Starring: Douglas Fairbanks; Wallace Beery; Sam De Grasse; Enid Bennett; Alan Hale
- Cinematography: Arthur Edeson & Charles Richardson
- Edited by: William Nolan
- Music by: Victor Schertzinger
- Production company: Douglas Fairbanks Pictures
- Distributed by: United Artists
- Release date: October 18, 1922
- Running time: 127 minutes 11 reels (10,680 feet (3,260 m))
- Country: United States
- Languages: Silent film English intertitles
- Budget: $930,000
- Box office: $2,500,000 (US/Canada)

Robin Hood is a 1922 silent adventure film starring Douglas Fairbanks and Wallace Beery. It was the first motion picture ever to have a Hollywood premiere, held at Grauman's Egyptian Theatre on October 18, 1922. The movie's full title, under which it was copyrighted, is Douglas Fairbanks in Robin Hood. It was one of the most expensive films of the 1920s, with a budget estimated at one million dollars (equivalent to $19.23 million in 2025). The film was a smash hit and generally received favorable reviews.

== Plot ==
The full film

The opening has the dashing Earl of Huntingdon besting his bitter enemy, Sir Guy of Gisbourne, in a joust. Huntingdon then joins King Richard the Lion-Hearted, who is going off to fight in the Crusades and has left his brother, Prince John, as regent. The prince soon emerges as a cruel, treacherous tyrant. Goaded on by Sir Guy, he usurps Richard's throne. When Huntingdon receives a message from Lady Marian Fitzwalter, his love interest, telling him of all that has transpired, he requests permission to return to England. King Richard assumes that the Earl has turned coward and denies him permission. The Earl seeks to leave in spite of this, but is ambushed by Sir Guy and imprisoned as a deserter. Upon escaping from his confines, he returns to England, endangering his life and honor, to oppose Prince John and restore King Richard's throne. He finds his friends and himself outlawed and Marian apparently dead.

Huntingdon returns to Nottingham and adopts the name of Robin Hood, acrobatic champion of the oppressed. Leading a band that defends the abused, including Friar Tuck, Little John, Will Scarlet, and Allan-a-Dale, he labors to set things right through swashbuckling feats and makes life miserable for Prince John and his cohort, the high sheriff of Nottingham. After rescuing Marian from Prince John's prison and defeating Sir Guy in a final conflict, Robin is captured. The timely reappearance of King Richard returns him to Marian and foils the efforts of Prince John.

== Cast ==
- Douglas Fairbanks as Earl of Huntingdon/Robin Hood (Fairbanks's custom was to place his name last.)
- Wallace Beery as King Richard the Lion-Hearted
- Sam De Grasse as Prince John
- Enid Bennett as Lady Marian Fitzwalter
- Paul Dickey as Sir Guy of Gisbourne
- William Lowery as The High Sheriff of Nottingham
- Willard Louis as Friar Tuck
- Alan Hale as The Squire/Little John
- Bud Geary as Will Scarlet
- Lloyd Talman as Allan-a-Dale
- Billie Bennett as Servant to Lady Marian

Wallace Beery played King Richard the Lion-Hearted again the following year in a sequel called Richard the Lion-Hearted.

Alan Hale, Sr., made such an impression as Little John in this film that he reprised the role 16 years later in The Adventures of Robin Hood (1938) opposite Errol Flynn, then played the character again in Rogues of Sherwood Forest in 1950, 28 years after his initial performance in the original Fairbanks film.

== Production ==
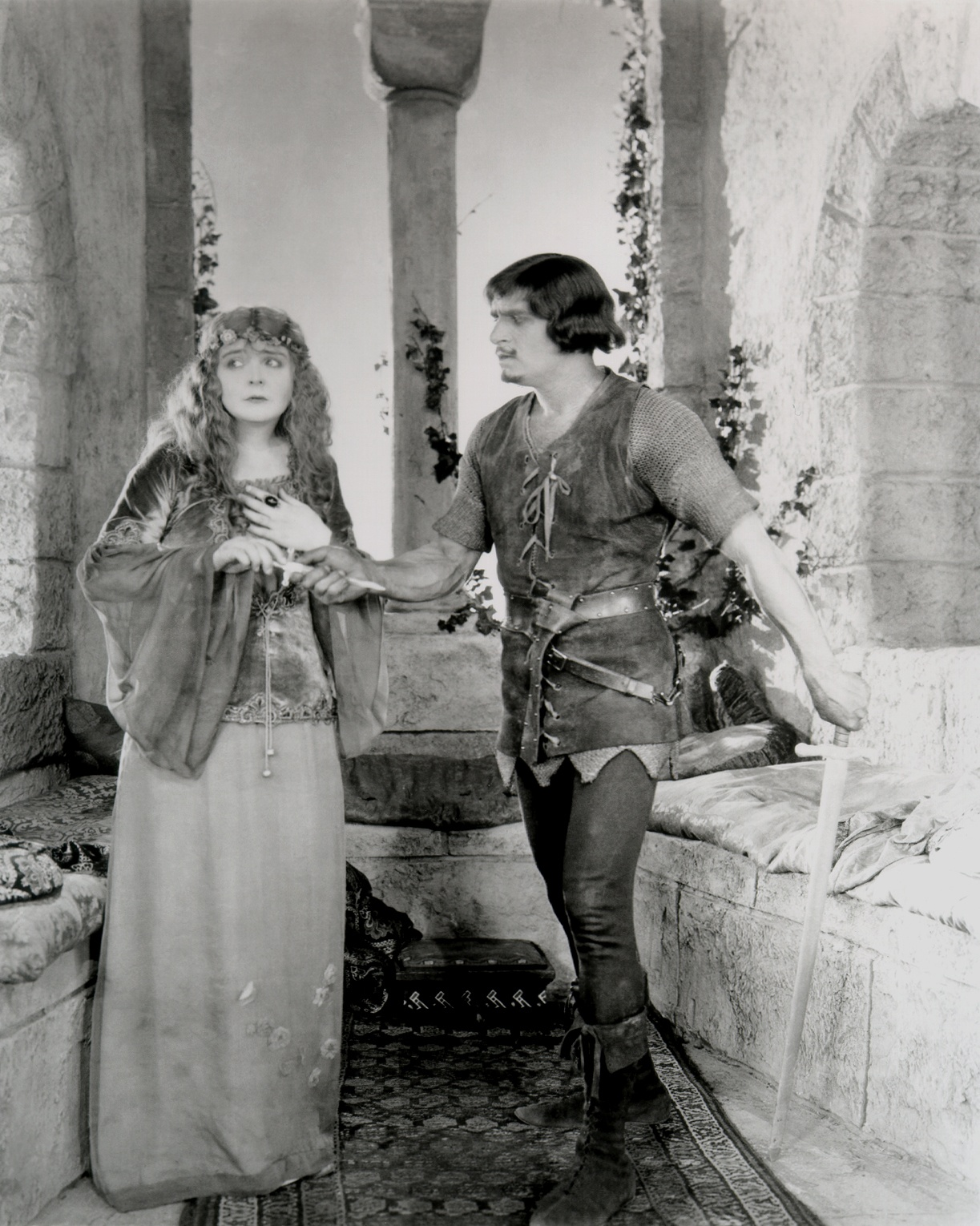
Robin and Marian

A huge castle set and an entire 12th-century village of Nottingham were constructed at the Pickford-Fairbanks Studio in Hollywood. Some sets were designed by architect Lloyd Wright. Director Allan Dwan later recalled that Fairbanks was so overwhelmed by the scale of the sets that he considered cancelling production at one point. The castle was largely built of wood, wire, and plaster. The exceptions were the concrete floor and the (wood-covered) steel drawbridge.

The story was adapted for the screen by Fairbanks (as "Elton Thomas"), Kenneth Davenport, Edward Knoblock, Allan Dwan, and Lotta Woods, and was produced by Fairbanks for his own production company, Douglas Fairbanks Pictures Corporation, and distributed by United Artists, a company owned by Fairbanks, his wife Mary Pickford, Charlie Chaplin, and D. W. Griffith. This swashbuckling adventure was based on the legendary tale of the medieval hero, Robin Hood, and was the first production to present many of the elements of the legend that became familiar to movie audiences in later versions, although an earlier treatment had been filmed a decade before in the woods around Fort Lee, New Jersey, featuring even more flamboyant costumes than the Fairbanks version.

== Score ==
At its premiere, Robin Hood was accompanied by an orchestral score especially commissioned by Fairbanks and composed by Victor Schertzinger. That score has also been adapted and conducted live by U.S. composer Gillian Anderson. Though the film has received many live and recorded scores since its first release, perhaps the two most significant are further orchestral scores written in 2007 by American composer and conductor John Scott, and in 2016 by eminent British silent film musician Neil Brand.

== Reception ==
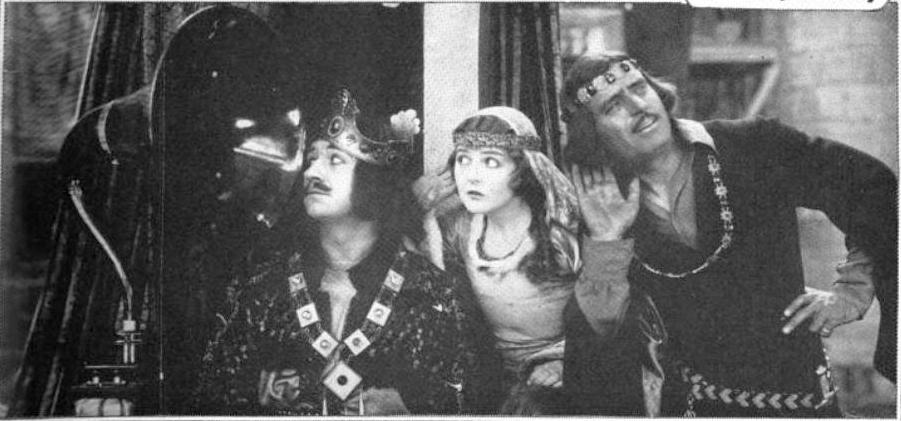
Wallace Beery, Enid Bennett, and Douglas Fairbanks listen to a recent invention only widely broadcasting for the previous three years: a radio.

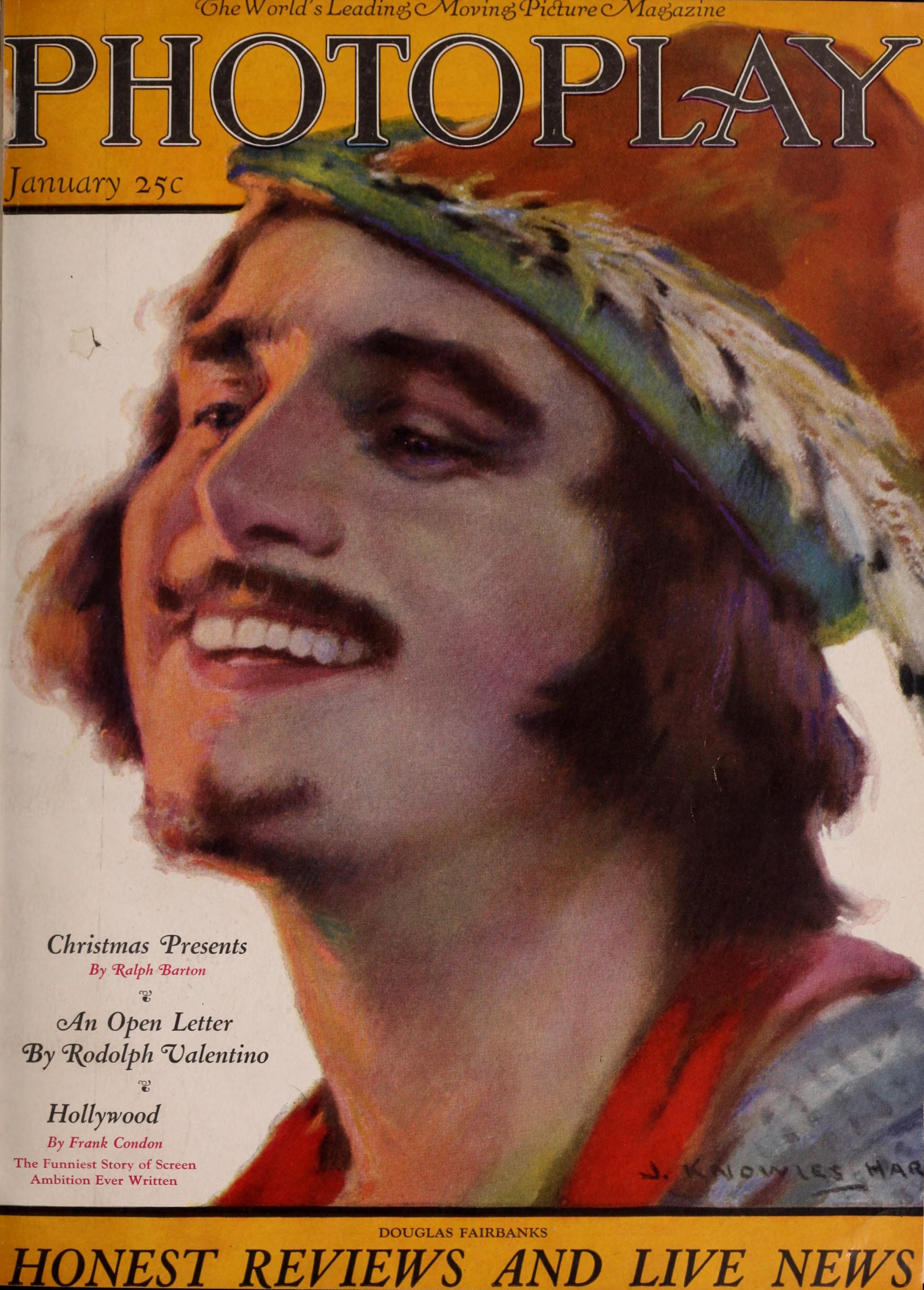
Fairbanks as Robin Hood on the cover of Photoplay, illustrated by J. Knowles Hare

Robin Hood generally received favorable reviews. It received an aggregate score of 100% and an average rating of 8.4/10 from Rotten Tomatoes based on 10 reviews. Combustible Celluloid's Jeffrey M. Anderson rated the movie 4 stars out of 4, concluding "Director Allan Dwan had worked with Fairbanks on several two-reelers, and would go on to direct his last silent film, The Iron Mask (1929). Dwan would continue working, making "B" pictures up until the 1960s, and finishing up with something like 500 films on his resume before he died. But Robin Hood is his masterpiece.".

Fairbanks biographer Jeffrey Vance evaluated the film in 2008 as follows: "Douglas Fairbanks in Robin Hood is the most important legacy of the rich life and career of Douglas Fairbanks. The towering sets are long gone, and the characters have been reimagined and reinterpreted, but the foundation the film was built upon—and the culture it created—exists to this day....The creation of Douglas Fairbanks in Robin Hood consumed nearly a year of his life, and the experience established the matrix for all of his subsequent silent film productions. Indeed, it was the first of his productions to be fully realized in every respect."

== See also ==
- List of films and television series featuring Robin Hood
- List of films with a 100% rating on Rotten Tomatoes, a film review aggregator website
