= The Flaming Forest =

1926 film directed by Reginald Barker

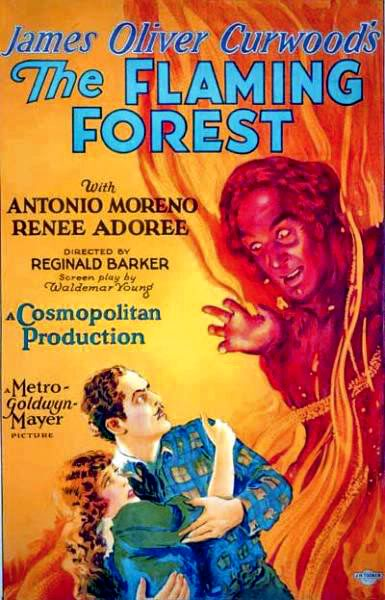
- Directed by: Reginald Barker
- Written by: Waldemar Young; Lotta Woods (titles)
- Based on: The Flaming Forest by James Oliver Curwood
- Starring: Antonio Moreno; Renée Adorée
- Cinematography: Percy Hilburn (*French)
- Edited by: Ben Lewis
- Distributed by: Metro-Goldwyn-Mayer
- Release date: November 21, 1926
- Running time: 70 minutes
- Country: United States
- Languages: Silent; English intertitles

The Flaming Forest is a 1926 American silent drama film directed by Reginald Barker and starring Antonio Moreno and Renée Adorée. The film is based on the novel of the same name by James Oliver Curwood, and was produced by Cosmopolitan Productions and distributed by Metro-Goldwyn-Mayer. A two-color Technicolor sequence was shot for a climactic blaze sequence featured in the film. The film is preserved at the Library of Congress.

== Plot ==
North-West Mounted Police sergeant David Carrigan fights Indians and woos Jeanne-Marie. As described in a film magazine review, the parents of Jeanne-Marie are killed when the renegade Indian Jules Lagarre raids the village. Lagarre continues his attacks and forces the people to quit their homes and property and Lagarre moves his forces into the hamlet. At this time, the North-West Mounted Police is just being organized, and in the detachment sent to the village is Sergeant David Carrigan. They arrive and drive off Lagarre and his men, but only temporarily. David falls in love with Jeanne-Marie. Her brother Roger, who is sort of a weakling, kills two of Lagarre's men, but the "justice for all" order forces David to arrest Roger, even though he is a relative of the woman he loves. For this, Jeanne-Marie vows her hate for David. Lagarre leads an Indian attack on the hamlet and a terrific battle is waged. Lagarre kidnaps Jeanne-Marie and Roger is killed trying to save her. David races through a blazing forest fire to her rescue and eventually the insurrection is quelled. David and Jeanne-Marie are now happy together.

== Cast ==
- Antonio Moreno as Sergeant David Carrigan
- Renée Adorée as Jeanne-Marie
- Gardner James as Roger Audemard
- William Austin as Alfred Wimbledon
- Tom O'Brien as Mike
- Emile Chautard as André Audemard
- Oscar Beregi, Sr. as Jules Lagarre
- Clarence Geldart as Major Charles McVane
- Frank Leigh as Lupin
- Charles Ogle as Donald McTavish
- Roy Coulson as François
- D'Arcy McCoy as Bobbie
- Claire McDowell as Mrs. McTavish
- Bert Roach as Sloppy
- Mary Jane Irving as Ruth McTavish

== See also ==
- List of early color feature films
