= Don Q, Son of Zorro =

1925 film

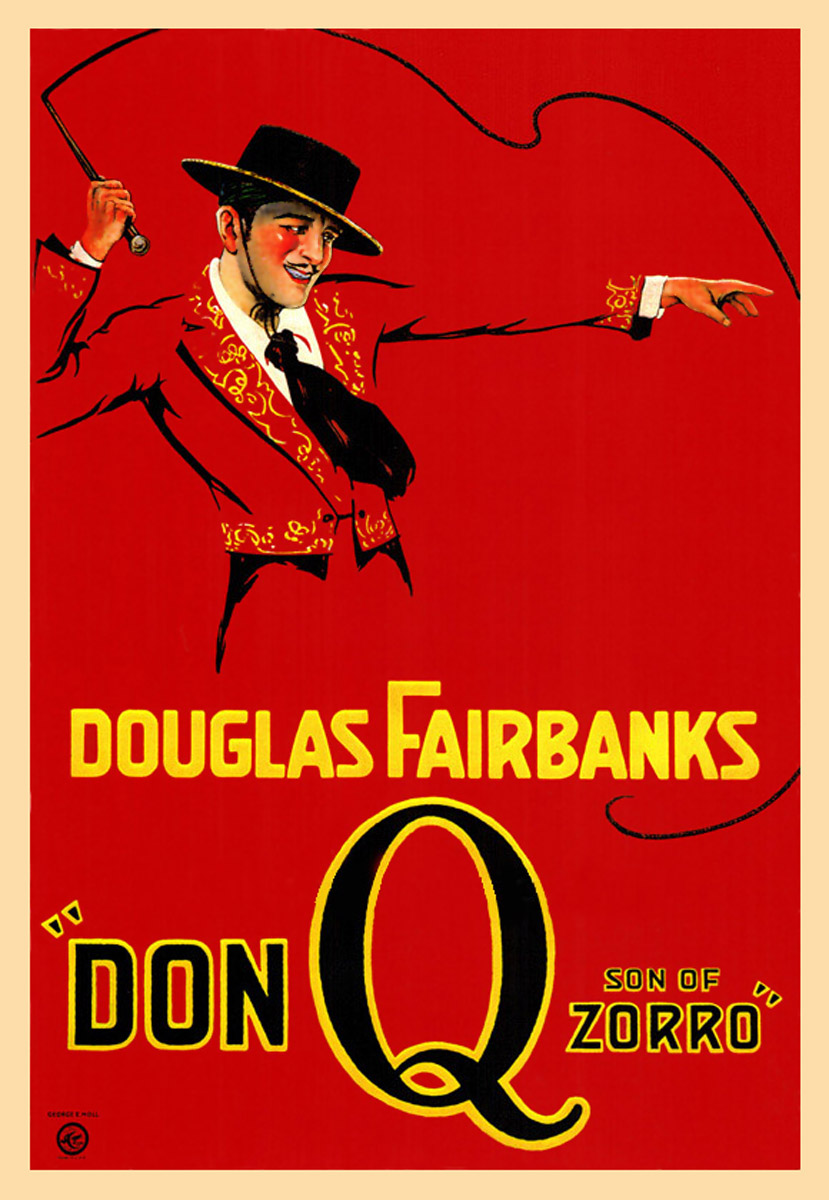
- Theatrical poster
- Directed by: Donald Crisp
- Written by: Jack Cunningham; Lotta Woods
- Based on: Don Q.'s Love Story by Kate and Hesketh Hesketh-Prichard
- Produced by: Douglas Fairbanks
- Starring: Douglas Fairbanks; Mary Astor
- Cinematography: Henry Sharp
- Edited by: William Nolan
- Music by: Mortimer Wilson
- Production company: Elton Corporation
- Distributed by: United Artists
- Release date: June 15, 1925
- Running time: 111 minutes
- Country: United States
- Languages: Silent; English intertitles
- Box office: $1.5 million (U.S. and Canada rentals)

Don Q, Son of Zorro (1925)

Don Q, Son of Zorro is a 1925 American silent swashbuckler romance film and a sequel to the 1920 silent film The Mark of Zorro. It was loosely based upon the 1909 novel Don Q.'s Love Story, written by the mother-and-son duo Kate and Hesketh Hesketh-Prichard. The story was reworked in 1925 (after Hesketh Hesketh-Prichard's death) into a vehicle for the Johnston McCulley character Zorro. The film adaptation was made by screenwriters Jack Cunningham and Lotta Woods for United Artists studios. Douglas Fairbanks both produced the film and starred as its lead character. It was directed by Donald Crisp, who also played the villain Don Sebastian.

The film was well-received: the New York Times rated it one of its top ten films of 1925.

== Plot ==
Don Diego de la Vega (Zorro)'s son, Cesar, is in Spain finishing his education. While Cesar is showing off to friends his remarkable prowess with the whip, he accidentally clips off the feather shako on the hat of Don Sebastian of the Palace Guard. Although Cesar apologizes immediately, Sebastian is unforgiving. Their duel is interrupted by a runaway bull. Trapped on the ground with his sword belt tangled in his boot, certain to be gored by the bull, Sebastian is saved at the last minute by Cesar. This further infuriates him. The action is observed by Queen Isabella and her guest, Austrian Archduke Paul; she requests Cesar's company immediately. Another friend of Cesar, Don Fabrique Borusta, offers to bring him to Her Majesty.

Meanwhile, Cesar encounters Dolores, daughter of his father's old friend, General de Muro, as she poses for a sculptor. It is love at first sight. But Sebastian, who comes from a poor family, has set his sights on Dolores and her family's wealth, and is determined to win her. Later, the Archduke invites Cesar to paint the town, with Sebastian as their "duenna." In a local tavern the Archduke offends the patrons, all seeming ruffians, by flirting with the dancer. Sebastian contrives his and the Duke's escape, but locks Cesar in the tavern to defend himself against the cutthroats. In the carriage that takes them away from what he is sure will be Cesar's death, Sebastian declares he has a meeting with Dolores. The Archduke invites himself along. While Sebastian asks the General for his daughter's hand, the Archduke sees Dolores serenaded by Cesar, who escaped (easily) and even acquired a guitar as a souvenir. Seeing the reactions of the young couple, the Archduke knows Cesar has won Dolores's heart.

Although penniless, Don Fabrique has designs on succeeding in society. He glues together a discarded invitation to the Archduke's Grand Ball, and crashes the party. At the ball, Cesar and Sebastian sit on either side of Dolores, both seeming frustrated in their efforts to woo her. The Archduke summons her to him. When Cesar sees the Archduke caress Dolores's cheek, Cesar becomes jealous and goes to confront him. But the Archduke assures him that he is working in Cesar's favor, and proves it by dragging Sebastian to another room to play cards while Cesar and Dolores dance together. Cesar pulls Dolores to a balcony for ardent sex. Fabrique sees them; when the pair are interrupted by Dolores's father, General de Muro, who recognizes Cesar and is ready to give his blessing, Fabrique believes they are about to be betrothed.

In the card room, the Archduke declares that Sebastian is as unlucky at cards as he is in love. Fabrique tiptoes in and tells the Archduke that he saw Cesar and Dolores kissing: surely they will be married now. The Archduke summons Cesar to congratulate him, to the horror of Sebastian. When he enters, Cesar is offended at the impropriety of this news, and learns that the source was Fabrique. Such bad manners should not go unpunished. He informs the Archduke that someone here doesn't belong, and asks if he should remove him. Archduke Paul nods, and Cesar pulls Fabrique out of the room by tugging his nose.

The Archduke continues to taunt Sebastian, a foolish move when Sebastian, enraged by jealousy, pulls his sword and stabs the Archduke before he realizes what he has done. He hides when Cesar, hearing something, enters, then strikes Cesar unconscious. He frames him for the Archduke's murder, then casually leaves. With his last dying energy, the Archduke pulls a playing card off the table and writes on it: "Sebastian assassinated me. Archduke Paul".

Fabrique enters, finds Cesar unconscious, finds the playing card and, miffed at Cesar's insult, takes it. Shortly thereafter he confronts Sebastian with his demands: to be appointed Civil Governor. Both stand by while the Guard arrests Cesar for the murder and orders his immediate execution to prevent an international incident. But General de Muro offers Cesar a gentleman's way out by giving him a dagger. Cesar pretends to stab himself and falls to the moat below the castle.

Months pass, while Cesar hides in the ruins of the old family castle. He pretends to be Don Q, for "a trick must be answered by a trick!" Fabrique has become Civil Governor, receiving regular pay-offs from Sebastian. Fabrique has even taken over Cesar's servants, and maidservant Lola (Lottie Pickford), seeing how Sebastian behaves around Fabrique, runs to tell Cesar that although gossip says they are close friends, in truth Sebastian is afraid of Fabrique. This will prove the leverage Cesar needs to establish his innocence.

After months of mourning over Cesar, Dolores is pushed to marry Sebastian. Just as she is about to sign the marriage contract with Sebastian, Cesar appears at the window. He is alive! The Queen orders Cesar's arrest. The best man to find him: that one-eyed ferret, Colonel Matsado. But when Matsado stops at a country inn on his way into the city, Cesar waylays him, steals his uniform and impersonates him. Back in the city Cesar as Matsado pretends to beat his (now Fabrique's) old manservant Robledo for information on Cesar's whereabouts, then convinces Fabrique to accompany him to the ruins where Cesar has been living these past months. There he is determined to find what hold Fabrique has on Sebastian.

In a whirlwind finish, Sebastian and the real Matsado track Cesar to his lair, as do his father, Zorro, who with the mute faithful family servant Bernardo, has sailed from California to Spain to help. On the way to the ruins they pass Dolores and her mother along the same road. Finally, as all gather at the ruins, Zorro and Don Q battle the soldiers, Fabrique confesses, Sebastian is beaten, de Muro recognizes his old friend, the villains are arrested, and Cesar and Dolores are reunited.

== Cast ==
- Douglas Fairbanks as Don Cesar de Vega / Zorro
- Mary Astor as Dolores de Muro
- Jack McDonald as General de Muro
- Donald Crisp as Don Sebastian
- Stella De Lanti as the Queen
- Warner Oland as The Archduke
- Jean Hersholt as Don Fabrique Borusta
- Albert MacQuarrie as Colonel Matsado
- Lottie Pickford as Lola (credited Lottie Pickford Forrest)
- Charles Stevens as Robledo
- Tote Du Crow as Bernardo
- Martha Franklin as The Duenna
- Juliette Belanger as The Danger
- Roy Coulson as Dancer's Admirer
- Enrique Acosta as Ramon
