= The Fire Brigade =

1926 film

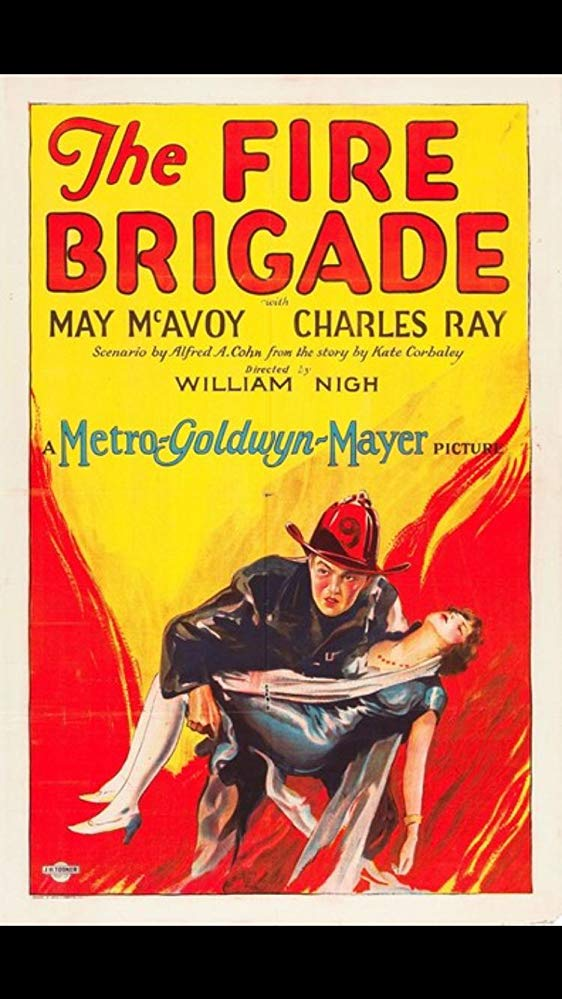
- Directed by: William Nigh
- Written by: Robert N. Lee (adaptation); Lotta Woods (titles)
- Story by: Kate Corbaley
- Starring: May McAvoy; Charles Ray
- Cinematography: John Arnold
- Edited by: Harry L. Decker
- Distributed by: Metro-Goldwyn-Mayer
- Release date: December 20, 1926
- Running time: 90 minutes
- Country: United States
- Languages: Silent; English intertitles
- Budget: $249,556

The Fire Brigade (also known as Fire!) is 1926 American silent drama film directed by William Nigh. The film stars May McAvoy and Charles Ray. The Fire Brigade originally contained sequences shot in two-color Technicolor. A print of the film is preserved in the Metro-Goldwyn-Mayer/United Artists archives.

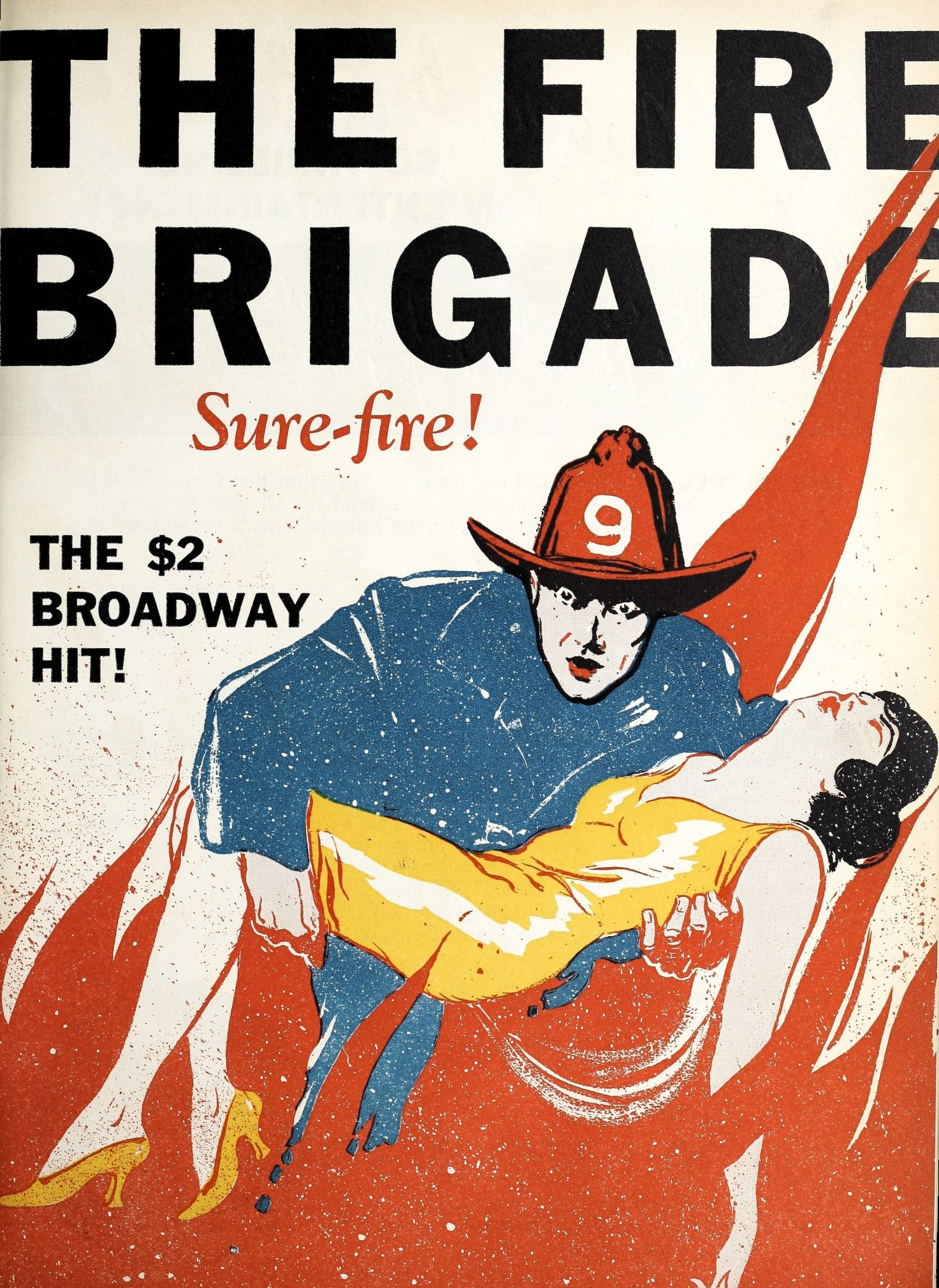
The Fire Brigade ad in Exhibitors Herald, 1926

The producers of the film contributed 25 per cent of the film's receipts toward a college for the instruction of fire-fighting officers.

== Plot ==
Terry O'Neil is the youngest of a group of Irish-American firefighting brothers. He courts Helen Corwin, the daughter of a politician whose crooked building contracts resulted in devastating blazes.

== Cast ==
- May McAvoy as Helen Corwin
- Charles Ray as Terry O'Neil
- Holmes Herbert as James Corwin
- Tom O'Brien as Joe O'Neil
- Eugenie Besserer as Mrs. O'Neil
- Warner Richmond as Jim O'Neil
- Bert Woodruff as Captain O'Neil
- Vivia Ogden as Bridget
- DeWitt Jennings as Fire Chief Wallace
- Dan Mason as Peg Leg Murphy
- Erwin Connelly as Thomas Wainright

== See also ==
- List of early color feature films
