= Jeffrey Vance =

American film historian and author

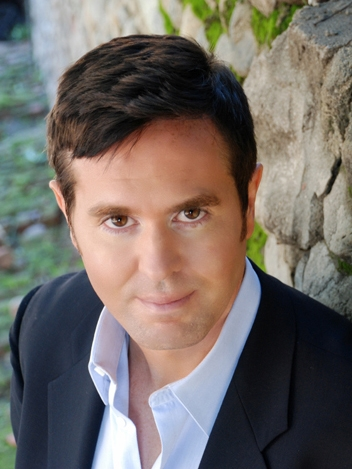
- Born: May 21, 1970 (age 55); Cleveland, Ohio, U.S.
- Occupations: Film historian, author

Jeffrey Vance (born May 21, 1970) is an American film historian and author who has published books on movie stars including Buster Keaton and Charlie Chaplin.

== Career ==
While working as an archivist for Metro-Goldwyn-Mayer/United Artists he met Eleanor Keaton, Buster Keaton's widow, and began organizing her collection of photographs, leading to the illustrated biography Buster Keaton Remembered (2001). He later served as archivist for the Chaplin family's Roy Export S.A.S., The Harold Lloyd Trust, and the Mary Pickford Foundation where he helped preserve both film and photographs from these important collections. As a producer, he packaged the Harold Lloyd Classic Comedies for Turner Classic Movies, later released to home video. As a filmmaker, he produced and directed the short film Rediscovering John Gilbert (2010) which aired on cable television as well as released to home video.

== Publications ==
- Buster Keaton Remembered (Harry N. Abrams, 2001)
- Harold Lloyd: Master Comedian (Harry N. Abrams, 2002)
- Chaplin: Genius of the Cinema (Harry N. Abrams, 2003),
- Douglas Fairbanks (UC Press/Academy of Motion Picture Arts and Sciences, 2008)
- A Star Is Born: Judy Garland and the Film That Got Away (TCM/Running Press, 2018)
- The Greatest Star: Behind the Scenes of Sunset Boulevard (Weldon Owen, 2025)

== DVD/Blu-ray commentaries ==
- The Circus (1928 film) (Criterion Collection 2019)
- Animal Crackers (Universal Pictures 2016)
- City Lights (Criterion Collection 2013)
- The Big Parade (Warner Home Video 2013)
- On Approval (Inception Media 2013)
- The Thief of Bagdad (Cohen Film Collection 2013)
- Grand Hotel (Warner Home Video 2013)
- The Gold Rush (Criterion Collection 2012)
- Sparrows (Milestone Film & Video 2012)
- Bardelys the Magnificent (Flicker Alley 2009)
- Midnight Mary (Warner Home Video 2009)
- A Modern Musketeer (Flicker Alley 2008)
- Picture Snatcher (Warner Home Video 2008)
- Night Nurse (Warner Home Video 2008)
- The Divorcee (Warner Home Video 2008)
- The Mysterious Lady (Warner Home Video 2005)
- Spite Marriage (Warner Home Video 2004)
