= Boskop Man =

Hominin fossil

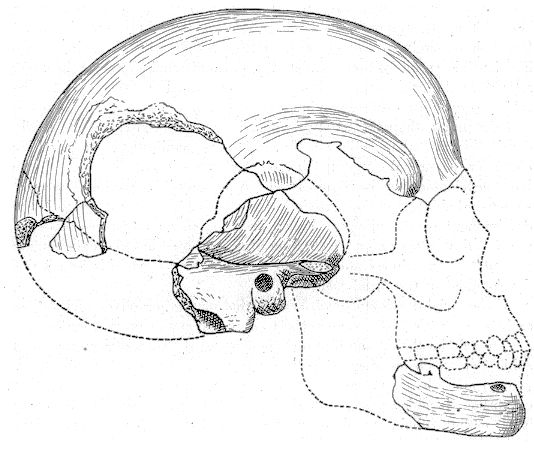
The restored Boskop 1 skull: The bones in the shaded areas have been preserved. From: Broom, R (1918).

The Boskop Man is an anatomically modern human fossil of the Middle Stone Age (Late Pleistocene) discovered in 1913 in South Africa. The fossil was at first described as Homo capensis and considered a separate human species by Broom (1918), but by the 1970s this "Boskopoid" type was widely recognized as representative of the modern Khoisan populations.

== Discovery ==
Most theories regarding a "Boskopoid" type were based on the eponymous Boskop cranium, which was found in 1913 by two Afrikaner farmers. They offered it to Frederick William FitzSimons for examination and further research. Many similar skulls were subsequently discovered by paleontologists such as Robert Broom, William Pycraft and Raymond Dart.

The original skull was incomplete consisting of frontal and parietal bones, with a partial occiput, one temporal and a fragment of mandible.

Fossils of similar type are known from Tsitsikamma (1921), Matjes River (1934), Fish Hoek and Springbok Flats, Skhul, Qafzeh, Border Cave, Brno, Tuinplaas, and other locations.

== Cranial capacity ==
The Boskop Man fossils are notable for their unusually large cranial capacities, with reported cranial-capacity ranges between 1,700 and 2,000 cm^{3}. It has been concluded that whenever archaeologists uncovered Hottentot skulls that possessed an especially large cranial capacity, they likely labeled them as Boskopoid skulls and as such, the Boskopoid skull type was simply an artifact of their biases. For instance, when James Henderson Sutherland Gear identified skulls recovered from Tsitsikamma as Boskopoid, he simply compared them with the original Boskop Man skull without comparing them with any modern African skulls and as a result, failed to realize they were Hottentot skulls.

In the book Big Brain: The Origins and Future of Human Intelligence (2008) by neurologists Gary Lynch and Richard Granger, it was claimed the large brain size in Boskop individuals might be indicative of particularly high general intelligence. Anthropologist John Hawks harshly criticized the depiction of the Boskop fossils in the book and in the book's review article in Discover magazine.

== Fraudulent photograph ==
An image has circulated across the Internet which is purported to be of a Boskopoid skull. However, this image in actuality depicts the skull of a person with hydrocephalus.

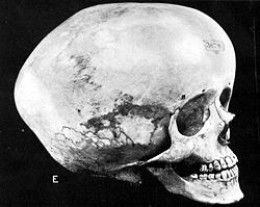
Hydrocephalic skull often falsely presented as a Boskopoid skull

== See also ==
- Wajak Man
