= Capheris fitzsimonsi =

Fitzsimons' Capheris Zodariid spider

Conservation status
- Least Concern (SANBI Red List)

Scientific classification
- Kingdom: Animalia
- Phylum: Arthropoda
- Subphylum: Chelicerata
- Class: Arachnida
- Order: Araneae
- Infraorder: Araneomorphae
- Family: Zodariidae
- Genus: Capheris
- Species: C. fitzsimonsi

Binomial name
- Capheris fitzsimonsi Lawrence, 1936

Species of spider

Capheris fitzsimonsi is a species of spider in the family Zodariidae. It is found across southern Africa and is commonly known as Fitzsimons' Capheris Zodariid spider.

== Etymology ==
The species is named in honor of Frederick William FitzSimons, a prominent South African zoologist and herpetologist who contributed significantly to southern African natural history.

== Distribution ==
Capheris fitzsimonsi occurs in four southern African countries: Botswana, Namibia, Zimbabwe, and South Africa. In South Africa, it has been recorded from the Northern Cape and Limpopo provinces at elevations ranging from 40 to 925 m above sea level.

== Habitat ==
The species is a burrow-dwelling spider found in the Savanna, Nama Karoo, and Succulent Karoo biomes.

== Description ==
Both males and females are known for this species. The carapace is dark chestnut brown with numerous short white hairs. The sternum is reddish-brown, and the chelicerae are dark brown. The legs are medium brown with darker femora, and the pedipalps are dark brown. The femora dorsally and distal dorsal margins of femora, patellae and tibiae have some white hairs. The opisthosoma is grey with numerous medium brown hairs and features a broad band of white hairs in the middle overlaying two series of small white spots anterior to a larger one.

== Conservation ==
The species is listed as Least Concern by the South African National Biodiversity Institute due to its wide geographical range across southern Africa. It is protected in three national parks: Augrabies Falls National Park, Richtersveld National Park, and Namaqua National Park.
