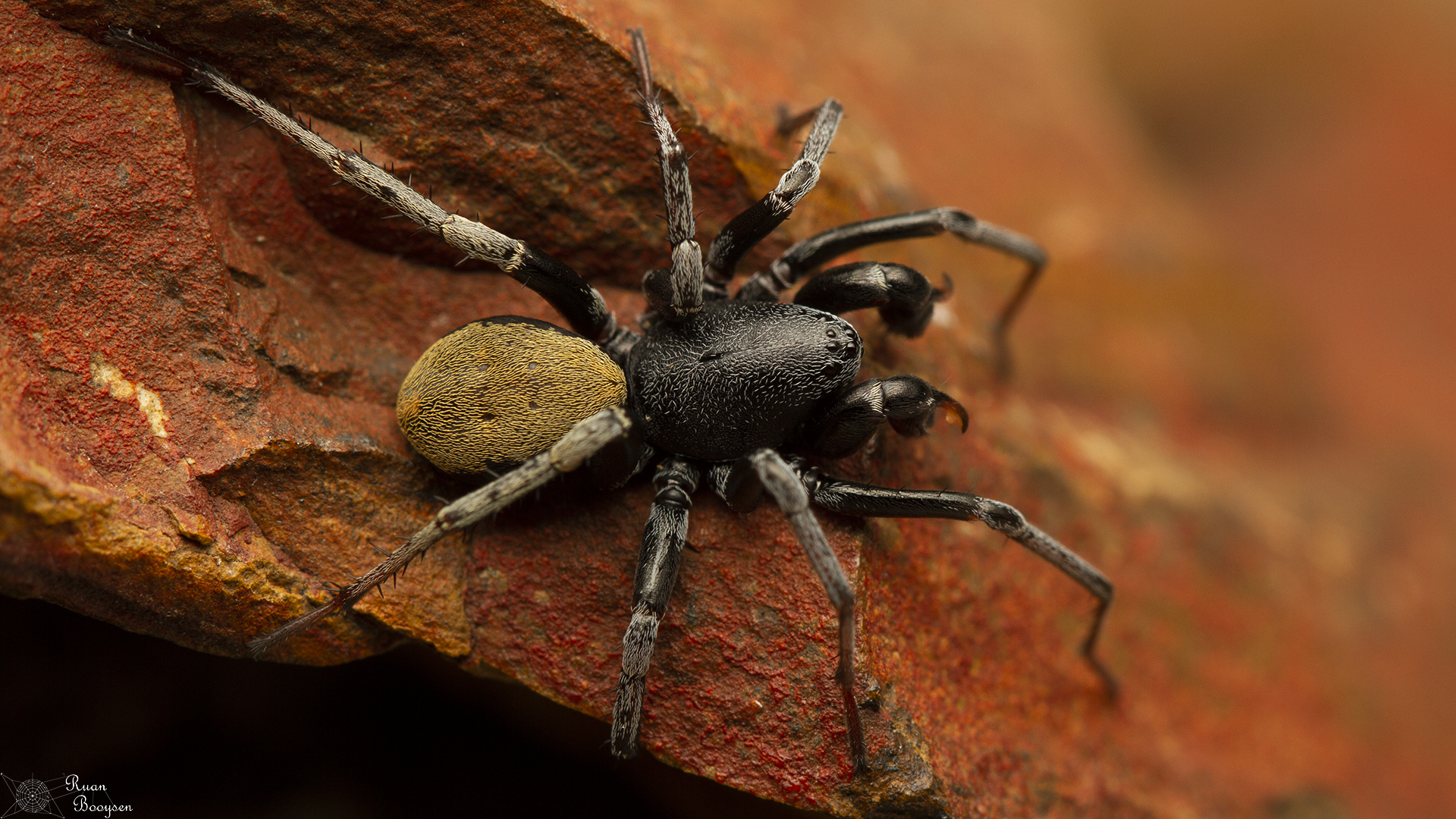

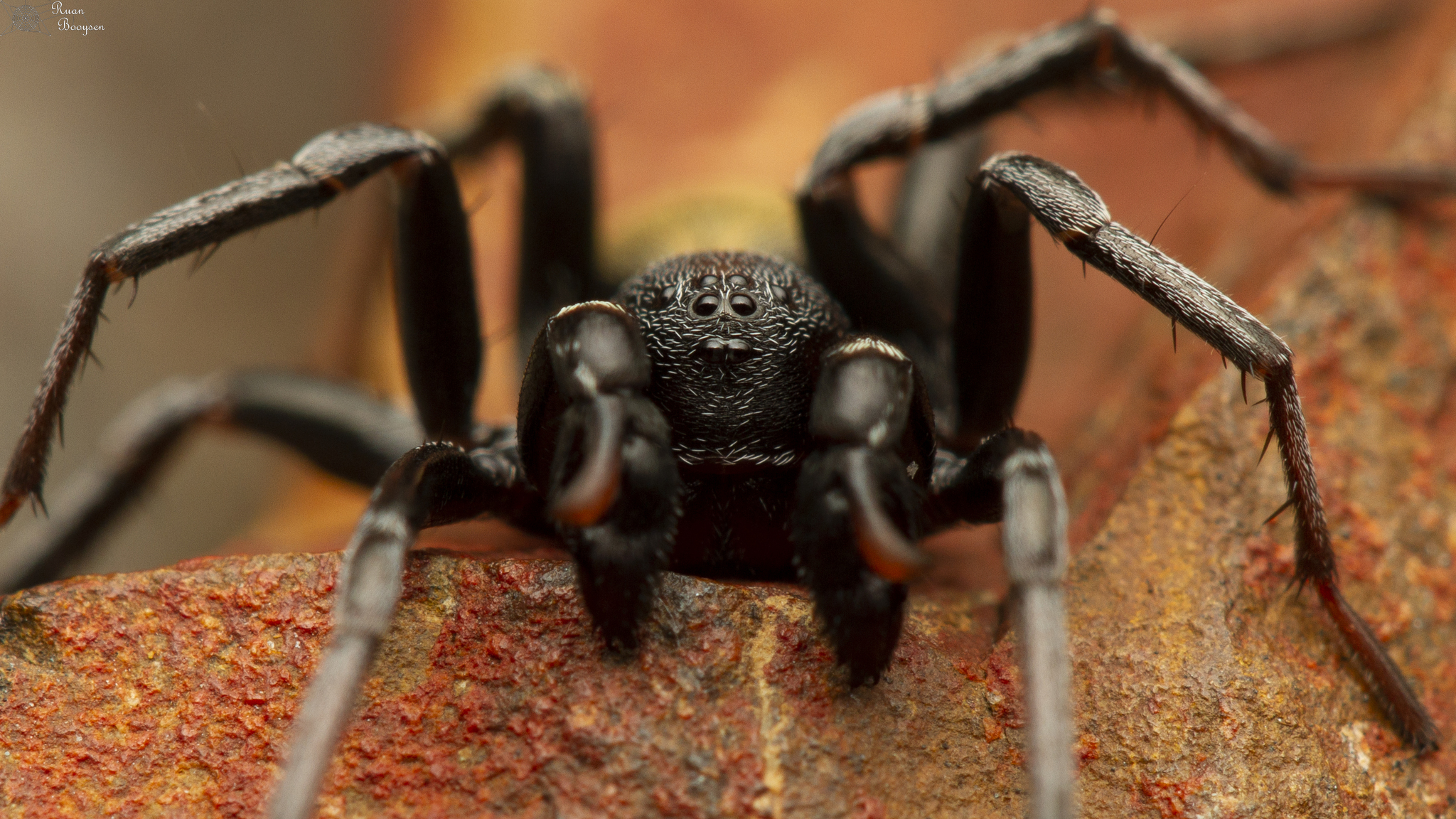

Scientific classification
- Kingdom: Animalia
- Phylum: Arthropoda
- Subphylum: Chelicerata
- Class: Arachnida
- Order: Araneae
- Infraorder: Araneomorphae
- Family: Zodariidae
- Genus: Capheris
- Species: C. crassimana

Binomial name
- Capheris crassimana (Simon, 1887)

Synonyms
- Cydrela crassimana Simon, 1887; Capheris haematilis Simon, 1910; Capheris oncka Lawrence, 1927

= Capheris crassimana =

Namibia Capheris Zodariid spider

Species of spider

Capheris crassimana is a species of spider in the family Zodariidae. It is found across southern Africa and is commonly known as the Namibia Capheris Zodariid spider.

The species was originally described by Simon in 1887 as Cydrela crassimana from Namibia.

== Distribution ==
Capheris crassimana occurs in five southern African countries: Angola, Botswana, Namibia, Mozambique, and South Africa. In South Africa, it has been sampled from Limpopo and the Northern Cape provinces at elevations ranging from 464 to 894 m above sea level.

== Habitat ==
The species inhabits ground-dwelling burrowing environments in the Nama Karoo and Savanna biomes.

== Description ==
Both males and females are known for this species. The carapace is dark chestnut brown with many short silvery hairs. The chelicerae and sternum are reddish-brown, while the legs are medium brown. The opisthosoma is dark grey, sparsely covered with silvery and brown hairs. The apodemes are orange, and the dorsum features a white patch in front and three faint pale chevrons with a longitudinal pale bar in the posterior part.

== Etymology ==
The specific name crassimana refers to the thick or stout nature of certain appendages.

== Conservation ==
The species is listed as Least Concern by the South African National Biodiversity Institute due to its wide geographical range across southern Africa. It is protected in five protected areas: Augrabies Falls National Park, Blouberg Nature Reserve, Kruger National Park, Lhuvhondo Nature Reserve, and Witsand Nature Reserve.
