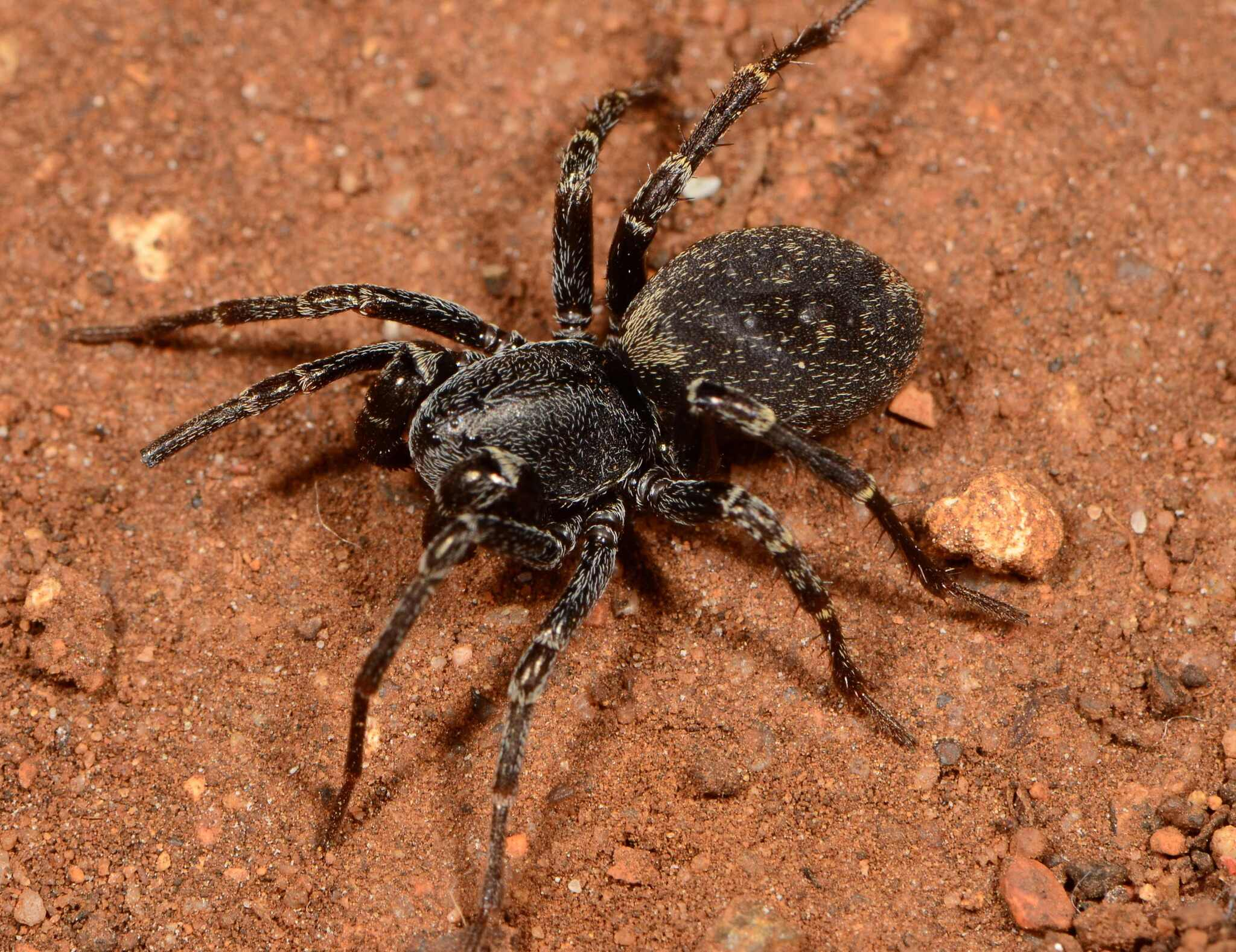
- Female C. langi
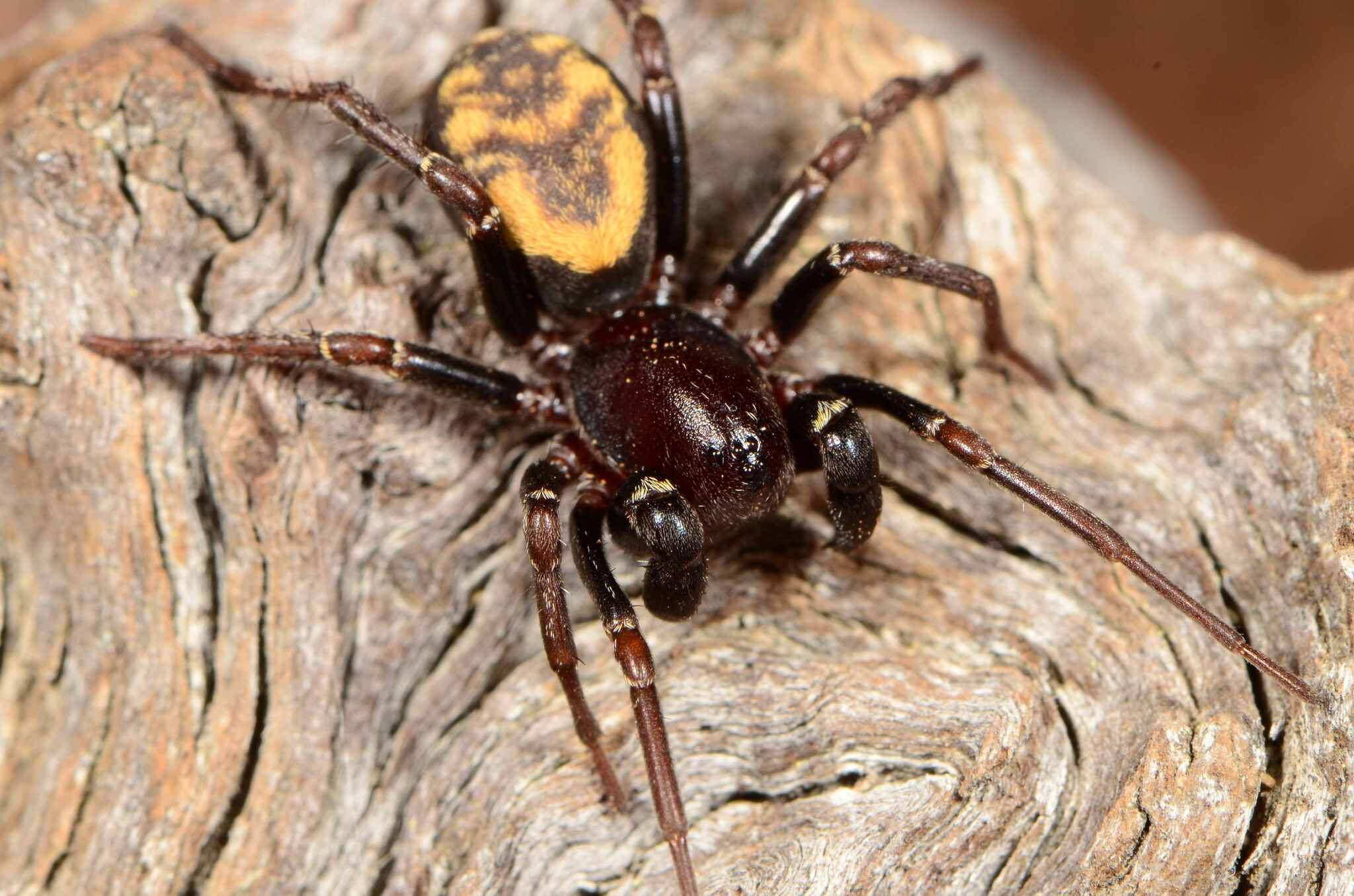
- Male C. subtilis

Scientific classification
- Kingdom: Animalia
- Phylum: Arthropoda
- Subphylum: Chelicerata
- Class: Arachnida
- Order: Araneae
- Infraorder: Araneomorphae
- Family: Zodariidae
- Genus: Capheris; Simon

Type species
- Capheris crassimana

Species
- 13, see text

= Capheris =

Genus of spiders

Capheris is a genus of spiders in the family Zodariidae with thirteen species from sub-Saharan Africa and India. It was first described in 1893 by Eugène Louis Simon.

== Species ==
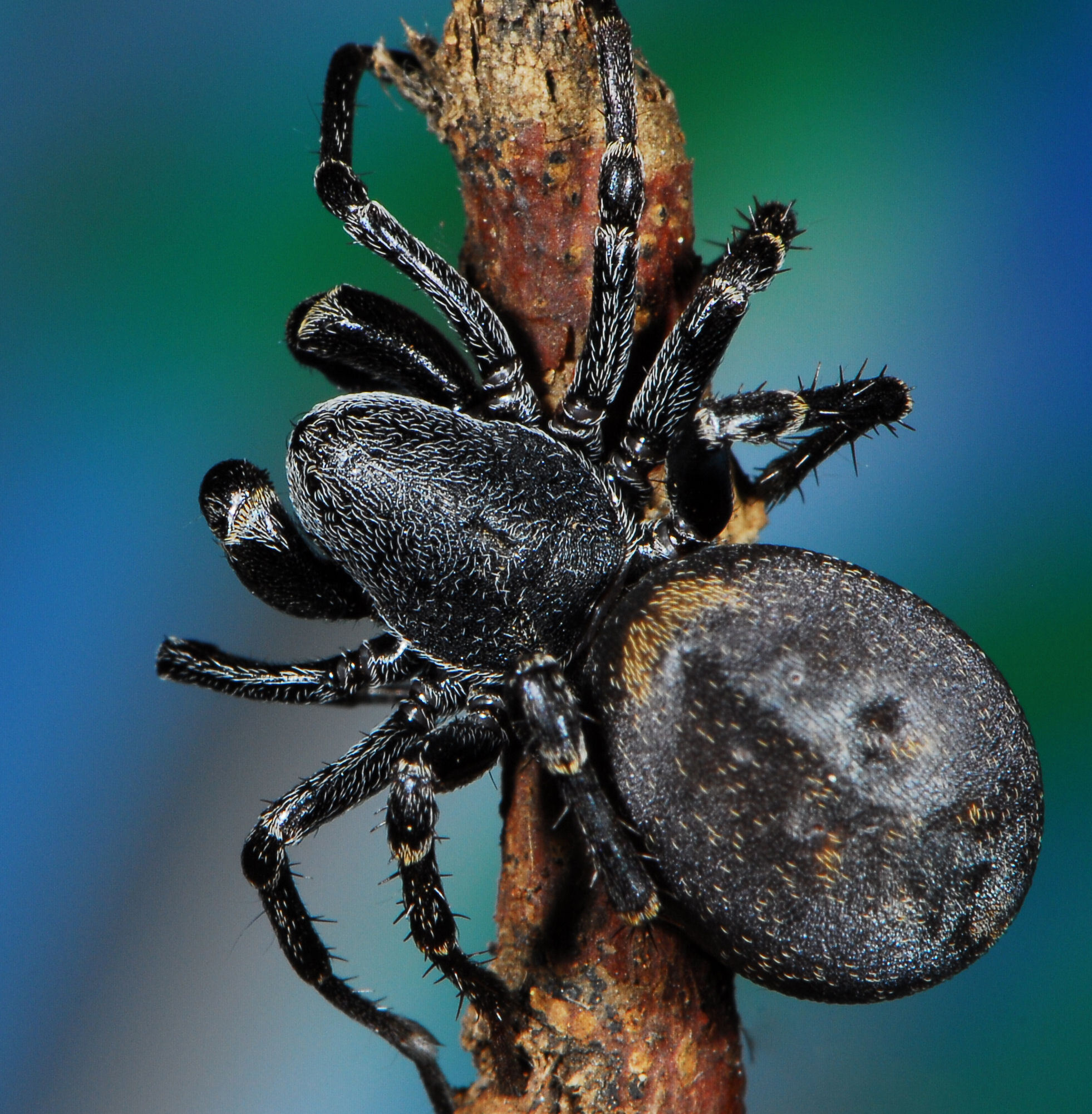
female C. decorata

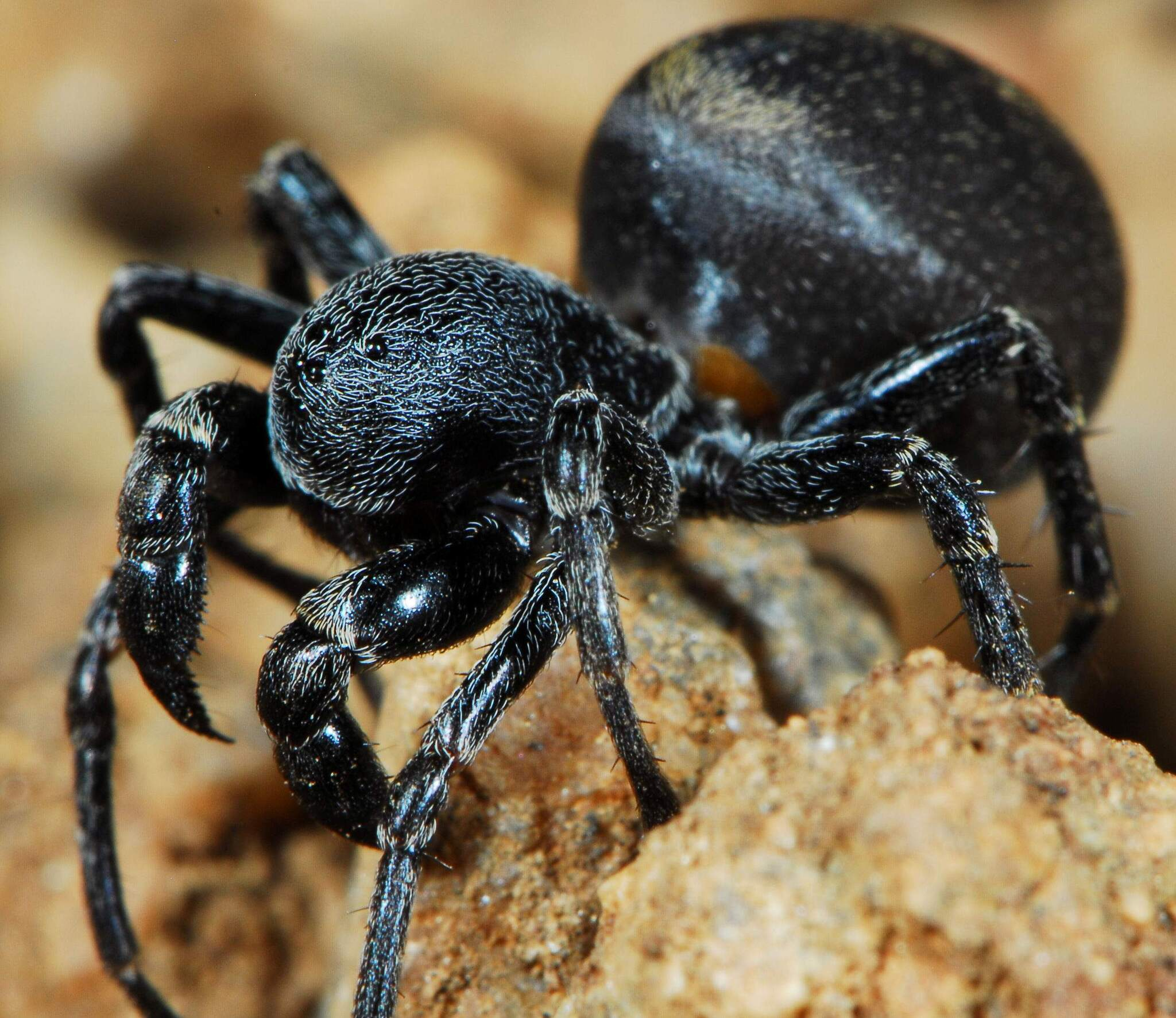
male C. decorata

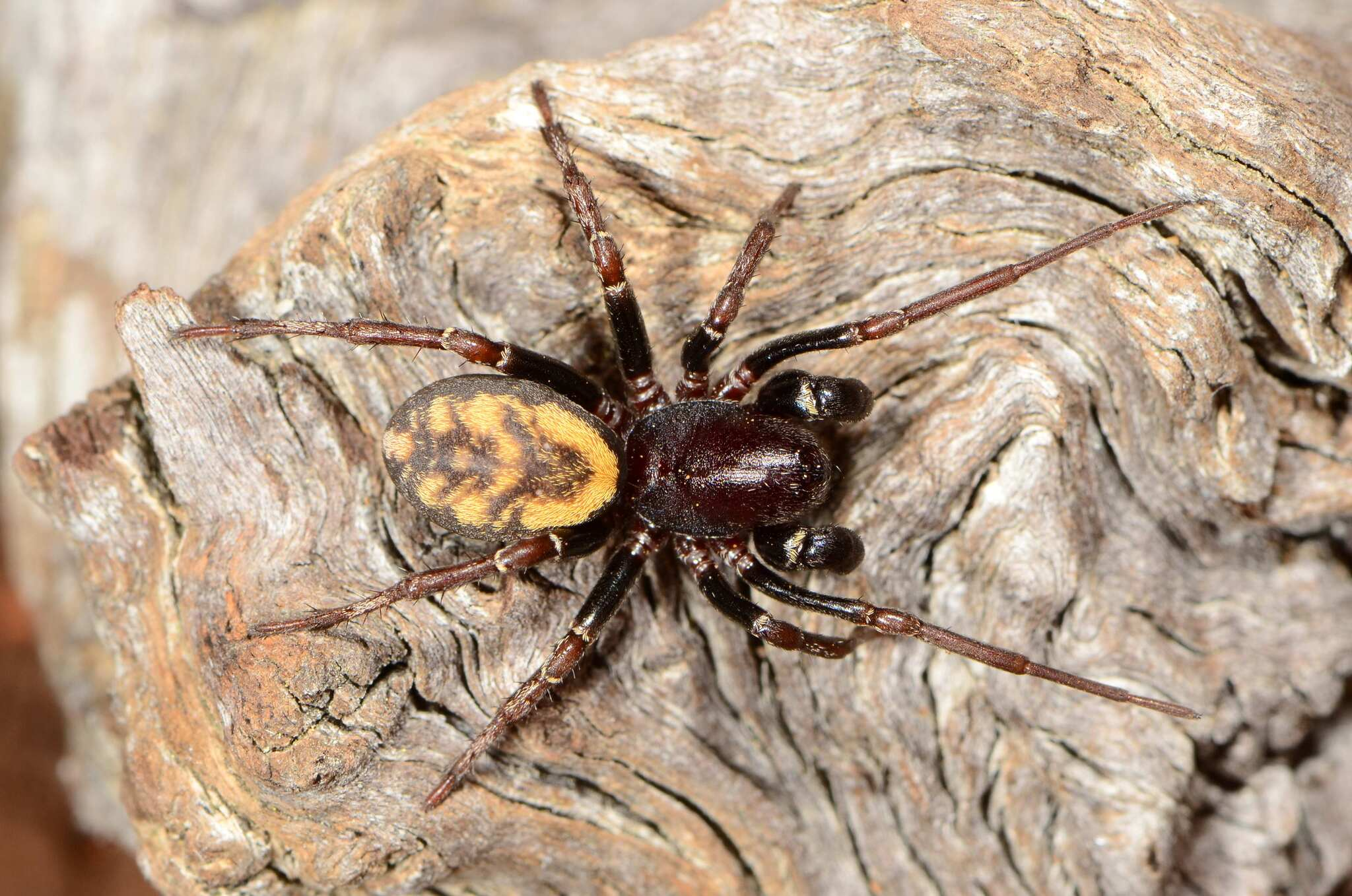
female C. subtilis

As of September 2025, this genus includes thirteen species:

- Capheris abrupta Jocqué, 2009 – South Africa
- Capheris apophysalis Lawrence, 1928 – Namibia
- Capheris approximata (Karsch, 1878) – Namibia, South Africa
- Capheris brunnea (Marx, 1893) – DR Congo
- Capheris crassimana (Simon, 1887) – Angola, Namibia, Botswana, South Africa (type species)
- Capheris decorata Simon, 1904 – Zambia, Botswana, Zimbabwe, Mozambique, South Africa
- Capheris escheri Reimoser, 1934 – India
- Capheris fitzsimonsi Lawrence, 1936 – Namibia, Botswana, Zimbabwe, South Africa
- Capheris kunenensis Lawrence, 1927 – Namibia
- Capheris langi Lawrence, 1936 – Botswana, South Africa
- Capheris oncka Lawrence, 1927 – Angola, Namibia, Botswana
- Capheris stillata Simon, 1905 – India
- Capheris subtilis Jocqué, 2009 – Namibia, Zimbabwe, South Africa
