= Tetradactylus udzungwensis =

Conservation status
- Endangered (IUCN 3.1)

Scientific classification
- Kingdom: Animalia
- Phylum: Chordata
- Class: Reptilia
- Order: Squamata
- Family: Gerrhosauridae
- Genus: Tetradactylus
- Species: T. udzungwensis

Binomial name
- Tetradactylus udzungwensis Salvidio, Menegon, Sindaco, & Moyer, 2004

Species of lizard

Tetradactylus udzungwensis, commonly known as the Udzungwa long-tailed seps, is a species of lizard in the family Gerrhosauridae. The species is found in Tanzania.
