= Cydrela unguiculata =

Scientific classification
- Kingdom: Animalia
- Phylum: Arthropoda
- Subphylum: Chelicerata
- Class: Arachnida
- Order: Araneae
- Infraorder: Araneomorphae
- Family: Zodariidae
- Genus: Cydrela
- Species: C. unguiculata

Binomial name
- Cydrela unguiculata (O. Pickard-Cambridge, 1871)

Synonyms
- Cydippe unguiculata O. Pickard-Cambridge, 1871

Species of spider

Cydrela unguiculata is a species of spider in the family Zodariidae. It is the type species of the genus Cydrela and is endemic to KwaZulu-Natal province of South Africa.

== Distribution ==
Cydrela unguiculata is known from two localities in KwaZulu-Natal: Phinda Private Game Reserve and an area 15 km north of Richards Bay.

== Habitat ==
The species occurs at approximately 29 m above sea level in the Indian Ocean Coastal Belt and Savanna biomes.

== Description ==
Male Cydrela unguiculata have a distinctive appearance with a cephalothorax that is much narrower in front than behind. The color is a dark shining chestnut-brown with very few fine hairs and bristles. The legs are dark yellowish-brown tinged with olive green, with the femora and undersides of the tibiae being the darkest.

The opisthosoma is oval and very convex above, clothed sparingly with hairs. The sides and underside are nearly black, while almost the whole upper side is occupied by a broad pale orange-yellow band that is somewhat indented or irregular on its outer margins.

== Conservation ==
The species is listed as Data Deficient because the female remains unknown and more sampling is needed to collect females and determine the species' true range.
