= Cydrela friedlanderae =

Scientific classification
- Kingdom: Animalia
- Phylum: Arthropoda
- Subphylum: Chelicerata
- Class: Arachnida
- Order: Araneae
- Infraorder: Araneomorphae
- Family: Zodariidae
- Genus: Cydrela
- Species: C. friedlanderae

Binomial name
- Cydrela friedlanderae Hewitt, 1914

Species of spider

Cydrela friedlanderae is a species of spider in the family Zodariidae. It is endemic to the Northern Cape province of South Africa.

== Distribution ==
Cydrela friedlanderae is known from two localities in the Northern Cape, De Aar and Benfontein Nature Reserve.

== Habitat ==
The species occurs at altitudes ranging from 1,172 to 1,242 m above sea level in the Savanna and Nama Karoo biomes. The original specimen from De Aar was collected from a burrow in the ground that was closed with a thick circular trapdoor.

== Description ==
The species is only known from the female.

Female Cydrela friedlanderae have a total length of 13 mm. The carapace, pedipalps, and proximal portions of the legs are black, while the tarsi and metatarsi are rufescent. The sternum is reddish-brown. The opisthosoma is black above and below with distinctive bright yellow markings: a large yellow median spot posteriorly, a fairly large yellow spot laterally at about the middle of the abdomen's length, and a narrow transverse yellow stripe anteriorly.

== Ecology ==
Cydrela friedlanderae is a burrowing species that constructs underground burrows sealed with circular trapdoors, demonstrating specialized fossorial behavior.

== Conservation ==
The species is listed as Data Deficient because the male remains unknown and the species is undersampled. It is protected in Benfontein Nature Reserve, but more sampling is needed to collect males and determine the species' true range.
