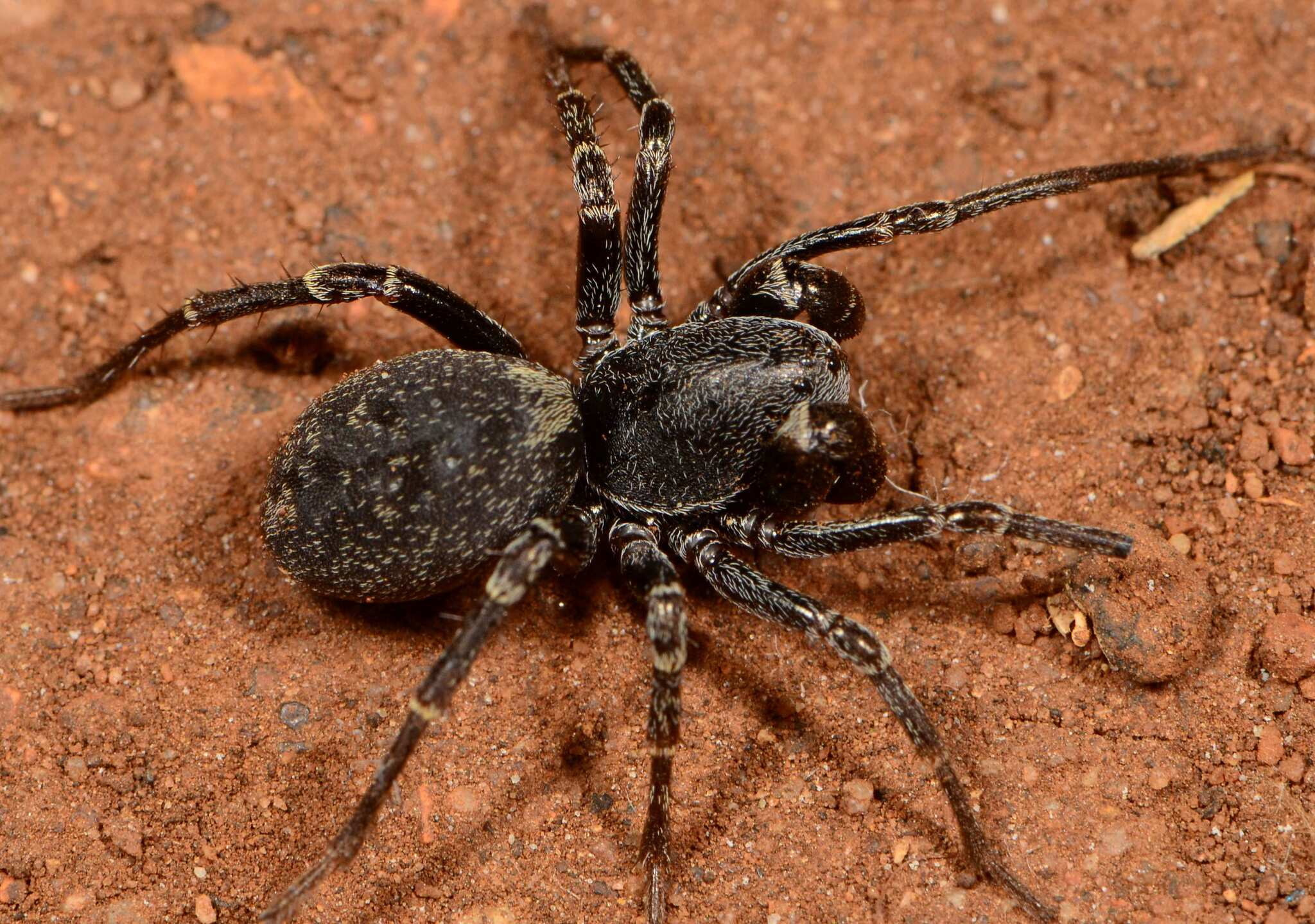
- Female
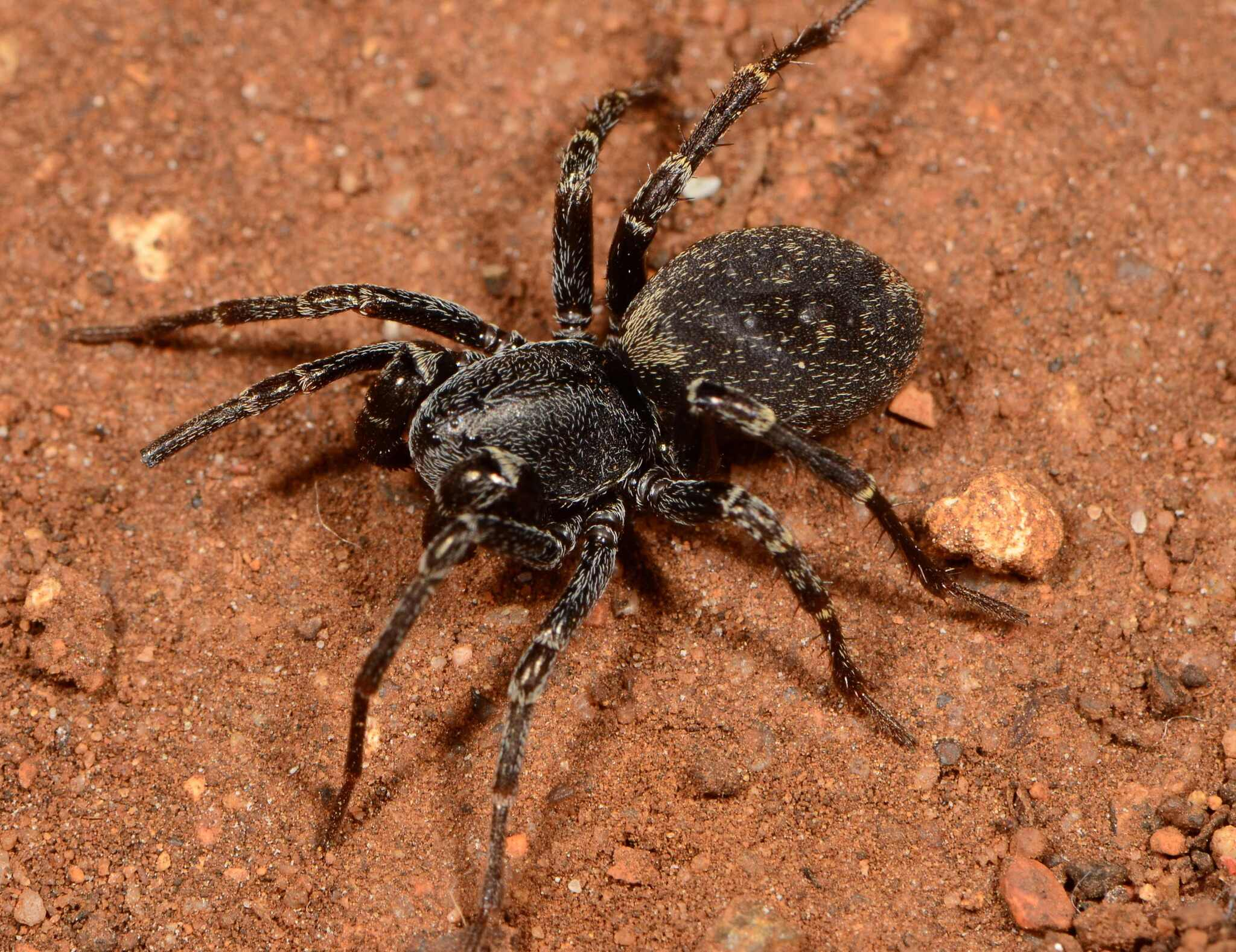
- Female

Scientific classification
- Kingdom: Animalia
- Phylum: Arthropoda
- Subphylum: Chelicerata
- Class: Arachnida
- Order: Araneae
- Infraorder: Araneomorphae
- Family: Zodariidae
- Genus: Capheris
- Species: C. langi

Binomial name
- Capheris langi Lawrence, 1936

= Capheris langi =

Lang's Capheris Zodariid spider

Species of spider

Capheris langi is a species of spider in the family Zodariidae. It is found in southern Africa and is commonly known as Lang's Capheris Zodariid spider.

== Etymology ==
The species is named in honor of Herbert Lang, who participated in the American Museum of Natural History's Congo Expedition and contributed to arachnological collections in Africa.

== Distribution ==
Capheris langi occurs in two southern African countries: Botswana and South Africa. In South Africa, it has been sampled from Limpopo province at elevations ranging from 418 to 959 m above sea level.

== Habitat ==
The species is a ground-living burrow-dweller found in the Savanna biome.

== Description ==
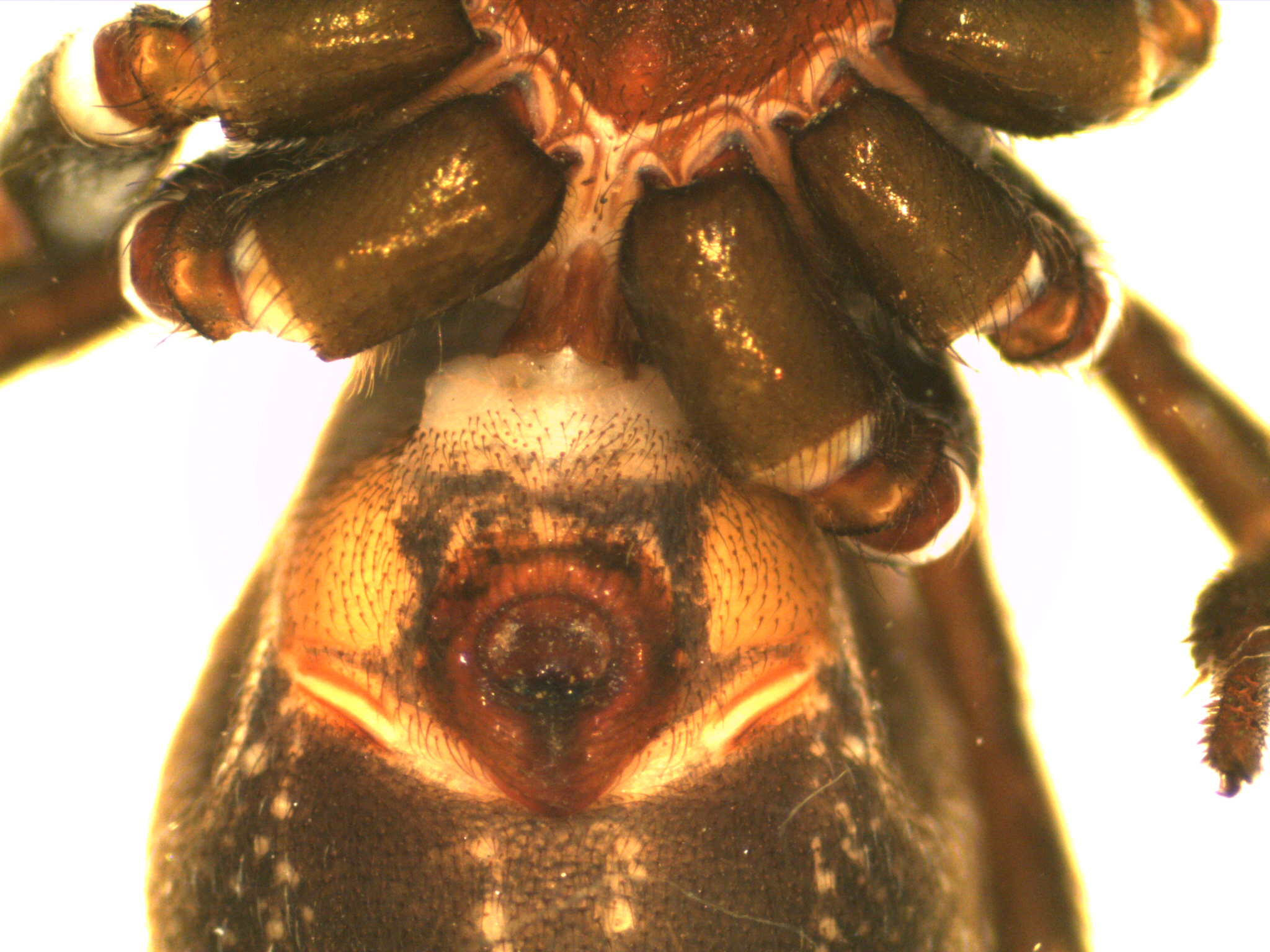
female

Only the female of Capheris langi is known. The carapace and legs are blackish-brown, while the sternum is orange. The legs are medium brown. The opisthosoma dorsum is uniform grey with four reddish apodemes and is sparsely covered with mixed, short, white and blackish hairs.

== Conservation ==
The species is listed as Least Concern by the South African National Biodiversity Institute due to its wide geographical range in southern Africa. It is protected in Kruger National Park, though more sampling is needed to collect the male.
