= Cydrela spinifrons =

Kuruman Cydrela Burrowing spider

Conservation status
- Least Concern (SANBI Red List)

Scientific classification
- Kingdom: Animalia
- Phylum: Arthropoda
- Subphylum: Chelicerata
- Class: Arachnida
- Order: Araneae
- Infraorder: Araneomorphae
- Family: Zodariidae
- Genus: Cydrela
- Species: C. spinifrons

Binomial name
- Cydrela spinifrons Hewitt, 1915

Species of spider

Cydrela spinifrons is a species of spider in the family Zodariidae. It is endemic to South Africa and is commonly known as the Kuruman Cydrela Burrowing spider.

== Distribution ==
Cydrela spinifrons is found across three South African provinces: Limpopo, Mpumalanga, and Northern Cape. Key localities include Kuruman, Kruger National Park, and several nature reserves in the Soutpansberg region.

== Habitat ==
The species occurs at altitudes ranging from 285 to 1558 m above sea level in the Grassland and Savanna biomes. Specimens have been collected using pitfall traps.

== Description ==
Female Cydrela spinifrons have a total length of 11 mm. The carapace and appendages are pale yellowish-brown. The opisthosoma is blackish-brown with distinctive pale markings including a shallow Λ-shaped band arranged transversely in the middle portion, followed by four somewhat indistinct transverse stripes. Laterally and inferiorly in the posterior half of the opisthosoma is a pale broad band that connects with the Λ-shaped mark on the dorsal surface and unites posteriorly just in front of the vent.

== Conservation ==
The species is listed as Least Concern by the South African National Biodiversity Institute due to its wide distribution. Although only known from females, it has a sufficiently broad geographical range. It is protected in five protected areas which are Blouberg Nature Reserve, Kruger National Park, Hanglip State Forest, Witsand Nature Reserve, and Benfontein Game Reserve.
