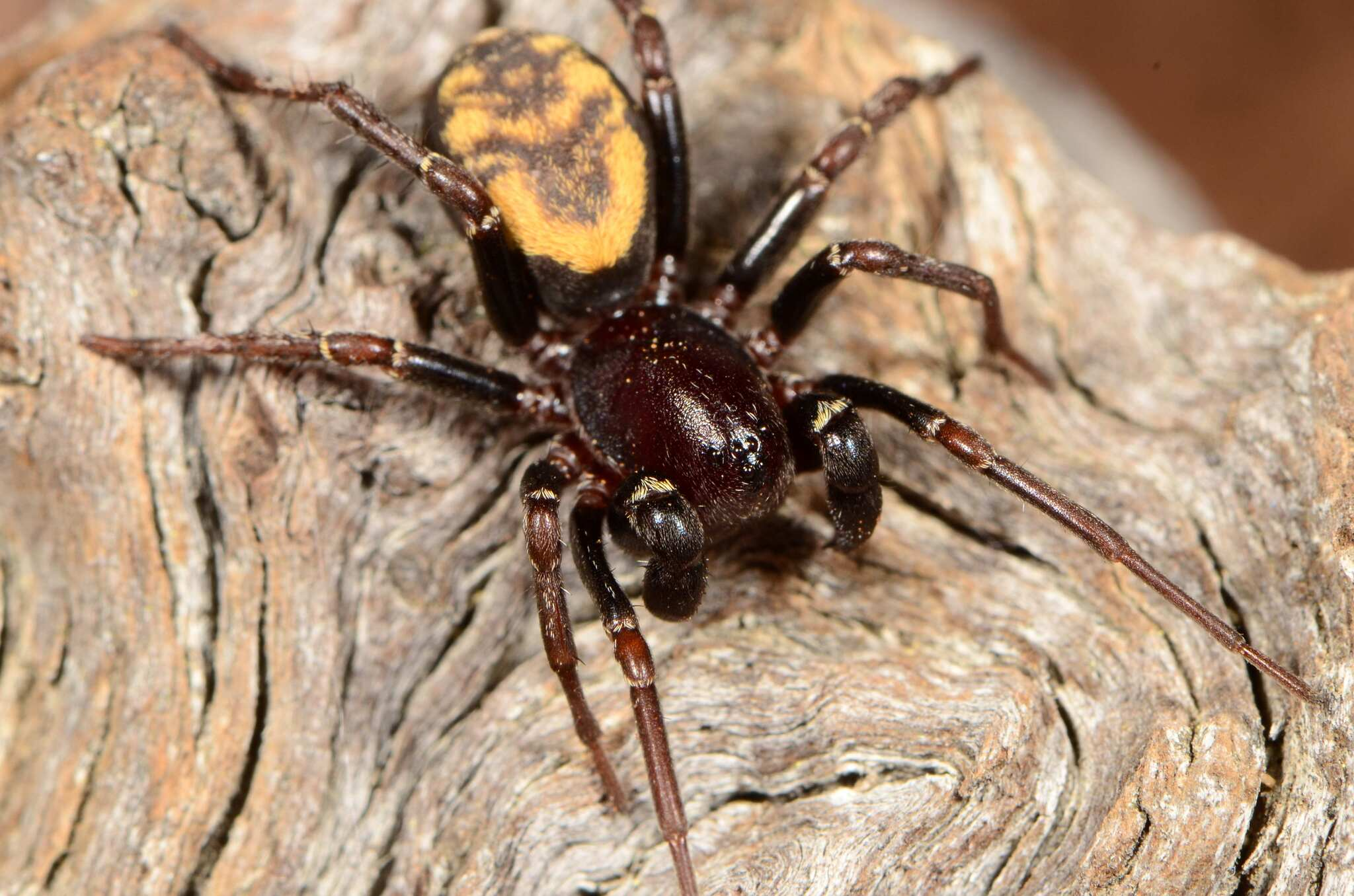
- Female
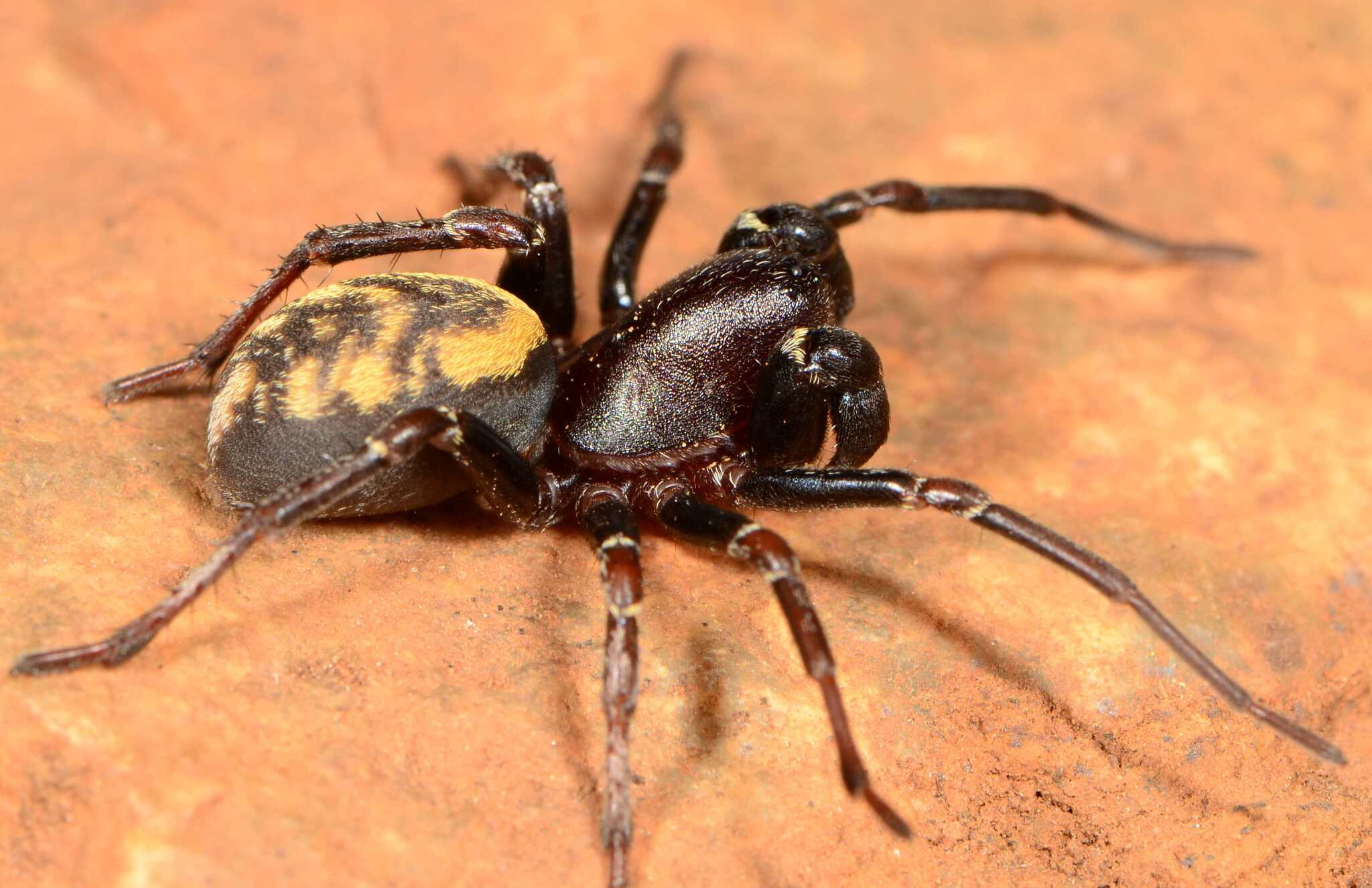
- Male

Scientific classification
- Kingdom: Animalia
- Phylum: Arthropoda
- Subphylum: Chelicerata
- Class: Arachnida
- Order: Araneae
- Infraorder: Araneomorphae
- Family: Zodariidae
- Genus: Capheris
- Species: C. subtilis

Binomial name
- Capheris subtilis Jocqué, 2009

= Capheris subtilis =

Namibian Capheris Zodariid spider

Species of spider

Capheris subtilis is a species of spider in the family Zodariidae. It is found in southern Africa and is commonly known as the Namibian Capheris Zodariid spider.

== Distribution ==
Capheris subtilis occurs in Namibia, Zimbabwe, and South Africa. In South Africa, it has been sampled from Limpopo province at an elevation of 615 m above sea level.

== Habitat ==
The species is a ground-living burrow-dweller found in the Savanna biome.

== Description ==
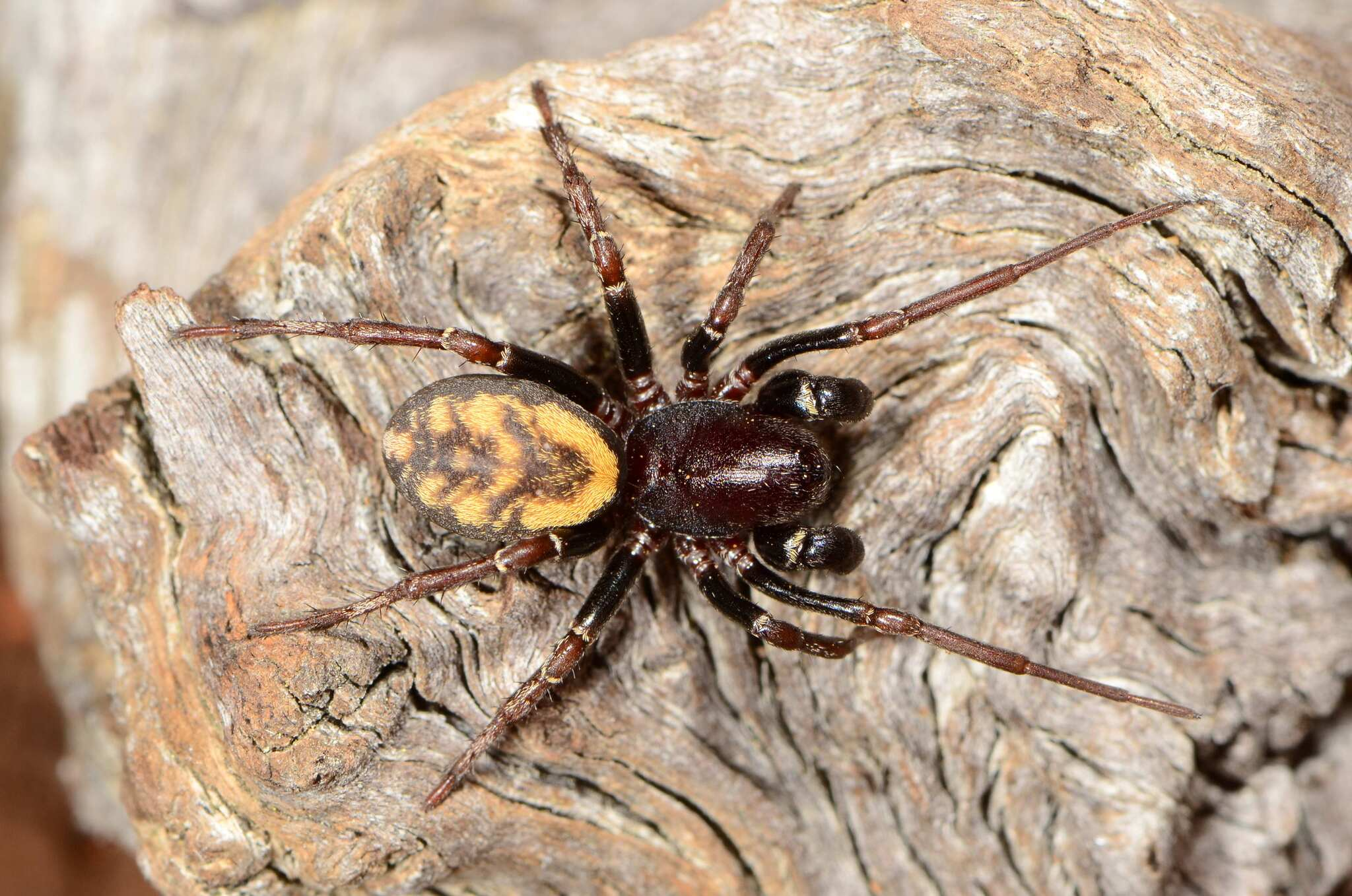
female

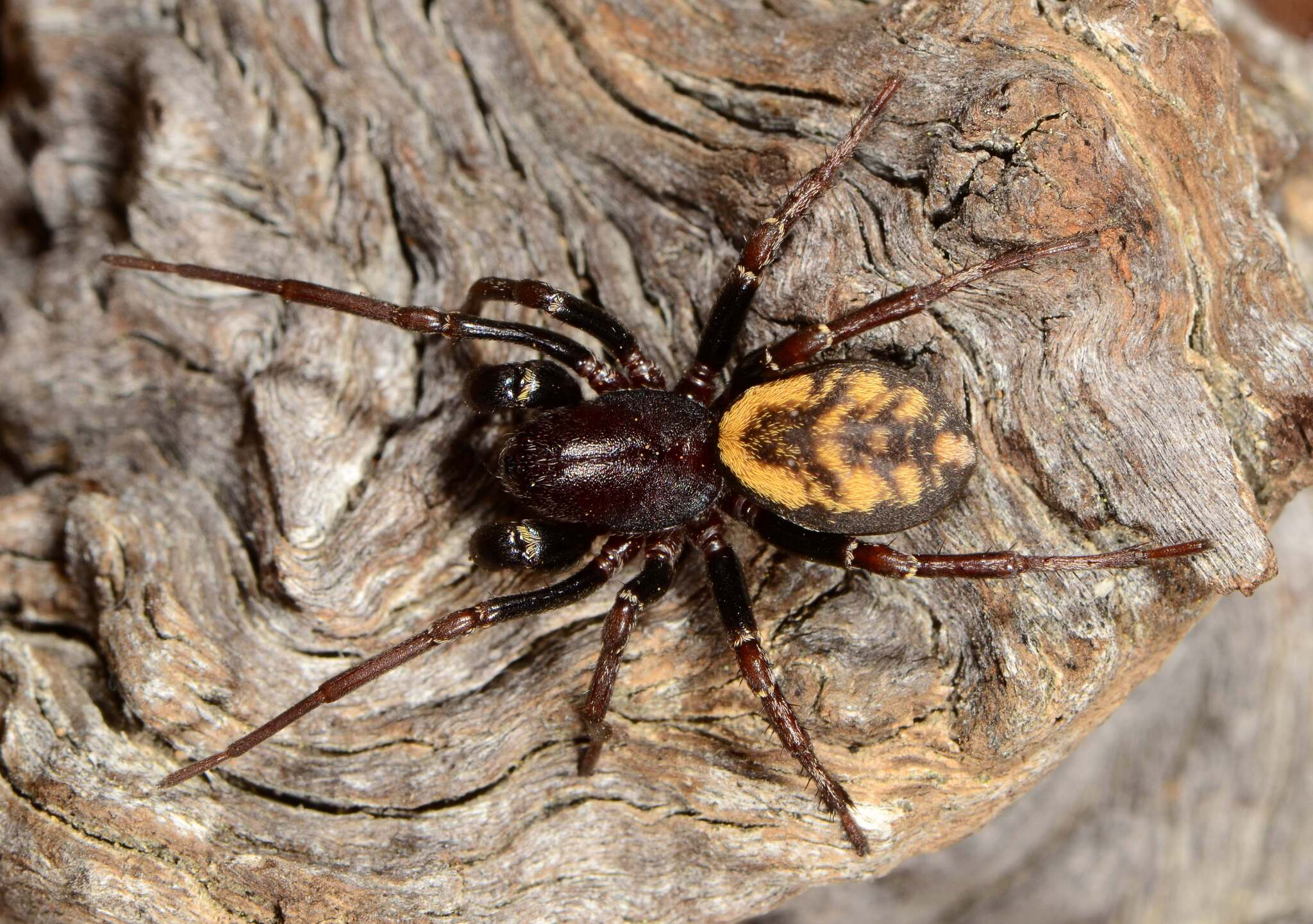
male

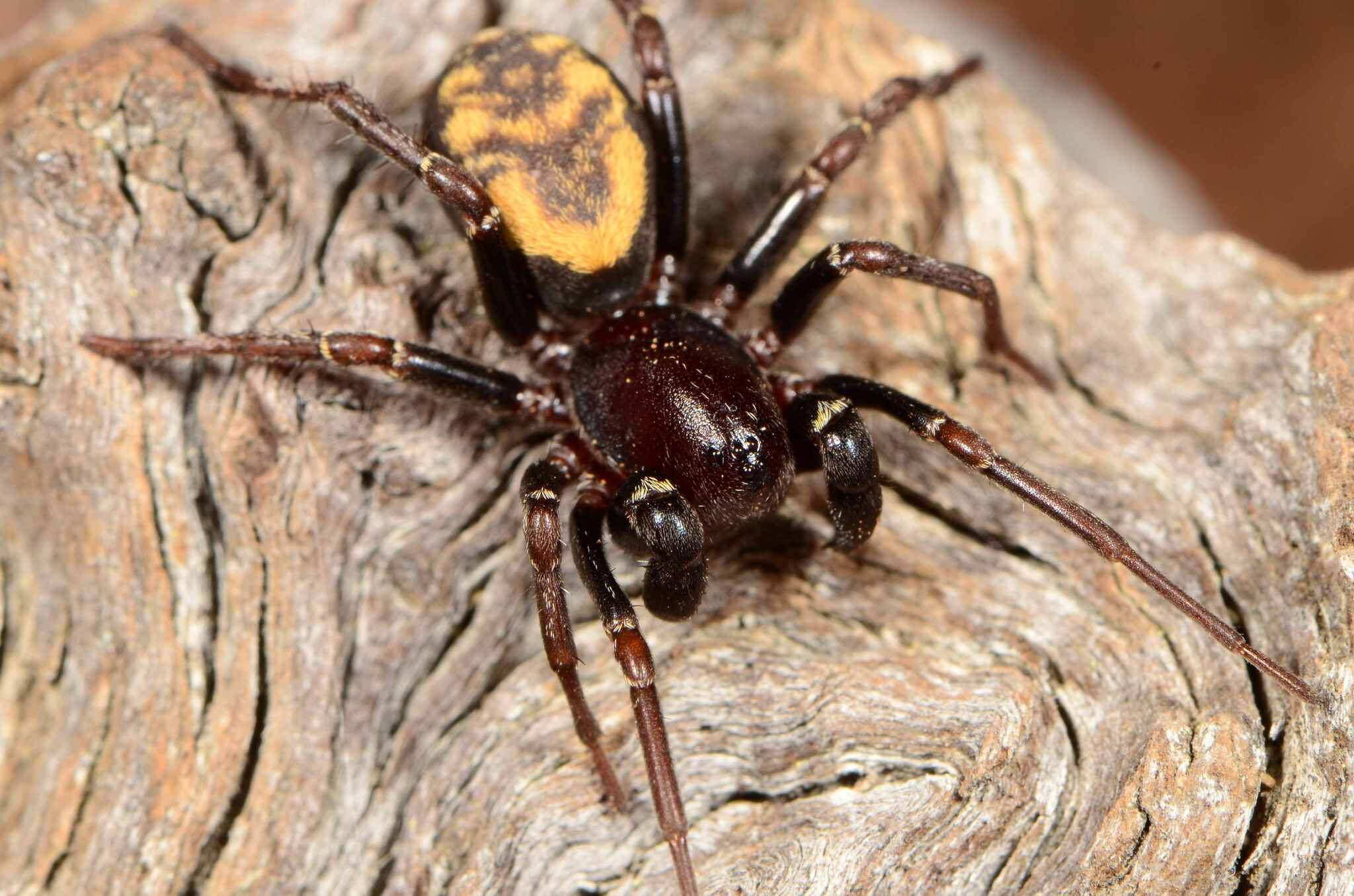
male

Both males and females are known for this species. Males have a total length of 8 mm. The carapace is medium to dark brown with many short silvery hairs. The chelicerae are reddish-brown near the tip, darkened towards the base. The legs are medium brown, and the sternum is medium brown. The opisthosoma is dark grey with a wide median stripe densely covered with white hairs. The apodemes are brownish grey.

Females have a total length of 10.2–13.5 mm. The carapace is brownish-orange with many short silvery hairs. The chelicerae and pedipalps are orange, while the legs are medium brown to orange. The sternum is orange. The opisthosoma is grey with numerous brown and yellowish-white hairs. The dorsum features two rows of irregular spots and one spot in front, as well as one in front of the spinnerets.

== Conservation ==
The species is listed as Least Concern by the South African National Biodiversity Institute due to its wide geographical range in southern Africa.
