= Cydrela spinimana =

Spotted Cydrela Burrowing Spider

Conservation status
- Least Concern (SANBI Red List)

Scientific classification
- Kingdom: Animalia
- Phylum: Arthropoda
- Subphylum: Chelicerata
- Class: Arachnida
- Order: Araneae
- Infraorder: Araneomorphae
- Family: Zodariidae
- Genus: Cydrela
- Species: C. spinimana

Binomial name
- Cydrela spinimana Pocock, 1898

Species of spider

Cydrela spinimana is a species of spider in the family Zodariidae. It is endemic to South Africa and is commonly known as the Spotted Cydrela Burrowing Spider.

== Distribution ==
Cydrela spinimana is found across three South African provinces: KwaZulu-Natal, Limpopo, and Mpumalanga. Notable localities include Estcourt, Sani Pass, uMkhuze Game Reserve, and various locations within Kruger National Park.

== Habitat ==
The species occurs at altitudes ranging from 29 to 1660 m above sea level across multiple biomes including the Indian Ocean Coastal Belt, Savanna, and Grassland. Specimens have been collected using pitfall traps.

== Description ==
Male Cydrela spinimana have a total length of 7 mm. The carapace is deep blackish-brown, while the opisthosoma is black and ornamented above with symmetrically arranged yellow spots. The femora of the legs are blackish-brown, while the patellae, tibiae, metatarsi, and tarsi are yellowish-red. The patellae, tibiae, and metatarsi, especially of the anterior pairs, have dark longitudinal stripes along the sides.

The female remains unknown.

== Conservation ==
The species is listed as Least Concern by the South African National Biodiversity Institute due to its wide geographical range. Although presently known only from males, its broad distribution justifies this classification. It is protected in six different protected areas.
