= Capheris abrupta =

Florisbad Capheris Zodariid Spider

Conservation status
- Least Concern (SANBI Red List)

Scientific classification
- Kingdom: Animalia
- Phylum: Arthropoda
- Subphylum: Chelicerata
- Class: Arachnida
- Order: Araneae
- Infraorder: Araneomorphae
- Family: Zodariidae
- Genus: Capheris
- Species: C. abrupta

Binomial name
- Capheris abrupta Jocqué, 2009

Species of spider

Capheris abrupta is a species of spider in the family Zodariidae. It is endemic to South Africa and is commonly known as the Florisbad Capheris Zodariid Spider.

== Distribution ==
Capheris abrupta is distributed across two provinces of South Africa. In the Free State, it has been recorded from Florisbad Research Station, and in the Northern Cape from localities including Kgalagadi Transfrontier Park, Lime Acres, and Waylands Pan.

== Habitat ==
The species inhabits semi-arid grassland and savanna areas within the Grassland and Savanna biomes, at elevations ranging from 988 to 1453 metres above sea level.

== Description ==
Only the male of Capheris abrupta is known to science. The carapace is granulated and dark chestnut brown with short silvery hairs mainly along cervical grooves. The chelicerae are dark brown, while the sternum is dark brownish-orange with some tiny paler spots where hinged hairs are inserted. The legs are medium brown. The opisthosoma is dark grey or yellow with numerous brown hairs and a wide median stripe densely covered with white hairs overlaying a pattern of darker spots on a pale background. The apodemes are very pale.

== Ecology ==
Capheris abrupta was found together with Camponotus ants, which their colouration resembles, featuring a black carapace and yellow abdomen. This suggests that these spiders may mimic and possibly feed on these ants.

== Conservation ==
The species is listed as Least Concern by the South African National Biodiversity Institute. Although known only from males, it has a sufficiently wide distribution to warrant this conservation status. The species is currently protected within Kgalagadi Transfrontier Park.
