= Tetradactylus fitzsimonsi =

Conservation status
- Least Concern (IUCN 3.1)

Scientific classification
- Kingdom: Animalia
- Phylum: Chordata
- Class: Reptilia
- Order: Squamata
- Family: Gerrhosauridae
- Genus: Tetradactylus
- Species: T. fitzsimonsi

Binomial name
- Tetradactylus fitzsimonsi Hewitt, 1915
- IUCN range Extant (resident)

Synonyms
- Tetradactylus fitzsimonsi Hewitt, 2015; Tetradactylus africanus fitzsimonsi — V. FitzSimons, 1943; Tetradactylus fitzsimonsi — Bates et al., 2014

Species of lizard

Tetradactylus fitzsimonsi, commonly known as Fitzsimons' long-tailed seps and FitzSimons' whip lizard, is a species of lizard in the family Gerrhosauridae. The species is endemic to South Africa.

== Etymology ==
The specific name, fitzsimonsi, is in honour of Irish-born South African herpetologist Frederick William FitzSimons.

== Habitat ==
The preferred natural habitats of T. fitzsimonsi are grassland and shrubland.

== Description ==
T. fitzsimonsi has no front legs. Its hind legs are minute, with only one toe on each foot. Adults may attain a snout-to-vent length (SVL) of about 8 cm (3.1 in) and a total length (including a long tail) of about 34 cm (13 in).

== Reproduction ==
T. fitzsimonsi is oviparous. A clutch of 2–5 eggs is laid in a live ant nest (Anochetus faurei). Communal nesting has been observed. Each egg measures about 1.5 cm × 1.0 cm (0.59 in × 0.39 in). Each hatchling has a total length (including tail) of about 12.5 cm (4.9 in).
