= Tetradactylus africanus =

Conservation status
- Least Concern (IUCN 3.1)

Scientific classification
- Kingdom: Animalia
- Phylum: Chordata
- Class: Reptilia
- Order: Squamata
- Family: Gerrhosauridae
- Genus: Tetradactylus
- Species: T. africanus

Binomial name
- Tetradactylus africanus JE Gray, 1838

Species of lizard

Tetradactylus africanus, commonly known as the eastern long-tailed seps or African whip lizard, is a species of lizard in the family Gerrhosauridae. The species is found in South Africa and Eswatini.
