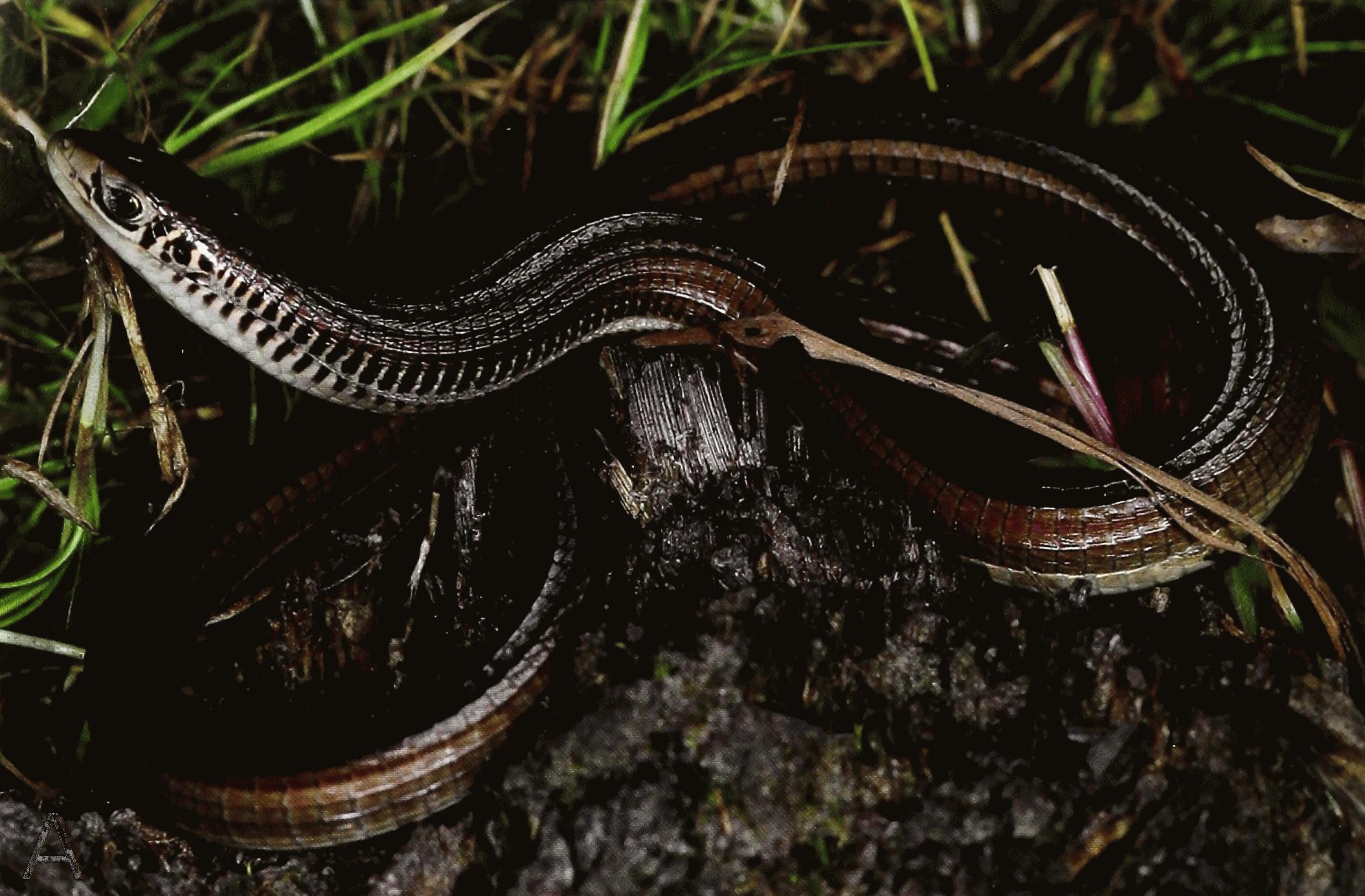

Conservation status
- Least Concern (IUCN 3.1)

Scientific classification
- Kingdom: Animalia
- Phylum: Chordata
- Class: Reptilia
- Order: Squamata
- Family: Gerrhosauridae
- Genus: Tetradactylus
- Species: T. ellenbergeri

Binomial name
- Tetradactylus ellenbergeri (Angel, 1922)

Synonyms
- Paratetradactylus ellenbergeri Angel, 1922; Tetradactylus boulengeri de Witte, 1933; Tetradactylus lundensis Monard, 1937; Tedradactylus [sic] fitzsimonsi simplex Laurent, 1950; Tetradactylus ellenbergeri — Broadley, 1971

= Tetradactylus ellenbergeri =

Species of lizard

Tetradactylus ellenbergeri, commonly known as Ellen's whip lizard and Ellenberger's long-tailed seps, is a species of lizard in the family Gerrhosauridae. The species is indigenous to Africa.

== Etymology ==
The specific name, ellenbergeri, is in honor of Victor Ellenberger (1879–1972), who was an African-born Swiss missionary and naturalist.

== Geographic range ==
T. ellenbergeri is found in Angola, Democratic Republic of the Congo, Tanzania, and Zambia.

== Habitat ==
The preferred natural habitats of T. ellenbergeri are savanna and grassland.

== Description ==
T. ellenbergeri is a snake-like lizard. Its front legs are absent, and its back legs are reduced to minute spikes about 2 mm long. The tail is extremely long, more than three times the snout-to-vent length (SVL).

== Behavior ==
T. ellenbergeri is terrestrial and diurnal.

== Diet ==
T. ellenbergeri preys upon insects and other invertebrates.

== Reproduction ==
T. ellenbergeri is oviparous.
