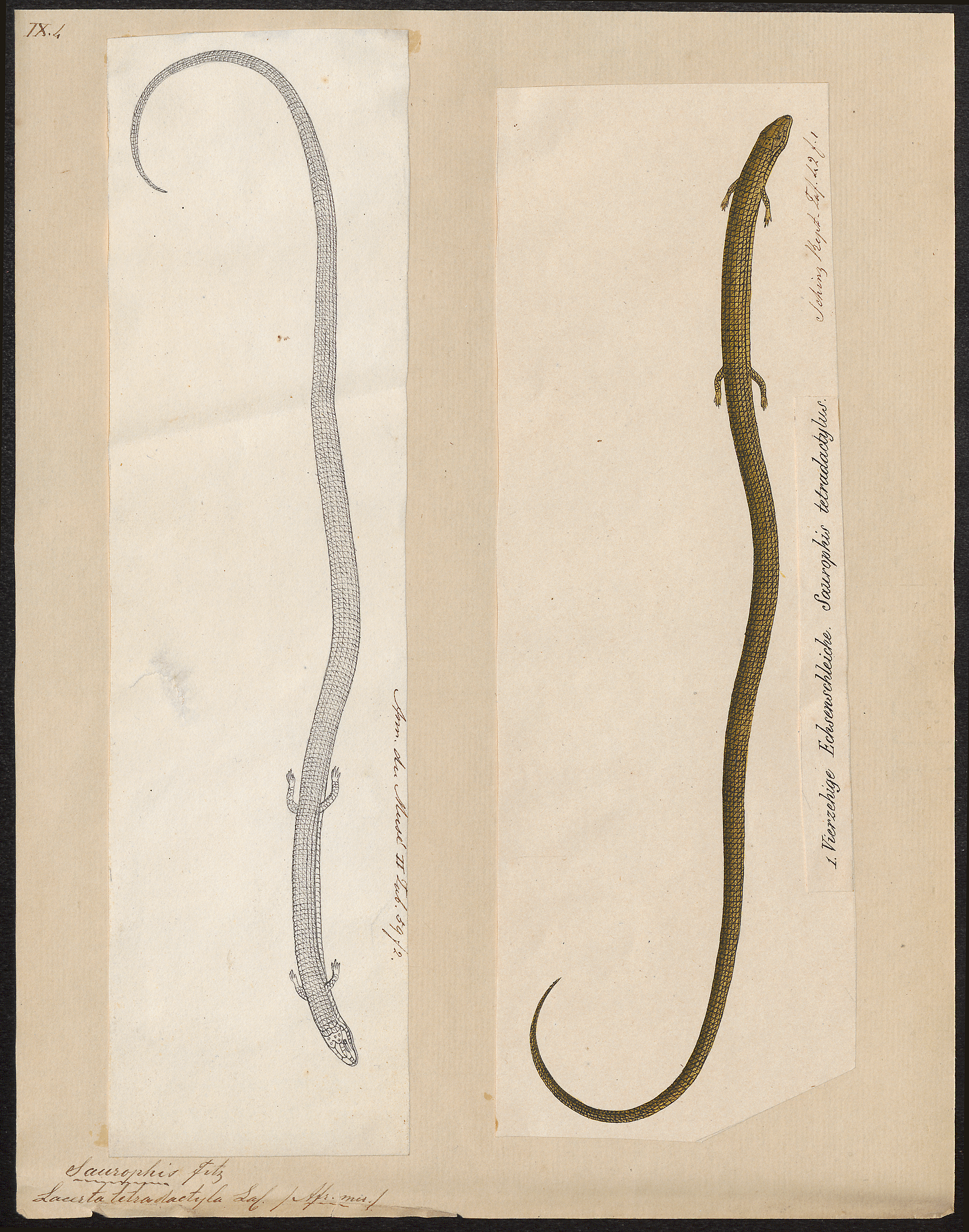
- Illustration of Lacerta tetradactyla

Conservation status
- Least Concern (IUCN 3.1)

Scientific classification
- Kingdom: Animalia
- Phylum: Chordata
- Class: Reptilia
- Order: Squamata
- Family: Gerrhosauridae
- Genus: Tetradactylus
- Species: T. tetradactylus

Binomial name
- Tetradactylus tetradactylus (Daudin, 1802)

= Tetradactylus tetradactylus =

Species of lizard

Tetradactylus tetradactylus, commonly known as the Cape long-tailed seps or longtail whip lizard, is a species of lizard in the family Gerrhosauridae. The species is found in South Africa.
