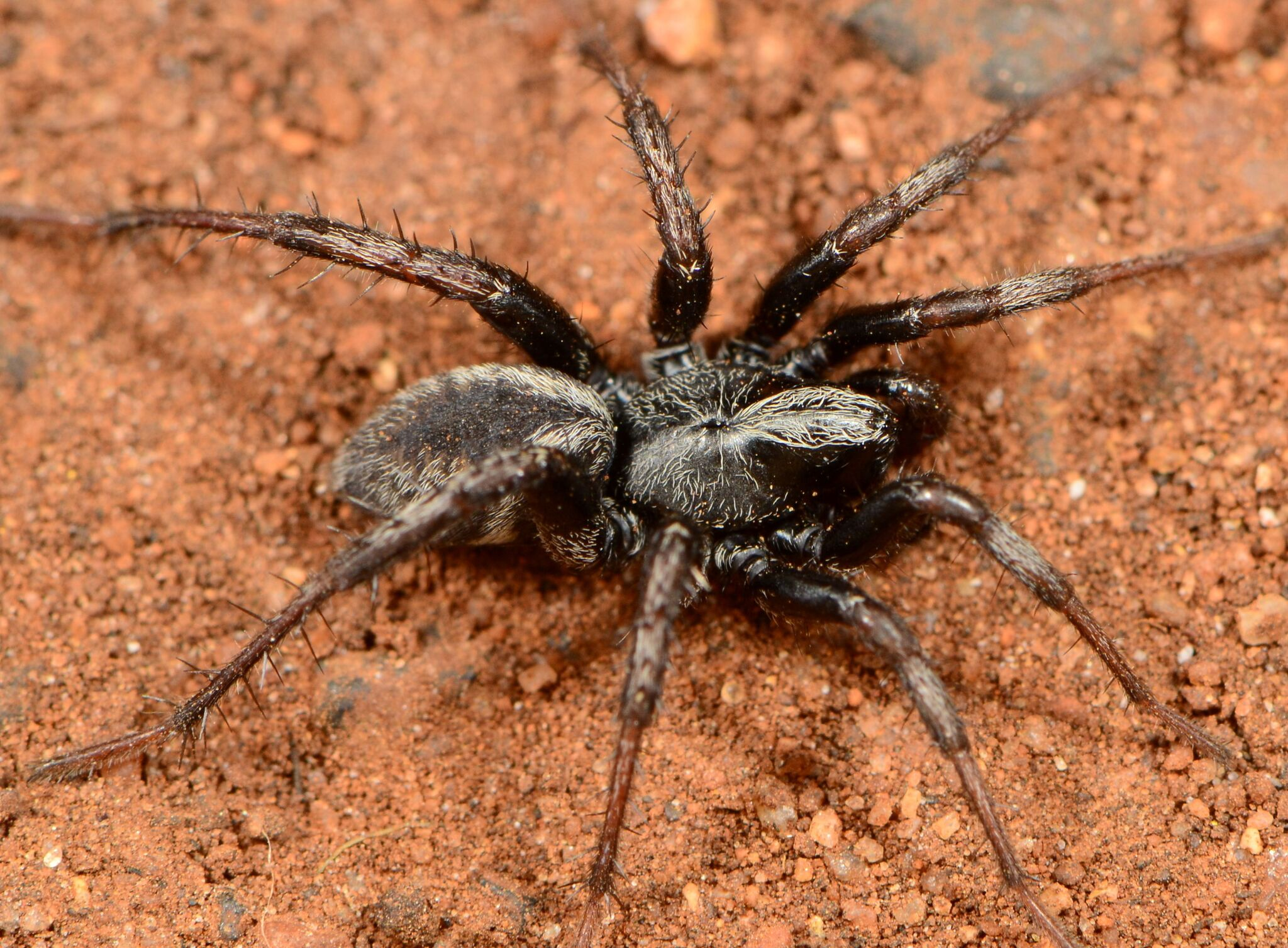
- Male
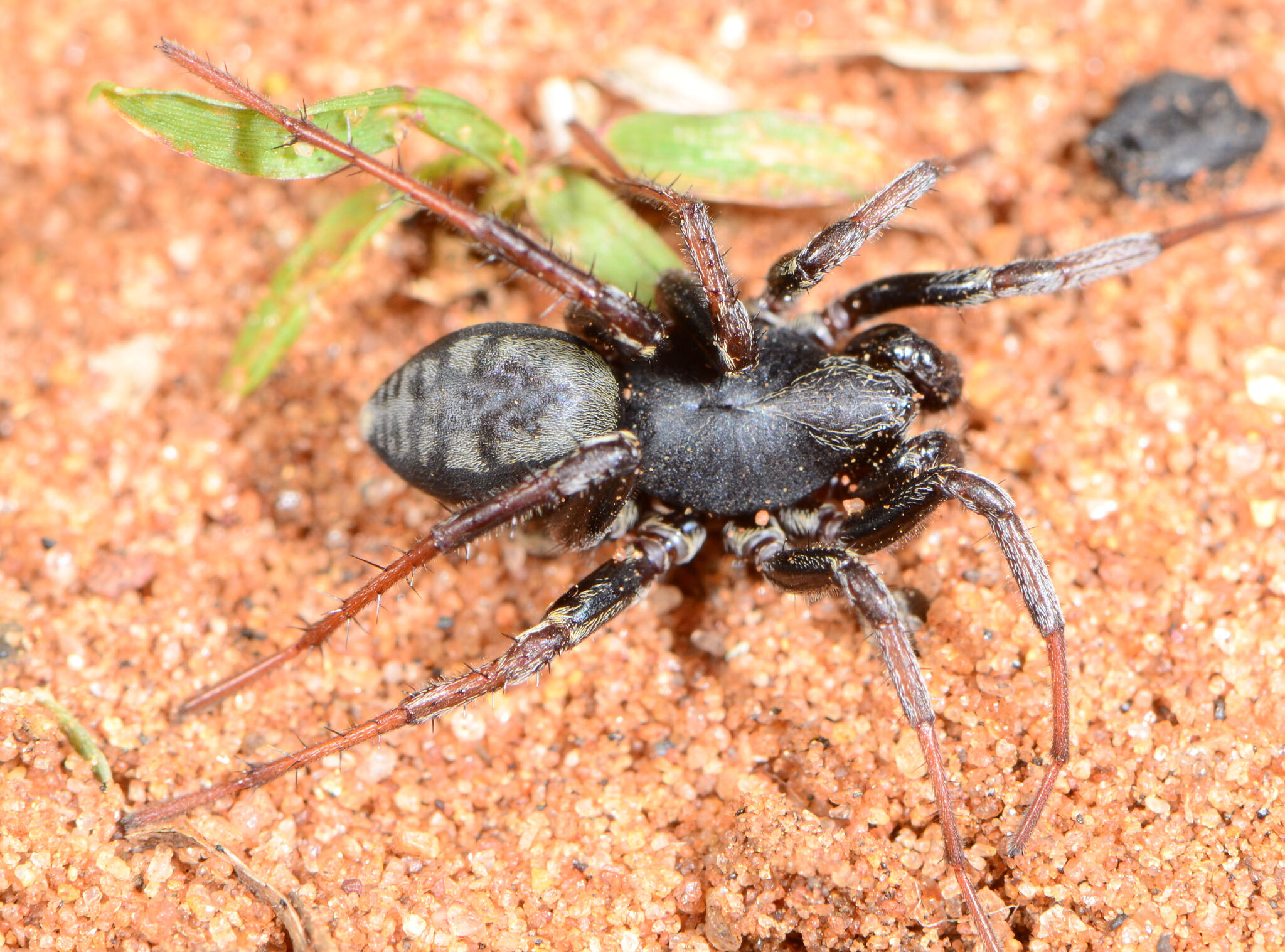
- Male

Scientific classification
- Kingdom: Animalia
- Phylum: Arthropoda
- Subphylum: Chelicerata
- Class: Arachnida
- Order: Araneae
- Infraorder: Araneomorphae
- Family: Zodariidae
- Genus: Cydrela
- Species: C. schoemanae

Binomial name
- Cydrela schoemanae Jocqué, 1991

= Cydrela schoemanae =

Schoeman's Cydrela Burrowing spider

Species of spider

Cydrela schoemanae is a species of spider in the family Zodariidae. It is endemic to South Africa and is commonly known as Schoeman's Cydrela Burrowing spider.

== Distribution ==
Cydrela schoemanae has a widespread distribution across three South African provinces: Gauteng, Limpopo, and Mpumalanga. Notable localities include Kruger National Park, Sabie, Nelspruit, and various nature reserves.

== Habitat ==
The species occurs at altitudes ranging from 104 to 1647 m above sea level in the Grassland and Savanna biomes. It has been collected in pitfall traps and has also been found in maize and pine plantations.

== Description ==
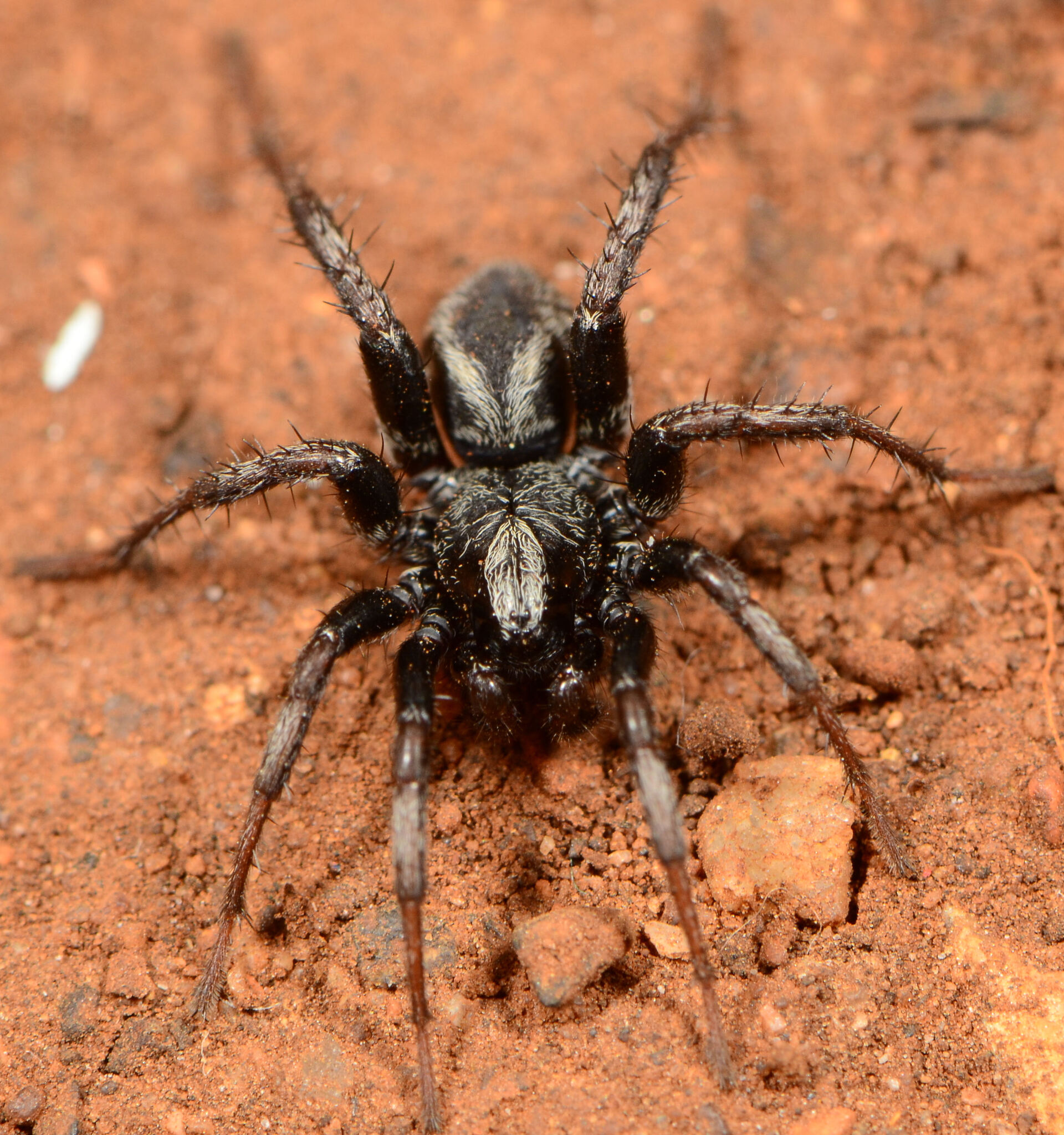
male

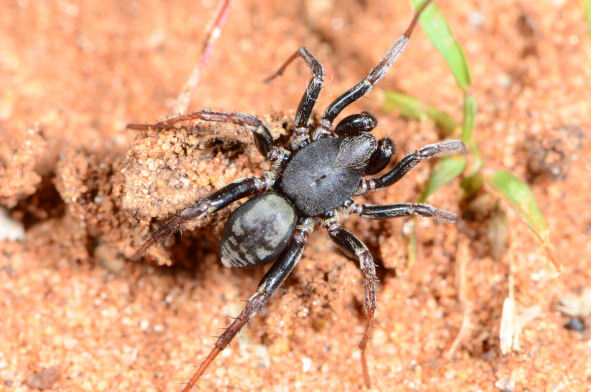
male

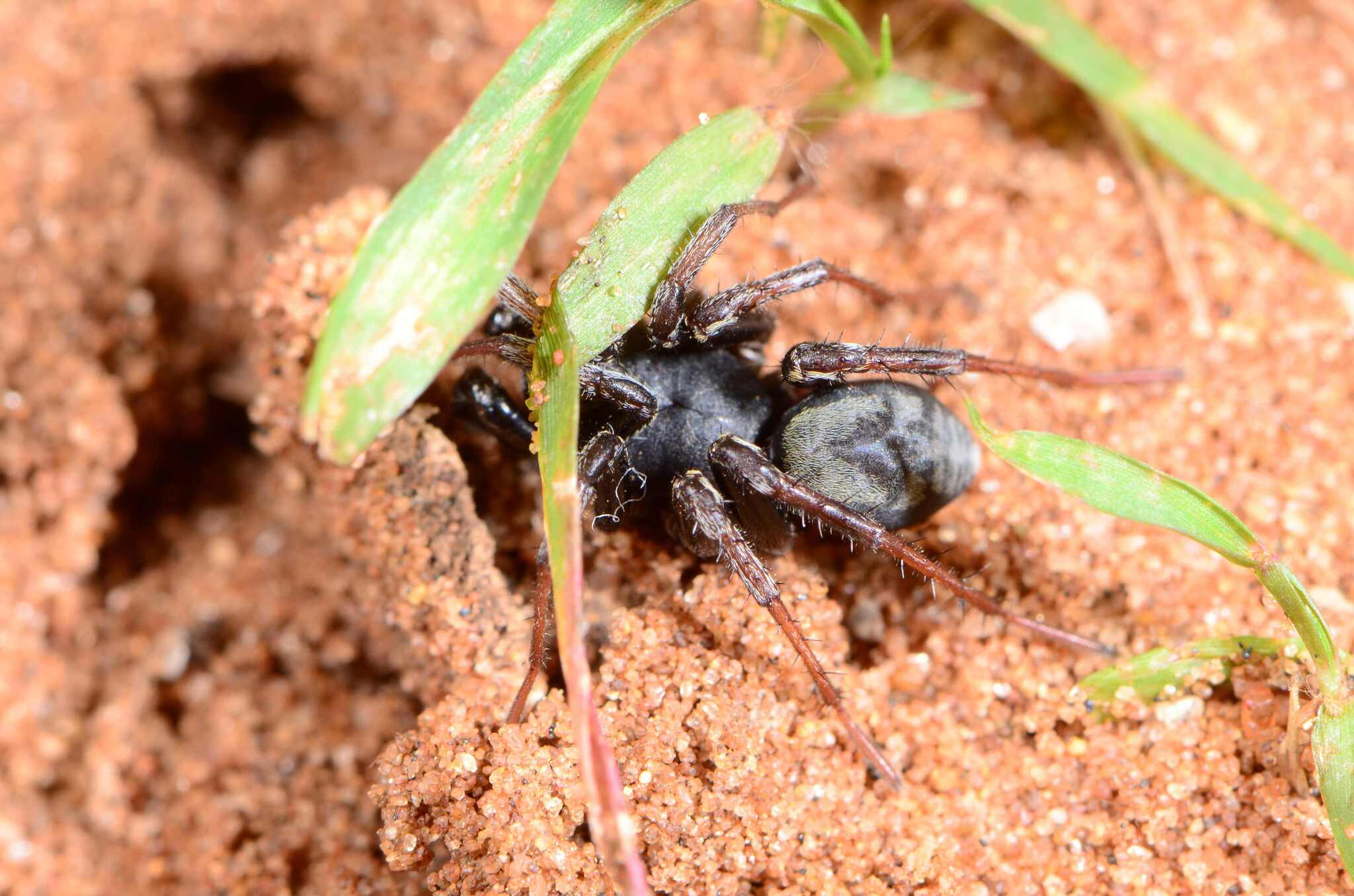
male

Cydrela schoemanae has a uniform dark brown carapace, with medium brown chelicerae and sternum. The legs are medium brown with darker femora. The opisthosoma is dark grey with five distinctive white markings: two in front, two in the middle, and one longitudinal interrupted bar in front of the spinnerets. The carapace surface is rugose. Females show similar coloration to males but have a butterfly-shaped patch in front of the fovea on the carapace.

== Conservation ==
The species is listed as Least Concern by the South African National Biodiversity Institute due to its wide geographical range. It is protected in six different protected areas including Kruger National Park and various nature reserves.
