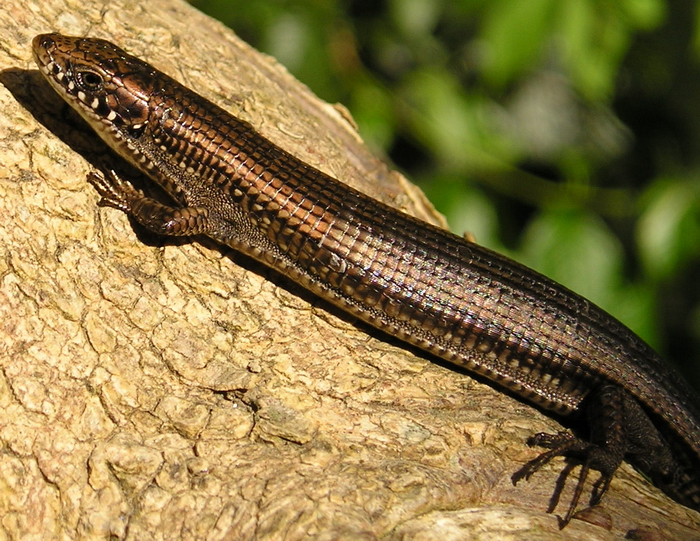
- Tetradactylus seps

Scientific classification
- Kingdom: Animalia
- Phylum: Chordata
- Class: Reptilia
- Order: Squamata
- Family: Gerrhosauridae
- Subfamily: Gerrhosaurinae
- Genus: Tetradactylus; Merrem, 1820

= Tetradactylus =

Genus of lizards

Tetradactylus is a genus of lizards in the family Gerrhosauridae. The genus is endemic to Africa.

== Species ==
The genus Tetradactylus contains the following species which are recognized as being valid.

- Tetradactylus africanus Gray, 1838 – African long-tailed seps
- Tetradactylus breyeri Roux, 1907 – Breyer's long-tailed seps, vulnerable (VU)
- Tetradactylus eastwoodae Hewitt & Methuen, 1913 – Eastwood's long-tailed seps, extinct (EX)
- Tetradactylus ellenbergeri (Angel, 1922) – Ellenberger's long-tailed seps
- Tetradactylus fitzsimonsi (Hewitt, 1915) – Fitzsimons's long-tailed seps
- Tetradactylus seps (Linnaeus, 1758) – short-legged seps
- Tetradactylus tetradactylus (Daudin, 1802) – long-toed seps
- Tetradactylus udzungwensis Salvidio, Menegon, Sindaco & Moyer, 2004 – Udzungwa long-tailed seps

Nota bene: A binomial authority in parentheses indicates that the species was originally named in a genus other than Tetradactylus.
