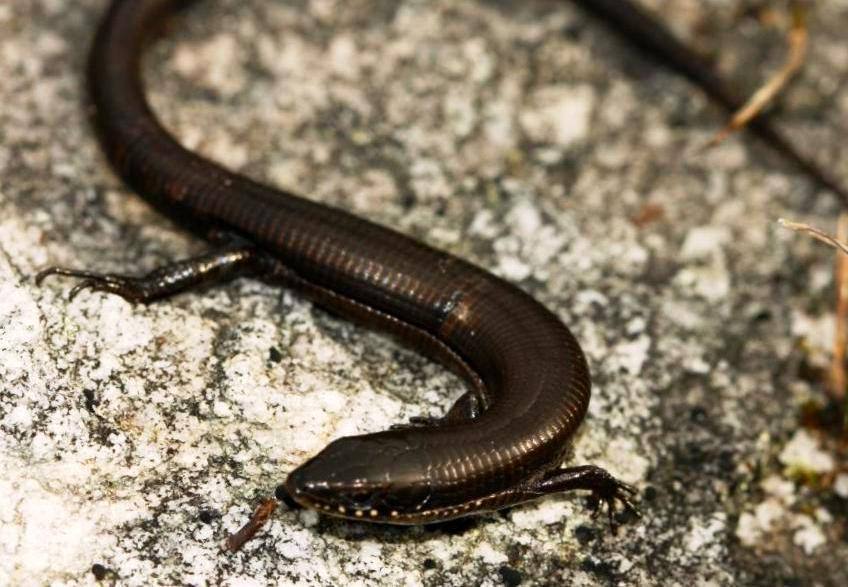

Conservation status
- Least Concern (IUCN 3.1)

Scientific classification
- Kingdom: Animalia
- Phylum: Chordata
- Class: Reptilia
- Order: Squamata
- Family: Gerrhosauridae
- Genus: Tetradactylus
- Species: T. seps

Binomial name
- Tetradactylus seps (Linnaeus, 1758)

= Tetradactylus seps =

Species of lizard

Tetradactylus seps, commonly known as the short-legged seps or five-toed whip lizard, is a species of lizard in the family Gerrhosauridae. The species is found in South Africa.
