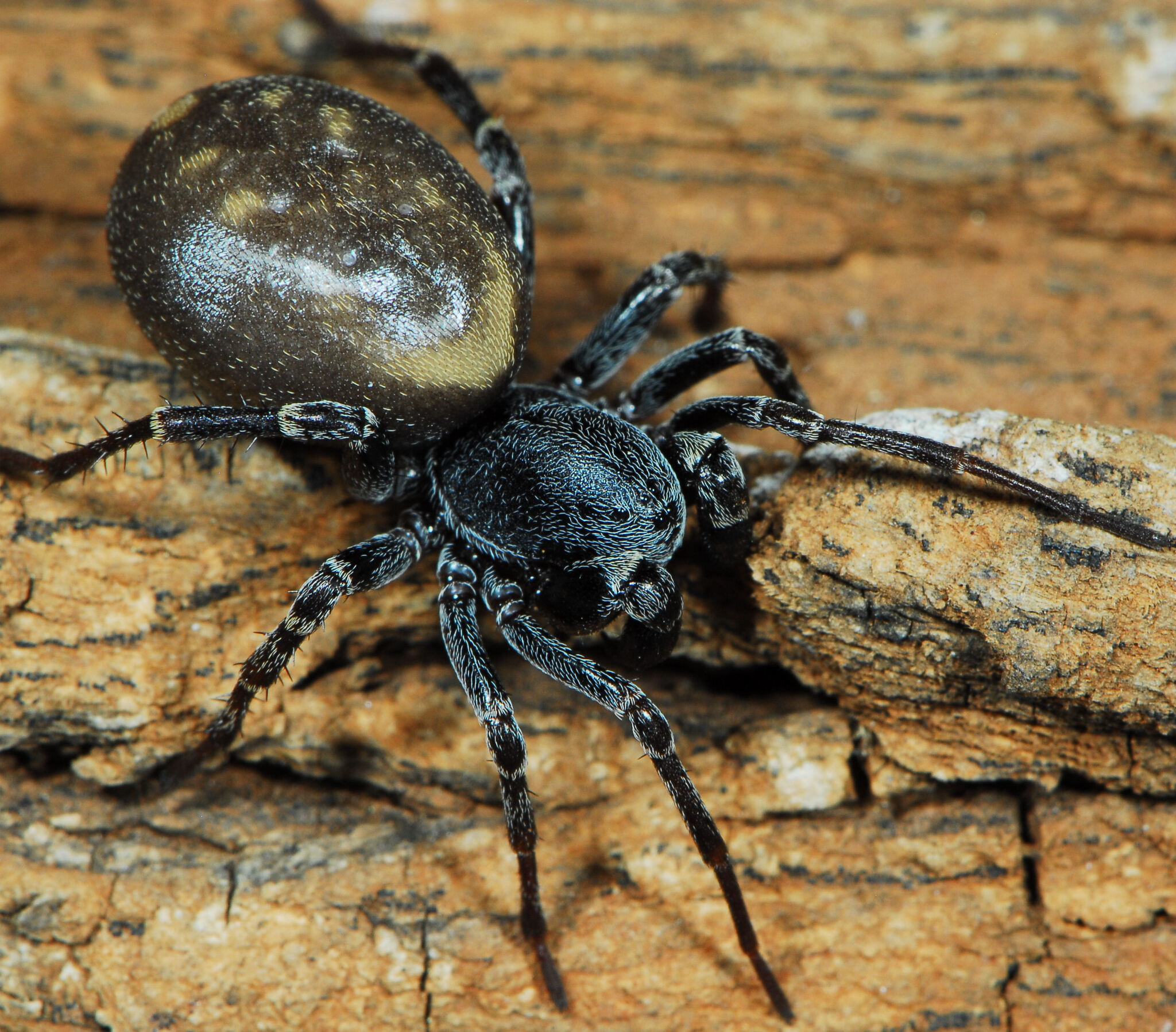
- Female
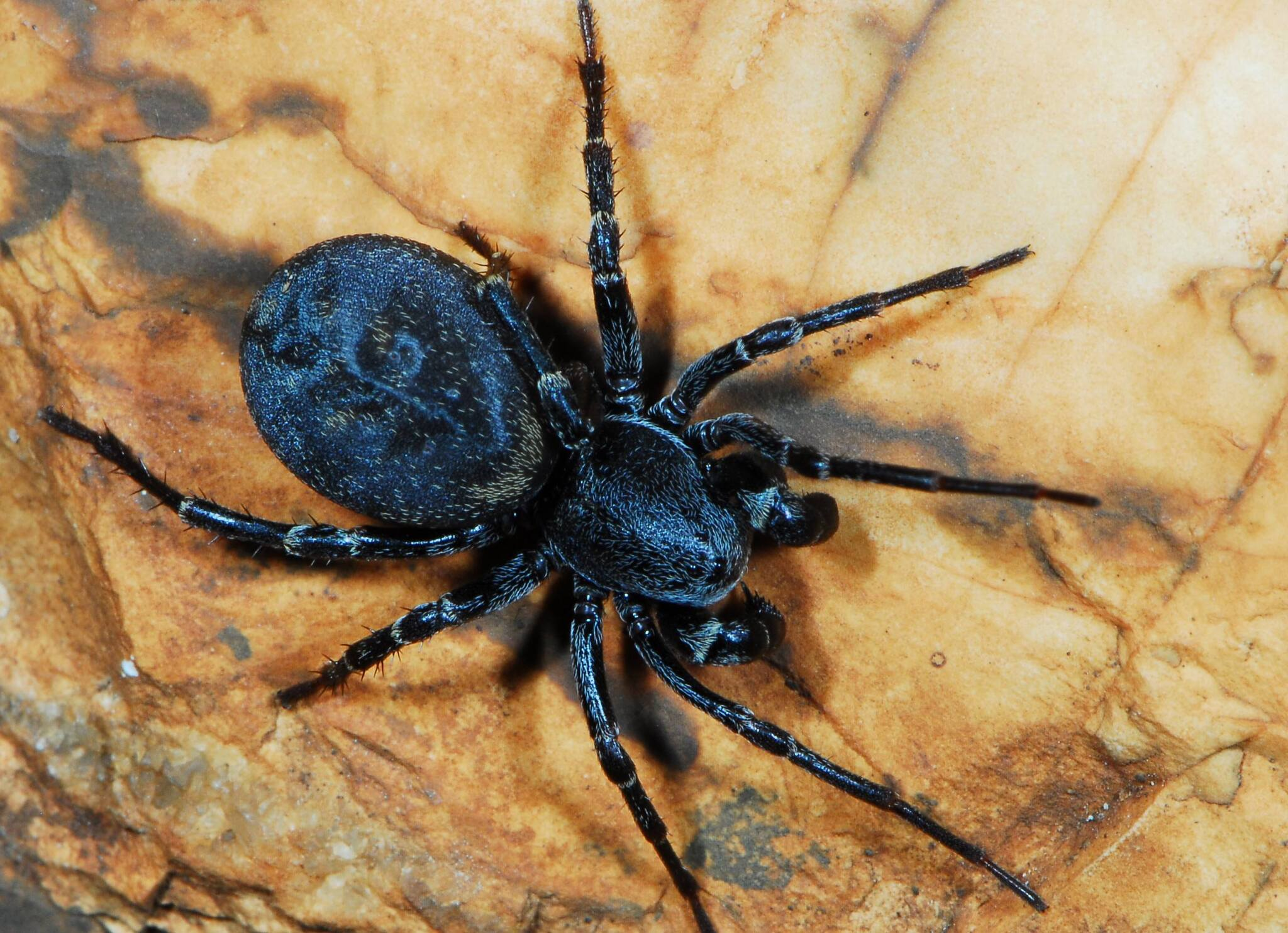
- Male

Scientific classification
- Kingdom: Animalia
- Phylum: Arthropoda
- Subphylum: Chelicerata
- Class: Arachnida
- Order: Araneae
- Infraorder: Araneomorphae
- Family: Zodariidae
- Genus: Capheris
- Species: C. decorata

Binomial name
- Capheris decorata Simon, 1904

Synonyms
- Capheris transvaalicus Hewitt, 1915

= Capheris decorata =

Waterberg Capheris Zodariid spider

Species of spider

Capheris decorata is a species of spider in the family Zodariidae. It is widely distributed across southern and eastern Africa and is commonly known as the Waterberg Capheris Zodariid spider.

== Distribution ==
Capheris decorata occurs in five African countries: Botswana, Zambia, Zimbabwe, Mozambique, and South Africa. In South Africa, it has been recorded from seven provinces at elevations ranging from 42 to 1467 m above sea level, making it one of the most widespread Capheris species in the country.

== Habitat ==
The species is a burrow-dwelling spider found across multiple biomes including Grassland, Forest, Savanna, Fynbos, and Succulent Karoo. Specimens are typically collected using pitfall traps.

== Description ==
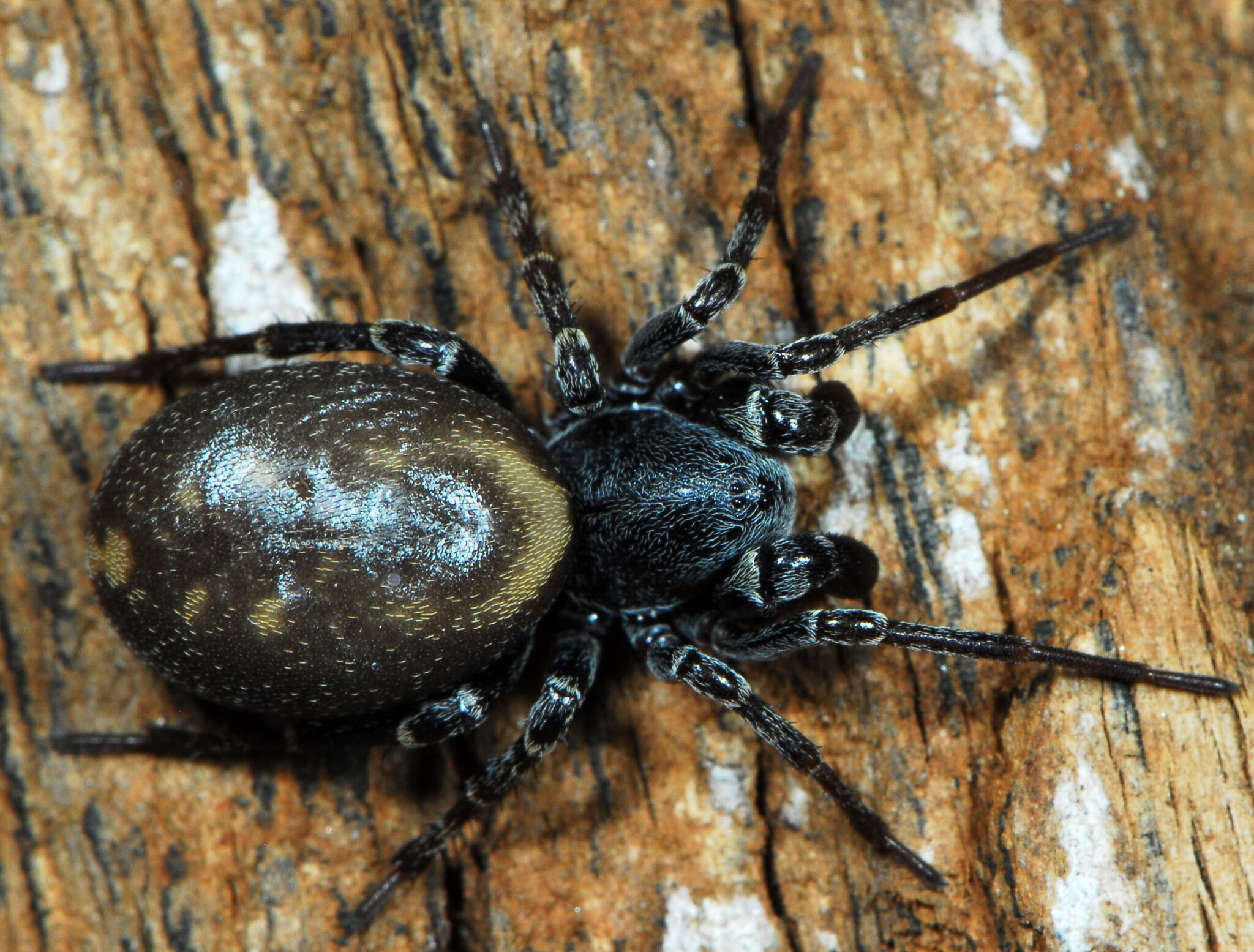
female

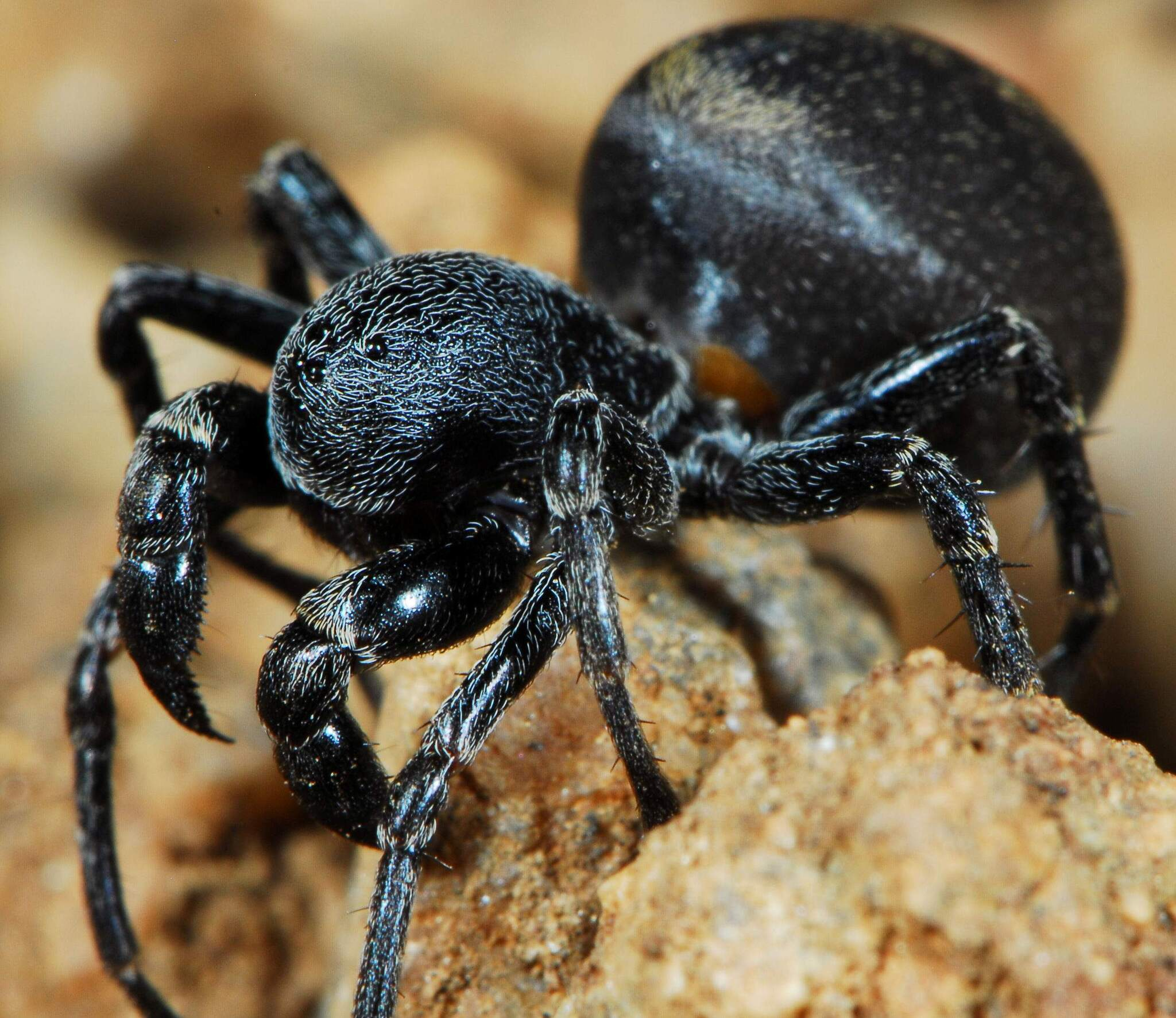
male

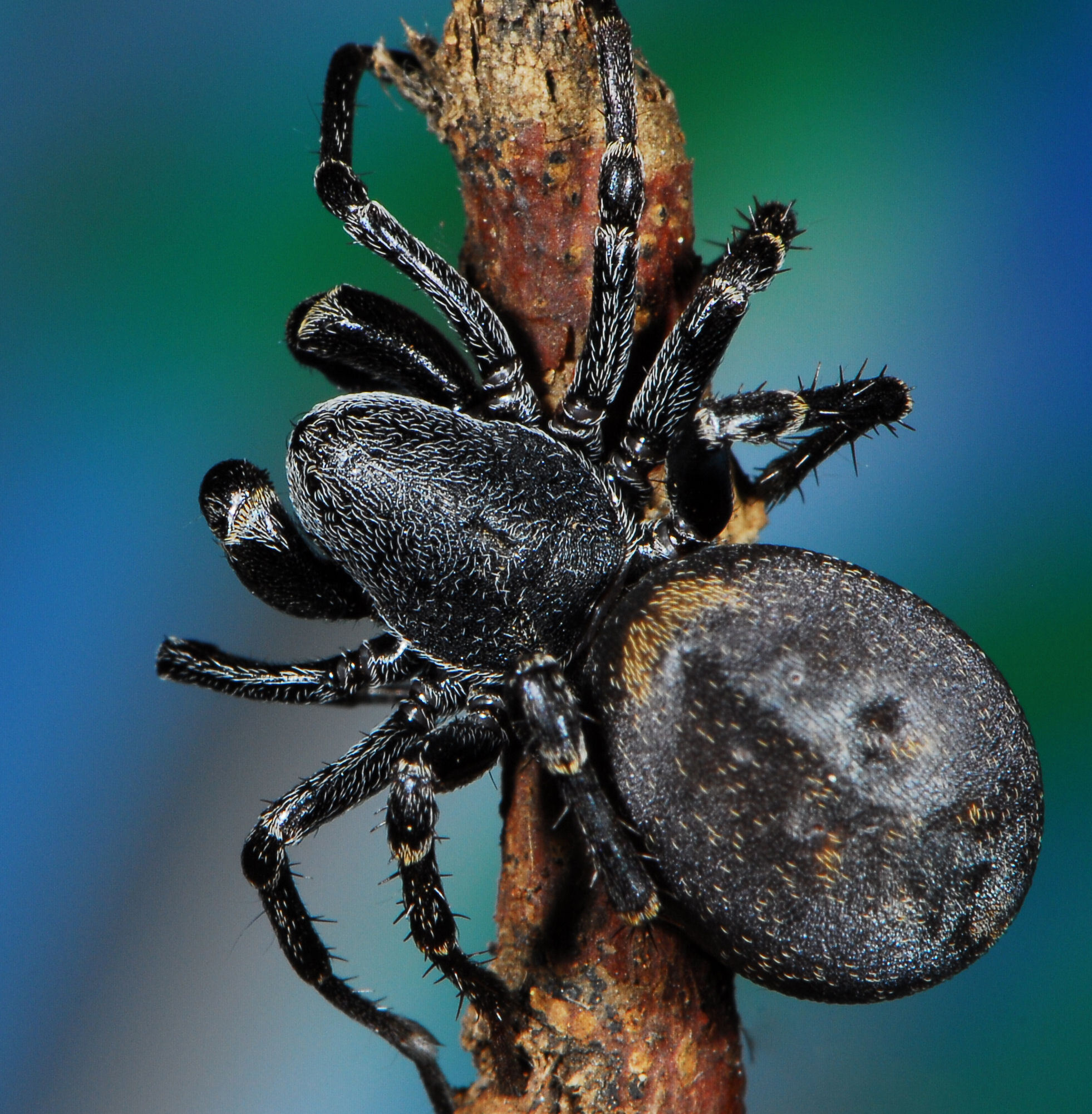
male

Both males and females are known for this species. The carapace is uniform dark reddish-brown with sparse short silvery hairs and roughly reticulated surface texture. The sternum is dark orange with a well-defined boss near the posterior point. The chelicerae are dark reddish-brown, becoming paler towards the distal ends. The legs are medium brown with darker femora, and the pedipalps are dark brown. The opisthosoma is grey with a few faint pale spots, including a slightly more marked kidney-shaped spot in front. The apodemes are greyish-brown.

== Conservation ==
The species is listed as Least Concern by the South African National Biodiversity Institute due to its wide geographical range across multiple countries and provinces. It is conserved in more than 10 protected areas throughout its range.
