= Eastwood's long-tailed seps =

Eastwood's longtailed seps

Conservation status
- Extinct (IUCN 3.1)

Scientific classification
- Kingdom: Animalia
- Phylum: Chordata
- Class: Reptilia
- Order: Squamata
- Family: Gerrhosauridae
- Genus: Tetradactylus
- Species: †T. eastwoodae

Binomial name
- †Tetradactylus eastwoodae Hewitt & Methuen, 1913

Species of lizard

Eastwood's longtailed seps (Tetradactylus eastwoodae), also known commonly as Eastwood's whip lizard was a species of lizard in the family Gerrhosauridae. The species was endemic to South Africa. Its natural habitat was subtropical or tropical high-altitude grassland. It became extinct due to habitat loss.

== Etymology ==
The specific name, eastwoodae, is in honor of Miss A. Eastwood who collected the holotype.

== Description ==
T. eastwoodae was snake-like, with very small legs. Each front leg had only three toes, and each back leg had only two toes.

== Reproduction ==
T. eastwoodae was oviparous.

== Extinction ==
The type locality for T. eastwoodae is the Haenertsburg area near Woodbush in the Letaba district approximately 5 km (3.1 mi) West of where the Magoebaskloof hotel now is, where two specimens were found during the early 20th century around 1911. Subsequently, the area has been intensively planted to Eucalyptus and Pinus tree species for commercial use, and the grasslands where this species once occurred have now been eradicated. Searches in remaining grasslands have not been able to establish that any living specimens remain, and since no specimens since 1911 have been found, it is now considered extinct.
