= Gary Lynch (neuroscientist) =

Gary Lynch is a neuroscientist at University of California, Irvine School of Medicine. His lab studies memory. He received his PhD from Princeton University in 1968; his PhD advisor was Bryon Campbell. At UCI, his lab began research involving the role of long-term potentiation in memory. His biography is profiled in the book 101 Theory Drive.
