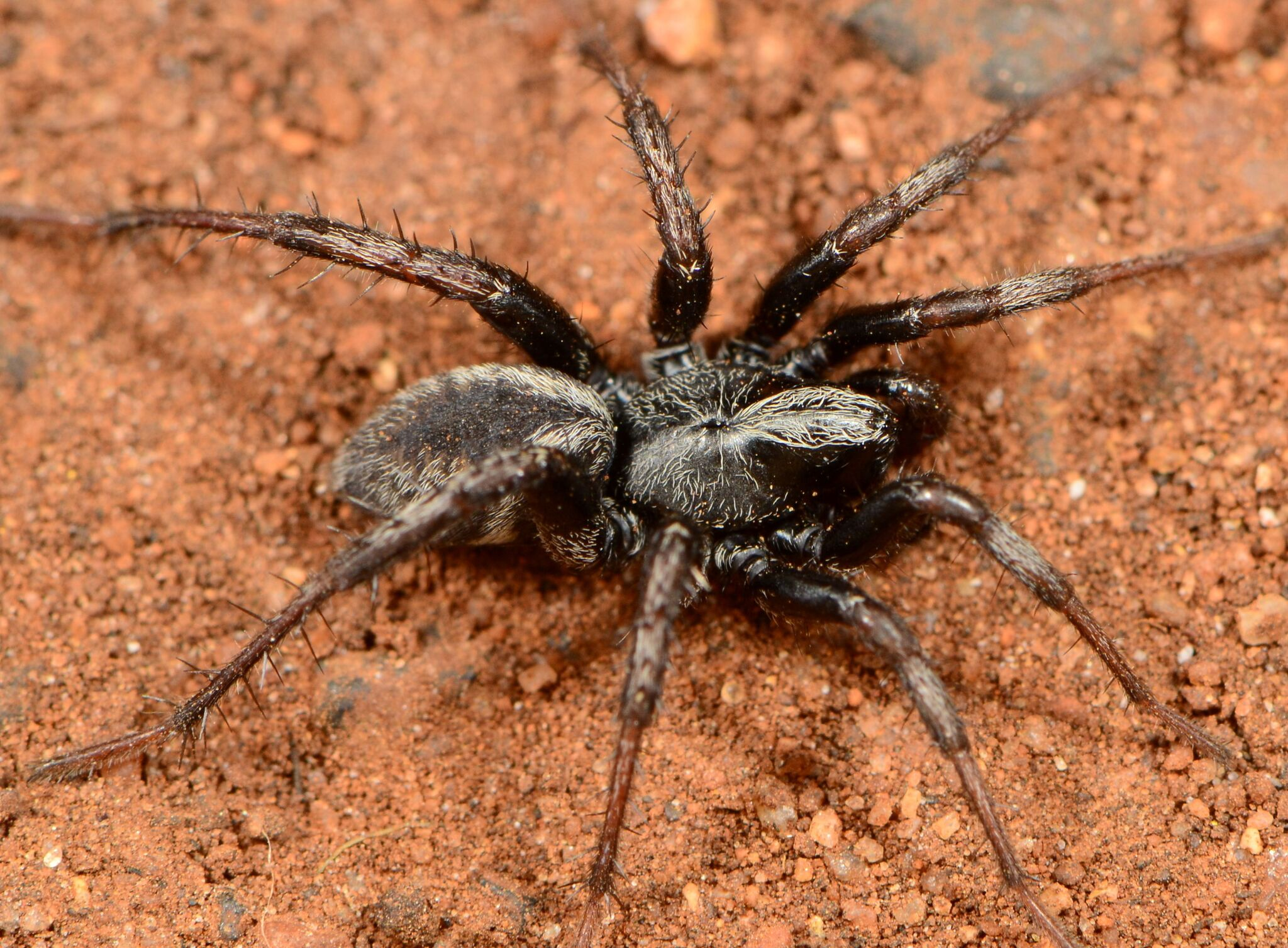
- Male C. schoemanae
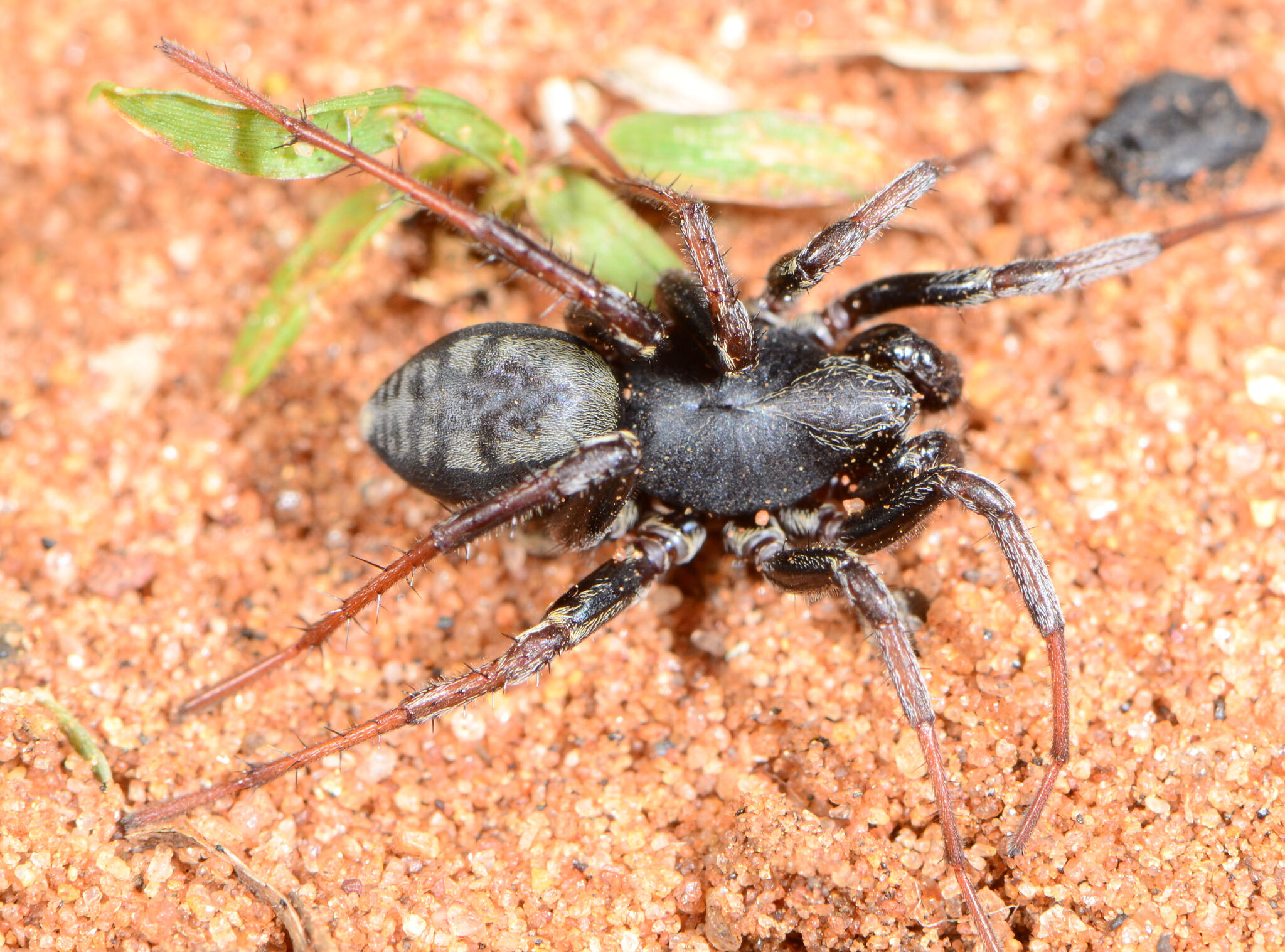
- Male C. schoemanae

Scientific classification
- Kingdom: Animalia
- Phylum: Arthropoda
- Subphylum: Chelicerata
- Class: Arachnida
- Order: Araneae
- Infraorder: Araneomorphae
- Family: Zodariidae
- Genus: Cydrela; Thorell, 1873

Type species
- Cydrela unguiculata

Species
- 15, see text

= Cydrela =

Genus of spiders

Cydrela is a genus of spiders in the family Zodariidae. It was first described in 1873 by Tamerlan Thorell.

Most of its species are found in Africa, with four described species from Thailand to China. C. insularis is endemic to Socotra.

== Species ==
As of September 2025, this genus includes fifteen species:

- Cydrela albopilosa Simon & Fage, 1922 – Kenya
- Cydrela decidua Dankittipakul & Jocqué, 2006 – Thailand
- Cydrela friedlanderae Hewitt, 1914 – South Africa
- Cydrela insularis (Pocock, 1899) – Yemen (Socotra)
- Cydrela kenti Lessert, 1933 – Angola
- Cydrela likui Lin & Li, 2023 – Vietnam
- Cydrela linzhiensis (Hu, 2001) – China
- Cydrela nasuta Lessert, 1936 – Mozambique
- Cydrela otavensis Lawrence, 1928 – Namibia
- Cydrela pristina Dankittipakul & Jocqué, 2006 – Thailand
- Cydrela schoemanae Jocqué, 1991 – South Africa
- Cydrela spinifrons Hewitt, 1915 – South Africa
- Cydrela spinimana Pocock, 1898 – South Africa
- Cydrela stigmatica (Simon, 1876) – Tanzania (Zanzibar)
- Cydrela unguiculata (O. Pickard-Cambridge, 1871) – South Africa (type species)
