= William Plane Pycraft =

English osteologist and zoologist

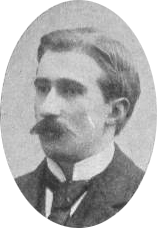
W. P. Pycraft, ca. 1909

William Plane Pycraft (13 January 1868 – 1 May 1942) was an English osteologist and zoologist.

Pycraft was born on 13 January 1868 in Great Yarmouth in Norfolk the elder son of William John Pycraft and Margaret Fiddes Pycraft (née Blake). His father was in the Merchant Navy and drowned at Llanelli on 14 August 1868 when William was only 8 months old. His mother remarried Clement Watson, a Butcher on 14 January 1872 in Great Yarmouth, Norfolk. In 1891 Pycraft was a Museum Assistant to Montague Browne, the Curator of the Town Museum in Leicester. In 1892 Pycraft became assistant to Edwin Ray Lankester, and in 1898 moved with Lankester to the staff of the Natural History Museum. He married Lucy Agnes Shee, daughter of Jeremiah Dunlay Shee in 1899 in Chelsea. In 1907 Pycraft took charge of osteology at the museum.

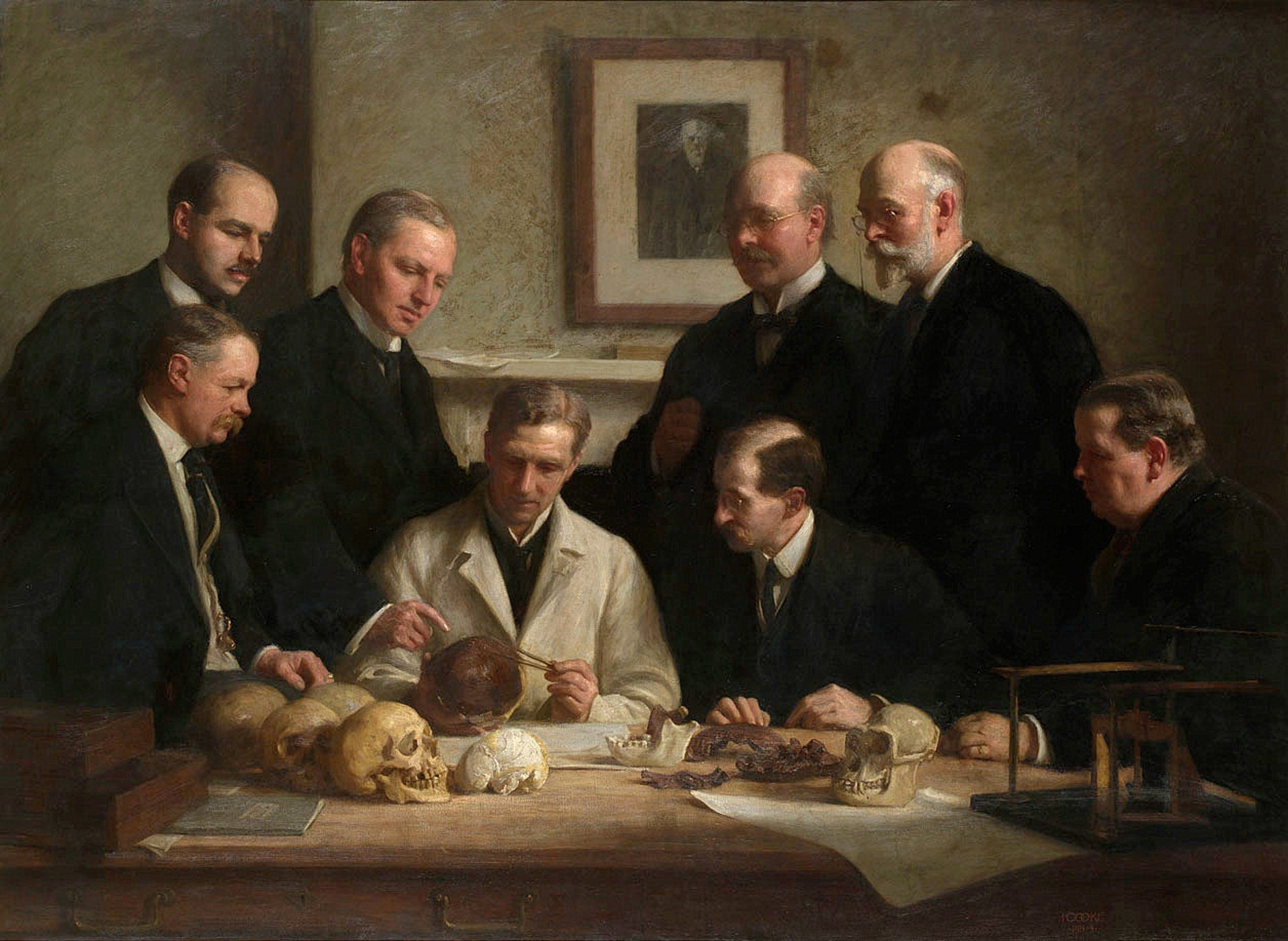
William Plane Pycraft (second from the right on the front row) with others taken in by the Piltdown Man

Pycraft wrote many articles and books on natural history, including The Story of Bird-Life (1900), The Story of Fish-Life (1901), The Story of Reptile Life (1905), The British Museum of Natural History (1910), A History of Birds (1910), The Infancy of Animals (1912), The Courtship of Animals (1913), Birds in Flight (1922), Camouflage in Nature (1925) and Birds of Great Britain and their Natural History (1934).

== See also ==
- Proavis
