= List of films featuring insects =

This is a list of films which prominently feature insects, either as anthropomorphic protagonists, antagonists or mutations such as in horror films, or as subjects in a documentary capacity.

== Fictional narrative films ==
=== Animated ===
Animated films with anthropomorphized insects include:

- The Ant Bully (2006) - ants
- The Fly (1958) - a human-fly mutation hybrid
- The Adventures of André and Wally B. (1984) - bees
- Maya The Bee Movie (2014) - bees and others
- Ants in the Plants (1940) - ants in a Fleischer Color Classics short
- Antz (1998) - ants and others
- Bee Movie (2007) - bees and others
- James and the Giant Peach (1996) - grasshopper, centipede, spider, others
- Billy & Mandy: Wrath of the Spider Queen (2007) - spiders
- Bugs in Love (1932) - lovebugs in a Disney Silly Symphonies short
- A Bug's Life (1998) - ants and others
- The Flea Circus (1954) - fleas
- Gallavants (1984) - ants and an amphisbaena
- The Grasshopper and the Ants (1934) - another Silly Symphonies entry
- Hoppers (2026) - butterflies, ants, spiders, and other species
- A Horse Fly Fleas (1947) - fleas
- An Itch in Time (1943) - a flea
- Johnny the Giant Killer (1950) - bees, spiders and other species
- Katy, Kiki y Koko (1987) - caterpillars, ants and alien molluscs
- Katy la Oruga (1984) - caterpillars, a spider, bees and a butterfly
- Kung Fu Panda (2008) - a praying mantis
- Kung Fu Panda 2 (2011) - a praying mantis
- Kung Fu Panda 3 (2016) - a praying mantis
- The Magic Bird (1968) - ants
- Minuscule: Valley of the Lost Ants (2013) - ladybugs, ants, a spider, and other species
- Minuscule 2: Mandibles from Far Away (2019) - ladybugs, ants, cockroaches, praying mantis, and other species
- Mr. Bug Goes to Town (1941) - a grasshopper, bee, and other species
- Moth and the Flame (1938) - moths
- Pinocchio (1940) - a cricket
- Pipi Tobenai Hotaru (1996) - fireflies
- The Rescuers (1977) - a dragonfly
- Shinbone Alley (1970) - a cockroach
- The Spider and the Fly (1931) - flies
- Strange Magic (2015) - ants, centipedes and other species
- Twilight of the Cockroaches (1987) - cockroaches

=== Non-animated ===
- Fly (1970) - an avant-garde 25 minute film directed by John Lennon and Yoko Ono which depicts a housefly crawling around on the body of a nude woman, actress Virginia Lust. By the end of the film, multiple flies can be seen on Lust's body.
- Joe's Apartment (1996) - cockroaches (live action and puppetry blended with computer and stop-motion animation)
- The Fly (1986) - Flies (live action and puppetry)
- Meet the Applegates (1990) - shapeshifting mantisses try to save their home in Brazil by bringing nuclear holocaust to America
- Eega (2012, The Fly) - flies, an Indian fantasy action film written and directed by S. S. Rajamouli

=== Both ===
- Films and television programmes based on Alice in Wonderland - a caterpillar

== Horror films featuring insects ==
=== Ants ===
- The Naked Jungle (1954; army ants)
- Them! (1954; giant mutated ants)
- Phase IV (1974; super-intelligent ants of various species)
- Empire of the Ants (1977; large mutated ants)
- It Happened at Lakewood Manor (1977)

=== Honey bees ===
- The Deadly Bees (1966)
- Killer Bees (1974)
- The Savage Bees (1976)
- The Bees (1978)
- The Swarm (1978)
- Deadly Invasion: The Killer Bee Nightmare (1995)

=== Cockroaches ===
- Creepshow (1982, killer cockroaches)
- Mimic (1997, evolved human-sized genetically engineered cockroaches)

=== Locusts ===
- Locusts: The 8th Plague (2005)

=== Wasps ===
- Stung (2015; large mutated wasps)

== Documentaries ==
This section includes both educational and scientific films about insects, as well as notable documentary television programs about insects.

=== Films ===
- 1910 The Acrobatic Fly by F. Percy Smith
- 1911 The Strength and Agility of Insects by F. Percy Smith
- 1911 La vita delle farfalle by Roberto Omegna and Guido Gozzano
- 1960 Secrets of the Ant and Insect World from Walt Disney's 1956 Secrets of Life
- 1996 Microcosmos by Claude Nuridsany and Marie Pérennou is a record of detailed interactions between insects and other small invertebrates.
- 2009 Beetle Queen Conquers Tokyo by Jessica Oreck
- 2009 Vanishing of the Bees by George Langworthy and Maryam Henein about bees' colony collapse disorder
- 2010 The Death of an Insect by Hannes Vartiainen and Pekka Veikkolainen
- 2010 Colony by Carter Gunn and Ross McDonnell about bees' colony collapse disorder
- 2010 Queen of the Sun by Taggart Siegel about bees' colony collapse disorder
- 2011 Wings of Life by Louis Schwartzberg
- 2012 More than Honey by Markus Imhoof about honeybees
- 2016 Bugs by Andreas Johnsen about insects as a food source for humans

The Hellstrom Chronicle (1971) is a quasi-documentary film about the struggle between man and insects. Andrea Shaw called it a faux documentary, although it won the 1971 Academy Award for the best documentary.

=== Television and video ===
- 1973 and forward The Real world of insects series by the Learning Corporation of America
- 1979 David Attenborough's BBC series Life on Earth, episodes "The First Forests" and "The Swarming Hordes"
- 1988 Reading Rainbow, "Bugs", Season 6, Episode 2
- 1996 Alien Empire BBC production
- 1998 Bug City (TV series)
- 1999, 2001 Insectia a Discovery Channel program
- 2003 Episodes of DragonflyTV including "Creepy Crawlies" (2003), Weevils (2006) and "Butterfly Wings" (2008)
- 2005 David Attenborough's BBC series Life in the Undergrowth
- 2009, 2011–2012 Monster Bug Wars by Beyond Television Productions of Australia

== See also ==
- Category:Documentary films about bees
