= J. V. Durden =

British filmmaker and biologist (1910–1997)

- Born: Joseph Valentine Durden; 20 October 1910; Barnes, Surrey
- Died: 13 February 1998 (aged 87); Vale Royal, Cheshire
- Education: Royal College of Science
- Occupations: Director, cinemicrographer, cinematographer, producer, editor, writer
- Years active: 1943–1972
- Spouse: Kathleen Meredith
- Children: son, Christopher and daughter, Janet
- Parent(s): James Durden and Ruby Valentina Ellis

J. V. Durden (20 October 1910 – 13 February 1998) was a British filmmaker and biologist. He is the person who created the term 'Ciné-biology', or 'the study of life through the medium of the cinema'. He described himself as a 'ciné-biologist', or 'scientist-filmmaker', and spent his life making highly detailed, technically intricate, lab-created films, where photography took place under a microscope. He brought the art of cinemicrography to Canada and became the co-founder of the Science Film Section at the National Film Board of Canada.

== Early life ==
Joseph Valentine Durden was born in Barnes, Surrey (now part of London), on 20 October 1910; he grew up in Kensington. His parents were; mother, Ruby Valentina Ellis (from Cumberland), father was the noted English painter James Durden (from Manchester). He had one sister, the artist Betty Durden Green, who was the subject of a well-known portrait by her father. Joseph earned a degree in Biology and Entomology at the Royal College of Science. He had a life-long interest in photography and, while still in school, became a photographer for the Illustrated London News.

Upon graduation, Durden traveled with his parents to Africa. In Basutoland (now Lesotho) in 1934, he acted as the photographer on a plant-collecting expedition then, in Cape Town, he happened to see films from Secrets of Nature, a 144-film series of natural history films produced from 1922 to 1933 by British Instructional Films and distributed throughout the British Empire. Durden was so taken by these films that he resolved to become a scientific cinematographer.

== Career ==
When he returned to England in 1935, Durden was hired by British Instructional Films which, after its sale, was now Gaumont-British Instructional (GBI). Secrets of Nature was no longer in production, but the series had been enormously popular; it brought the life sciences into popular culture and was so influential, the filmmaker and historian Paul Rotha described it as "the sheet anchor of the British film industry’’. Gaumont-British wanted to continue with scientific films and, in Durden, they had a photographer who was also a biologist. Durden found himself working with his former Royal College tutor H.R. Hewer, with the filmmaker Agnes Mary Field, and with the nature documentary pioneer Percy Smith. Field and Smith had both been the editors of Secrets of Nature; now they were working on Secrets of Life.

Smith had developed innovative techniques in time-lapse photography, microphotography, microcinematography and animation. Learning from him, Durden became an expert in stop-motion photography and cinemicrography, building on Smith's techniques and incorporating new methods, including the use of phase-contrast microscopy and colour cinematography. His work at GBI was mainly on educational films in zoology (supervised by Julian Huxley), but he was instrumental in the development of the first series of Secrets of Life to be released in colour (1939), which were made using Dufaycolor.

Durden, Smith and Field wanted to publish the results of their work and co-wrote the book Ciné-biology, which was published in 1942. The book was not the first attempt to theorize the relationship between cinema and science, but it was the clearest and most public. It describes Ciné-biology as "the study of life through the medium of the cinema". The "revealing eye" of the microscope and the "analytical brain" of the camera are active observers; by portraying the aliveness of the world, technology itself comes to life. Capturing and manipulating movement was Ciné-biology's most critical characteristic: "Movement, despite the advent and firm establishment of sound films, is the essence of the cinema ... And, in the cinema, we have the ideal medium for the study of life.” Ciné-biology treated film as a discipline of its own, complete with tools, practices and methods. Despite its focus on expertise, it also made science more appealing and interlaced the roles of filmmakers, experts, technologies and the wider public in making nature films.

In 1942, Durden was drafted into the British Army. He was initially a gunner but was transferred to the Army Kinematograph Service, where he made training films and was discharged in 1945 with the rank of Lieutenant.

By war's end, Smith had died and Field was making children's films for The Rank Organisation. Durden joined the Shell Film Unit; in 1948, he wrote the script for the film Atomic Physics, which won the 1949 BAFTA Special Award. He and Field finished the sequel to Ciné-biology, See How They Grow: Botany Through the Cinema (1952).

Durden also established his own company, Photomicrography Ltd., to supply specialist science footage to producers. One of these producers was likely the Crown Film Unit and one of the filmmakers at that unit was Stuart Legg, who had also worked for the Shell unit and GBI. Legg had just returned from a seven-year stint as a filmmaker with the National Film Board of Canada (NFB). It is reasonable to assume that the two men knew each other, and that Legg told Durden that the NFB was eager to make more scientific films. In 1952, Durden moved to Ottawa and joined the NFB's Studio B.

Studio B, under the leadership of Tom Daly was responsible for making films on science and the arts, animated films, experimental films, educational films and films sponsored by government departments. At the time, no one person was making science films; Durden, as a photographer and biologist, was a perfect fit, except that he did not want to be like the other NFB filmmakers, who might make a training film one week and an agricultural film the next; he was firm about staying with his specific discipline. Eventually, in 1956, Daly hired Hugh O'Connor to build Studio B's Science Film Section. In the interim, Durden made such films as the award-winning Embryonic Development: The Chick (1953), (which is still distributed worldwide), The Colour of Life (1955), a film about the growth of a maple tree, Man Against a Fungus, which illustrates the life cycle of wheat rust fungus, and The Maple Leaf, which looks at the physiology of leaves. Over the next six years, he made an additional 18 scientific films for the board.

In 1962, Durden was recruited by Boston's Educational Services Inc. (ESI), which had been founded by MIT professor Jerrold R. Zacharias. At the time, the National Science Foundation was heavily investing in science education, and one of its initiatives was the Developmental Biology Film Series, produced by ESI. The series was 75 highly specialized films, and Durden would make them all, always working with expert biologists who wanted to replicate on film what they saw under the microscope. The films had a powerful impact on the American evolutionary biologist Lynn Margulis, who used them in her teaching. In 2010, she started a campaign to digitize the films and publish them online, calling the effort “the most important contribution I have made to science in my lifetime”. These films now have their own YouTube channel.

In 1972, when the project was completed, Durden retired and returned to England. He died in Cheshire in 1997, survived by his daughter, Janet and son, Christopher.

== Filmography ==
Gaumont-British Instructional

- The Life Story of a Fern - documentary short 1935 - director
- The Life Story of a Tadpole - documentary short 1936 - director
- The Life of a One-Celled Animal (Amoeba) - documentary short 1937 - director
- The Sea Urchin - documentary short 1936 - co-director with H.R. Hewer
- The Sea Urchin, Reel 2 - documentary short 1937 - director
- The Life Story of Echinus - documentary short 1937 - director
- Pollination - documentary short 1937 - editor
- Paramecium - documentary short 1937 - director
- The Development of the Chick - documentary short 1937 - director
- The Development of the Tadpole - documentary short 1937 - director
- Heredity in Animals - documentary short 1937 - director
- Heredity in Man - documentary short 1937 - director
- Animals of the Rocky Shore - documentary short 1937 - director
- Coelenterata - documentary short, 1937 - documentary short 1937 - director
- From Generation to Generation - documentary short 1937 - director
- The Dandelion - documentary short 1938 - director
- The Fern - documentary short 1938 - director
- Fasciola: The Life Story of a Trematode - documentary short 1938 - director
- Development of the Trout - documentary short 1938 - director
- Seed Dispersal by Exploding Fruits - documentary short 1938 - editor, director
- Seed Dispersal by Burial - documentary short 1938 - editor, director
- Climbing Plants - documentary short 1938 - director
- Hydra - documentary short 1938 - director
- And Now They Rest - documentary short 1939 - director
- Welsh Plant-Breeding Station - documentary short 1939 - director
- Crustacea - documentary short, 1940 - director
- Onychophora and Myriapoda - documentary short, 1940 - director
- Emperor Moth - documentary short 1940 - editor, director
- Wisdom of the Wild - documentary short, Mary Field 1940 - co-cinemicrographer with F. Percy Smith
- Arachnida - documentary short, 1940 - director
- Astacus - documentary short, 1940 - director
- Asparagus Beetle - documentary short, 1941 - director
- Getting His Wings - documentary short, Mary Field 1942 - co-cinemicrographer with F. Percy Smith

Shell Film Unit

- Atomic Physics - documentary short, 1948 - writer
- The Codling Moth - documentary short, 1950 - cinemicrographer, director
- Brown Rot - documentary short, 1950 - cinemicrographer, director
- Plant Pests and Diseases: Leather Jacket - documentary short, 1950 - cinemicrographer, director
- Greenhouse White Fly - documentary short, 1950 - cinemicrographer, director
- Plant Pests and Diseases: Red Spider - documentary short, 1950 - cinemicrographer, director
- Plant Pests and Diseases: Raspberry Beetle - documentary short, 1950 - cinemicrographer, director
- Plant Pests and Diseases: Flea Beetle - documentary short, 1951 - cinemicrographer, director
- Cabbage Root Fly - documentary short, 1951 - cinemicrographer, director
- Winter Moths - documentary short, 1951 - cinemicrographer, director
- Apple Aphis - documentary short, 1951 - cinemicrographer, director

National Film Board of Canada

- Embryonic Development: The Chick - documentary short, 1953 - writer, producer, director, cinemicrographer
- The Colour of Life - documentary short, 1955 - writer, producer, director, cinemicrographer
- Man Against a Fungus - documentary short, Maurice Constant 1955 - editor, cinemicrographer
- The Maple Leaf - documentary short, Maurice Constant 1955 - writer, producer, director
- The Forest Tent Caterpillar - documentary short, 1956 - writer, editor, producer, director, cinemicrographer
- The Spruce Bog: An Essay in Ecology - documentary short, Dalton Muir 1957 - writer, editor, producer
- Honey Bees and Pollination - documentary short, Maurice Constant 1957 - editor, co-producer with Larry Gosnell and David Bairstow, co-director with Larry Gosnell, cinemicrographer
- The Changing Forest - documentary short, Maurice Constant 1958 - writer, producer
- Wheat Rust - documentary short, Maurice Constant 1958 – producer, cinemicrographer
- Birth of a Caterpillar - documentary short, 1959 - co-cinemicrographer with William H. Carrick
- The Spawning of a Fish - documentary short, 1959 - co-cinemicrographer with William H. Carrick
- Emergence of a Dragonfly - documentary short, 1960 - co-cinemicrographer with William H. Carrick
- Microscopic Fungi - documentary short, 1960 - writer, editor, director, cinemicrographer
- Introducing Insects - documentary short, 1960 - cinemicrographer, editor, director, co-writer with Barrie McLean
- Above the Timberline: The Alpine Tundra Zone - documentary short, 1960 - writer, editor, director, cinemicrographer
- Trout Stream - documentary short, Hugh O'Connor 1961 - co-cinematographer with William H. Carrick
- Butterflies, Beatles and Bugs - documentary short, 1961 - editor, director, cinemicrographer, co-writer with Barrie McLean
- The Flower and the Hive - documentary short, 1961 - with Larry Gosnell, co-writer, -producer and -director, cinemicrographer
- Snow - documentary short, 1961 - co-cinematographer with Bruno Engler and Barrie McLean
- The Embryonic Development of Fish - documentary short, 1961 - writer, editor, director, cinemicrographer
- The Development of a Fish Embryo - documentary short, 1962 - writer, director, cinemicrographer
- The Fish Embryo from Fertilization to Hatching - documentary short, 1963 - writer, director, cinemicrographer

Education Development Center - Developmental Biology Film Series

- 75 films produced between 1963 and 1972, digitized in 2017, and available for viewing here:https://www.youtube.com/playlist?list=PLDhR-8P-YpwGtFzNrzO50rI5hArXcWwJH

== Awards ==
Embryonic Development: The Chick (1953)

- Golden Reel International Film Festival, Film Council of America, New York: Recognition of Merit, 1954
- 6th Canadian Film Awards, Montreal: Honourable Mention, Non-theatrical, 1954
- Kootenay Film Festival, Nelson, British Columbia: Second Prize, Science, 1955
- Salerno Film Festival, Salerno: First Prize – Cup of the National Association of Film Journalists, 1956
- Rapallo International Film Festival, Rapallo: First Prize, Scientific Films, 1957

The Changing Forest (1958)

- International Review of Specialized Cinematography, Rome: Silver Medal, 1959
- Scholastic Teacher Magazine Annual Film Awards: Outstanding Scholastic Teacher's Award, 1960

Above the Timberline: The Alpine Tundra Zone (1960)

- Film Survey, Trieste: Silver Medal for remarkable photography

Microscopic Fungi - documentary short, 1960

- International Exhibition of Scientific Film, Buenos Aires: Diploma of Honour with Special Mention, 1964

The Embryonic Development of Fish (1961)

- International Survey of Scientific and Didactic Films, Padua: First Prize, Didactic Films, 1961
- Columbus International Film & Animation Festival, Columbus, Ohio: Chris Certificate, Education, College Level, 1961
- International Agricultural Film Competition, Berlin: Third Prize, Instructional Films, 1961
- Congress of the International Cinematographic Associations Union (UNIATEC), Turin: Award of Merit, 1961
- Columbus International Film & Animation Festival, Columbus, Ohio: Chris Plaque, 1962

The Development of a Fish Embryo (1962)

- International Exhibition of Scientific Film, Buenos Aires: First Prize, Didactic, 1966
- La Plata International Children's Film Festival, La Plata, Argentina: Best Film - Silver Oak Leaf 1966
