= 1945 in animation =

Events in 1945 in animation.

== Events ==
=== January ===
- January 6: Chuck Jones' Odor-able Kitty premieres, produced by Warner Bros. Cartoons which marks the debut of the French skunk Pepé Le Pew.
- January 13:
  - Friz Freleng's Bugs Bunny cartoon Herr Meets Hare premieres, produced by Warner Bros. Cartoons, a war-time propaganda short in which Bugs outsmarts both Hermann Göring and Adolf Hitler.
  - Tex Avery's Screwy Squirrel cartoon The Screwy Truant premieres, produced by MGM's Cartoon Studio.
- January 26: Jack King's Donald Duck cartoon The Clock Watcher premieres, produced by Walt Disney Animation Studios.
- January 27: Bob Clampett's Daffy Duck cartoon Draftee Daffy premieres, produced by Warner Bros. Cartoons.

=== February ===
- February 3: William Hanna and Joseph Barbera's Tom and Jerry cartoon The Mouse Comes to Dinner premieres, produced by MGM's Cartoon Studio. Also starring Toots and Mammy Two Shoes.
- February 10: Frank Tashlin's Bugs Bunny and Elmer Fudd cartoon The Unruly Hare premieres, produced by Warner Bros. Cartoons.
- February 24: Chuck Jones' Porky Pig cartoon Trap Happy Porky premieres, produced by Warner Bros. Cartoons. Also starring Hubie, Bertie, & Claude Cat (prototype).

=== March ===
- March 3: Tex Avery's Droopy cartoon The Shooting of Dan McGoo premieres, produced by MGM's Cartoon Studio.
- March 15: 17th Academy Awards: The Tom and Jerry short Mouse Trouble by William Hanna and Joseph Barbera, produced by MGM, wins the Academy Award for Best Animated Short Film.
- March 24: Friz Freleng's Life with Feathers premieres, produced by Warner Bros. Cartoons which marks the debut of Sylvester the Cat.
- March 30: Jack King's Donald Duck cartoon The Eyes Have It premieres, produced by Walt Disney Animation Studios. Also starring Pluto.

=== April ===
- April 7: Tex Avery's Jerky Turkey premieres, produced by MGM's Cartoon Studio.
- April 12: The first Japanese feature-length animated film, a war-time propaganda cartoon called Momotaro: Sacred Sailors, directed by Mitsuyo Seo, is first released.

=== May ===
- May 5:
  - Friz Freleng's Bugs Bunny cartoon Hare Trigger premieres, produced by Warner Bros. Cartoons, it marks the debut of Bugs' other iconic adversary Yosemite Sam. It is also the first Bugs Bunny cartoon where the titular rabbit and his name appear right before the short's title card is first shown.
- May 7: Bob Clampett leaves Warner Bros. Cartoons to pursue a career in television.
- May 19: Friz Freleng's Daffy Duck cartoon Ain't That Ducky premieres, produced by Warner Bros. Cartoons.

=== June ===
- June 9: Bob Clampett's Tweety cartoon A Gruesome Twosome premieres, produced by Warner Bros. Cartoons. This is the final time where Tweety appears as pink, he would officially appear as yellow in his Friz Freleng debut short Tweetie Pie 2 years later.
- June 22: The Halas and Batchelor cartoon Handling Ships, a training film for the Royal Navy, premieres, being the first British animated film in Technicolor.
- June 29: Jack King's Donald Duck short Donald's Crime premieres, produced by Walt Disney Animation Studios. Also starring Huey, Dewey, Louie, & Daisy Duck.
- June 30: Frank Tashlin's Tale of Two Mice premieres, produced by Warner Bros. Cartoons.

=== July ===
- July 7: William Hanna and Joseph Barbera's Tom and Jerry cartoon Mouse in Manhattan premieres, produced by MGM's Cartoon Studio. Tom only appears at the beginning and end of the short as it mainly focuses on Jerry.
- July 21: William Hanna and Joseph Barbera's Tom and Jerry cartoon Tee for Two premieres, produced by MGM's Cartoon Studio.
- July 28: Bob Clampett's Porky Pig cartoon Wagon Heels premieres, produced by Warner Bros. Cartoons.

=== August ===
- August 10: Jack Kinney's Donald Duck cartoon Duck Pimples premieres, produced by Walt Disney Animation Studios.
- August 11: Chuck Jones' Bugs Bunny cartoon Hare Conditioned premieres, produced by Warner Bros. Cartoons.
- August 25: Tex Avery's Swing Shift Cinderella premieres, produced by MGM's Cartoon Studio.

=== September ===
- September 7: Jack Hannah's Donald Duck and Goofy cartoon No Sail premieres, produced by Walt Disney Animation Studios.
- September 15: Bob Clampett's The Bashful Buzzard premieres, produced by Warner Bros. Cartoons.
- September 21: Jack Kinney's Goofy cartoon Hockey Homicide premieres, produced by Walt Disney Animation Studios.
- September 22: William Hanna and Joseph Barbera's Tom and Jerry short Flirty Birdy premieres, produced by MGM's Cartoon Studio.

=== October ===
- October 15: The first issue of the Dutch comics magazine Stripfilm is published. It also offers information about animation techniques, provided by the animation studio Stripfilm. The magazine will last until 23 November.
- October 20: Friz Freleng's Sylvester cartoon Peck Up Your Troubles premieres, produced by Warner Bros. Cartoons it marks the debut of Hector the Bulldog.
- October 26: Jack King's Donald Duck cartoon Cured Duck premieres, produced by Walt Disney Animation Studios. Also starring Daisy Duck.

=== November ===
- November 3: Tex Avery's Droopy cartoon Wild and Woolfy premieres, produced by MGM's Cartoon Studio.
- November 10: Chuck Jones' Bugs Bunny and Elmer Fudd cartoon Hare Tonic premieres, produced by Warner Bros. Cartoons.
- November 16: Isadore Sparber's The Friendly Ghost premieres, produced by Famous Studios, in which Casper the Friendly Ghost makes his debut.
- November 23: The Spanish animated film Garbancito de la Mancha by José María Blay and Arturo Moreno premieres.
  Joaquín Bisbe

=== December ===
- December 1: Frank Tashlin's final Daffy Duck short Nasty Quacks premieres, produced by Warner Bros. Cartoons.
- December 21: Jack King's Donald Duck short Old Sequoia premieres, produced by Walt Disney Animation Studios.
- December 22: William Hanna and Joseph Barbera's Tom and Jerry short Quiet Please! premieres, produced by MGM's Cartoon Studio and also starring Spike the bulldog.

== Specific date unknown ==
- The Soviet animated feature film The Lost Letter by Lamis Bredis and the Brumberg sisters premieres.
- Karel Zeman and Bořivoj Zeman's A Christmas Dream premieres.
- Stamatis L. Polenakis releases O Ntoútse afigeítai, translated as The Duce Narrates, an animated film which satirizes Benito Mussolini and his invasion of Greece.

== Films released ==
- January 1 - The Lost Letter (Soviet Union)
- April 12 - Momotaro: Sacred Sailors (Japan)
- June 22 - Handling Ships (United Kingdom)
- November 23 - The Enchanted Sword (Spain)

== Births ==
=== January ===
- January 9: Richard Lorenzana, American production accountant (The Simpsons, Futurama, Napoleon Dynamite), (d. 2014).
- January 12: Barrington Bunce, English-born American animator (Hanna-Barbera, Spider-Woman, Ruby-Spears Enterprises, Garbage Pail Kids, The Simpsons), storyboard artist (Dink, the Little Dinosaur, Marvel Productions, Hanna-Barbera, Wild West C.O.W.-Boys of Moo Mesa, Red Planet, Freakazoid!, Adventures in Odyssey, Nickelodeon Animation Studio, Butt Ugly Martians, Make Way for Noddy, Danger Rangers), character designer (ChalkZone) and art director (Alvin and the Chipmunks), (d. 2005).
- January 22: Steve Vinovich, American actor (voice of Puffin in The Swan Princess franchise, Maurice/Ranger in The Trumpet of the Swan, Park Ranger in Alpha and Omega).
- January 29: Tom Selleck, American actor (voice of Cornelius Robinson in Meet the Robinsons).

=== February ===
- February 2: Maxwell Becraft, Canadian animator (Warner Bros. Animation, The Super Mario Bros. Super Show!, He-Man and the Masters of the Universe, Bucky O'Hare and the Toad Wars, Attack of the Killer Tomatoes, Duckman, Muppet Babies, Sonic the Hedgehog, X-Men), (d. 2007).
- February 4: Tony Haygarth, English actor (voice of Mr. Tweedy in Chicken Run), (d. 2017).
- February 9: Mia Farrow, American actress (portrayed Daisy Suchot in Arthur and the Invisibles, Arthur and the Revenge of Maltazard, and Arthur 3: The War of the Two Worlds voice of the title characters in The Last Unicorn and Darah, Doris in Redux Riding Hood).
- February 12: Boris Bystrov, Russian actor (Russian dub voice of Taurus Bulba in Darkwing Duck, Thaddeus Plotz in Animaniacs, Homer Simpson in The Simpsons Movie), (d. 2024).
- February 20:
  - Henry Polic II, American actor (voice of Jonathan Crane / Scarecrow in Batman: The Animated Series, Baba Looey in Yo Yogi!, Tracker Smurf in The Smurfs), (d. 2013).
  - Brion James, American actor (voice of Rudy Jones / Parasite in Superman: The Animated Series), (d. 1999).
- February 23: Lynn Spees, American animator (The Secret of NIMH, FernGully: The Last Rainforest), (d. 2021).
- February 24: Barry Bostwick, American actor (voice of Thunderbolt in 101 Dalmatians II: Patch's London Adventure, Grandpa Longneck in The Land Before Time XIV: Journey of the Brave, Irv Kleinman and Bernie Benson in The New Batman Adventures episode "Mean Seasons", Doctor St. Croix in the Rapunzel's Tangled Adventure episode "Great Expotations", Grandpa Clyde Flynn in Phineas and Ferb).

=== March ===
- March 2: Donald Kushner, American producer (Animalympics, Tron, The Brave Little Toaster, Rover Dangerfield).
- March 8:
  - Bruce Broughton, American composer (Tiny Toon Adventures, Walt Disney Company).
  - Micky Dolenz, American actor, musician, television producer, businessman and member of The Monkees (voice of Skip Gilroy in The Funky Phantom, Wally in Butch Cassidy, Freddie the Fantastic and Scootch in Partridge Family 2200 A.D., Tod Devlin in Devlin, Willie Sheeler in The Skatebirds, Ralph and Scribble in The Secret Files of the Spy Dogs, Wendell the Love Grub in the Mighty Magiswords episode "The Saga of Robopiggeh!", Min and Max in the Batman: The Animated Series episode "Two-Face", first voice of Arthur in The Tick).
- March 13: Whitney Rydbeck, American actor (provided additional voices for Oliver & Company), (d. 2024).
- March 18: Susan Tyrrell, American actress (narrator in Wizards), (d. 2012).
- March 31: Edwin Catmull, American computer scientist (co-founder of Pixar).

=== April ===
- April 2: Linda Hunt, American actress (voice of Grandmother Willow in Pocahontas and Pocahontas II: Journey to a New World).
- April 10: Shirley Walker, American composer and conductor (Warner Bros. Animation), (d. 2006).
- April 26: Richard Doyle, American actor (voice of Enoch in Ben 10, Driscoll and Mr. Baumann in Ben 10: Ultimate Alien, Robert Kelly in Wolverine and the X-Men).

=== May ===
- May 4: Robert Machray, American actor (voice of Principal in Rapsittie Street Kids: Believe in Santa), (d. 2025).
- May 11: John Welson, Canadian animator (Special Delivery).
- May 24: Priscilla Presley, American actress and former wife of Elvis Presley (created and voiced herself in Agent Elvis).

=== June ===
- June 11: Adrienne Barbeau, American actress (voice of Catwoman in the DC Animated Universe, Simone Lenoir in Scooby-Doo on Zombie Island, Helga Von Guggen in Totally Spies!).
- June 14: Marilyn Schreffler, American actress (voice of Brenda Chance in Captain Caveman and the Teen Angels, Daisy Mayhem in Scooby's All-Star Laff-A-Lympics, Wendy in Yogi's Space Race and Buford and the Galloping Ghost, Olive Oyl in The All New Popeye Hour, and Popeye and Son, Kuma in Pole Position, Natasha in Rose Petal Place, Winnie Werewolf in Scooby-Doo and the Ghoul School), (d. 1988).
- June 19: Marsha Kramer, American actress (additional voices in Antz, Ice Age, Jimmy Neutron: Boy Genius, The Simpsons Movie, The Lego Movie and The SpongeBob Movie: Sponge Out of Water), (d. 2020).

=== July ===
- July 1: Debbie Harry, American singer, songwriter, and actress (voice of Vaingloria in Phantom 2040, singing voice of Angel in Rock & Rule).
- July 6: Burt Ward, American actor, animal rights activist, and businessman (voice of Robin in The New Adventures of Batman, Batman: Return of the Caped Crusaders, Batman vs. Two-Face, and The Simpsons episode "Large Marge", young Barnacle Boy in the SpongeBob SquarePants episode "Back to the Past", himself in the Futurama episode "Leela and the Genestalk" and the Robot Chicken episode "Robot Chicken DC Comics Special III: Magical Friendship").
- July 10:
  - Ron Glass, American actor (voice of Randy Carmichael in Rugrats and All Grown Up!, Dr. Lazenby in Recess: School's Out, Talking Baby in The Proud Family, Kwanseer in the Aladdin episode "Bad Mood Rising", News Anchorman in the Superman: The Animated Series episode "Blasts From The Past"), (d. 2016).
  - Katsuji Mori, Japanese voice actor (voice of the title character in Mach GoGoGo).
- July 14: Maxine Waters Willard, American choir singer (choir performer in The Lion King, A Goofy Movie, Adventures from the Book of Virtues, The Lion King II: Simba's Pride, The Brave Little Toaster Goes to Mars and The Angry Beavers, additional voices in Brother Bear).
- July 19: George Dzundza, German-American retired actor (voice of Ventriloquist in the DC Animated Universe, Perry White in Superman: The Animated Series, and Superman: Brainiac Attacks, Ivan Bloski in the Animaniacs episode "Plane Pals", Gustav Hovac in the Road Rovers episode "Where Rovers Dare").
- July 23: Edie McClurg, American actress (voice of Miss Right in The Secret of NIMH, Carlotta in The Little Mermaid franchise, Winnie Pig in Tiny Toon Adventures, Aunt Ruth Generic in Bobby's World, Mrs. Normanmeyer in The Addams Family, Fran in Higglytown Heroes, Ora Anderson in Life with Louie, Dr. Flora in A Bug's Life, Peggy Jones in Scooby-Doo! Pirates Ahoy!, Mary in Wreck-It Ralph, Greta in Frozen, Mrs. Butterworth in Foodfight!, Vera Tennyson in the Ben 10: Omniverse episode "Clyde Five", herself in the Family Guy episode "Holly Bibble").
- July 26: Helen Mirren, English actress (voice of Nyra in Legend of the Guardians: The Owls of Ga'Hoole, Dean Hardscrabble in Monsters University, the title character in The Snow Queen).
- July 28: Jim Davis, American cartoonist, television producer, screenwriter and film producer (creator of Garfield).

=== August ===
- August 2: Joanna Cassidy, American actress (portrayed Dolores in Who Framed Roger Rabbit, voice of Maggie Sawyer in Superman: The Animated Series).
- August 5: Loni Anderson, American actress (voice of Flo in All Dogs Go to Heaven, Blondie Bumstead in Blondie & Dagwood, and Blondie & Dagwood: Second Wedding Workout, herself in the Duck Dodgers episode "A Lame Duck Mind"), (d. 2025).
- August 6: Lori Hanson, American ink & paint artist (Hanna-Barbera, Teenage Mutant Ninja Turtles, Life with Louie, Happily Ever After: Fairy Tales for Every Child), (d. 2022).
- August 14: Steve Martin, American actor, comedian, writer, producer and musician (portrayed Mr. Chairman in Looney Tunes: Back in Action, voice of Hotep in The Prince of Egypt, Captain Smek in Home, Ray Patterson in The Simpsons episode "Trash of the Titans").
- August 24: Vince McMahon, American businessman and chairman of WWE (voiced himself in Scooby-Doo! WrestleMania Mystery, The Flintstones & WWE: Stone Age SmackDown!, Camp WWE, Scooby-Doo! and WWE: Curse of the Speed Demon, Surf's Up 2: WaveMania, The Jetsons & WWE: Robo-WrestleMania!).
- August 28: Bob Segarini, American-Canadian musician and radio presenter (voice of Woodchuck Berry in The Raccoons episode "Second Chances!"), (d. 2023).
- August 31: Tom Coppola, American animator (Hanna-Barbera, Filmation, The Simpsons, Tiny Toon Adventures, Taz-Mania), (d. 1996).

=== September ===
- September 5: Christian Rodska, English actor (voice of Landlord and Guard in the Animated Tales of the World episode "The Magic Paintbrush"), (d. 2024).
- September 6: Go Nagai, Japanese manga artist (Cutie Honey, Devilman, Mazinger Z).
- September 14: Geoff Levin, American rock musician, songwriter and composer (Street Sharks, Nickelodeon Animation Studio, Sabrina: The Animated Series, Jakers! The Adventures of Piggley Winks).
- September 16: Pat Stevens, American actress (second voice of Velma Dinkley in the Scooby-Doo franchise, additional voices in Dynomutt, Dog Wonder and Captain Caveman and the Teen Angels), (d. 2010).
- September 17: Bruce Spence, New Zealand-Australian actor (voice of Chum in Finding Nemo).
- September 19: Austin Roberts, American singer and songwriter (performed the songs in season 2 of Scooby-Doo Where Are You!), (d. 2024).
- September 29: Reggie Bannister, American actor (voice of Guard in the Transformers: Prime episode "Deus Ex Machina"), (d. 2026).

=== October ===
- October 3: Michael C. Gross, American artist, designer, and film producer (The Real Ghostbusters, Beethoven, Inspector Gadget Saves Christmas, Heavy Metal), (d. 2015).
- October 7: Michael Wallis, American journalist, popular historian, author and speaker (voice of Sheriff in the Cars franchise).
- October 8: William E. Martin, American actor (voice of Rock Man in The Point!, Nightmare King in Little Nemo: Adventures in Slumberland, Shredder in seasons 8 and 10 of Teenage Mutant Ninja Turtles, Samhain in The Real Ghostbusters), (d. 2016).
- October 13: Mike Young, Welsh-American producer (creator of SuperTed, co-founder of Mike Young Productions).
- October 18: Huell Howser, American television personality, actor, producer, writer and singer (voice of Backson in Winnie the Pooh, voiced himself in The Simpsons episode "Oh Brother, Where Bart Thou?"), (d. 2013).
- October 19:
  - John Lithgow, American actor (voice of Alexander in The Country Mouse and the City Mouse: A Christmas Tale, Jean-Claude in Rugrats in Paris: The Movie, Lord Farquaad in Shrek, Maurice in The Jungle Bunch: The Movie, Augustus "Gus" Redfield in The Simpsons episode "Meat Is Murder", himself in The Simpsons episode "I'm Just a Girl Who Can't Say D'oh").
  - Steven C. Melendez, American director producer and animator (Melendez Films).
- October 22: Buzz Potamkin, American television producer and director (The Berenstain Bears, Cartoon All-Stars to the Rescue, Hanna-Barbera, Buster & Chauncey's Silent Night), (d. 2012).
- October 28: Csaba Varga, Hungarian animator and producer (founder of Varga Studio), (d. 2012).
- October 29: Melba Moore, American singer and actress (voice of Whippet Angel in All Dogs Go to Heaven).
- October 30: Henry Winkler, American actor, comedian, author, producer, and director (voice of Fonzie in The Fonz and the Happy Days Gang and Mork & Mindy/Laverne & Shirley/Fonz Hour, Norville in Clifford's Puppy Days, the Snowman in Penn Zero: Part-Time Hero, King Julien XII in All Hail King Julien, Keith in Scoob!, Fritz in Monsters at Work, Santa Claus in Puppy Dog Pals, Boris in Rugrats, Ramrod in The Simpsons episode "Take My Wife, Sleaze", Ambush Bug in the Batman: The Brave and the Bold episode "Mitefall!", Sharkface in the SpongeBob SquarePants episode "Sharks vs. Pods", Bailiff in the DuckTales episode "The Life and Crimes of Scrooge McDuck!", himself in the King of the Hill episode "A Rover Runs Through It" and the BoJack Horseman episode "Still Broken").
- October 31: Brian Doyle-Murray, American actor and comedian (voice of Captain K'nuckles in The Marvelous Misadventures of Flapjack, the Flying Dutchman in SpongeBob SquarePants, Coach Tiffany Gills in My Gym Partner's a Monkey, the Chief in Teamo Supremo, Mr. Twitchell in Frosty Returns).

=== November ===
- November 8: Luba Goy, Canadian actress and comedian (voice of Lotsa Heart Elephant, Treat Heart Pig and Gentle Heart Lamb in the Care Bears franchise.
- November 10: Mick Lally, Irish stage, film and television actor (voice of Brother Aidan in The Secret of Kells), (d. 2010).
- November 19: Paula Weinstein, American producer (Looney Tunes: Back in Action), (d. 2024).
- November 27: James Avery, American actor (voice of Shredder in Teenage Mutant Ninja Turtles, James Rhodes/War Machine in Iron Man and Spider-Man, Haroud Hazi Bin in Aladdin), (d. 2013).

=== December ===
- December 1: Bette Midler, American actress, comedian, singer and author (voice of Georgette in Oliver & Company, Grandmama in The Addams Family and The Addams Family 2, herself in The Simpsons episode "Krusty Gets Kancelled").
- December 13:
  - Heather North, American actress (second voice of Daphne Blake in Scooby-Doo), (d. 2017).
  - Kathy Garver, American actress (voice of Firestar in Spider-Man and His Amazing Friends, Miss America in Spider-Man).
- December 17: Ernie Hudson, American actor (voice of Atticus in Infinity Train, Bill Fowler in Transformers: Prime, Buddy in Puppy Dog Pals, Lucius Fox in Batman: Bad Blood, Cyborg in The Super Powers Team: Galactic Guardians, Security Guard in the Batman: The Animated Series episode "Joker's Wild", Professor Felix in the Superman: The Animated Series episode "Action Figures").
- December 24: Lemmy Kilmister, British singer and member of Motörhead (performed the song "You Better Swim" in The SpongeBob SquarePants Movie), (d. 2015).
- December 25:
  - Paul Willson, American actor (voice of Coach Kluge and Mr. Detweiler in Recess, Florist in The Simpsons episode "Some Enchanted Evening", additional voices in Lloyd in Space).
  - Burt Medall, American animator (Hanna-Barbera, The Grinch Grinches the Cat in the Hat, Filmation, Peanuts specials, Calico Entertainment, Garfield and Friends), sheet timer (Disney Television Animation, My Scene: Masquerade Madness, The Land Before Time, Warner Bros. Animation, Transformers Prime, NFL Rush Zone, Hulk and the Agents of S.M.A.S.H.) and director (Mr. Bogus, Disney Television Animation), (d. 2022).
- December 27: Giovanni Romanini, Italian animator and comics artist, (d. 2020).
- December 30: Davy Jones, English actor, singer and member of The Monkees (portrayed himself in the SpongeBob SquarePants episode "SpongeBob SquarePants vs. The Big One", voice of Jim Hawkins in Treasure Island, the Artful Dodger in Oliver Twist, Nigel in the Phineas and Ferb episode "Meatloaf Surprise", himself in The New Scooby-Doo Movies episode "The Haunted Horseman of Hagglethorn Hall", and the Hey Arnold! episode "Fishing Trip"), (d. 2012).
- December 31: Vernon Wells, Australian actor (voice of Network Head in The Drawn Together Movie: The Movie!).

=== Specific date unknown ===
- George Arthur Bloom, American-Canadian television writer and producer (PBS Kids, Marvel Productions, Sunbow Entertainment, Street Sharks, G.I. Joe Extreme, Street Fighter, Space Racers).

== Deaths ==
=== January ===
- January 7: Arch Heath, American cartoonist, animator, film director and screenwriter (general manager of production at the Eastern Film Corporation), (d. 1945).

=== February ===
- February 2: Seitaro Kitayama, Japanese animation director, credited with the first examples of commercial production of anime, (directed animated adaptations of The Crab and the Monkey, Urashima Tarō, and Momotarō), dies at age 56-57.

=== March ===
- March 4: Lucille La Verne, American actress (voice of the Evil Queen in Snow White and the Seven Dwarfs), dies at age 72.
- March 24: F. Percy Smith, British naturalist and filmmaker, pioneer of time-lapse photography, microphotography, microcinematography, and stop-motion animation (To Demonstrate How Spiders Fly, Fight for the Dardanelles), dies at age 65.

=== September ===
- September 26: Aleksandr Khanzhonkov, Russian cinema entrepreneur, film director, and screenwriter (producer of Ladislas Starevich's ground-breaking stop motion animation), dies at age 68.

=== October ===
- October 8: Felix Salten, Austro-Hungarian writer, literary critic, hunter, and Zionist political activist (authored the bildungsroman-style novel Bambi, a Life in the Woods, sold the film rights to it, and had his novel adapted into the animated feature film Bambi), dies at age 76.

== See also ==
- List of anime by release date (1939–1945)
