= Dora Clarke =

British sculptor and wood carver (1895-1989)

- Born: 1895; Harrow, London, England
- Died: 1989 (aged 93–94)
- Known for: Sculpture, wood carving
- Spouse: Gervase B Middleton

Dora Thacher Clarke, later Dora Middleton, (1895–1989) was a British sculptor and wood carver who also wrote about, and promoted African art.

== Biography ==
Clarke was born in Harrow in Middlesex. Her father, Joseph Thacher Clarke was an American architect. Clarke won a scholarship that allowed her to attend the Slade School of Fine Art. Aged fifteen, Clarke initially studied at the Slade on a part-time basis for three days each week throughout 1910 and 1911 but during 1915 and 1916 she studied sculpture there as a full-time student. Clarke first exhibited at the Royal Academy in 1923 and continued to do so until 1959. In the early 1930s she was a regular exhibitor in group shows at the Goupil Gallery and in March 1937 had her first solo show at the French Gallery. She also exhibited at the Paris Salon and with the Royal Society of British Artists.

Clarke's works included bronze castings, memorials and wood sculptures, often of African heads. For example she was commissioned to sculpt the posthumous portrait bust of Sir Walter Morley Fletcher. The most notable of her memorials is the panel and medallion tribute to Joseph Conrad at Bishopsbourne in Kent, which was unveiled in 1927. Clarke also wrote about, and promoted African art and spent a year, between 1927 and 1928 in Kenya, where she made many drawings which when she returned to London she used as the basis for wood carvings and bronzes of tribal figures. Wood carving became her technique of choice, often working with hardwoods and, on occasion, sperm whale teeth.

Clarke married Admiral Gervase B Middleton in 1938 but rarely exhibited work under her married name. During World War II, Clarke was commissioned by the War Artists' Advisory Committee to produce a portrait medallion depicting a serviceman who had been awarded the George Cross. This proved to be the only portrait medallion acquired for the WAAC collection.

Clarke made several appearances on the nascent television service of the BBC, including as Mary Adams' interviewee in an episode of The World of Women first broadcast on 13 April 1937 and as presenter of the programmes Making a Life Mask (1 November 1937) and Making a Poster (21 February 1938).

Sculptures by Clarke are held in various museums, including the Ashmolean Museum which also holds a 1936 portrait of her by Orovida Camille Pissarro.
