= Sea Stories (disambiguation) =

A sea story is a work of fiction or non-fiction set largely at sea.

Sea Stories may also refer to:

- Sea Stories (band), an Australian band
- Sea Stories (SpongeBob SquarePants), a DVD and VHS video
- Sea Stories (TV series), a 1930s television series
