= F. Martin Duncan =

British naturalist

- Born: 1873
- Died: 1961 (aged 87–88)
- Occupations: Naturalist, photographer, film maker

Francis Martin Duncan (1873–1961) was a British naturalist and nature documentary pioneer who worked for producer Charles Urban. He specialised in micro-cinematography and pioneered many of the techniques of future natural history filmmaking.

== Biography ==
Duncan was the son of noted palaeontologist Peter Martin Duncan. While a student he assisted his father by taking up photography, and acquired a particular interest in microphotography. In the early 1890s he experimented with chronophotography (sequence photography), showing the results in motion on a Zoetrope. In the early 1900s he experimented with colour processes; Gloucester Journal reported on a November 1907 meeting at the Blenheim Club at which he had shown insect and butterfly photographs made on Autochrome, and also with an eight-second sunlight exposure on the recently invented Warner-Powrie plates.

Duncan was recruited by Charles Urban for the newly formed Charles Urban Trading Company in 1903. Together they launched a film series, The Unseen World, showcased at the Alhambra Theatre in London from 17 August 1903, which showed scenes of animal life, with particular emphasis on micro-cinematographic views. The shows were advertised as being shown by the 'Urban-Duncan Micro-Bioscope'. Among the films shown were Circulation of Blood in a Frog's Foot, Red Sludge Worms and the notorious The Cheese Mites, the views of which were preceded by a scene of a man (played by Duncan himself) horrified by what he sees when he views a piece of Stilton through a magnifying glass. Duncan continued to work for Urban until 1908, when he was succeeded by F. Percy Smith.

He continued his career as a zoologist at London Zoo and as a populariser of nature subjects, writing many books on natural history. He also worked as an editor on some of the Secrets of Nature film series in the 1920s. His 1943 book British Shells was positively reviewed as a useful introduction to conchology.

== Filmography ==
- The Unseen World (1903) (series, including The Cheese Mites)
- Studies of Natural History (1903) (series)
- The Busy Bee (1903) (series)
- Marine Studies (1903) (series)
- The Empire of the Ants (1906)

== Selected publications ==
- First Steps in Photo-Micrography: A Handbook for Novices (1902)
- Insect Pests of the Farm and Garden (1906)
- Denizens of the Deep (1907)
- Our Insect Friends and Foes (1911)
- The Seashore: A Book for Boys and Girls (1912)
- Bees, Wasps and Ants (1913)
- Cassell's Natural History (1913)
- Wonders of Insect Life (1915)
- Insect Life in Pond and Stream (1917)
- How Animals Work (1919)
- Animals of the Sea (1922)
- The Book of the Countryside (1928)
- Close-ups from Nature (1930)
- British Shells (1943)
- Wonders of Wild Flower Life (1947)
