= Alice Rosenthal =

Alice Rosenthal (1868-1935) was a British-Jewish film sales manager, film company owner and cinema owner. She was one of the pioneers of the British film industry.

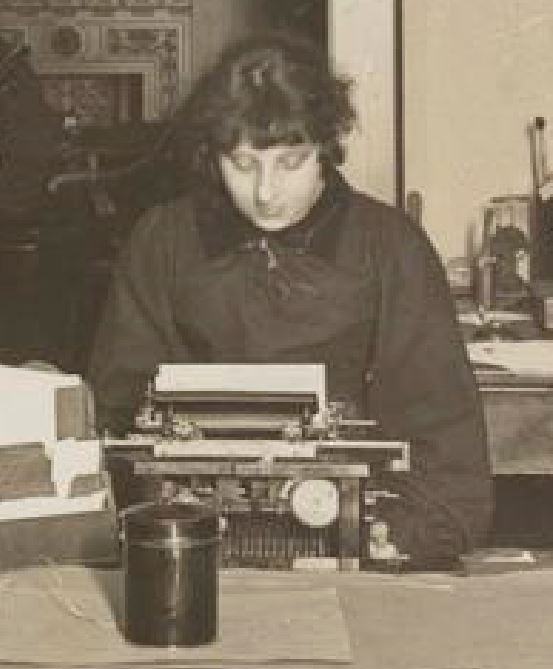
Alice Rosenthal in the offices of the Warwick Trading Company, London, c.1898

== Biography ==
Rosenthal was born in Kentish Town, London, on 13 December 1868, the daughter of Jewish jeweler and general trader Joseph Rosentall and his gentile second wife Matilda (née Brokenbrow). She had been working as a dressmaker when she was taken on as stock manager and sales person for Maguire & Baucus, agents for Edison films in Britain, around 1895/96.The company operated under the name Continental Commerce Company, and was one of the few sources from which exhibitors could obtain films in the early months of film in Britain. As sales manager Rosenthal became a familiar figure to all in the emerging industry, providing films and projectors to many of showmen and women across the UK.

The business expanded hugely in 1897 when a new manager, Charles Urban, took over, and in 1898 was renamed the Warwick Trading Company, after its offices in Warwick Court, London. Rosenthal now sold films and projectors to exhibitors from around the world, making the word 'bioscope' (the name of Urban's trademark cameras and projectors) globally familiar. Many of these films were taken by her brother, Joseph Rosenthal, who had been taken on by Urban at her recommendation.

When Urban left Warwick to form the Charles Urban Trading Company in 1903, Alice Rosenthal went with him. However, she had left the company by 1904 to join the film department of the French company Pathé Frères in London. In 1909 she left Pathé to become sales manager at her brother Joseph's new film company, Rosie Films, based in Croydon (brother and sister each were known by the nickname 'Rosie').

In late 1909 Rosenthal opened a cinema in Croydon, the Cosie Picture Palace. It was a small venue, seating around 200, and ceased operations in 1912. The following year she founded a film company, A.R. Film Co. Ltd. The company produced a small number of short comedy films, shot by her nephew Joseph Rosenthal Jnr., but the business was badly affected by World War One and film production ceased after 1914. After the war Rosenthal worked in the offices of the Royal Air Force, before retiring to Leysdown-on-Sea on the Isle of Sheppey. She died there on 10 October 1935.
