= Joseph Rosenthal (camera operator) =

British filmmaker (1864–1946)

Joseph 'Joe' Rosenthal (1864-1946) was a British camera operator who specialised in filming wars and travel subjects. Conflicts he filmed include the Second Boer War and the Russo-Japanese War. Though preceded as a war filmmaker by some amateurs, film historian Stephen Bottomore has called him the first 'true professional' to film a war.

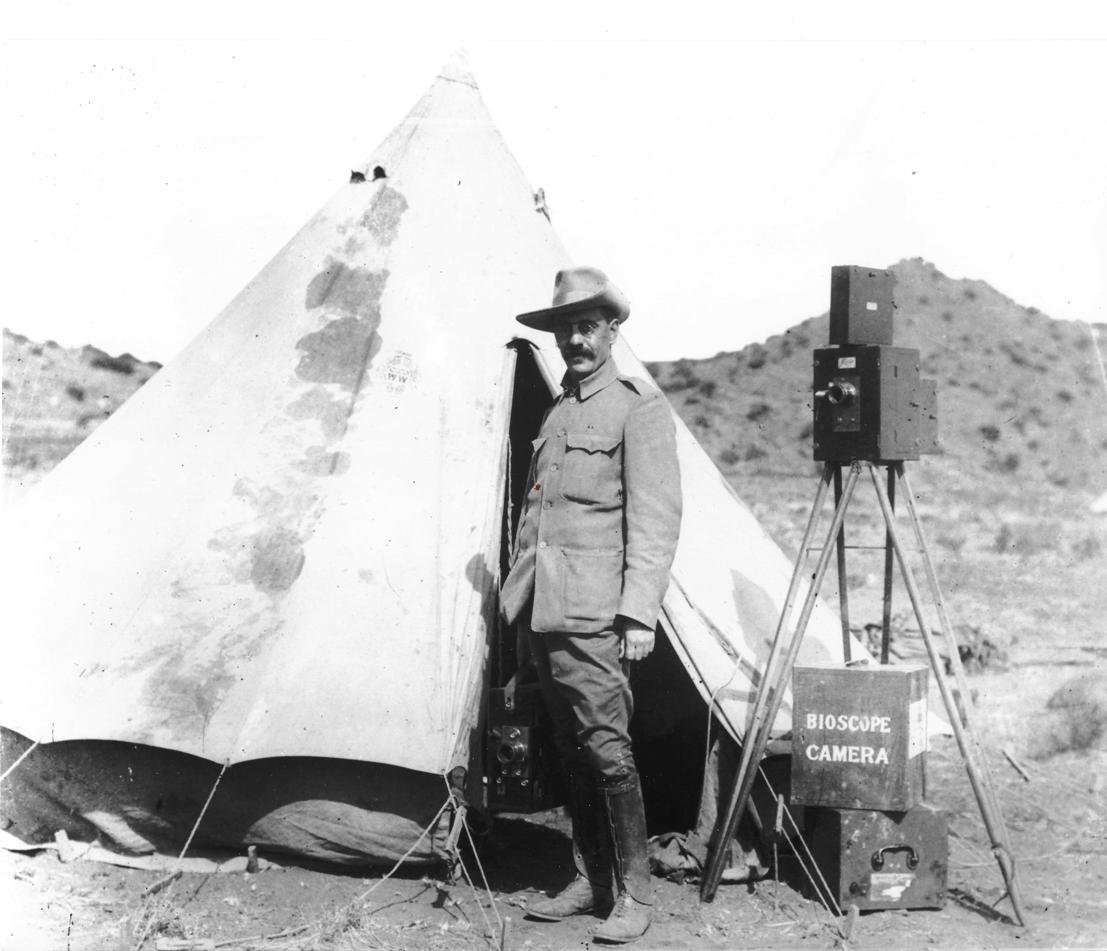
Joseph Rosenthal with tent and cine camera during Second Boer War

== Early life ==
Rosenthal was the son of Jewish jeweler and general trader Joseph Rosentall and his gentile second wife Matilda (née Brokenbrow). He worked as a pharmaceutical chemist before he joined the Continental Commerce Company, Edison film agents in London, in late 1897. He had been recommended to its manager Charles Urban by his younger sister Alice Rosenthal, who was the company's sales manager, on account of his knowledge of photography.

== Second Boer War ==
The Continental Commerce Company was renamed the Warwick Trading Company in 1898, for whom Rosenthal made short travel and actuality films in the UK, Germany, the Netherlands and South Africa, before Urban sent him to the latter shortly after the Second Boer War broke out in October 1899. Arriving in Natal in January 1900, Rosenthal joined General Roberts's column on its advance to Pretoria. He filmed British troops on the march, fording rivers and taking in Boer prisoners. He kept to records of actuality for the most part, but on one occasion at least, the film A Skirmish with the Boers near Kimberley (1900) features obvious staging with the co-operation of British cavalry. Actual conflict was almost impossible to film in any case, owing to military censorship, the limitations of the cine cameras available, and the type of fighting that characterised the war - a combination of long-range rifle fire and the guerilla tactics of the Boer forces. He continued filming up to the surrender at Kroonstad on 12 May 1900 and was present at the raising of the British flag at Pretoria on 5 June 1900, before he returned to Britain.

== Russo-Japanese War ==
In August he was sent to film in China, but arrived too late to film anything of the Boxer Uprising, though he did film some street scenes in Shanghai. He did film some incidents in the Philippine–American War, before travelling to Australia to film the opening of parliament in 1901. The following year he made a number of travel films in Canada for Warwick with sponsorship from the Canadian Pacific Railway and made a dramatic film of Longfellow's poem Hiawatha, featuring members of the Ojibwe people. In 1904, now working for the Charles Urban Trading Company, Rosenthal was sent to film the Russo-Japanese War, being based with the Japanese army. His films, particularly those of the siege of Port Arthur, made a considerable impact and were seen around the world. On a number occasions Rosenthal found himself close to enough to the fighting to be in danger himself. As he recorded, when using a kind of shield used by the Japanese to protect themselves from Russian fire:

Once a fragment from an exploded shell hit the shield within an inch of my eye-hole, knocking myself, camera and shield over in a heap ... On one occasion I took up my station close to a Japanese gun, and spent an hour or more taking photographs of the men as they worked it. When I had finished, I shifted my ground elsewhere, and within twenty minutes a shell from a gun in Port Arthur struck the weapon of which I had been taking pictures . . . Every man working that gun was instantly killed.

As with the Boer War, all of the films taken by Rosenthal were subject to censorship,. Rosenthal had to submit written reports of the films he had taken, and claimed that on occasion he had sneaked through scenes from the battle front not mentioned in his descriptions, at risk of being court-martialled.

== Later life ==
After the war Rosenthal filmed in Borneo and India before being dismissed by Charles Urban in 1907. In 1908 he set up his own film company, Rosie Films (his nickname was 'Rosie') in Croydon, being joined in 1909 by his sister Alice as its sales manager. Rosie Films made both comedy and documentary films, but Rosenthal had little gift for fiction, and only one of his travel films made a significant impact, A Trip to the White Sea Fisheries (1909), which gained praise for its realism and the difficulties experienced in producing it. The company folded in 1913 and Rosenthal played a diminishing role in film production thereafter. He had married Alice Mary Williams in 1893, and their son Joseph Rosenthal Jnr. (1894-1940) became a cinematographer on several British feature films in the 1920s. Joseph Rosenthal died in 1946. Most of his surviving films and photographs are held by the British Film Institute.
