= Hackenberg =

Hackenberg may refer to:

People

- Christian Hackenberg (born 1995), American football quarterback
- Drue Hackenberg (born 2002), American baseball pitcher
- David Hackenberg, American beekeeper and early witness to Colony Collapse Disorder
- Jacob Hackenburg Griffiths-Randolph (1914–1986), judge and politician in Ghana
- Peter Hackenberg (born 1989), German professional footballer

Places

- Hackenberg (Vienna), suburb of Vienna, Austria
- Ouvrage Hackenberg, fortification near Veckring, a French commune

See also

- Hachenburg, German town
- Giovanni Narcis Hakkenberg (1923–2013), Dutch marine
- Hankenberge, former German municipality, now part of Hilter
