= Maryam Henein =

Canadian-American documentary film director, journalist and entrepreneur

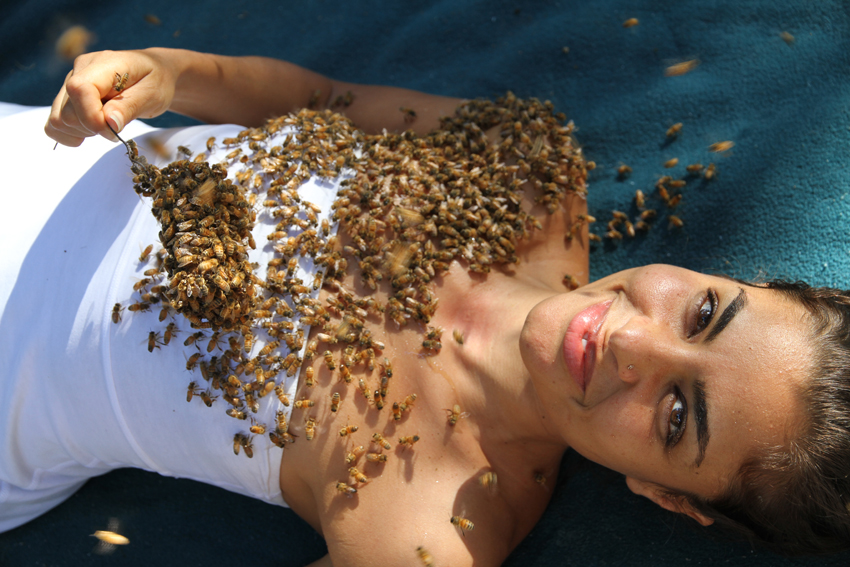
- Born: Montreal, Quebec, Canada
- Education: Concordia
- Occupations: Functional medicine consultant, Filmmaker, Entrepreneur
- Years active: 1998–present
- Notable work: Vanishing of the Bees, HoneyColony
- Website: maryamhenein.com

Maryam Henein is a Canadian-born activist, alternative medicine practitioner, filmmaker, and entrepreneur. She directed the documentary Vanishing of the Bees narrated by Elliot Page.

== Early life and education ==
Henein is a native of Montreal, Quebec, Canada.

== Career ==
She interviewed documentarian Morgan Spurlock for Penthouse, and also produced documentaries for the UK's September Films on subjects that include pimps, drug dealers and porn stars in the Los Angeles area. She was also part of First Apartment, a reality show webcast in the late 1990s and early 2000s on the now-defunct website crushedplanet.com, produced by Joe and Harry Gantz of Taxicab Confessions.

=== Vanishing of the Bees ===
With George Langworthy, Henein directed the 2010 documentary (which took five years to produce), Vanishing of the Bees with Elliot Page (Note: Credited as Ellen Page) narrating the film.

=== HoneyColony ===
Henein is the founder of HoneyColony Inc., a member-supported online magazine that hosts a number of optimized-health and investigative writers called "Hive Advisers".

=== Of Bees & Men ===
Henein continues to work on projects involving bees and contamination of the food supply. She is working on a memoir titled Of Bees & Men and launched a year-long Save the Bees campaign in June 2014.

== Controversy ==
Henein is an adherent of the conspiracy theory that the COVID-19 pandemic was planned by authorities.

Henein was the subject of a 2020 report by Media Matters for America, a liberal media watchdog group, documenting her website's medical misinformation, such as the false claim that vaccines cause autism. Henein was one of several individuals who subsequently received written warnings from the US Food and Drug Administration over the advertisement of chelated silver, vitamin C, and magnesium for preventative use against COVID-19. Henein maintained she did not commit any fault, and amended her website in accordance with the FDA's requirements.

== Filmography ==
=== Film ===
Year	Title	Role	Notes
2004	Catwoman	Assistant to the director Pitof	Film
2009	Vanishing of the Bees	Director / Producer / Writer	Award Winning Film
2022	George Floyd Review	Director / Producer / Writer	Crowdfunding/in production
