= Florence Maude Warner =

American woman inventor and company director

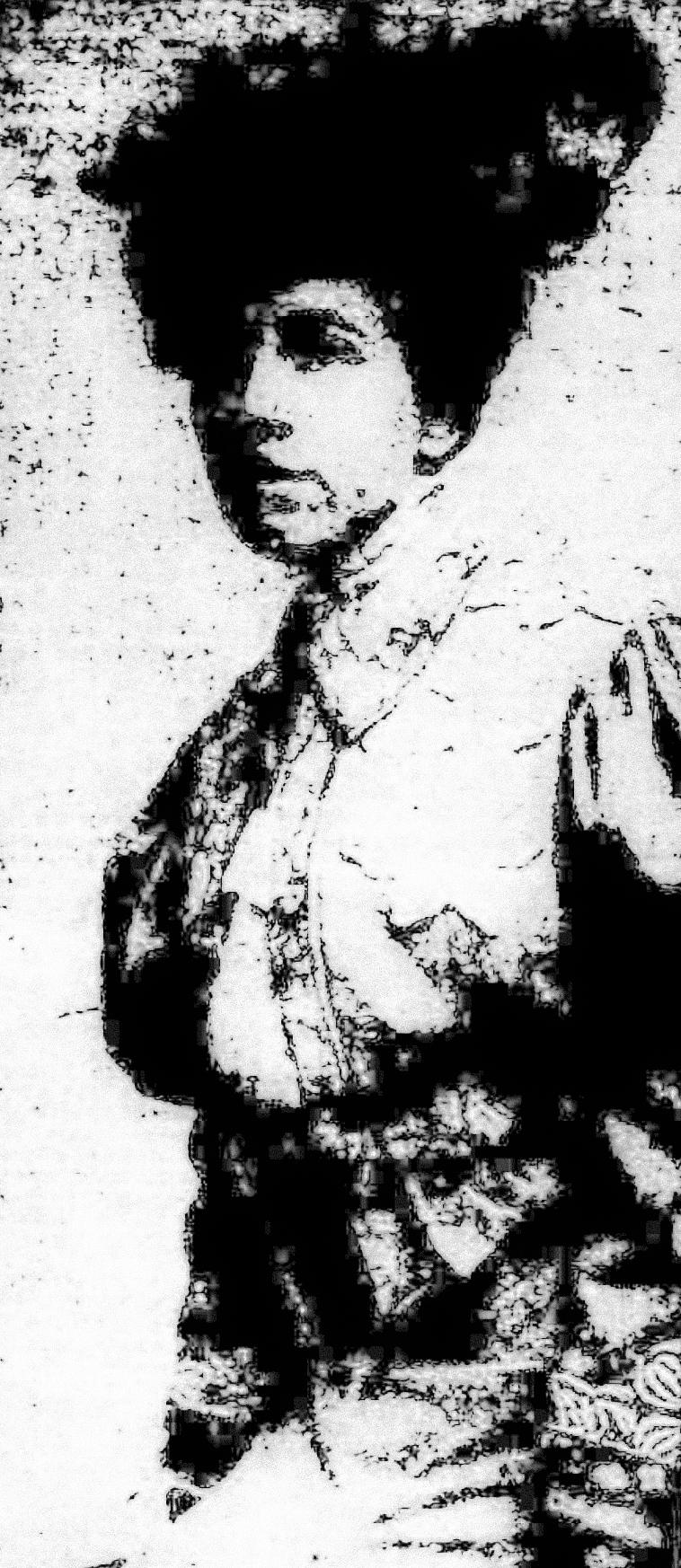
- Florence Maude Warner in 1905
- Born: December 15, 1878; South Dakota
- Died: June 2, 1926 (aged 47); Chicago
- Burial place: New York
- Occupations: inventor, company director
- Years active: 1890–1926
- Organization(s): Warner Research and Uniplate Inc.
- Known for: The Warner-Powrie process for colour photography
- Partner: John H. Powrie
- Parents: Festus Lorenzo Warner (father); Mary (née Wegel) (mother)

Florence Maude Warner (15 December 1878, South Dakota – 2 June 1926, Chicago) was an American inventor who developed colour photography processes with John H. Powrie.

== Early life ==
Florence Maude Warner was born on 15 December 1878, in an unknown location in South Dakota to parents Mary (née Wegel) of Manlius, and Festus Lorenzo Warner (born Massachusetts c.1843).

== Inventor ==
During her youth, Warner established a working partnership with John H. Powrie, an association that continued until her death, and the duo started their experiments in photographic technologies at Warner's house in Milwaukee.

== The Warner-Powrie process ==
The Warner-Powrie United States patent 802,471 Heliochrome Plate and the Process of Making the Same, filed 25 October 1901, and granted 24 October 1905 to John H. Powrie, was first publicly announced on Christmas Day 1905 in the St Louis Republic:

PROCESS OF PHOTOGRAPHING IN COLORS IS REALIZED AT LAST AFTER WORK OF TEN YEARS BY TWO SCIENTIFIC ENTHUSIASTS. The ambition of photographers of the world to photograph in colors has been realized by two scientific enthusiasts. Picture-taking in colors is at last a reality. It is possible, by the process which has been discovered by these men [sic], to take a picture of a flower bed and reproduce all the colors of nature on the negative...This discovery is the result of ten years of constant experiment and work by John H. Powrie and Miss Florence M. Warner, both of Chicago. Mr. Powrie is an expert photo-chemist, an untiring student and a man of scientific attainment. Miss Warner has been equally enthusiastic, and her thoughts have been, for the last ten years, concentrated upon the task of solving the problem of color photography—a task that has been essayed by nearly every photographic enthusiast since color work was attempted in 1869 by du Hauron. Mr. Powrie and Miss Warner have worked together in their laboratory...for ten years. Mr. Powrie conceived the process...Miss Warner finished the undertaking, and together they performed the work and experiments. Out of many failures...the color-photography problem is now solved...It has been placed upon the market—within the reach of the amateur as well as the professional photographer. Any day they may be satisfied regarding the quality of the color reproduction; but the question has been how to make it in better shape and for use by the amateur.

The invention was then presented internationally in the British Journal of Photography on 29 December 1905. In December 1906, the partners registered the company Uniplate Inc. with a capital of US$1,000.00.

In 1907, Warner, her mother Mary Warner, and Powrie went to London to participate in the first annual exhibition of the Society of Colour Photographers, at the Little Galleries of the British Journal of Photography in the Strand, where the Bath Chronicle reported that they presented prints from their Warner-Powrie process amongst Autochromes and others. For Edward John Wall, an expert in colour photography at the time who saw the exhibition in London, the process represented the future of colour photography, if it were marketed at affordable prices. That the process was being quickly taken up is evident in a Gloucester Journal report of a November 1907 meeting at the Blenheim Club at which F. Martin Duncan had shown insect and butterfly photographs made with an eight-second sunlight exposure on the Warner-Powrie plates. At another BJP event in mid-December Powrie showed projections to an audience impressed by their brightness.

The BJP, Photographic News, Nature, and also in Germany Albert von Obermayer in Photographische Korrespondenz in Vienna and in Jahrbuch für Photographie und Reproductionstechnik für 1908, reported that the method used the "Florence" chromatic plate, which consisted of a screen formed by thin parallel lines of green, red and blue colour printed on a common glass plate, which was then covered with panchromatic emulsion and exposed to the object.

In its December 1907 editorial, Photo-Era magazine lauded the new process:

The new Warner-Powrie system of color-photography...eliminates the reversal of the image, thereby greatly simplifying the process...negatives in complementary colors are made direct by one exposure in the ordinary camera on one plate, as in the Lumiére process, and that from these negatives an unrestricted number of positives in the true colors of nature may be printed on either glass or paper. This latter feature constitutes an advance in color-photography which is of the greatest importance.

The magazine explained the details of the invention as a development of the earlier Joly linear screen system by combining a fine, regular colour screen directly with the photographic emulsion to form a single plate usable in any ordinary camera. Their major technical advance was the ability to produce extremely fine red, green and blue transparent lines at 240–400 per centimetre—far finer than previous attempts and "reduced to a factory system calling for very little skilled labour"—embedded between the glass and a panchromatic emulsion, creating what they called the Florence Heliochromatic Screen-Plate in recognition of Florence Warner's essential role in the partnership with Powrie, assisting in laboratory work, providing financial support, and contributing sustained commitment that enabled the process to reach practical completion.

Their invention allowed the creation of full-tone negatives for three-colour printing, and the production of colour positives without registration difficulties. The plate’s transparency, lack of opaque interstices, and regular linear structure made it faster than other screen-plate methods. Crucially, the linear ruling permitted unlimited printing of positives on paper or colour separations from a single negative—something impossible with irregular grain screens such as Autochrome. Contemporary experts judged its transparencies more brilliant and its method simpler, more practical, and more widely applicable than any previous one-plate colour process. Powrie published in August 1907 on the application of their invention to plate making in the printing industry. The Washington Post in May 1908 carried the partners' news of an imminent roll-film version, and other reports show that developments continued to be made in 1909.

Dr. Johann George van Deventer, active 1879–1908, was a Dutch physicist trained at the Rijks-Universiteit Leiden, an institute with specialties in optical and thermal physics, where he received his doctorate in mathematics and natural sciences magna cum laude in 1879 for a dissertation on the absorption of radiant heat by powders. Van Deventer then was a teacher, then director, of mathematics and physics at the Gymnasium Koning Willem III in Batavia (Jakarta), before returning to the Netherlands and settling in Nijmegen, from whence he published “De Warner-Powrie kleurenphotographie” (1908), his principal surviving contribution to photographic science. This rigorous analysis of the little-understood Warner–Powrie colour process drew on his training as van Deventer reconstructed the method theoretically, corrected errors in British and American descriptions, and with no access to the materials, offered the most coherent and feasible technical explanation of the process available at the time. He asserts that "Powrie was actually the one who tackled the problem—he spent 10 years on it" having worked in the studio of the Barnes-Crosby Co. in Chicago, the largest photographic firm in the United States. Without direct evidence, van Deventer relegates Warner, "a longtime friend of [Powrie's] family" to the role of providing financial assistance, moral support, and regular assistance, in recognition of which "Powrie insisted on also linking her name to the method" with her name first.

== Later life and work ==
George Eastman became interested in colour photography from 1904, when Thacher Clarke was asked to seek new processes in Europe, and the company funded experiments with various unsuccessful technical attempts to develop a marketable colour photographic process over the next decade. Eastman did not take up the Warner-Powrie patent when it was released in 1905, but from October 1910, in Kodak's prototype colour laboratory, MIT graduate Emerson Packard, hoping to avoid infringement of the Autochrome process, built on Powrie and Warner’s work, but it came to nothing marketable. As Milanowski notes, colour photography inventors:

became the marketers of their materials and processes. History has shown that color experimenters do not make good businessmen, and even if these individuals had possessed any marketing prowess, a lucrative market had not yet formed for color photography.

In France in 1913 Rodolphe Berthon, though pursuing a lenticular additive process, was still investigating the Powrie-Warner colour process for its advantage of “the most remarkable transparency and brightness of the screen”, though at the sacrifice of colour saturation due to the minimal thickness of its tinted bichromate layers, as well as variability of colour reproduction making the reproducibility of the process unsatisfactory. Berthon added a procedure to the process in which plates were successively bathed in a solution of tannin and basic fuchsine. He did conclude that only mechanical methods, rather than the random Autochrome grain, could produce a consistent screen colour homogeneity and repeatability.

In 1914 John K. Powrie and Florence Warner worked for a few months in the chemical laboratory of Kodak Park, trying to improve their screen colour process but technical results remained unsatisfactory. That year, Herbert E. Ives in surveying "The Present Condition of Color Photography" remarks that "the Warner-Powrie [is] made by gelatin bichromate printing and subsequent dyeing. An advantage of the linear elements in the Warner-Powrie Screen is that the negative may be used for making structureless positives by a process of parallax printing.

A fire, the interruption of the supply of chemicals due to World War I, a successful suit by a debtor owed $54,168 and the death of Florence's mother in 1918, suspended the work of Warner's laboratory. In 1920 the partners' experiments were restarted in New York, where Florence established Warner Research. However, despite the good results achieved and the good reception among photography experts, a Warner-Powrie process was never commercially viable. Powrie presented a paper on their progress at the twenty-seventh annual convention of the American Photo-Engravers' Association held at the Hotel Sherman, Chicago, July 19–21, 1923.

Florence Warner's partnership with Powrie and her performance as director of Warner Research continued when they entered into collaboration with Warner Brothers (that they had the Warner name in common with Florence is coincidental) to apply the colour process in cinematography, and was active until her death after a brief illness in Chicago in 1926. Warner was buried in New York.

John Powrie continued his efforts to adapt their process to cinema. A large negative was necessary to achieve a sufficiently fine structure so film was exposed through the screen made by a photographic process with RGB rulings of 355 lines per centimetre (900 lines to the inch) on horizontal-travelling 47 mm wide panchromatic film, i.e. four times the area of a standard 35 mm movie frame. In processing, the dichromated gelatin was mordanted and dyed using successive washings-away of the dyed gelatin and the re-coating of gelatin to be dyed. The master was optically reduced to a standard vertical-traveling 35 mm film also with coloured rulings producing a tartan-pattern grid, too fine for the eye to register. Over 1927–1929 Powrie conducted correspondence with prominent spectroscopist William Frederick Ferdinand Meggers, and in a 1928 paper said that he had spent 8 years attempting to make the process work for cinema, but without any success in developing a commercial application.
