= Lucas Adams =

American actor (born 1993)

- Born: Lucas Brentley Adams; July 24, 1993 (age 33); Sherman, Texas, U.S.
- Occupation: Actor
- Years active: 2012–present
- Spouse: Shelby Wulfert (m. 2022)
- Children: 1

Lucas Brentley Adams (born July 24, 1993) is an American actor. He is best known for playing the role of Dr. Tripp Dalton Johnson on the NBC and Peacock soap opera Days of Our Lives (2017 to 2024). He was nominated for a Daytime Emmy Award for Outstanding Younger Actor in a Drama Series for his role on Days of Our Lives in 2018 and 2019.

== Early life ==
Adams was born in Sherman, Texas. The family relocated to Bells, Texas, when he was two years old. He has two older sisters. Both of his parents were college athletes. Adams grew up with aspirations of being a professional athlete or an actor. He earned all district honors for football, basketball and baseball in high school and was recruited out of high school for baseball. Adams planned on attending college if he received a full-scholarship, otherwise he would try acting instead. When school didn't offer what he wanted, Adams got his parents blessing to pursue acting and relocated to Los Angeles where his sister resided. Adams said it was a culture shock in comparison to living in a small town with one stop light and no crosswalks. His sister helped him get a job driving a U-Haul truck.

== Career ==
A few months after moving to Los Angeles, Adams landed a television commercial for Toyota Tundra. He appeared as Wesley in one episode of the CBS soap opera The Young and the Restless in 2012. Adams played Vincent in the film Closer to God: Jessica's Journey (2012). He appeared in the television film The Great Halloween Puppy Adventure (2012) (also titled A Halloween Puppy). He guest starred on Dexter, playing the title character's son, Harrison.

In 2013, Adams guest starred on Suburgatory. He played Johnny (age 15) in the film Red Wing (2013). Adams had a recurring role as Lou on True Blood in 2014. He guest starred on Grimm in 2015. He landed a recurring role on the Disney Channel sitcom Liv and Maddie, playing Josh Willcox from 2015 to 2017.

Adams had guest starring roles on Recovery Road, School of Rock, and The Thundermans in 2016. He played Steven in the horror film Wolves at the Door. In December 2016, it was announced that Adams would be joining the cast of the NBC soap opera Days of Our Lives as Tripp Dalton (later renamed Tripp Johnson). His first air date was March 23, 2017. He also played Brandon in the horror film Urban Myths in 2017.

He was nominated for a Daytime Emmy Award for Outstanding Younger Actor for his role on Days of Our Lives in 2018. He also received a nomination in the same category in 2019. Adams left Days of Our Lives for storyline dictated reasons, last airing August 27, 2019.

Adams played Major in the Shudder horror film Confessional. He starred with his Days castmate Paige Searcy in the Lifetime film Kidnapped by a Classmate (also titled Gone, Daughter Gone), airing in January 2020. In 2020, Adams played McCormick in American Pie Presents: Girls' Rules.

Adams returned to Days of Our Lives, first airing on September 4, 2020. In 2021, he also played Tripp in Days of Our Lives: A Very Salem Christmas, a holiday film streaming on Peacock. Adams left Days for a short time in 2022, but he appeared as Tripp in Days of Our Lives: Beyond Salem, a spin off series streaming on Peacock. In September 2025, it was announced he would return to The Young and the Restless in the role of Noah Newman. He debuted in the role on November 4.

== Personal life ==
Adams met actress Shelby Wulfert when they worked together on Liv and Maddie. They began dating in October 2015, announced their engagement in July 2021, and were married on October 15, 2022, at the Chateau Hiddenwood estate in Waxahachie, Texas. They welcomed their first child, a son, in February 2026.

He has a dog, Lando Auditore, who was named after Lando Calrissian from Star Wars and Ezio Auditore da Firenze from the video game Assassin's Creed.

== Filmography ==
Film performances
Year	Title	Role	Notes
2011	Big Feet	Tadd	Short film
2012	Closer to God: Jessica's Journey	Vincent	
2013	Red Wing	Johnny (age 15)	
2013	The Firebird	Alex	Short film
2014	Player of the Game	Jake	Short film
2016	Wolves at the Door	Steven	
2017	Urban Myths	Brandon	
2019	Confessional	Major	
2020	American Pie Presents: Girls' Rules	McCormick	
2021	Days of Our Lives: A Very Salem Christmas	Tripp Dalton	Peacock Original Movie

Television performances
Year	Title	Role	Notes	Ref.
2012	The Young and the Restless	Wesley	Episode: March 5, 2012	
2012	The Great Halloween Puppy Adventure	Nicky	Television film	
2012	Dexter	Harrison Morgan	Episode: "Do You See What I See?"	
2013	Victorious	Soccer Boy	TheSlap webisode: "Cat Interviews a Cute Soccer Boy"	
2013	Suburgatory	Cody	Episode: "Blowtox and Burlap"	
2013	Madden Girl	Party Boy	Television miniseries	
2014	True Blood	Lou	Episodes: "Jesus Gonna Be Here", "I Found You", "Fire in the Hole"	
2015	Grimm	Peter Bennett	Episode: "Bad Luck"	
2015–2017	Liv and Maddie	Josh Willcox	Recurring role: 12 episodes	
2016	Recovery Road	Benji	Episode: "The Art of the Deal"	
2016	School of Rock	Trey	Episode: "Freddy Fights for his Right to Party"	
2016	The Thundermans	Alexander	Episode: "Can't Spy Me Love"	
2016–2019	Those Who Can't	Donny	Recurring role: 3 episodes	
2017	Little Princesses	The Stealer	Episode: "The Stealer"	
2017–2024	Days of Our Lives	Tripp Dalton	Series regular Role held from March 23, 2017, to August 29, 2019; September 4, 2020, to June 15, 2022; October 14, 2022, to April 29, 2024	
2019	Betch	Leader Douche	Episode: "Chapter 7"	
2020	Kidnapped by a Classmate	Hunter	Television film	
2022	Days of Our Lives: Beyond Salem	Tripp Dalton	Chapter 2	
2025	The Young and the Restless	Noah Newman	Series regular; role held since November 4, 2025	

Video Game Performances
Year	Title	Role	Notes	Ref.
2011	Call of Duty: Modern Warfare 4	DMZ Team Leader	Voice	

== Awards and nominations ==
Year	Award	Category	Work	Result	Ref.
2018	Daytime Emmy Award	Outstanding Younger Actor in a Drama Series	Days of Our Lives	Nominated	
2019	Daytime Emmy Award	Outstanding Younger Actor in a Drama Series	Days of Our Lives	Nominated	
