= The World of Women =

1937 British television series

The World of Women was a British television series which aired in 1937 on the BBC. Aired in a 15-minute time-slot, the series featured women known for their social and/or artistic activities. The first episode aired 12 January 1937. Mary Field, known for her work on the Secrets of Nature films, appeared as the guest in one of the episodes.

None of the episodes are known to still exist. They aired live, and methods used to record live television did not exist until late 1947, and were used very rarely by the BBC until around 1953.
