= Sea Stories (TV series) =

British television series (1936–1937)

Sea Stories is a British television series which aired 1936 to 1937 on the BBC. It was one of the earliest series ever aired on television. It consisted of A.B. Campbell describing the personalities and places he had seen. The programs preceding and following it varied, for example one episode was preceded by Theatre Parade and followed by The World of Women, while another episode was preceded a mix of short variety segments and followed by Sophisticated Cabaret.

None of the episodes still exist, as methods to record live television did not exist until late 1947, and were used very rarely by the BBC until the mid-1950s.
