= The Strength and Agility of Insects =

- Screenshot from the film
- Directed by: F. Percy Smith
- Production company: Kineto
- Distributed by: Urban Trading Company
- Release date: 1911
- Running time: 3 mins 58 secs
- Country: United Kingdom
- Language: Silent

The Strength and Agility of Insects is a 1911 British short silent documentary film, directed by F. Percy Smith, featuring close-ups of houseflies and other insects secured and juggling various objects with their feet. The films in this series, which included The Acrobatic Fly (1910), "caused an absolute furore when they were first shown to the public," and, according to Jenny Hammerton of the BFI, Smith, whose stated intention "was of course to entertain the public, but also to demonstrate the strength and agility of those insects we might unthinkingly squash or swat when they settle on our lunch," "was forced to justify his methods in the press, guaranteeing that there was no trickery involved and certainly no cruelty."
