= The Cheese Mites =

1903 British film by F. Martin Duncan

- Screenshot from the film
- Directed by: F. Martin Duncan
- Produced by: Charles Urban
- Cinematography: F. Martin Duncan
- Production company: Charles Urban Trading Company
- Release date: August 1903
- Running time: 2.5 mins extant
- Country: United Kingdom
- Language: Silent

The Cheese Mites (1903) is a British short silent documentary film, produced by Charles Urban and directed by F. Martin Duncan.

== Plot ==
A gentleman is put off his lunch when he holds up a magnifying glass and sees a microscopic view of the cheese mites in his Stilton cheese sandwich.

== Production background ==
The film "was the sensation of the first public programme of scientific films in Britain shown at the Alhambra Music Hall in Leicester Square, London, in August 1903". According to Michael Brooke of BFI Screenonline, "its claim to being scientific lay in its being shot through a microscope, revealing to a lay audience sights that would normally only have been available to owners of microscopes."

== Preservation status ==
Duncan in the full version of The Cheese Mites

A complete copy which includes an opening sequence, featuring F. Martin Duncan as the gentleman, was discovered uploaded to YouTube under a different title, and has now been acquired by the British Film Institute. Previously only the sequence showing the cheese mites was known to have survived.
