= Hugh O'Connor (filmmaker) =

Canadian director and producer (1924–1967)

- Born: March 12, 1924; Fort William, Scotland
- Died: September 20, 1967 (aged 41); Jeremiah, Kentucky, U.S.A.
- Occupations: Director, producer
- Years active: 1956–1967

Hugh O'Connor (March 12, 1924 – September 20, 1967) was a Canadian director and producer who worked for the National Film Board of Canada (NFB). His best- known film is the ground-breaking In the Labyrinth (1967), but his promising career ended shortly after that film's release when he was murdered while filming in Kentucky.

He was a father to two daughters and one son from two different marriages. His first wife was Kathleen Taylor, they were married in December 1952. They had their first daughter, Ann Kerin O’Connor, 9 months later. Their son, Mark Taylor O’Connor, four years later. After their divorce, he was married to Claire Nöel, and together they had a daughter, Sophie O’Connor.

== Career ==
O'Connor joined the NFB in 1956 after, it is believed, working as a journalist. He was hired, by Tom Daly to head up the Science Film section of the NFB's Unit B. He began directly immediately, and began to be recognized as one of Canada's leading filmmakers. He was known for developing cutting-edge technology in his films, including the five-camera, five-screen film In the Labyrinth, one of the highlights of Montreal's Expo 67. The film split elements across five screens and also combined them for a mosaic of a single image. This inspired Canadian filmmaker Norman Jewison to apply similar techniques to The Thomas Crown Affair. In the Labyrinth was the earliest inspiration for the revolutionary IMAX film format.

== Death ==
In the late 1960s, journalists and filmmakers descended upon Appalachia to document the living conditions during the War on Poverty. This offended many residents, who objected to stereotyping and criticism by outsiders, as well as the tendency to show only the poor side of Appalachia.

Unaware of the hostility toward outsiders, O'Connor went to the mountains of eastern Kentucky while working on a documentary called US, which had been commissioned by the United States Department of Commerce to be shown at HemisFair '68 in San Antonio. It would depict life in the United States from early pioneering days to the present.

On the afternoon of September 20, 1967, O'Connor and his crew had completed shooting and were driving back to their hotel when they spotted a coal miner, still covered in coal dust, sitting on his front porch with his baby on his lap. They stopped and asked the man if they could film him; he agreed and they set up their cameras. This man was a renter, and his house was owned by Hobart Isom, a man who owned many houses which were in particularly bad condition. When Isom found the crew on the property, he ordered them to leave. They packed up their gear and began to walk to their car. As they neared the car, Isom, using a 1904 .38-caliber Smith & Wesson revolver, took aim and fired four times, first at the camera and then at O'Connor. One bullet hit O'Connor in the chest and he died immediately. Isom eventually pleaded guilty to involuntary manslaughter and was sentenced to 10 years in prison; he served one year.

The entire incident was documented by Elizabeth Barret in her 2000 film Stranger with a Camera, which aired on the PBS series P.O.V.

== Aftermath ==
O'Connor's murder was met with shock, horror and outrage. O'Connor's boss at the NFB, Colin Low was particularly surprised as O'Connor was always the "front man" for scouting locations, all over the world, as he had an engaging way of dealing with people.

Due to the sensational nature of the case, much was written about the murder and the trial; very little was written about O'Connor and no obituary appears to have been published. It is known that he left behind a 14-year-old daughter, a 10-year-old son and his wife, Claire, who died four years after the death of her husband.

== Filmography ==
All National Film Board of Canada

- The Winds of Weather - documentary short, 1957 - director, producer
- The Department Manager - documentary short, 1958 - director
- Birth of a Giant - documentary short, Perspective series 1957 - writer, director
- Islands of the Frozen Sea - documentary short, Perspective series 1958 - producer, co-director with Dalton Muir and Strowan Robertson
- Evidence for the Crown - documentary short, 1958 - director
- Tales Out of School - short film, 1958 - director
- The Face of the High Arctic - documentary short, Dalton Muir 1958 - producer
- High Arctic: Life on the Land - documentary short, Dalton Muir 1958 - producer
- Radiation - documentary short, 1959 - director, producer
- Interview with Linus Pauling - documentary, Joe Koenig 1960 - producer
- Life in the Woodlot - documentary short, Dalton Muir 1960 - producer
- Life and Radiation - documentary short, 1960 - producer, director
- Above the Timberline: The Alpine Tundra Zone - documentary short, J.V. Durden 1960 - producer
- Microscopic Fungi - documentary short, J.V. Durden 1960 - producer
- Trout Stream - documentary short, 1961 - producer, director
- Snow - documentary short, Barrie McLean 1961 - producer
- Above the Horizon - documentary short, 1964 - co-director, co-producer with Roman Kroitor
- The Edge of the Barrens - documentary short, Dalton Muir 1964 - producer
- The Persistent Seed - documentary short, Christopher Chapman 1964 - producer
- Magic Molecule - documentary short, 1964 - co-director with Christopher Chapman
- Paul-Émile Borduas - documentary short, Jacques Godbout 1964 - co-producer with Fernand Dansereau
- Ethiopian Mosaic - documentary short, 1967 - co-producer, co-director with Desmond Dew
- In the Labyrinth - short film, 1967 - co-director with Roman Kroitor and Colin Low

== Awards ==
Islands of the Frozen Sea (1958)

- Scholastic Teacher Magazine Annual Film Awards: Award of Merit, 1958

Radiation (1959)

- 12th Canadian Film Awards, Toronto: Certificate of Merit, Training and Instruction, 1960

Microscopic Fungi (1960)

- International Exhibition of Scientific Film, Buenos Aires: Diploma of Honor, 1964

Life in the Woodlot (1960)

- Salerno Film Festival, Salerno, Italy: Silver Cup of the Province of Salerno, 1961
- 13th Canadian Film Awards, Toronto: Best Film, Films for Children, 1961

Above the Horizon (1964)

- Electronic, Nuclear and Teleradio Cinematographic Review, Rome: Best Film in the Scientific Category, 1970
- International Survey of Scientific and Didactic Films, Padua, Italy: First Prize, Didactic Films
- Australian and New Zealand Association for the Advancement of Science (ANZAAS), Sydney: Orbit Award, 1966
- 18th Canadian Film Awards, Montreal: Best Film for Children, 1966
- International Scientific Film Festival, Lyon, France: Honorable Mention for Popularization of a Scientific Subject, 1969
- International Exhibition of Scientific Film, Buenos Aires: Diploma of Honor, 1966

Magic Molecule (1964)

- Columbus International Film & Animation Festival, Columbus, Ohio: Chris Award, Business and Industry 1964
- Yorkton Film Festival, Yorkton, Saskatchewan: Special Award, Industry, 1964
- Victoria Film Festival, Victoria, British Columbia: Best Industrial Film, 1964
- Festival of Technical and Scientific Films, Budapest: Second Prize, Documentary, 1964
- La Plata International Children's Film Festival, La Plata, Argentina: Silver Medal, 1966
- BFI London Film Festival, London: Third Prize, Industry, 1964
- International Labour and Industrial Film Festival, Antwerp: Diploma of Merit, Industrial or Technical Information Films, 1964

The Edge of the Barrens (1964)

- Yorkton Film Festival, Yorkton, Saskatchewan: Golden Sheaf Award for Best Film of the Festival, 1964
- Yorkton Film Festival, Yorkton, Saskatchewan: First Prize, Natural History, 1964
- Venice Film Festival, Venice: Second Prize, Children's Films, 1964
- Weyburn Film Festival, Weyburn, Saskatchewan: First Prize, 1965
- International Exhibition of Scientific Film, Buenos Aires: Special Mention, 1966
