= Red Wing (film) =

2013 film

- Directed by: Will Wallace
- Written by: Kathleen Orillion
- Produced by: Patricia L. Carpenter; Mark Rickard; Will Wallace
- Starring: Breann Johnson as Maddie Blanton; Glen Powell as Francis Riley; Joelle Carter as Verna Sexton; Bill Paxton as Jim Vernet; Luke Perry as Carl Blanton; Frances Fisher as Momma B; Mallory O’Donoghue as Gina Vernet; Austin Harris as Francis (age 9) Cathy Diane Tomlin as Isabelle Riley Niki Koss as Mary Ann Will Wallace as Larry Lucas Adams as Johnny (age 9) Jamie Gallagher as Kathy Andrew Fognani as Billy Hunter Wallace as Johnny (age 3) Jeff Plunk as Wade Meghan McGregor as Cindy Dylan Saccoccio as Ricky Sara Wallace as Aunt Betty
- Cinematography: Wyatt D. House
- Music by: Lorne Balfe
- Distributed by: Gravitas Ventures
- Release date: October 4, 2013
- Running time: 108 minutes
- Country: United States
- Language: English

Red Wing is a 2013 American Western film directed by Will Wallace and starring Breann Johnson, Glen Powell, Joelle Carter, Bill Paxton, Luke Perry and Frances Fisher. It is based on the novel François le Champi by George Sand. Terrence Malick served as the executive producer.

Much of the film was shot in Whitewright, Texas.
