= Birth of a Giant =

1957 Canadian short documentary film

- Title card
- Directed by: Hugh O'Connor
- Written by: Hugh O'Connor
- Produced by: David Bairstow
- Cinematography: Jean Roy
- Edited by: Tony Lower; David Green (sound)
- Production company: National Film Board of Canada
- Distributed by: Canadian Broadcasting Corporation; National Film Board of Canada
- Release date: November 24, 1957
- Running time: 29 minutes, 27 seconds
- Country: Canada
- Language: English

Birth of a Giant (Naissance d'un géant in French) is a 29-minute 1957 Canadian documentary film, directed by Hugh O'Connor and produced by the National Film Board of Canada (NFB) for the Canadian Broadcasting Corporation (CBC) television series, Perspective.

The film depicts the role of story of the conception, construction and testing of the Canadair Argus aircraft, designed as a maritime patrol and anti-submarine aircraft for the Royal Canadian Air Force (RCAF). The title is an acknowledgement, that at the time, the Argus was the largest aircraft ever built in Canada.

== Synopsis ==
In 1954, the RCAF issues specifications for a new maritime patrol and anti-submarine aircraft. In order to comply with the RCAF's requirements, the Canadair aircraft company in Montreal, begins a re-design of the Bristol Britannia airliner. A prototype of the giant aircraft begins to take shape alongside the other aircraft in production at the Canadair factory. As each individual component is designed and tested, the aircraft given the company designation, CL-28, proves to be a complex technological challenge. Many of the specialized parts are sent to sub-contractors who have to meet stringent timelines and quality standards. As problems arise, computer analysis is available to provide solutions. (Note: Very early computer technology involving punch cards, printouts and massive processors was shown.)

All through the construction process, representatives of the RCAF check the engineering mock-up as well as the first prototype Argus (coded VN-710) to ensure that the finished product meets their needs. When the prototype emerges from the assembly bay on day 175, it is newly christened as the "Argus". Company test pilots successfully carry out the maiden flight, the start of a lengthy period of testing. After years of planning, design and construction, the first Argus (20710) is accepted by the RCAF.

== Production ==
The first prototype Argus was the model for all the aerial shots in Birth of a Giant with its maiden flight, the climax of the film. Employees at Canadair, during the rollout and first flight, were able to gauge, for the first time, the immense size of the "giant", Canada's largest aircraft at the time.

Birth of a Giant was part of the NFB's series of documentary short films for the CBC TV series Perspective that ran from 1956–58. Each half-hour program, produced by the National Film Board included both documentaries and dramatic productions. Most episodes concerned contemporary issues in Canada, although several involved international incidents or topics such as life in Haiti. A small number of the Perspective series were historical reconstructions. Generals Wolfe and Montcalm at the Battle of the Plains of Abraham was one example.

A close working relationship with Canadair allowed the NFB to chronicle the development of the Argus. Many of the key staff in the company played their parts as themselves, while the aircraft went through its gestation period from 1954 to rollout in 1956 and first test flight on March 28, 1957. The aerial sequences included footage shot from accompanying aircraft as well as from inside the Argus as it went through its paces during testing.

== Reception ==
Birth of a Giant was primarily made-for-television, but after broadcast on November 24, 1957 on the CBC, was made available on 16 mm, to schools, libraries and other interested parties. The film was also made available to film libraries operated by university and provincial authorities. Excerpts from Birth of a Giant appeared in other NFB productions, including The Golden Age (1959).

Although available from the National Film Board either online or as a DVD, Birth of a Giant is now largely forgotten. A recent analysis emphasized the historical value of the film. "For those interested in the formative years of the Cold War and the Canadian aircraft that figured so prominently in it ..."
