= A Canine Sherlock Holmes =

1912 British film by Stuart Kinder

- Film poster
- Directed by: Stuart Kinder
- Produced by: Charles Urban Trading Company
- Starring: Urbanora, A Canine Sleuth
- Distributed by: Charles Urban Trading Company
- Release date: December 1912
- Country: UK
- Language: Silent...English intertitles

A Canine Sherlock Holmes is a 1912 English silent short film crime drama directed by Stuart Kinder and produced and released by Charles Urban Trading Company. The film starred a canine film actor called Spot, the Urbanora dog.

== The Director ==
There is almost no information on the director of the film, Stuart Kinder. He began directing in 1911 and did some screen writing as well. A query on findagrave lists two people with the name Stuart Kinder, an American baby born and died in 1923 and a British Sgt. Stuart Whitehead Kinder who was killed in Belgium in 1915 during WW1. The latter Kinder is suspected of being the director Kinder who speculatively went off and joined the war effort. Director Kinder's IMDb filmography ends about the time Sgt Kinder is killed at Belgium with one film remaining for release in 1916. Sgt Kinder was 27 years old at his death which gives him a birth year of around 1887 or 1888.

== Cast ==
- Spot, The Urbanora Dog
