= Peter Martin Duncan =

English palaeontologist (1824–1891)

Peter Martin Duncan FRS (20 April 1821 – 28 May 1891) was an English palaeontologist.

== Biography ==
Duncan was born at Twickenham on 20 April 1821, his father, Peter King-Duncan, a descendant of an old Scottish family, being a leather merchant; his mother was daughter of Captain R. Martin, R.N., of Ilford, Essex. He received his earlier education first at the grammar school, Twickenham, next at Nyon, by the lake of Geneva, after which he was apprenticed in 1840 to a medical practitioner in London.

In 1842, Duncan entered on the medical side at King's College, London, passing through it with distinction, and being elected an associate in 1849, after graduating as M.B. at the university of London in 1846. For a time he was assistant to Dr. Martin at Rochester, and in 1848 took a practice at Colchester. Here he was also active in municipal affairs, and in 1857 was elected mayor, holding the office for a second time. The natural history and archaeology of the district also greatly attracted him, and the arrangement of the town museum was largely his work. His first scientific paper, Observations on. the Pollen Tube, was published in 1856 in the Proceedings of the Edinburgh Botanical Society, but it was soon followed by others. In 1860 he removed to Blackheath, thus obtaining more time for science, and devoting himself especially to the study of corals.

More complete freedom was obtained by election to the professorship of geology at King's College in 1870, of which he became a fellow in the following year, and shortly afterwards he was appointed professor of geology at Cooper's Hill College. In 1877 he settled in London near Regent's Park, residing there till 1883, when he removed to Gunnersbury.

Duncan became a Fellow of the Geological Society in 1849, was secretary from 1864 to 1870, and president 1876 to 1878, receiving the Wollaston Medal in 1881. He was president of the geological section of the British Association at the meeting in 1879; was also a fellow of the Zoological and the Linnean Societies, holding office in both, and an active member of the Microscopical Society, being president from 1881 to 1883. He was elected F.R.S. on 4 June 1868.

Duncan's industry was so unflagging that he got through a great amount of work, of both a popular and a scientific character, besides lecturing and examining. He was editor of Cassell's Natural History (6 vols. 1876-82), to which he contributed several important articles. He wrote a Primer of Physical Geography (1882); a small volume of biographies of botanists, geologists, and zoologists entitled Heroes of Science (1882); another on The Sea-shore (1879); and an Abstract of the Geology of India, 1875, which reached a third edition in 1881; besides contributing to various periodicals, assisting in preparing the third edition of Griffith and Henfrey's Micrographic Dictionary (2 vols. 1875), and revising the fourth edition of Lyell's Student's Elements of Geology (1885).

His separate scientific papers are not less than a hundred in number, and his 'Supplement' to the Tertiary and Secondary Corals forms a volume in the publications of the Palaeontographical Society. The 'Tertiary Echinoidea of India' (of which he was joint author) appeared in Palæontologia Indica, 1882-6.

He made a special study of the corals and echinids, taking also much interest in the ophiurids, sponges, and protozoa, regarding all questions from the point of view not only of the philosophical zoologist, but also of one who applied the distribution of species to elucidate ancient physical geography. He described the fossil coral fauna of Malta, Java, Hindustan, Australia, Tasmania, and the West Indies, the echinids of Sind, and of other countries. The results of these researches were summed up in two very valuable papers, 'Revision of the Madreporaria,' published by the Linnean Society in August 1884, and ' Revision of the Genera and Great Groups of the Echinoidea,' published by the same society in 1889. Others papers on the 'Physical Geology of Western Europe during Mesozoic and Camozoic Times, elucidated by the Coral Fauna,' on 'The Formation of Land Masses', and the remarkable paper 'On Lakes and their Origin', were also important contributions to science.

Duncan's health began to fail about two years prior to his death, which closed a painful illness on 28 May 1891. He was buried in Chiswick churchyard.

== Family ==
He was twice married: in 1851 to Jane Emily Cook, and in 1869, not long after her decease, to Mary Jane Emily Liddel Whitmarsh, who survived him with one son by her. Four sons and seven daughters by the first marriage also survived him. His son Francis became a zoologist, writing many popular works of natural history and making pioneering natural history films for producer Charles Urban in the 1900s.
