= Cake: A Wedding Story =

- Directed by: Will Wallace
- Written by: George Langworthy; Iain Weatherby
- Produced by: Will Wallace; Jeffrey Travis; Conroy Kanter; Mike Hoy; David Freid; Matthew S. Harrison; Sara Gravrock
- Music by: Geno Lenardo; Thomas Dawson Jr.
- Release date: March 18, 2007
- Running time: 93 minutes
- Country: United States
- Language: English

Cake: A Wedding Story is a 2007 comedy film directed by Will Wallace. The film hit the festival circuit in March 2007 with its world premiere at The Other Venice Film Festival on March 18, followed by a March 24 bow at the 2007 AFI Dallas International Film Festival.

== Plot ==
When two star-crossed lovers, set on eloping, are forced into having a big wedding, the bride develops a plan of her own. Unfortunately, the groom is not privy to the plan. Meanwhile, family and friends start to take sides at a reception for a wedding that never took place.

== Cast ==
- G. W. Bailey as Howard Canter
- Thomas Calabro as Bernard
- William Zabka as Sam
- Catherine Anderson Martin as Juliet Willoughby
- Adam Green as Felix Canter
- Mary Ellen Trainor as Jane Andrews
- Will Wallace as Ted Andrews
- Joe Estevez as Ken Willoughby
- Kerry Wallum as brother in law
- Dominic Scott Kay as Ryan
- Burton Gilliam as Judge
- Ann Cusack as Celeste
- Joe Stevens as Bip Saxton
- Becky Jane Romine as Gretchen Willoughby
- Marjorie Clifton as Liz Willoughby
- Craig Syracusa as Alex
- Matt Pletcher as Father Matthew (as Matthew S. Harrison)
- Teresa Castle as Kathy
- Sara Gravrock as Penny
- Alexis Ashley as Patience
- Luke Coffee as Jimmy Z
- Jason Manns as Bret
- Nikki Boyer as Nurse
- Bob Farster as Art
- Tom McCafferty as Mike
- Brad MacDonald as Tom
- Brave Matthews as 1 Year Old Stud's Dad
- Nick Pellegrino as Rabbi
- Sara Gibbons as Cat
- Lily Asinovsky as Jeanne
