= Will Wallace =

American film director and actor

- Born: United States
- Occupations: Film director, actor

Will Wallace is an American film director and actor. He directed Spanish Fly, Red Wing, ‘’Trafficked’’ and Cake: A Wedding Story.

== Early life ==
Wallace graduated from Kent School in 1984.

== Career ==
As an actor, Will Wallace received his first role playing a flight attendant opposite of Shirley MacLaine in The Evening Star in 1996. He had a number of guest starring roles in television shows such as, Beverly Hills, 90210 in 1998 where he played Barry. The following year he was cast in Baywatch in 1999 where he played Sam. That same year he was cast as Lieutenant Chadway in Pensacola: Wings of Gold.

In 1998, Wallace booked the role of Private Hoke in Terrance Malick’s film, The Thin Red Line. In 2001, he played Bill Carpenter, husband to Laura Dern’s character Randy in the movie I Am Sam.

In 2013, Will Wallace produced and directed Red Wing, which was an adaptation from the French novella François le Champi by George Sand. It is set in a small town in Texas. In the film, a young boy is taken in by a foster family and grows up to fall in love with his foster mother. It was released by Warner Brothers. Wallace was awarded the first Key to the City of Corsicana, Texas on October 18, 2018 after producing the film Warning Shot in the city.
