= Fight for the Dardanelles =

- Directed by: F. Percy Smith
- Produced by: Charles Urban
- Edited by: Charles Urban
- Release date: 1915
- Country: United Kingdom
- Language: Silent

Fight for the Dardanelles (1915) is a British silent documentary film, directed by F. Percy Smith and produced and edited by Charles Urban.

Percy Smith was known as a recorder of nature. He was a pioneer in the field of scientific documentaries. During World War I, however, he used his talents to support the Allied war effort. He shot aerial views of battlefields for British forces and made several animated films. One such was Fight for the Dardanelles.

The film uses stop-frame animation to create maps on the screen, and showed the then-current military situation in the Dardanelles, using various maps to assist understanding. Small cardboard cut-outs show the deployment of men and ships. Intertitles explain tactics, and shelling explosions are illustrated by clouds of cotton wool.

The techniques used in the film are considered primitive today; however, they satisfied a need at the time for details of the war. The film is currently available in 16mm film format.
