= David Hackenberg =

American commercial beekeeper

David Hackenberg is an American commercial beekeeper who started Hackenberg Apiaries which runs beehives in several American states.

Hackenberg witnessed the first case of what was going to be known as Colony Collapse Disorder (CCD) in November 2006 and reported it publicly in February 2007.

Hackenberg has been featured in two documentaries about CCD – Vanishing of the Bees and Colony: the Endangered World of Bees. He has represented the beekeeping industry in front of Congress on issues concerning pesticides and received the President's award from the American Beekeeping Federation in 2008 for bringing the plight of the honeybee to light in the world.
