= The Acrobatic Fly =

1910 film by F. Percy Smith

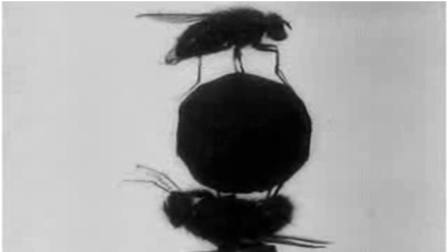
- Screenshot from the film
- Directed by: F. Percy Smith
- Production company: Kineto
- Distributed by: Charles Urban Trading Company
- Release date: 1910
- Running time: 3 minutes
- Country: United Kingdom
- Language: Silent

The Acrobatic Fly (1910)

The Acrobatic Fly (also known as The Balancing Bluebottle) is a 1910 British short silent documentary film, directed by F. Percy Smith, featuring close-ups of a housefly secured to the head of a match and juggling objects with its feet. The film, "is one of a series of Smith films on similar subjects around this time," and according to Mark Duguid of the BFI is, "near identical to, though briefer than, a sequence in his 1911 release The Strength and Agility of Insects."
