= Vanishing of the Bees =

2009 documentary film

- Theatrical release poster
- Directed by: George Langworthy, Maryam Henein
- Written by: Maryam Henein, George Langworthy, James Erskine
- Produced by: George Langworthy, Maryam Henein
- Cinematography: George Langworthy
- Edited by: William Gazecki
- Music by: Brian McBride (musician)
- Distributed by: Dogwoof Pictures
- Release date: 9 October 2009
- Running time: 87 minutes
- Country: United Kingdom
- Language: English
- Budget: $500,000

Vanishing of the Bees is a 2006 documentary film by Hive Mentality Films & Hipfuel Films, directed by George Langworthy and Maryam Henein and released in the United Kingdom in October 2009. The story is centered on the sudden disappearance of honey bees from beehives around the world, caused by the poorly understood phenomenon known as colony collapse disorder or CCD. Although the film does not draw any firm scientific conclusions as to the precise cause or causes of CCD, it does suggest a link between neonicotinoid pesticides and CCD.

The UK cinema release of the film was supported by The Co-operative Group.

== Cast ==
- David Hackenberg as himself
- Michael Pollan as himself
- Simon Buxton as himself
- Emilia Fox as narrator (UK release)
- Elliot Page (then known as Ellen Page) as narrator (US release)

== Reception ==
The film was first released in the UK with a British narration by Emilia Fox and received mixed reviews from critics, achieving a rating of 62 percent on Rotten Tomatoes based on 13 reviews, with an average rating of 5.3/10. Filmstar called Vanishing of the Bees "The most important documentary film since An Inconvenient Truth. And Stuart McGurk of The Sunday Times wrote that while the "subject is serious", and this film was "well intentioned and urgent", it was "let down by hammy narration, [and] a made-for-TV budget". Philip French of The Observer called it a "serious, didactic, rather rambling documentary [that] features some good, decent people". He added that "The blame falls principally on pesticides (which began when chemical warfare techniques were switched to farming), monoculture (ie, the widespread specialisation in single crops), genetic engineering and the world's changing landscape. Governments, the film charges, are listening more closely to the producers of chemicals than to beekeepers."

The film was then re-released in the US with a new edit and narration by Elliot Page (then known as Ellen Page). The film went on to win best documentary from the Idyllwild International Festival of Cinema and the Cosmic Cine Film Festival.
