= To Demonstrate How Spiders Fly =

1909 film by F. Percy Smith

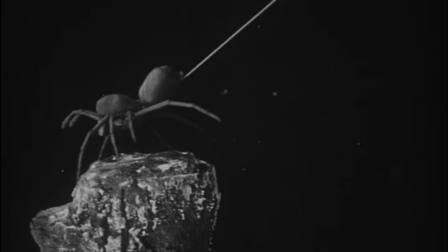
- Screenshot from the film
- Directed by: F. Percy Smith
- Production company: Kineto
- Distributed by: Charles Urban Trading Company
- Release date: 1909
- Running time: 58 secs
- Country: United Kingdom
- Language: Silent

To Demonstrate How Spiders Fly is a 1909 British animated short silent documentary film, directed by F. Percy Smith, featuring a close-up of an animated model spider throwing its silken thread to take to the air. The film features "the first of several animated creatures to appear in Smith's films", and according to Jenny Hammerton of BFI Screenonline was made in the belief, "that he could cure people of their fear of spiders by showing them blown up images of their eight legged foes on the cinema screen."
