= Secrets of Nature =

1922–1933 British documentary series

Secrets of Nature was a British short black-and-white documentary film series, consisting of 144 films produced between 1922 and 1933 by British Instructional Films, which filmmaker, historian and critic Paul Rotha described in 1930 as "the sheet anchor of the British film industry". A second series of films from the same team, under the title Secrets of Life and backed by Gaumont-British, followed between 1934 and 1947.

== History ==
The Secrets of Nature series was initiated in 1922 by Harry Bruce Woolfe, a former film distributor who had established himself with successful dramatised documentaries of the First World War, such as Zeebrugge and Mons, prior to setting up British Instructional Films in 1919 with the ambition of creating popular informational films. He recruited F. Percy Smith, who had established himself alongside fellow film pioneer F. Martin Duncan on the Urban Science series for Charles Urban before the war, to head up the series. Woolfe and Smith were joined by Natural History Museum curator W. P. Pycraft, ornithologist Edgar Chance, bird photographer Walter Higham, naturalist Charles Head, fellow Charles Urban Trading Company alumni H. M. Lomas of A Trip through British North Borneo (1907), and Woolfe's old friend, ornithologist and natural history cinematography pioneer Oliver G. Pike, who had established himself before the war with In Birdland (1907) and St Kilda, its People and its Birds (1908). He also obtained assistance from the entomologist Harold Maxwell-Lefroy.

In 1929 former schoolteacher Agnes Mary Field, who had joined British Instructional Films in 1926 as its education manager and quickly learned all aspects of film production, took over from Percy Smith as editor of the series, in order to give him more time to concentrate on his photography, and lead the series into the sound era.

== Films ==
=== The Cuckoo's Secret ===
A 1922 British 17-minute short black-and-white silent documentary film, produced by British ornithologist Edgar Chance and shot by nature documentary pioneer Oliver G. Pike, featuring the nesting habits of the common cuckoo, which changed public perception of how the birds reproduce. Chance asked local children to watch nests around Pound Green Common so he could work out the ones the cuckoo was most likely to visit next and thus instruct Pike as to where to position his cameras to catch the best shots. The resulting footage provided the first documented proof that the birds lay their eggs directly in the nests of the species they parasitise, rather than laying them on the ground and carrying them to the nest, and inaugurated the new film series. The film was included on the 2010 BFI DVD Secrets of Nature: Pioneering Natural History Films.

=== The Battle of the Ants ===
A 1922 British 12-minute short black-and-white silent documentary film, directed and shot by Geoffrey Barkas, featuring the conflict between two colonies of wood ants joined by a piece of tiber laid across a moat at a zoological garden. The film was included on the 2010 BFI DVD Secrets of Nature: Pioneering Natural History Films.

=== Fathoms Deep Beneath the Sea ===
A 1922 British 13-minute short black-and-white silent documentary film, shot by H. M. Lomas and edited by W. P. Pycraft, featuring Conger, octopus, wrasse, starfish, John Dory, pipefish, shrimp, prawn, sea robin and spider crab filmed at the Marine Biological Association in Plymouth. The film was included on the 2010 BFI DVD Secrets of Nature: Pioneering Natural History Films.

=== Skilled Insect Artisans ===
A 1922 British 9-minute short black-and-white silent documentary film, directed by Edgar Chance, featuring the life cycles of the ailanthus silkmoth and the red admiral butterfly, which according to Adam Dodd of BFI Screenonline was made at the time rayon was emerging as a man-made alternative to natural silk and anthropomorphised the insects in terms of their behavioural resemblance to human activities. The film was included on the 2010 BFI DVD Secrets of Nature: Pioneering Natural History Films.

=== The Sparrow-Hawk ===
A 1922 British short black-and-white silent documentary film, produced and shot by Charles W. R. Knight and edited by W. P. Pycraft, featuring the life-cycle of the Eurasian sparrowhawk.

=== The White Owl ===
A 1922 British 12-minute short black-and-white silent documentary film, compiled by W. P. Pycraft and shot by Oliver G. Pike, featuring a mother barn owl nicknamed Strix. The film was included on the 2010 BFI DVD Secrets of Nature: Pioneering Natural History Films.

=== Busy Bees ===
A 1926 British 11-minute short black-and-white silent documentary film featuring bumble bee, mason bee and leafcutter bee. The film was included on the 2010 BFI DVD Secrets of Nature: Pioneering Natural History Films.

=== Floral Co-operative Societies ===
A 1927 British 12-minute short black-and-white silent documentary film, directed and shot by F. Percy Smith, featuring the sexual elements of pollination in dandelion, globe thistle, daisy, cornflower, carline thistle and everlastings. The film was included on the 2010 BFI DVD Secrets of Nature: Pioneering Natural History Films.

=== The Plants of the Pantry ===
A 1927 British 13-minute short black-and-white silent documentary film, directed and shot by F. Percy Smith, featuring stop motion photography, micro-cinematography and animated sequences of mould, growing on household food such as cheese, spreading in flower-like patterns described by Total Film as "hypnotic, like a living lava lamp pulsing across the screen." "This extraordinary work of art and science, beautifully entwined," is described by Luke McKernan of The Bioscope, "as close to that of avant garde animators of the period as it is to the plain exposition of science lecture." The film was included on the 2010 BFI DVD Secrets of Nature: Pioneering Natural History Films.
