= George Langworthy =

American film director, producer and writer

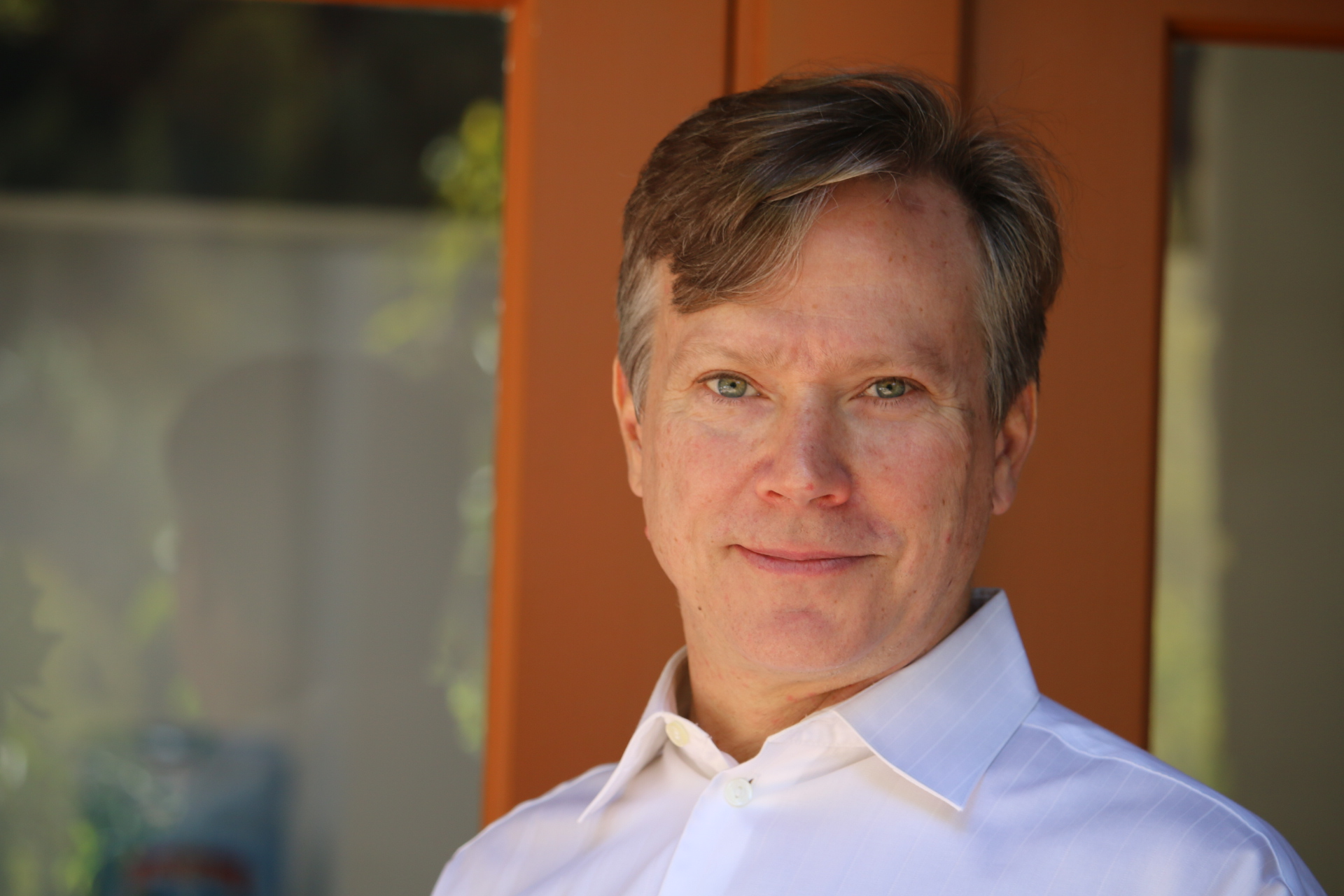
- Langworthy in 2016
- Education: Rice University
- Occupations: Director; Screenwriter; Film Producer; Cinematographer
- Notable work: Cake: A Wedding Story; Vanishing of the Bees
- Title: Filmmaker
- Website: georgelangworthy.com

George Langworthy is an American film director, producer and writer. He is best known for his work on Cake: A Wedding Story (2007) and Vanishing of the Bees (2009).

== Early life and education ==
Langworthy attended Rice University and spent his senior year on a scholarship to Trinity College, Cambridge University. While a student at Cambridge, he wrote and performed sketches with the Footlights comedic troupe. He received an M.F.A. in Screenwriting as a fellow in the Michener Center for Writers at the University of Texas.

== Career ==
Langworthy began his career in 1993, as a member of the editorial staff of American Heart, a drama film starring Jeff Bridges and directed by Martin Bell.

While working on his M.F.A., he served as the cinematographer for the biographical documentary Janis Joplin Slept Here, featuring Richard Linklater and Clifford Antone and awarded Best Documentary at the 1994 Houston International Film Festival.

In 1996, he directed a 12-minute comedy entitled Breezeway. The short film premiered at the Sundance Film Festival and was broadcast on PBS, the BBC and Canal +.

In 2002, Langworthy filmed and produced videos of live performances of bands such as The White Stripes, Devo and No Doubt.

In 2007, Langworthy co-wrote the screenplay for Cake: A Wedding Story with fellow Cambridge University alumni, Iain Weatherby. The film was directed by Will Wallace and won the award for Best Comedy Feature Film in the Other Venice Film Festival.

In 2009, he served as the director, producer, writer and cinematographer for the 90-minute environmental documentary Vanishing of the Bees. The film was released in the U.K. on October 9, 2009 and re-released in the U.S. with a new edit which was narrated by Elliot Page. The documentary received the best documentary award at the Idyllwild International Festival of Cinema, the Cosmic Cine Film Festival and the Ecocup Film Festival.

In 2019, Langworthy produced, wrote and edited the documentary Big Fur, which premiered at the Slamdance Film Festival. The film secured a distribution deal with 1091 Pictures, and has earned a 100% approval rating on Rotten Tomatoes based on 14 reviews.

== Filmography ==
Year	Title	Functioned as					Notes
Year	Title	Director	Producer	Writer	Cinematographer	Editor	Notes
1994	Janis Joplin Slept Here				Yes		Documentary
1995	Skeletons	Yes	Yes	Yes		Yes	
1997	Breezeway	Yes	Yes	Yes		Yes	
2007	Cake: A Wedding Story			Yes			
2009	Vanishing of the Bees	Yes	Yes	Yes	Yes		Documentary
2009	Who Killed the Honeybee		Yes		Yes		Documentary
2019	Big Fur		Yes	Yes	Yes	Yes	Documentary
