= Mary Field (producer) =

British film producer and director (1896–1968)

Mary Field OBE
- Mary Field, 1954.
- Born: Agnes Mary Field; 24 February 1896; Wimbledon, London, England
- Died: 23 December 1968 (aged 72); Worthing, West Sussex, England
- Other names: Mary Hankin; Agnes Mary Hankin
- Education: Bedford College; Institute of Historical Research (MA)
- Occupations: Producer; director

Agnes Mary Field OBE (married name Hankin; 24 February 1896 – 23 December 1968), known professionally as Mary Field, was a British film producer and director, particularly associated with documentary, educational, and children's films.

== Early life and education ==
Agnes Mary Field was born in Wimbledon, Surrey, on 24 February 1896, the second daughter of Evelyn Lucy Daniel and Ernest Field, a solicitor. She attended Surbiton High School and Bedford College, London. She earned a master of arts from the Institute of Historical Research with a distinction in Commonwealth history.

== Career ==
Field joined British Instructional Films in 1926, as its education manager. She went on to work for Gaumont. In 1928, she took over from F. Percy Smith and writing, directing, and editing the Secrets of Nature , a short black-and-white documentary film series, consisting of 144 films produced by British Instructional Films, with titles including "The Private Life of a Gull", "Plants of the Underworld", and "Mighty Atoms". She traveled to the Farne Islands to film birds, and made another film at the London Zoo. The timing of her career meant that she was one of the first British women to be an established, professional film director and producer, and she oversaw the transition to sound in instructional films.

In 1944, she created and became executive producer of the Children's Film Division of J. Arthur Rank, remaining until the division closed in 1950. She worked on children's matinées, undertook advisory work, toured the commonwealth in 1954, and was a consultant for UNESCO's Centre of Films for Children. In 1950, she visited Australia for six weeks, on a lecture tour sponsored by the Victorian Council for Children's Films and Television. She returned to Australian in 1954. In 1956, she wrote an article, "Children's Taste in Films", for the Quarterly of Film Radio and Television. She was billed as "the western world's foremost authority on films and television for children" when she toured Canada for four weeks in 1960.

She was made a CBE in 1951. In 1954, she was awarded an OBE for her services to educational and children's film. From 1950, she served on the British Board of Film Censors.

== Personal life ==
Field was a Soroptimist and a founder member of SI Greater London Club, which was chartered in 1923. In 1950, she became President of the 90,000 strong British arm of the International Federation of Business and Professional Women, succeeding Caroline Haslett in the role. She married Gerald Hankin, a Ministry of Education official in 1944 but was widowed in 1952.

She died on 23 December 1968, aged 72 years, in Worthing.

== Publications ==
- Secrets of Nature, Etc. [On the Making of Natural-history Films. With Plates.] (Faber & Faber 1934). Co-authored with Percy John Delf Smith.
- Good Company: The story of the children’s entertainment movement in Great Britain 1943 - 1950 (Longmans Green, 1952).
