= Charles Urban Trading Company =

Early 20th century film company

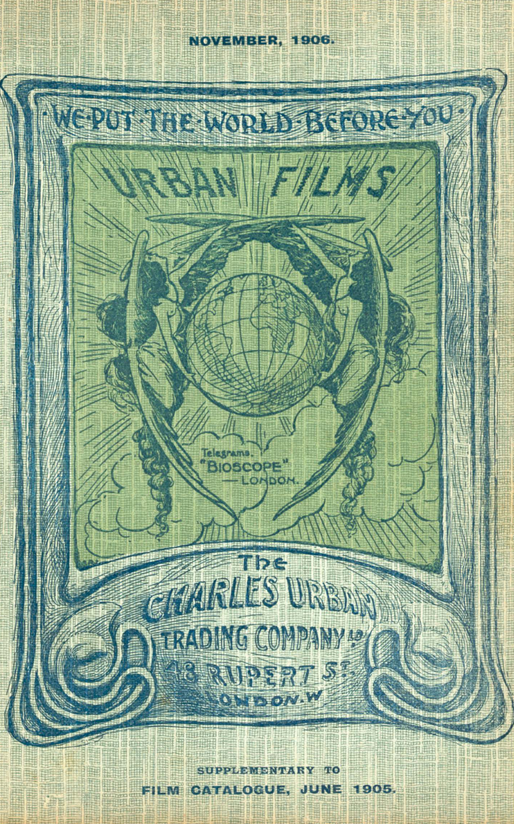
November, 1906 film catalog

The Charles Urban Trading Company (CUTC) specialised in travel, educational and scientific films. It was formed in 1903 in London by the Anglo-American film producer Charles Urban, who struck out on his own after five years at the Warwick Trading Company. The slogan of the Charles Urban Trading Company was 'We Put the World Before You'.

The company made its name with coverage of the Russo-Japanese War of 1904-5 from Joseph Rosenthal (with the Japanese) and George Rogers (with the Russians). Other notable cameramen working for Urban were Charles Rider Noble (filming in the Balkans), H.M. Lomas (Malaya, Borneo, hunting films), John Mackenzie (the Balkans), mountaineer F. Ormiston-Smith (Switzerland, Sweden), and the naturalists F. Martin Duncan and F. Percy Smith.

The CUTC also made fiction films, including several science fiction and trick films made by Walter R. Booth. Charles Urban ceased to have any connection with the company (beyond his name being used) after 1910. It ceased production during the First World War.

A 1957 copy of the film shot by the Charles Urban Trading Company of the 1906 Warwick Pageant in the grounds of Warwick Castle was deposited some time ago in the Warwickshire County Record Office, and was transferred to DVD in 2007.

== Films ==
- A Canine Sherlock Holmes
- The Acrobatic Fly
- To Demonstrate How Spiders Fly
- The Clown and His Donkey
- The Third Round
- The Cheese Mites
- Willie's Magic Wand
