= F. Percy Smith =

British nature documentary pioneer (1880–1945)

- Percy Smith
- Born: 12 January 1880; London, England, UK
- Died: 24 March 1945 (aged 65); Southgate, Middlesex, England, UK
- Other name: Frank P. Smith
- Occupations: naturalist, photographer, microscopist, film maker, animator

Frank Percy Smith (12 January 1880–24 March 1945) was a British naturalist and early nature documentary pioneer, who explored time-lapse photography, microphotography, microcinematography, underwater cinematography and animation.

== Biography ==
Percy Smith was the son of Francis David Smith (1854-1918) and Ada Blaker (born 1856). An only child, Smith was working as a clerk for the British Board of Education by age 14. The job was uninteresting but sustained his interests in photography and microscopy. In 1899, at age 19, he joined the Quekett Microscopical Club, within five years becoming editor of their journal (1904 to 1910). He made many research contributions of his own, primarily on spiders, his speciality. To supplement his income, Smith sold slides and gave natural history talks, accompanied by magic lantern displays of his own painted graphics. In 1907 he married Kate Louise Ustonson (1881-1959) who, along with Phyllis Bolté, would assist in his film-making.

His close-up photography of a bluebottle caught the attention of film producer Charles Urban, who established the firm Kineto in 1907 to create scientific and non-fiction films. Urban provided Smith with his first film camera, the result being the short The Balancing Bluebottle (1908). Smith's first public screening was in September or October 1908, at Palace Theatre, London. Smith subsequently made To Demonstrate How Spiders Fly (1909) and The Acrobatic Fly (1910) before joining the Charles Urban Trading Company full-time in that same year. The couple converted the conservatory of their house at 2 Kings Villas, Chase Road, Southgate, then in Middlesex, into a studio optimised for stop motion for time-lapse, which he called 'speed magnification'. By the arrival of the First World War, Smith had directed over fifty nature films for the Urban Sciences series, including the pioneering time-lapse film The Birth of a Flower (1910), filmed in the Kinemacolor process for Urban's Natural Color Kinematograph Company.

With the outbreak of hostilities, Smith realised that he could use the same techniques to help viewers understand massed troop movements and engagements. He applied his stop-motion techniques to aerial depictions of battles, creating a series of fifteen Kineto War Maps. The first of these was released 22 October 1914. A typical example is Kineto War Map No. 5: Fight for the Dardanelles (15 April 1915). A contemporary reviewer wrote:

The achievement of the Kineto War Maps is to place before one in concentrated form the true significance of various intricate and extensive operations. In a few minutes, they make absolutely clear and comprehensible important facts which the average reader finds it difficult to grasp fully from the muddle of official communiques and unofficial comments. Better than any verbal explanations these animated diagrams assist one to gauge the exact value and meaning of involved military evolutions which are often so perplexing to the lay mind when dealt with in the ordinary manner. It may almost be said, indeed, that these Kineto maps are essential to a proper understanding of the War.

From 1916 to 1918 Smith served in the Royal Navy as photographer, subsequently transferring to the Royal Air Force Reserve until his discharge in 1920. He began a series of animated films for children under the title Bedtime Stories of Archie the Ant, of which three episodes (Bertie's Cave, The Pit and the Plum, and The Tale of a Tendril) were abandoned in an unfinished state in 1925. These films used 2D cut-outs to tell whimsical stories.

In 1922 producer Harry Bruce Woolfe recruited Smith for his British Instructional Films series Secrets of Nature. His first Secrets of Nature films came out in 1925. In this capacity he worked as photographer with directors such as Mary Field and H. R. Hewer. In 1933 Woolfe transferred the team to a new company, briefly known as British Independent Productions before it changed its name to Gaumont-British Instructional. At this point Secrets of Nature became Secrets of Life, but it retained its focus as a natural history series targeted to education.

Percy Smith died at his home (now Fairlawn Close) on 24 March 1945. His death was recorded as suicide by coal gas poisoning and was front-page news in the British tabloids. He left a will and an estate valued at £3203 2s 6d.

A BBC documentary charting the work of Smith and attempting to recreate his The Acrobatic Fly was screened in 2013.

== Availability ==
In 2010 the British Film Institute (BFI) compiled 19 short films on DVD and Blu-ray as Secrets of Nature: Pioneering Natural History Films. This includes ten of Smith's films: The Plants of the Pantry (1927), Floral Co-operative Societies (1927), Peas and Cues (1930), Scarlet Runner & Co (1930), The Strangler (1930), Gathering Moss (1933), Magic Myxies (1931), The World in a Wine-glass (1931), Romance in a Pond (1932), and Brewster's Magic (1933). Also included is a 3-minute cinemagazine item, Percy Smith with Herons (1921).

In 2016 Minute Bodies: The Intimate World of F. Percy Smith was released by the BFI in a combination DVD and Blu-ray set. Directed by Stuart A. Staples, this "meditative, immersive film" combines portions of several films. It is presented with an original soundtrack by Tindersticks with Thomas Belhom and Christine Ott. Also on the disk are eight Smith originals: The Birth of a Flower (1910), The Strength and Agility of Insects (1911), The Wonders of Harmonic Designing (1913), Plants of the Underworld (1930), Nature's Double Lifers - Ferns and Fronds (1932), He Would A-Wooing Go (1936), Lupins (1936), and The Life Cycle of the Newt (1942).

== Filmography ==
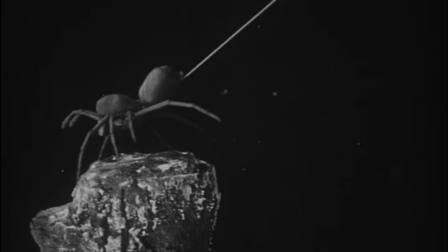
To Demonstrate How Spiders Fly

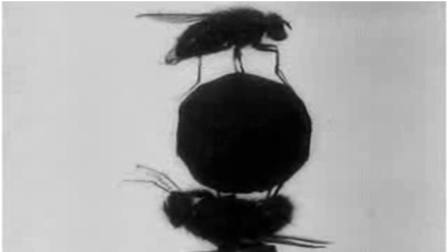
The Acrobatic Fly

Though the exact number is difficult to determine, Smith directed or photographed over one hundred films. On many titles he was not directly credited. The following titles have been compiled from trusted sources such as BFI websites, liner notes for the DVD releases, and the other references listed below. Additional films are listed on sites such as IMDb, but will not be included until they can be corroborated. All films were directed by Smith himself, unless otherwise noted.

Organisation is by type of film and production company, which retains chronology for the most part.

Kineto trick films

- Chemical Portraiture (June 1909)
- Dissolving the Government (June 1909)
- Bewildering Transformations (April 1912)
- Bewildering Transformations (December 1914)

cut-out animation (unfinished)

- The Bedtime Stories of Archie the Ant: Bertie's Cave (1925)
- The Bedtime Stories of Archie the Ant: The Pit and the Plum (1925)
- The Bedtime Stories of Archie the Ant: The Tale of a Tendril (1925)

Charles Urban Trading Company (mostly Kineto)

- The Balancing Bluebottle (1908) Urban-Eclipse
- To Demonstrate How Spiders Fly (1909)
- The Acrobatic Fly (1910)
- "The Birth of a Flower". BFI Screenonline. 1910. Archived from the original on 7 September 2009.
- Wonders of the Geomatograph (1910)
- "The Strength and Agility of Insects (1911)". BFI Screenonline. Archived from the original on 7 September 2009.
- The Fly Danger (1911)
- British Birds of Prey (1911)
- Varieties of Sweet Peas (1911)
- The Ways of the Wood Ant (1911)
- Tiny Honey Gatherers (1911)
- The Wonders of Harmonic Designing (1913)

Kineto War Maps

- Kineto War Map No. 1 (22 October 1914)
- Kineto War Map No. 2 (3 December 1914)
- Kineto War Map No. 3 How the Canadians Saved the Day at Ypres (4 February 1915)
- Kineto War Map No. 4 (11 March 1915)
- Kineto War Map No. 5 The Fight for the Dardanelles (15 April 1915)
- Kineto War Map No. 6 (1 July 1915)
- Kineto War Map No. 7 (30 August 1915)
- Kineto War Map No. 8 (11 October 1915)
- Kineto War Map No. 9 (29 November 1915)
- Kineto War Map No. 10 (27 January 1916)
- Kineto War Map No. 11 (23 March 1916)
- Kineto War Map No. 12 (27 April 1916)
- Kineto War Map No. 13 (18 May 1916)
- Kineto War Map No. 14 (10 August 1916)
- Kineto War Map No. 15 The Russia-Rumanian Advance (7 September 1916)

British Instructional Films: Secrets of Nature

- Spiders and Their Victims (1922) dir. Percy Smith, Charles Head
- Insect Artisans (1923) dir. Percy Smith, Mary Field
- The Battle of the Plants (1926)
- An Aquarium in a Wineglass (1926)
- Seed Time (1926)
- The Phantom (1926)
- The Life of a Plant (1926)
- The Gnat (1926)
- The Battle of the Pantry (1927)
- Floral Co-operative Societies (1927) dir. Mary Field
- The Story of a Leaf (1927) dir. Mary Field
- The Story of a Glass of Water (1927) dir. Mary Field
- The Story of the Grasses (1927) dir. Mary Field
- The Romance of the Flowers (1927) dir. Mary Field
- Plant Magic (1927) dir. Mary Field
- The Iris Family (1929)
- The Home Wrecker (1929)
- The Frog (1929)
- Life in the Balance (1929)
- Sirex Wood Wasps and Their Insect Enemies (1930) dir. R. Neil Chrystal
- Down Under (1930)
- Mitey Atoms (1930)
- The Strangler (1930)
- Scarlet Runner & Co (17 April 1929)
- Peas and Cues (11 July 1930)
- Plants of the Underworld (1930)
- Magic Myxies (1931) dir. Mary Field
- Waterfolk (1931) dir. Mary Field
- In all His Glory (1931) dir. Mary Field
- The World in a Wine-Glass (1931) dir. Mary Field
- Nature's Double Lifers - Ferns and Fronds (1932) dir. Mary Field
- Romance in a Pond (1932) dir. Mary Field
- Gathering Moss (1933) dir. Mary Field (editing and commentary)
- Brewster's Magic (1933) dir. Mary Field (editing and commentary)

Gaumont-British Instructional: Secrets of Life

- The Amoeba (1934)
- The Life Cycle of a Plant (1934)
- White Flies and Tomatoes (1934)
- Roots (1934) dir. Mary Field
- The Cabbage (1934)
- How Plants Feed (1934) dir. Mary Field
- The Filter (1934) dir. Mary Field
- The Thistle (1934)
- Life in the Balance (1935) dir. Mary Field
- Lupins (1936) dir. Mary Field
- Seed Production (1936)
- The Frog Life History (1936) dir. H.R. Hewer
- Hydra (1936) dir. H.R. Hewer
- Thistledown (1936)
- Queer Diet (1936)
- The Interdependence of Pond Life (1936)
- Self-defence by Plants (1936)
- He Would A-Wooing Go (1936)
- The Catch of the Season (1937) dir. Mary Field, commentator E.V.H. Emmett
- The Development of the Tadpole (1937) dir. J.V. Durden
- The Life of a One-Celled Animal (Amoeba) (1937) dir. J.V. Durden
- Pollination (1937) prod. E.J. Salisbury
- The Development of the Chick (1937) dir. J.V. Durden
- Hydra (1938) dir. J.V. Durden
- Seed Dispersal by Exploding Fruits (1938) dir. J.V. Durden
- Safety First (1938) dir. Mary Field
- Seed Dispersal by Burial (1938)
- Crustacea (1940) dir. J.V. Durden
- Onychophora and Myriapoda (1940) dir. J.V. Durden, commentator Carleton Hobbs
- Wisdom of the Wild (1940) dir. Mary Field, commentator E.V.H. Emmett
- Overlooked (1942) dir. Mary Field
- Water (1942) dir. Mary Field
- U-boat in the Pond (1942) dir. Mary Field, commentator E.V.H. Emmett
- Singing while They Work (1942) dir. Mary Field, commentator E.V.H. Emmett
- There's Nothing New (1942) dir. Mary Field, commentator E.V.H. Emmett
- Memories (1944) dir. Mary Field, commentator E.V.H. Emmett
- The Pest (1945) dir. Mary Field??, commentator E.V.H. Emmett
- Fresh As a Daisy (1945) dir. Irene Wilson, commentator E.V.H. Emmett
- The Country Comes to Town (1947) dir. Thora James, commentator E.V.H. Emmett

Gaumont-British Instructional / British Council

- The Life Cycle of the Newt (1942) dir. Mary Field
- The Life Cycle of the Maize (1942) dir. Mary Field
- The Life Cycle of the Pin Mould (1943) dir. Mary Field
- The Life History of the Onion (1943) dir. Mary Field
- The Life History of a Moss (1946)

Shell Film Unit

- Malaria (1941) dir. Grahame Tharp
