= List of films released in IMAX =

Films released in IMAX

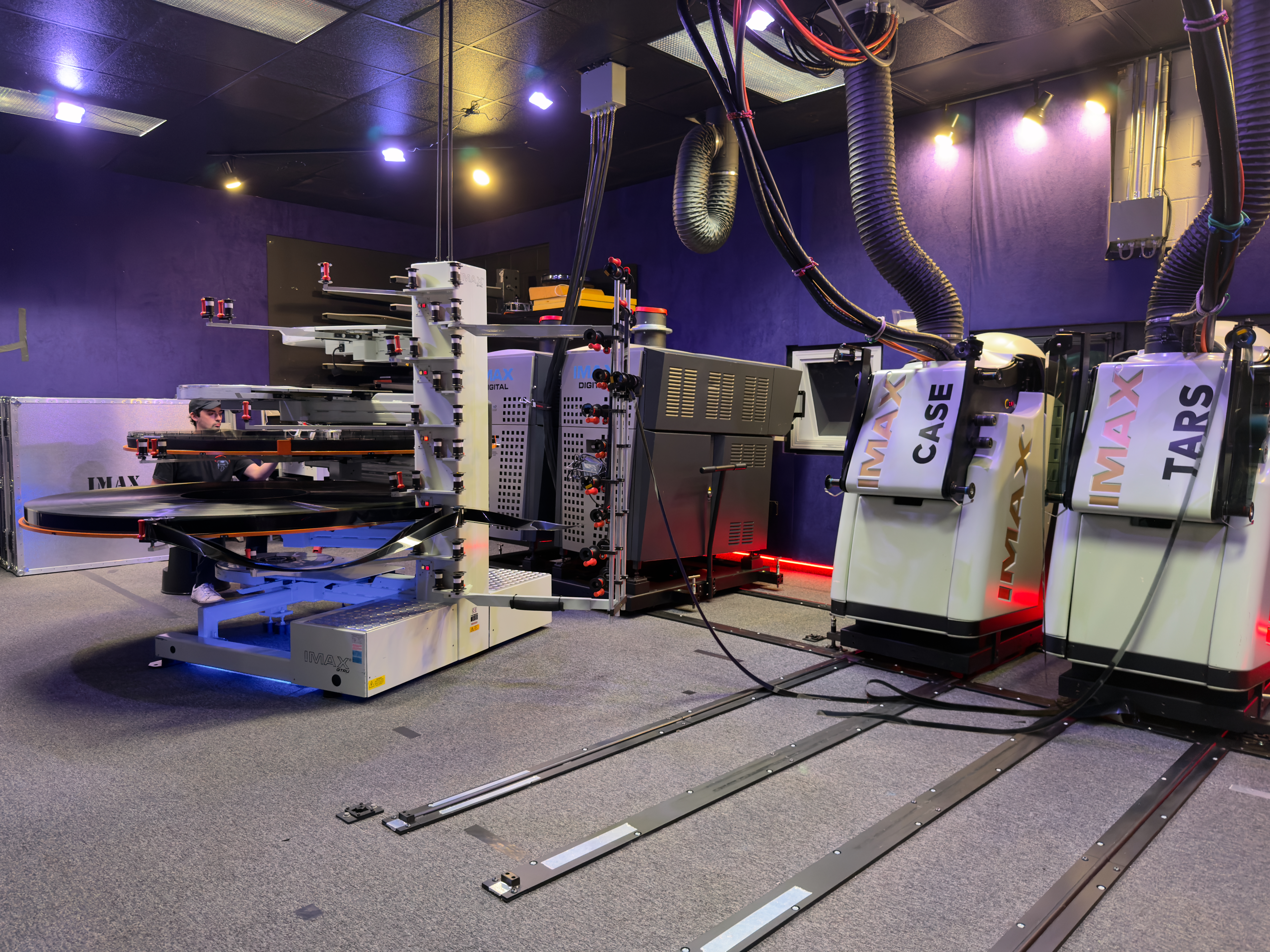
IMAX 70mm and digital projection systems

This is a list of films released in IMAX, a motion-picture film format and projection standard. IMAX cameras and film stock are rarely used for mainstream films; the cameras are heavy and the film stock is expensive. However, since 2002, some feature films shot with IMAX digital cameras or on original 35mm film stock have undergone IMAX Digital Media Remastering (DMR) processing for showing both in 70mm IMAX theaters and in IMAX Digital theaters.

Several animated titles (Fantasia 2000, Beauty and the Beast, Treasure Planet, The Lion King, Falling in Love Again, CyberWorld, Fly Me to the Moon 3D, and Santa vs. the Snowman 3D) were released in IMAX 70mm prints; however, they were not subject to DMR processing. Academy Award-winning cinematographer Roger Deakins supervised custom transfers for Skyfall, Blade Runner 2049, and 1917 rather than using IMAX's DMR process.

This list includes the films that have been released in IMAX theaters. Films that were presented in IMAX theaters using either 35mm or digital prints, but were never specifically mastered for IMAX, are not included.

As of August 11, 2026, The Odyssey (2026) is the highest-grossing IMAX release of all time, grossing over $289 million from IMAX screens. The previous record holder was Avatar (2009), which grossed over $271 million.

== 1990s ==
Name	Release date	Format			Notes
Name	Release date	70mm	Digital	Laser	Notes
Wings of Courage	21 April 1995	Yes	No	No	First narrative film shot in IMAX 65mm. 1.43:1 aspect ratio for IMAX 3D, OMNIMAX, and 8/70mm presentations.

== Cancelled releases ==
Name	Release date	Notes
Shrek	18 May 2001	In 2000, IMAX released CyberWorld onto its branded large-screen theaters. It was a compilation film that featured stereoscopic conversions of various animated shorts and sequences, including the bar sequence in Antz. DreamWorks was so impressed by the technology used for the sequence's "stereoscopic translation", that the studio and IMAX decided to plan a big-screen 3D version of Shrek. The film would have been re-released during the Christmas season of 2001, or the following summer, after its conventional 2D release. The re-release would have also included new sequences and an alternate ending. Plans for this was dropped due to "creative changes" instituted by DreamWorks and resulted in a loss of $1.18 million, down from IMAX's profit of $3.24 million.
Catwoman	23 July 2004	Catwoman was initially slated for a simultaneous IMAX release alongside its general theatrical debut, as promoted by marketing materials featuring the tagline "Catch Her in IMAX." However, on 30 June 2004, Warner Bros. announced the cancellation of the IMAX release due to delays in the film's visual effects, which prevented sufficient time for remastering the film for the IMAX format.
Pan	9 October 2015	Pan was originally planned for an IMAX 3D release, as evident in early posters, trailers, and press, but was cancelled and only received non-IMAX presentations.
King Arthur: Legend of the Sword	12 May 2017	It was originally planned for an IMAX 3D release on 24 March 2017, as evident in the Comic-Con trailer on 23 July 2016, but was cancelled due to it being postponed and only received non-IMAX presentations.
The Lego Ninjago Movie	22 September 2017	The Lego Ninjago Movie was originally planned for an IMAX release, as evident in trailers (attached to Pirates of the Caribbean: Dead Men Tell No Tales and Transformers: The Last Knight), and Facebook, but was cancelled and only received non-IMAX presentations and then eventually, Kingsman: The Golden Circle took over the IMAX screenings.
Artemis Fowl	12 June 2020	The film was originally scheduled for a theatrical and IMAX release on 9 August 2019, by Walt Disney Studios Motion Pictures. In May 2019, the film was pushed back to 29 May 2020. Later however, due to the impact of the COVID-19 pandemic on cinema, the film's theatrical release was cancelled and it was exclusively released on Disney+ on 12 June 2020.
Soul	25 December 2020	The official IMAX Instagram account posted the film's second trailer on their page with the description saying that it will release in IMAX on 12 June 2020 before Disney announced the cancellation of the film's theatrical release and it instead was released worldwide on Disney+ in response to the COVID-19 pandemic on 25 December 2020.
Luca	18 June 2021	Has "Optimized for IMAX Theatres" mentioned in the end credits. The film was originally set to be theatrically released in the United States on 18 June 2021 by Walt Disney Studios Motion Pictures. However, on 23 March 2021, Disney announced the cancellation of the film's theatrical release and it instead was released worldwide on Disney+ in response to the COVID-19 pandemic on the same date.
Malignant	10 September 2021	Has "Optimized for IMAX Theatres" mentioned in the end credits.
Halloween Kills	15 October 2021	Has "Optimized for IMAX Theatres" mentioned in the end credits. In 2020, John Carpenter and David Gordon Green stated that Universal planned to release the film in IMAX.
Turning Red	11 March 2022	Has "Optimized for IMAX Theatres" mentioned in the end credits. The film was originally set to be theatrically released in the United States on 11 March 2022 by Walt Disney Studios Motion Pictures. However, as the Omicron variant cases rose, on 7 January 2022, the decision was made to shift the film from its theatrical release to its direct-to-streaming release on Disney+ as a Disney+ original. In international markets where Disney+ was not available, it was released theatrically. The film was shown in SM Megamall's IMAX theater in Mandaluyong City, Philippines on April 6, 2022 under a regular format.
Sonic the Hedgehog 3	25 December 2024	The film was originally planned to receive an IMAX release in Mexico and other select territories in Latin America as evident from the presence of the IMAX logo in the original trailer and posters for the Latin American release, which were consequently dropped weeks before the film released.
The Cat in the Hat	6 November 2026	Originally planned release in IMAX during its initial February 27, 2026 release date, but it was canceled after it was delayed to November 6 due to commitments for Godzilla Minus Zero, The Hunger Games: Sunrise on the Reaping, and Ramayana: Part 1, all three of which were filmed for IMAX.

== Regular format releases ==
These films were shown in IMAX theaters (since IMAX Digital) in regular formats, as the technology plays non-IMAX formats.

Name	Release date	Notes
Battle For Greatness: Pacquiao vs. Mayweather	3 May 2015	Philippines only. One-day-only engagement. Live via satellite. It was only connected through pay-TV digiboxes like Cignal or Sky Cable.
Crazy Rich Asians	15 August 2018	Shown at the premiere screening at the TCL Chinese Theatre on 7 August 2018 and select theaters in Philippines for a limited time.
BTS: Permission to Dance on Stage - Seoul: Live Viewing	12 March 2022	Livestream event. One-night-only engagement. Shown only under test operations on SM Aura's IMAX theater (under Large Screen Format interim branding), Taguig City, Philippines, due to contract negotiations.
Seventeen Power of Love: The Movie	20 April 2022	Shown only under test operations on SM Aura's IMAX theater (under Large Screen Format interim branding), Taguig City, Philippines, due to contract negotiations.
