= List of films released in IMAX (2000s) =

Films released in IMAX in the 2000s

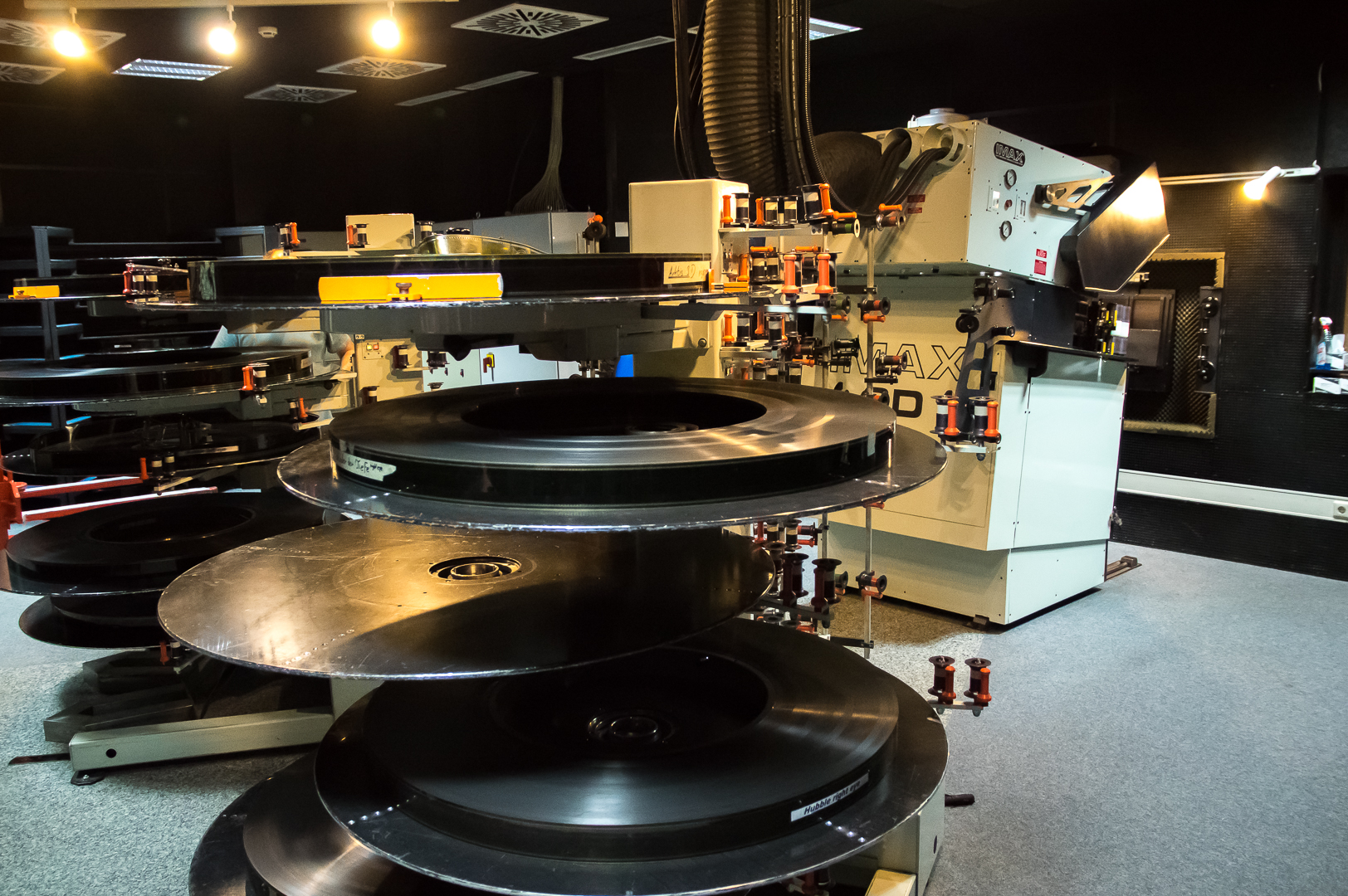
IMAX 70mm projection system

This is a list of films released in IMAX in the 2000s, a motion-picture film format and projection standard. IMAX cameras and film stock are rarely used for mainstream films; the cameras are heavy and the film stock is expensive. However, since 2002, some feature films shot with IMAX digital cameras or on original 35mm film stock have undergone IMAX Digital Media Remastering (DMR) processing for showing both in 70mm IMAX theaters and in IMAX Digital theaters.

Several animated titles (Fantasia 2000, Beauty and the Beast, Treasure Planet, The Lion King, Falling in Love Again, CyberWorld, Fly Me to the Moon 3D, and Santa vs. the Snowman 3D) were released in IMAX 70mm prints; however, they were not subject to DMR processing. Academy Award-winning cinematographer Roger Deakins supervised custom transfers for Skyfall, Blade Runner 2049, and 1917 rather than using IMAX's DMR process.

This list includes the films that have been released in IMAX theaters. Films that were presented in IMAX theaters using either 35mm or digital prints, but were never specifically mastered for IMAX, are not included.

As of August 11, 2026, Avatar (2009) is the highest-grossing IMAX release of the 2000s, which grossed over $271 million.

== 2000 ==
Name	Release date	Format			Notes
Name	Release date	70mm	Digital	Laser	Notes
Fantasia 2000	1 January 2000	Yes	No	No	
CyberWorld	6 October 2000	Yes	No	No	

== 2002 ==
Name	Release date	Format			Notes
Name	Release date	70mm	Digital	Laser	Notes
Beauty and the Beast (1991)	1 January 2002	Yes	No	No	Originally released in 1991.
Apollo 13	20 September 2002	Yes	No	No	The first IMAX DMR film. Originally released in 1995. The 2002 re-release is 25 minutes shorter than the 35mm version due to older IMAX equipment having platter size limits, with these scenes remastered for the 2025 re-release for its 30th anniversary. Aspect ratio opened up to 1.66:1 for the 2002 re-release.
Santa vs. the Snowman 3D	1 November 2002	Yes	No	No	
Star Wars: Episode II – Attack of the Clones	1 November 2002	Yes	No	No	Originally released in May 2002. 20 minutes shorter than the 35mm version due to older IMAX equipment having platter size limits. Aspect ratio cropped to 1.85:1. Closing credits changed to slide format due to platter size limits.
Treasure Planet	27 November 2002	Yes	No	No	The first feature-length film to be released simultaneously in standard and IMAX theaters.
The Lion King (1994)	25 December 2002	Yes	No	No	Originally released in 1994.

== 2003 ==
Name	Release date	Format			Notes
Name	Release date	70mm	Digital	Laser	Notes
The Matrix Reloaded	6 June 2003	Yes	No	No	
The Matrix Revolutions	5 November 2003	Yes	No	No	First IMAX DMR day-and-date film. First IMAX DMR worldwide release.
Falling in Love Again	31 December 2003				

== 2004 ==
Name	Release date	Format			Notes
Name	Release date	70mm	Digital	Laser	Notes
Harry Potter and the Prisoner of Azkaban	4 June 2004	Yes	No	No	
Spider-Man 2	30 June 2004	Yes	No	No	Preserved on home media for IMAX Enhanced on Sony Pictures Core.
The Polar Express	10 November 2004	Yes	No	No	First IMAX 3D DMR film. Aspect ratio cropped to 2.00:1 for the entire film.

== 2005 ==
Name	Release date	Format			Notes
Name	Release date	70mm	Digital	Laser	Notes
Robots	11 March 2005	Yes	No	No	
Batman Begins	15 June 2005	Yes	No	No	Screened without end credits in select theaters with older IMAX equipment which had platter size limits.
Charlie and the Chocolate Factory	15 July 2005	Yes	No	No	
Harry Potter and the Goblet of Fire	18 November 2005	Yes	No	No	

== 2006 ==
Name	Release date	Format			Notes
Name	Release date	70mm	Digital	Laser	Notes
V for Vendetta	17 March 2006	Yes	No	No	
Poseidon	12 May 2006	Yes	No	No	
Superman Returns	28 June 2006	Yes	No	No	20 minutes converted to 3D. End-credits sped up to fit the film to the IMAX platters.
The Ant Bully	28 July 2006	Yes	No	No	In 3D. Aspect ratio cropped to 1.43:1 for IMAX 70mm prints.
Open Season	29 September 2006	Yes	No	No	In 3D.
Happy Feet	17 November 2006	Yes	No	No	Aspect ratio cropped to 1.43:1 for IMAX 70mm prints.
Night at the Museum	22 December 2006	Yes	No	No	

== 2007 ==
Name	Release date	Format			Notes
Name	Release date	70mm	Digital	Laser	Notes
300	9 March 2007	Yes	No	No	
Spider-Man 3	4 May 2007	Yes	No	No	Preserved on home media for IMAX Enhanced on Sony Pictures Core.
Harry Potter and the Order of the Phoenix	11 July 2007	Yes	No	No	20-minute finale converted to 3D.
Transformers	21 September 2007	Yes	No	No	Re-release with extended scenes.
Beowulf	16 November 2007	Yes	No	No	In 3D.
I Am Legend	14 December 2007	Yes	No	No	Preceded by 6-minute preview of The Dark Knight.

== 2008 ==
Name	Release date	Format			Notes
Name	Release date	70mm	Digital	Laser	Notes
U2 3D	23 January 2008	Yes	No	No	In 3D.
The Spiderwick Chronicles	14 February 2008	Yes	No	No	
Shine a Light	4 April 2008	Yes	No	No	
Speed Racer	9 May 2008	Yes	Yes	No	First American release in IMAX Digital. Re-release in IMAX theatres on April 20, 2026.
Kung Fu Panda	6 June 2008	Yes	Yes	No	Aspect ratio cropped to 1.43:1 for IMAX 70mm prints.
The Dark Knight	18 July 2008	Yes	Yes	No	First feature to be partially shot with IMAX 65mm cameras, with 28 minutes of footage in an expanded 1.43:1 aspect ratio for IMAX GT Venues. First DMR film to surpass 150 minutes. Home-Media (excl. Streaming & DVD) retained the expanded AR in cropped 1.78:1 (16:9) for IMAX scenes. Re-released 24 August 2018.
Fly Me to the Moon	15 August 2008	Yes	No	No	
Eagle Eye	26 September 2008	Yes	Yes	No	
Madagascar: Escape 2 Africa	7 November 2008	Yes	Yes	No	Aspect ratio cropped to 1.43:1 for IMAX 70mm prints.
The Day the Earth Stood Still	12 December 2008	Yes	Yes	No	

== 2009 ==
Name	Release date	Format			Notes
Name	Release date	70mm	Digital	Laser	Notes
Jonas Brothers: The 3D Concert Experience	27 February 2009	No	Yes	No	In 3D. Filmed with the Fusion Camera System. First IMAX Digital Exclusive.
Watchmen	6 March 2009	Yes	Yes	No	Closing credits changed to slide format, and one closing credits song was omitted to reduce running time.
Monsters vs. Aliens	27 March 2009	Yes	Yes	No	In 3D.
Star Trek	8 May 2009	Yes	Yes	No	Limited engagement.
Night at the Museum: Battle of the Smithsonian	22 May 2009	Yes	Yes	No	
Transformers: Revenge of the Fallen	24 June 2009	Yes	Yes	Yes	10 minutes shot with IMAX 65mm cameras, presented in an expanded 1.43:1 aspect ratio. Preserved on home media in a cropped 1.78:1 (16:9) aspect ratio for the Walmart "Big Screen Edition". About half-a-minute of footage exclusive to the IMAX version.
Harry Potter and the Half-Blood Prince	15 July 2009	Yes	Yes	No	10-minute opening converted to 3D.
Cloudy with a Chance of Meatballs	18 September 2009	Yes	Yes	No	In 3D.
Where the Wild Things Are	16 October 2009	No	Yes	No	Limited engagement.
Michael Jackson's This Is It	28 October 2009	No	Yes	No	Limited engagement.
Disney's A Christmas Carol	6 November 2009	Yes	Yes	No	In 3D.
James Cameron's Avatar	18 December 2009	Yes	Yes	Yes	In 3D. Exclusive 1.78:1 aspect ratio (windowboxed; standard 3D retains 1.78:1 AR without windowboxing). Filmed with the Fusion Camera System. Screened with no end credits in some theaters with older IMAX equipment which had platter size limits. Re-released 23 September 2022 in 4K HDR, with select scenes in HFR (48fps).
