= Tiger Child =

- Modern promotional image that depicts the Fuji Group Pavilion
- Directed by: Donald Brittain
- Written by: Donald Brittain
- Produced by: Roman Kroitor; Kiichi Ichikawa; Hiroshi Kawazoe
- Cinematography: Georges Dufaux; Guy Dufaux
- Edited by: Roman Kroitor
- Music by: Toshirō Mayuzumi
- Production companies: Multiscreen Corporation; Asuka Productions
- Distributed by: Fuyo Group
- Release date: March 15, 1970
- Running time: 17 minutes
- Countries: Japan; Canada
- Budget: CA$1,000,000

Tiger Child (Japanese: 虎の仔, Tora no ko) is a 1970 Canadian-Japanese experimental short film directed by Donald Brittain, and produced by Roman Kroitor, Kiichi Ichikawa, and Hiroshi Kawazoe.

It was the first film produced by the Multiscreen Corporation, today known as the IMAX Corporation; it premiered at Expo '70 in Osaka, Japan at the Fuji Group Pavilion. The film was displayed together with another visual arts project, Mandala.

Tiger Child was the first movie to utilize the "rolling loop" projection system, which had originally been designed for use in a medical setting; the 15/70 film format & the IMAX camera were also invented specifically for Tiger Child.

== Composition ==
Tiger Child has a non-linear narrative; the film was designed to run continuously, allowing the audience to enter the theater at any time. The film ran in tandem with the slideshow Mandala, which projected a series of photographs onto the interior surfaces of the theater. According to its designers, the theater itself was the largest inflatable building of its time.

Allison Whitney, PhD wrote that "architecture [was] a key factor in the viewer's experience" of Tiger Child, as it had been with its predecessor Labyrinth. Whitney opined that after Expo 67, Labyrinth can never be fully experienced again, because its custom theater and sound system no longer exist.

According to Seth Feldman, PhD, Tiger Child presently exists as two films. The first, which he calls the "originally perceived mode", is the film as it was originally presented in Osaka in 1970; Feldman believes that this version "can only be approximated through technical descriptions and anecdotal evidence". The second, which he calls the "linear mode", is the film as it has been presented in modern theaters. Feldman writes that while the film's "...screening in its original venue can only be imagined today – and its near infinite number of possible permutations is decidedly less accessible – it is possible to look at the film itself in the linear mode..."

The film's linear mode begins with an establishing shot of a wheat field, depicted with nine nearly-identical scenes arranged in a grid. Another scene early in the film is a composite arrangement depicting a couple having sex in a field, while Gordon Lightfoot is at the center of the image, singing his 1967 song "Softly".

Feldman says that when the film is viewed in linear mode, "a coherent structure is readily discernible". Feldman identifies six segments with different themes:

1. Conception, pregnancy, children at play (a couple making love in a field, a pregnant woman, happy couples, Asian children painting, choir boys, African and Asian children, European children watching a puppet show)
2. Adults at play (men flying giant kites, racing sculls, African dancers, a ski race, polka dancers, adults at an amusement park)
3. The end of innocence (alienated people, busy city streets, shooting victims, a facial contortionist, a young man being chased by police intercut with shots from a slaughterhouse)
4. Stabs at redemption (Buddhist monks, people helping thalidomide children)
5. The scope of human work and experience (congested & polluted urban landscapes, Africans living traditional lifestyles, cowboys herding cattle, a stunt driver flipping a car)
6. Descent into the modern wasteland (a taxidermist, a cobra, a stripper, the Berlin Wall, sick children in an African hospital, a Ku Klux Klan rally, violent demonstrations, a blind man amid the riot's wreckage)

However, Feldman notes that this is merely a simplified description, and "is far from inclusive or definitive", as it does not account for the intricate transitions between each segment.

According to producer Kroitor, the phrase "tiger child" originally referred to a particular scene displaying a young thalidomide victim being lifted into a swimming pool; the production team named this scene the "Tiger Child Shot". This scene was one of the few full-screen shots in the film. Whitney described the scene like this:

The first minutes of the film show multiple images of children playing and mugging for the camera. We then cut to a full-screen image of a little boy sitting beside a swimming pool, wearing a towel over his shoulders. The viewer is taken aback by the sudden presentation of a large, unified image, one that seems comparatively serene, without the inter-image kineticism of the preceding sequence. This sense of wonder and beauty, in part stimulated by the child's sweet appearance, turns to shock when his towel is removed to reveal that he has no arms, apparently the result of a Thalidomide-induced birth defect. What follows is a sequence devoted to images of Thalidomide babies, many of them struggling to use prosthetic limbs and other devices.

== Production ==
In preparation for Expo '70, Japanese organizations sent research teams to Expo 67 to study the most popular pavilions. After the success of multi-screen films at the expo, these organizations aimed to replicate the phenomenon at the upcoming Expo '70. Among them was the Fuyo Group (also called the "Fuji Group"), led by Japan's then-largest bank, the Fuji Bank.

The teams behind two Expo 67 multi-screen films, Labyrinth and Polar Life, banded together to form the Multiscreen Corporation. The Fuji Group became interested in Multiscreen, and planned to tour the film company's studio. However, Multiscreen deceived Fuji's delegates; instead, they were taken to three fake studios in Montreal & New York. First, they visited a two-room office in New York rented by Multiscreen co-founder Graeme Ferguson, which was filled with busy workers. However, in reality the workers were actors pretending to look busy. In Montreal, they visited what appeared to be a well-furnished office, but it was really a workroom filled with furniture that had recently been rented by another Multiscreen co-founder, Roman Kroitor. Finally, they visited the production studios of the National Film Board of Canada (where Kroitor had worked for years); but the delegates were not informed that the facility belonged to the NFB instead of Multiscreen.

The deception was successful. According to filmmaker Stephen Low, "Somehow the Japanese were mightily impressed with the whole experience. It must have seemed to them a large and very successful endeavour, and the question of who owned what was successfully fuzzy." After this, Multiscreen began collaborating on a new film with the Fuji Group.

The film was funded by the Fuji Group, the Canadian federal government, and the Ontario provincial government. In all, the film cost approximately $1,000,000 CAD to produce.

=== Personnel ===
Donald Brittain was the writer & director. Georges Dufaux was the chief cinematographer, and his brother Guy Dufaux was the secondary cinematographer. Georges Dufaux also contributed to Multiscreen's camera design proposals.

Roman Kroitor was a producer, Edward T. Haley was the sound director, and Toshirō Mayuzumi composed the score.

The executive producer of the Fuji Group Pavilion was Hiroshi Kawazoe, who was the owner of the Chianti restaurant, an elite hangout in Tokyo; he was also the owner of Asuka Productions, the Japanese company that co-produced the film with Multiscreen. At the time, Kawazoe was also co-producing the Japanese version of the stage production Hair. His son Shoro Kawazoe was another co-producer on Hair.

Kiichi Ichikawa was the producer in charge of Tiger Child's Japanese production team. He had been the producer of the 1964 film Woman in the Dunes, a film that Kawazoe was involved in promoting. Ichikawa became the pavilion's executive producer after Kawazoe's death.

Teiji Ito was the original director of Mandala. He was a friend of Multiscreen co-founder Graeme Ferguson. Ito's duties were later transferred to Colin Low, a filmmaker from the National Film Board of Canada. Low was credited as the "Presentations Consultant" for Tiger Child.

Yutaka Murata was the pavilion's architect. Murata had previously collaborated with Kawazoe; he was Chianti's interior designer. Kawaguchi & Engineers was the pavilion's engineering firm.

=== Filming ===
Principal photography was divided into two phases. The first began in December 1968 and finished in January 1969, shooting on location in Montreal, New York, Calgary, and Kenya. After this phase was complete, the dailies were reviewed for six weeks; shooting then resumed in March 1969 at London, Berlin, Israel, Bangkok, and Japan.

The IMAX camera suffered from frequent technical difficulties, and only 10 to 20 shots filmed with the device were used in the final cut. The other two cameras used for filming were a customized 65mm vertical camera, and an Arriflex 35.

=== IMAX projector ===
In 1965, the National Heart Foundation of Australia funded a film project started by Jim Hood, a cardiologist at the Brisbane Chest Hospital. Hood had created his own high-speed cinefluoroscope (an x-ray film camera), but he needed a special projector that was capable of playing these films. Hood consulted his friend Ron Jones for help with this project.

Jones invented the rolling loop mechanism while driving home one night in 1966; afraid of forgetting his new idea, he decided to forgo sleep that night and designed a rough prototype, which took him 19 hours to create. In September 1967, Hood and Jones' findings were presented at an SMPTE conference, and were later published in the Journal of the SMPTE.

Multiscreen was introduced to the rolling loop mechanism when cinematographer Jean-Philippe Carson brought one of the Journal of the SMPTE articles to their attention. After learning that Jones still possessed the patent, Carson and Multiscreen co-founder Robert Kerr flew to Brisbane and purchased it from him. Jones then worked as a consultant for Multiscreen, helping Multiscreen's engineer Bill Shaw with issues related to the rolling loop.

Multiscreen's rolling loop projector was created at a university laboratory in Hamilton, Ontario by Bill Shaw and a Vietnamese graduate student. Specifically, it was the physics laboratory at McMaster University. The lens used on the projector was developed by Canon, a member of the Fuyo Group. This was the projector used to show the film at Expo '70.

=== IMAX camera ===
Once the projector's specifications had been decided, Multiscreen began searching for an engineer to design their camera.

In June 1968, Ferguson and Shaw went to Los Angeles to consult with Film Effects of Hollywood, Linwood G. Dunn's company. Film Effects had developed Dynavision, a system which used a 65mm 8-perf camera. Although the camera shot vertically, this format had virtually the same aspect ratio as 70mm 15-perf, which would have allowed the frames to be upscaled and rotated with a custom optical printer. However, the Dynavision camera was deemed too heavy for use by Multiscreen; ultimately, they had to search for another designer.

Ferguson asked the New York cinematographer Robert Gaffney for help locating a designer. Gaffney suggested Jan Jacobsen, a Norwegian engineer. Gaffney had used one of Jacobsen's 65mm 5-perf cameras, and suspected that it could be modified into an 8-perf camera. Ferguson flew to Munich to discuss the proposal with Jacobsen, but Jacobsen dissuaded him from pursuing 8-perf. Instead, he offered to build a 65mm 15-perf camera, which would save Multiscreen the effort of having to use an optical printer. Ferguson accepted the proposal.

Jacobsen soon began working on the camera at his friend's machine shop in Copenhagen. The camera took 4 months to build; it was operational by November 8, 1968. The camera captured its first image the next day, which was a portrait of Ferguson. Jacobsen delivered the finished camera to Multiscreen on December 3, 1968.

Chief cinematographer Dufaux received the camera a few weeks before filming commenced; it had a 500-foot magazine and operated at a speed of 340 feet per minute. Its power source was a car battery.

=== Incidents during production ===
While filming in Kenya, the crew was detained by the authorities, who had accused them of filming local poverty. The authorities coerced the filmmakers into censoring the footage.

According to Brittain's biographer Brian Nolan, a Japanese camera company had taken sole credit for Multiscreen's technical achievements. Multiscreen's editors went on strike, and Kroitor hired a local lawyer to threaten the camera company with a lawsuit. In response, Kawazoe threatened that he would get Multiscreen's employees deported from Japan. Brittain considered the whole affair "very nasty".

Executive producer Kawazoe suddenly died of cancer in January 1970, which halted production. Not long after, the members of the Hair production team brought marijuana to his antiques store, which was the place where Tiger Child was being edited. This culminated in a police raid that was publicized in the local newspapers. Shoro Kawazoe and other Hair cast members were arrested.

One of the photographers that contributed to Mandala disagreed with the production's proposed usage of his photographs, and demanded for Mandala director Ito to return them. Ito refused, which led the disgruntled photographer to hire samurai reenactors tasked with harassing the crew and retrieving the photographs. Brittain and Ichikawa began to grow dissatisfied with the Mandala team, and attempted to replace Ito with Colin Low, one of Multiscreen's frequent collaborators. However, the slides team responded by locking the Mandala photographs away. Brittain retaliated by breaking the lock and stealing the photos, which he later handed over to Low; after this, Low took over Ito's role. According to Ferguson, Brittain and Kroitor had been unhappy that they were forced to collaborate with Ito.

== Reception ==
William Szabo of Industrial Photography magazine named Tiger Child his favorite audio-visual show at Expo '70, noting that "after the Fuji experience, it becomes a little more difficult to make a second choice". Szabo opined that the film was created by "artists who have great understanding and compassion", and the show was presented with a "superb technical excellence". He also reacted favorably to the auditory experience, as well as the Mandala slideshow, saying: "the film, slides, and sound create a total experience quite unlike anything ever done before".

Herb Lightman of the American Cinematographer journal named Tiger Child and the Midori-Kai Astrorama's Birth to be the two best films at Expo '70. Lightman said that the film "contrasts images of indescribable beauty with those of brutal realism" and was a "technologically ingenious achievement". He noted that the film contained "some strong stuff", and considered the film to be one of the few at Expo '70 to present "a theme of forceful social significance", contrasting it with the lighthearted Expo films of the era. Lightman concluded that Tiger Child had the potential to become the "hit of the show" at Expo '70, much like its predecessor Labyrinth was at Expo 67.

Rudy Bretz, a RAND Corporation consultant, considered Tiger Child the "most impressive" of the "many excellent films" he viewed at Expo '70. He considered the film "such a moving experience" that he stayed on the turntable to view the film an additional three times; he then returned another day for more viewings. Bretz felt that the scene with the armless thalidomide child and the wastelands imparted strong feelings upon the viewer, noting that "the artistry of Tiger Child ... [lays] in conveying the desired feeling without words". He opined that this required "a high level of artistic skill" to achieve, and would be difficult to accomplish in single-screen films. However, Bretz reacted negatively to the Mandala slideshow, which he considered a distraction from the film.

== Availability ==
As of 2014, IMAX had no plans to digitize the film for commercial release.

In 2002, IMAX executive David Keighley used the internegatives of Tiger Child to create a release print. This print was screened at the 2012 Giant Screen Cinema Association International Conference in Sacramento, California. As of September 2012, this was the only copy in circulation.

As of 2017, Tiger Child's negatives are stored in a climate-controlled room at IMAX's Los Angeles headquarters.
