= Roman Kroitor =

Canadian filmmaker (1926–2012)

- Born: December 12, 1926; Yorkton, Saskatchewan, Canada
- Died: September 17, 2012 (aged 85); Montreal
- Occupations: Film director Film producer Screenwriter; Inventor
- Years active: 1949 - 2012

Roman Kroitor (December 12, 1926 – September 17, 2012) was a Canadian filmmaker who was known as a pioneer of Cinéma vérité, as the co-founder of IMAX, and as the creator of the Sandde hand-drawn stereoscopic 3D animation system. He was also the original inspiration for The Force. His prodigious output garnered numerous awards, including two BAFTA Awards, three Cannes Film Festival awards, and two Oscar nominations.

== Early life ==
Roman Boghdan Kroitor was born in Yorkton, Saskatchewan, to Ukrainian immigrants Peter and Tatiana (Shewchuk), both of whom were teachers. Peter died when Roman was four; Tatiana moved the family to Winnipeg and continued teaching. Roman attended the University of Manitoba, graduating in 1951 with a Master of Arts in Philosophy.

== National Film Board of Canada ==
In 1949 and 1950, Kroitor attended the Summer Intern program at the National Film Board of Canada (NFB) in Ottawa. Upon graduation from university, he was hired full-time, working as a production assistant and later as a film editor. His first film, 1953's Rescue Party laid the foundation for his pioneering Cinéma vérité style, and he went on to produce influential films such as Lonely Boy, Glenn Gould: On the Record, Glenn Gould: Off the Record, and the concert film Stravinsky. By 1958, Kroitor was producing documentaries; by 1964, he was one of the producers leading the NFB into the production of fiction films.

== IMAX ==
After seeing the ground-breaking NFB documentary Universe (1960), Stanley Kubrick tried to recruit Kroitor and Colin Low to work on 2001: A Space Odyssey. They declined because, with Hugh O'Connor and Tom Daily, they were working on a large-scale multi-screen film. This was In the Labyrinth, which the NFB exhibited at Expo 67 in Montreal. The film caused a sensation and, in the same year Kroitor and his friend and colleague, the director Graeme Ferguson, left the NFB as employees, but physically stayed, founding Multi-Screen Corporation (later IMAX Corp.) in the NFB's Montreal studios (with two other friends, Robert Kerr and engineer Bill Shaw). The Multi-Screen process involved a purpose-built camera, and 70mm film projected horizontally rather than vertically, with each frame the size of a postcard.

In 1970, for Expo 70 in Osaka, Kroitor produced the first IMAX film, the 17-minute Tiger Child, directed by Donald Brittain. In 1973, he returned to the NFB as a producer in charge of the Drama department, but continued to make IMAX films until his retirement. In 1990, he co-directed the first IMAX feature film, Stones at the Max. He also produced the first IMAX stereoscopic (S3D) film, We Are Born of Stars (anaglyph, 1985), and co-produced the first full-color OMNIMAX (IMAX Dome) S3D film, Echoes of the Sun (alternate-eye, 1990).

== SANDDE ==
While working to create traditional (actuality) and early CG films in a stereoscopic format, Kroitor became frustrated with the lack of direct interaction between the desires of (right-brained) artists and the results on film, because everything had to pass through the (left-brained) mathematicians and programmers. He conceived of the SANDDE hardware and software system as a way to allow artists to directly draw, in full stereoscopic 3D, what they want the audience to see.

== George Lucas and The Force ==
Kroitor was credited by Star Wars creator George Lucas as being the origin of the concept of The Force, an important thematic element in the Star Wars films. As reported by The Globe and Mail, Lucas first heard about "the force" in a conversation between Kroitor and Warren Sturgis McCulloch, an artificial intelligence guru, in 21-87, a 1963 collage film made by the NFB's Arthur Lipsett. Disagreeing with McCulloch's assertion that humans are nothing more than highly complex machines, Kroitor argued: "Many people feel that in the contemplation of nature and in communication with other living things, they become aware of some kind of force, or something, behind this apparent mask which we see in front of us, and they call it God."

== Personal life and death ==
In 1955, Kroitor married Janet Ferguson (Graeme Ferguson's sister); they had five children and lived in Montreal. On September 17, 2012, he died at the age of 85.

== Filmography ==
National Film Board of Canada

- Age of the Beaver - documentary short, Colin Low 1952 - editor
- Rescue Party - documentary short 1953 - director
- Paul Tomkowinkz: Street-Railway Switchman - documentary short 1953 - co-writer with Stanley Jackson, co-editor and co-producer with Tom Daly, director
- Farm Calendar - documentary 1955 - writer, director
- To Serve the Mind - documentary short, Stanley Jackson 1955 - co-writer with Stanley Jackson
- Introducing Canada - documentary short, Tom Daly 1956 - co-editor with Tom Daly
- City of Gold - documentary short, Colin Low & Wolf Koenig 1957 - writer
- The Great Plains - documentary short 1957 - editor, director
- It's a Crime - animated film, Wolf Koenig 1957 - writer
- L'année à la ferme – documentary short 1957 – writer, director
- Blood and Fire - documentary, Terence Macartney-Filgate 1958 - co-producer with Wolf Koenig
- Country Threshing - documentary short, Wolf Koenig 1958 - co-producer with Wolf Koenig
- The Days Before Christmas - documentary short, Wolf Koenig, Stanley Jackson & Terence Macartney-Filgate 1958 - co-editor with René Laporte & Wolf Koenig, co-producer with Wolf Koenig
- A Foreign Language - documentary short, Stanley Jackson 1958 - co-producer with Wolf Koenig
- Memory of Summer - documentary short, Stanley Jackson 1958 - co-producer with Wolf Koenig
- Pilgrimage - documentary short, Terence Macartney-Filgate 1958 - co-producer with Wolf Koenig
- Police - documentary short, Terence Macartney-Filgate 1958 - co-producer with Wolf Koenig
- The Back-Breaking Leaf - documentary short, Terence Macartney-Filgate 1959 - co-producer with Wolf Koenig
- La Battaison - documentary short, Wolf Koenig 1959 - co-producer with Wolf Koenig
- The Canadians - documentary short, Tom Daly 1959 - executive producer
- Emergency Ward - documentary short, William Greaves 1959 - co-producer with Wolf Koenig
- End of the Line - documentary short, Terence Macartney-Filgate 1959 - co-producer with Wolf Koenig
- Glenn Gould - Off the Record - documentary short 1959 - co-director and co-producer with Wolf Koenig
- Glenn Gould - On the Record - documentary short 1959 - co-director and co-producer with Wolf Koenig
- The Cars in Your Life - documentary short Terence Macartney-Filgate 1960 - co-producer with Wolf Koenig
- I Was a Ninety-pound Weakling - documentary short, Wolf Koenig & Georges Dufaux 1960 - co-producer with Wolf Koenig
- Universe - documentary short 1960 - writer, co-director with Colin Low
- The Days of Whiskey Gap - documentary short, Colin Low 1961 - co-producer with Wolf Koenig
- Festival in Puerto Rico - documentary short 1961 - co-director and co-editor with Wolf Koenig, producer
- University - documentary, Stanley Jackson 1961 - co-producer with Wolf Koenig
- Lonely Boy - documentary short 1962 - producer, co-director with Wolf Koenig
- The Living Machine - documentary 1962 - co-producer with Tom Daly, director
- Toronto Jazz - documentary short, Don Owen 1963 - producer
- Above the Horizon - documentary short 1964 - co-director with Hugh O'Connor, co-producer with Hugh O'Connor & Tom Daly
- The Hutterites - documentary short, Colin Low 1964 - co-producer with Tom Daly
- Legault’s Place - documentary short, Suzanne Angel 1964 - co-producer with Tom Daly
- Nobody Waved Goodbye - feature, Don Owen 1964 - co-producer with Don Owen
- The Baymen, documentary short, Rex Tasker 1965 - co-producer with Peter Jones
- Two Men of Montreal - documentary, Suzanne Angel, Donald Brittain & Don Owen 1965 - co-producer with Donald Brittain, John Kemeny & Tom Daly
- Little White Crimes - short film, George Kaczender 1966 - co-producer with John Kemeny
- Stravinsky - documentary 1966 - producer, co-director with Wolf Koenig
- In the Labyrinth - short film 1967 - co-director with Colin Low, Hugh O'Connor, co-producer with Tom Daly
- Tiger Child - short film, IMAX, Donald Brittain 1970 – writer, co-producer with Ichi Ichikawa
- Circus World, 1974 – director, producer, co-editor with Jackie Newell
- Propaganda Message - animated short, Barrie Nelson 1971 - co-producer with Wolf Koenig
- Man the Hunter: Caribou - documentary short, Dennis Sawyer 1974 - executive producer
- Man the Hunter: Fishing - documentary short, Dennis Sawyer 1975 - executive producer
- Man the Hunter: Seal Hunting - documentary short, Dennis Sawyer 1975 - executive producer
- Bargain Basement - short film, John N. Smith 1976 - producer
- For Gentlemen Only - documentary short, Michael J.F. Scott 1976 - executive producer
- Listen Listen Listen - documentary, Barbara Greene 1976 - executive producer
- Schefferville 4th Arctic Winter Games - documentary short, Dennis Sawyer 1976 - co-producer with Dennis Sawyer
- Striker - short film, Robert Nichol 1976 - executive producer
- The World is Round - documentary, Ian McLaren 1976 - executive producer
- The Machine Age - short film, Gilles Carle 1977 - co-producer with Jacques Bobet
- Back Alley Blue - documentary short, Bill Reid 1977 - executive producer
- Bekevar Jubilee - documentary short, Albert Kish 1977 - executive producer
- Breakdown - short film, Peter Thurling 1977 - executive producer
- Flora: Scenes from a Leadership Convention - documentary, Peter Raymont 1977 - co-executive producer with Arthur Hammond
- Happiness Is Loving Your Teacher - short film, John N. Smith 1977 - executive producer
- Henry Ford's America - documentary, Donald Brittain 1977 - co- producer with Donald Brittain & Paul Wright
- Hold the Ketchup - documentary short, Albert Kish 1977 - executive producer
- I Wasn’t Scared - short film, Giles Walker 1977 - co-producer with Vladimir Valenta
- Nature’s Food Chain - documentary short, Bernard Devlin 1977 - executive producer
- One Man - feature, Robin Spry 1977 - co-producer with Michael J.F. Scott, James de B. Domville, Tom Daly & Vladimir Valenta
- Sail Away - documentary short, Bruce Mackay 1977 - executive producer
- Strangers at the Door - short film, John Howe 1977 - co-producer with John Howe & Maxine Samuels
- Oh Canada - animated short, Barrie Nelson 1978 - co-producer with Wolf Koenig, Robert Verrall & Dorothy Courtois
- Easter Eggs - documentary short, Yurij Luhovy 1978 - executive producer
- Margaret Laurence, First Lady of Manawaka - documentary, Robert Duncan 1978 - executive producer
- The Point - documentary, Robert Duncan 1978 - executive producer
- The Red Dress - documentary short, Michael J.F. Scott 1978 - co-executive producer with Dieter Nachtigall
- The Russels - short film, Susan Huycke, Kenneth McCready, Mort Ransen & Bill Reid 1978 - executive producer
- So Long to Run - short film, Charles Lapp 1978 - executive producer
- Teach Me to Dance - short film, Anne Wheeler 1978 - co-producer with Vladimir Valenta & John Howe
- Voice of the Fugitive - short film, René Bonnière 1978 - executive producer
- The War is Over - short film, René Bonnière 1978 - executive producer
- Bravery in the Field - short film, Giles Walker 1979 - executive producer, co-producer with Stefan Wodoslawsky
- Gopher Broke - short film, Peter Thurling 1979 - executive producer, co-producer with Stefan Wodoslawsky
- Love on Wheels - short film, Ben Low & Ian Rankin 1979 - executive producer
- Northern Composition - documentary short, Bruce Mackay & Gary Toole 1979 - executive producer
- Revolution's Orphans - documentary short, John N. Smith 1979 - co-producer with Rob Iveson
- Twice Upon a Time... (Il était deux fois) - short film, Giles Walker 1979 - co-producer with Stefan Wodoslawsky
- Why Men Rape - documentary, Douglas Jackson 1979 - executive producer
- Acting Class - documentary short, John N. Smith 1980 - executive producer
- Challenger: An Industrial Romance - Stephen Low 1980 - executive producer
- Coming Back Alive - documentary short, Wolf Koenig, Paul Cowan, Rosemarie Shapley & Bill Mason 1980 - co-producer with Wolf Koenig
- Maritimes Dig - documentary short, Dennis Sawyer 1980 - executive producer
- Prehistoric Artifacts, New Brunswick - documentary short, Dennis Sawyer 1980 - executive producer
- Nose and Tina - documentary short, Norma Bailey 1980 - executive producer
- This was the Beginning, Part 1: The Invertebrates - documentary short, Dennis Sawyer 1980 - executive producer
- This was the Beginning, Part 2: The Vertebrates - documentary short, Dennis Sawyer 1980 - executive producer
- Baxter Earns His Wings - short film, Don Arioli 1981 - executive producer
- First Winter - documentary short, John N. Smith 1981 - executive producer
- Arthritis: A Dialogue with Pain - documentary, Susan Huycke 1981 - co-executive producer with Robert Verrall
- Hail Columbia - IMAX documentary, Graeme Ferguson 1981 - co-producer with Graeme Ferguson
- Where the Buoys Are - documentary short, Wolf Koenig, Paul Cowan, Rosemarie Shapley, Bill Mason 1981 - co-producer with Wolf Koenig
- Laughter in My Soul - documentary short, Halya Kuchmij 1983 - co-executive producer with Robert Verrall
- Skyward - short film, IMAX, Stephen Low 1985 - co-producer with Susumu Sakane
- Starbreaker - short film, Bruce Mackay 1984 - co-editor with Bruce Mackay, producer, co-executive producer with Robert Verrall
- A Freedom to Move - documentary short, IMAX, Michel Brault 1985 - executive producer
- We Are Born of Stars - documentary short, IMAX 3D, Nelson Max 1985 - producer, writer
- Heart Land - documentary short, IMAX, Norma Bailey, Richard Condie, Aaron Kim Johnston, Derek Mazur, John Paskievich, Gail Singer & Brion Whitford 1987 - co-producer with Sally Dundas
- Echoes of the Sun - documentary short, IMAX 1990 - co-director with Nelson Max, co-writer with Nelson Max & Colin Low, co-producer with Fumio Sumi & Sally Dundas
- Flowers in the Sky, IMAX, 1990 - co-producer with Charles Konowal
- The Last Buffalo - documentary short, IMAX 3D, Stephen Low 1990 - co-producer with Sally Dundas
- Imagine - documentary short, IMAX 3D, John Weiley 1993 - co-producer with Hyok-Kyu Kwon
- Stones at the Max - concert film, IMAX, Julien Temple, David Douglas, Noel Archambault, Christine Strande 1994 - co-director
- Paint Misbehavin’ - animated short, IMAX 3D, Peter Stephenson 1996 - co-producer with Steve Hoban
- CyberWorld - animated film, IMAX 3D, Colin Davies & Elaine Despins 2000 - co-producer with Sally Dundas, Steve Hoban & Hugh Murray

== Awards ==
Paul Tomkowicz: Street-Railway Switchman (1953)

- International Short Film Festival Oberhausen, Oberhausen: First Prize, 1958
- Edinburgh International Film Festival, Edinburgh: Diploma of Merit, Cultural, 1958
- International Filmfestival Mannheim-Heidelberg, Mannheim: Special Commendation of The Jury, 1958

Blood and Fire (1958)

- Ohio State Radio and TV Awards, Columbus, Ohio: First Prize, 1960
- 11th Canadian Film Awards, Toronto: Award of Merit, TV Information, 1959

The Back-Breaking Leaf (1959)

- 1960 Cannes Film Festival, Cannes: Eurovision Grand Prize, Documentary Films, 1960
- American Film and Video Festival, New York: Blue Ribbon Award, Agriculture, Conservation and Natural Resources, 1961
- International Labour and Industrial Film Festival, Antwerp: Diploma of Merit, Films Dealing with the Problems of People at Work, 1963

The Cars in Your Life (1960)

- American Film and Video Festival, New York: Blue Ribbon, Citizen, Government & City Planning, 1963

Universe (1960)

- 14th British Academy Film Awards, London: BAFTA Award for Best Animated Film, 1961
- Yorkton Film Festival, Yorkton: Golden Sheaf Award, Best Film of the Festival, 1960
- Vancouver International Film Festival, Vancouver: First Prize, Documentary, 1960
- 13th Canadian Film Awards, Toronto: Genie Award for Film of the Year, 1961
- 13th Canadian Film Awards, Toronto: Genie Award for Best Theatrical Short, 1961
- Salerno Film Festival, Salerno: First Prize – Documentary, 1961
- American Film and Video Festival, New York: Blue Ribbon, Science and Mathematics, 1961
- Columbus International Film & Animation Festival, Columbus, Ohio: Chris Award, Information/Education, 1961
- Rapallo International Film Festival, Rapallo: Cup of the Minister of Tourism and Entertainment, 1961
- Mar del Plata International Film Festival, Mar del Plata: Grand Prize, 1962
- International Festival of Educational Films, Mar del Plata: Best Documentary, 1962
- La Plata International Children’s Festival, La Plata: Silver Oak Leaf, First Prize, Scientific Films, 1962
- International Educational Film Festival, Tehran: Golden Delfan, First Prize, Scientific Films, 1964
- Cannes Film Festival, Cannes: Jury Prize for Exceptional Animation Quality, 1960
- Cannes Film Festival, Cannes: Technical Mention of the Commission Supérieure Technique du Cinéma Français, 1960
- International Festival of Scientific and Technical Films, Belgrade: Diploma of Honour, 1960
- International Festival of Short Films, Philadelphia: Award for Exceptional Merit, 1961
- Stratford Film Festival, Stratford, Ontario: Special Commendation, 1960
- Cork International Film Festival, Cork: First Prize – Diploma of Merit, 1960
- Edinburgh International Film Festival, Edinburgh: Diploma of Merit, Science, 1960
- Vancouver International Film Festival, Vancouver: Diploma, Scientific Films, 1960
- Scientific Film Festival, Caracas: Award of Merit, 1963
- Scholastic Teacher Magazine Annual Film Awards, New York: Award of Merit, 1963
- Educational Film Library Association of America, New York: Nomination, 10 Best Films of the Decade List, 1968
- 33rd Academy Awards, Los Angeles: Nominee: Best Documentary Short Subject, 1961

The Days of Whiskey Gap (1961)

- 1961 Cannes Film Festival, Cannes: Grand Prize, Documentary, 1961
- Canadian Historical Association, Toronto: Certificate of Merit "for outstanding contribution to local history in Canada", 1962
- Vancouver International Film Festival, Vancouver: Honorable Mention, Sociology, 1962

Lonely Boy (1962)

- Festival dei Popoli, Florence, Italy: Gold Medal, 1960
- International Short Film Festival Oberhausen, Oberhausen: First Prize, Documentary, 1963
- 15th Canadian Film Awards, Montreal: Film of the Year, 1963
- 15th Canadian Film Awards, Montreal: Best Film, General Information, 1963
- Vancouver International Film Festival, Vancouver: First Prize, Documentary, 1962
- Ann Arbor Film Festival, Ann Arbor, Michigan: The Purchase Prize, 1963
- International Days of Short Films, Tours, France: Special Jury Prize, 1962
- Edinburgh International Film Festival, Edinburgh, Scotland: Honorable Mention, 1962
- 1962 Cannes Film Festival, Cannes: Honorable Mention, Documentary Works, 1962

The Living Machine (1962)

- Columbus International Film & Animation Festival, Columbus, Ohio: Chris Award, Public Information, 1963
- Villeurbanne Short Film Festival, Villeurbanne: Diploma of Honor, 1963

The Hutterites (1964)

- Montreal International Film Festival, Montreal: First Prize, Shorts, 1964
- Columbus International Film & Animation Festival, Columbus, Ohio: Chris Award, First Prize, Religion, 1964
- Yorkton Film Festival, Yorkton: Golden Sheaf Award, First Prize, Human Relations, 1964
- Melbourne Film Festival, Melbourne: Honorable Mention, 1964
- American Film and Video Festival, New York: Blue Ribbon, Doctrinal and Denominational Topics, 1965
- Landers Associates Awards, Los Angeles: Award of Merit
- Festival dei Popoli/International Film Festival on Social Documentary, Florence: Second Prize, 1965

Above the Horizon (1964)

- Electronic, Nuclear and Teleradio Cinematographic Review, Rome: Best Film in the Scientific Category, 1970
- International Survey of Scientific and Didactic Films, Padua: First Prize, Didactic Films
- Australian and New Zealand Association for the Advancement of Science (ANZAAS), Sydney: Orbit Award, 1966
- 18th Canadian Film Awards, Montreal: Best Film for Children, 1966
- International Scientific Film Festival, Lyon: Honorable Mention for Popularization of a Scientific Subject, 1969
- International Exhibition of Scientific Film, Buenos Aires: Diploma of Honor, 1966

Nobody Waved Goodbye (1964)

- 18th British Academy Film Awards, London: BAFTA Award for Best Documentary, 1965
- Salerno Film Festival, Salerno: First Prize, 1968
- International Filmfestival Mannheim-Heidelberg, Mannheim: CIDALC Award, 1964
- International Film Festival at Addis Ababa, Addis Ababa: Third Prize, Feature Film, 1966
- Toronto International Film Festival, Toronto: 9th Place, Canada’s Ten-Best Films, 1984

Legault’s Place (1964)

- Melbourne Film Festival, Melbourne: Diploma of Merit, 1966
- Chicago International Film Festival, Chicago: Diploma of Merit, 1965

Stravinsky (1965)

- Montreal International Film Festival, Montreal: Special Mention, Short Films, 1965

Bargain Basement (1976)

- American Film and Video Festival, New York: Blue Ribbon, Fiction Films, 1977
- International Filmfestival Mannheim-Heidelberg, Mannheim: People’s College Diploma, 1976

For Gentlemen Only (1976)

- 27th Canadian Film Awards, Toronto - Genie Award for Best TV Drama, 1976

One Man (1977)

- ACTRA Awards, Montreal: Film of the Year, 1978
- Film Festival Antwerpen, Antwerp: Second Best Film of the Festival, 1978
- Film Festival Antwerpen, Antwerp: Honorable Mention by the Press Jury, 1978

Henry Ford's America (1977)

- International Emmy Awards, New York: Best Non-Fiction Television Film, 1977
- Golden Gate International Film Festival, San Francisco: Special Jury Award for Outstanding Achievement - Film as Communication, 1977
- Columbus International Film & Animation Festival, Columbus, Ohio: Chris Bronze Plaque, Social Studies, 1978
- HEMISFILM, San Antonio TX: Bronze Medallion for the Best Film, Documentary Over 27 Minutes, 1978
- American Film and Video Festival, New York: Red Ribbon, Features: History & Economics, 1978
- U.S. Industrial Film Festival, Elmhurst, Illinois: Silver Screen Award for Outstanding Creativity in the Production of Audio-Visual Communications in International Competition, 1978
- Chicago International Film Festival, Chicago: Certificate of Merit, 1977
- APGA Film Festival, Washington, DC: Honorable Mention, 1977

Voice of the Fugitive (1978)

- Banff World Media Festival, Banff, Alberta: Second Prize, Non-Serialized Drama, 1979

Teach Me to Dance (1978)

- Child of our Time Festival, Milan: Diploma of Honor, 1979

Revolution's Orphans (1979)

- Chicago International Film Festival, Chicago: Bronze Hugo, Short Subject - Drama, 1979

Why Men Rape (1979)

- American Film and Video Festival, New York: Red Ribbon, Mental Health, 1981

Bravery in the Field (1979)

- 1st Genie Awards, Toronto: Outstanding TV Drama Under 30 Minutes, 1980
- 52nd Academy Awards, Los Angeles: Nominee: Best Live Action Short Film, 1979

Challenger: An Industrial Romance (1980)

- Grierson Awards, Toronto: Grierson Award for Outstanding Documentary, 1981
- Columbus International Film & Animation Festival, Columbus, Ohio: Chris Bronze Plaque, 1981
- Golden Gate International Film Festival, San Francisco: Silver Award for Second-Best Film of the Festival, 1980
- Golden Gate International Film Festival, San Francisco: Best in Category: Promotion, Commercial Sales and Public Relations, 1980
- Information Film Producers of America, Los Angeles: Gold Cindy Award, Best of Show, 1981
- U.S. Industrial Film Festival, Elmhurst, Illinois: First Place, Gold Camera Award, 1981
- Bijou Awards, Toronto: Best Documentary, 1981
- Festival of Technical Films and Films on Industrial Design, Budapest: Special Prize, Informatory and Product-Propaganda Films, 1982
- American Film and Video Festival, New York: Honorable Mention, Management Training Films, 1982

Nose and Tina (1980)

- Yorkton Film Festival, Yorkton: Golden Sheaf Award for Best Film, Human Condition, 1981
- Bijou Awards, Toronto: Outstanding Documentary Under 30 Minutes, 1981
