= In the Labyrinth (film) =

- End credits title screen
- Directed by: Roman Kroitor; Colin Low; Hugh O'Connor
- Produced by: Tom Daly; Roman Kroitor
- Cinematography: Michel Thomas-d'Hoste; Walter Lassally; Gilles Gascon; Georges Dufaux; V.V. Dombrovsky; Alex O. Krasnov
- Edited by: Tom Daly
- Music by: Eldon Rathburn
- Distributed by: National Film Board of Canada
- Release dates: April 1967 (Expo 67); 1979 (single-screen version)
- Running time: 21 minutes
- Country: Canada
- Languages: English; French

In the Labyrinth (French: Dans le labyrinthe) is a 1967 Canadian experimental film presented at the multi-screen section of the Labyrinth pavilion at Expo 67 in Montreal, Quebec, Canada. It used 35 mm and 70 mm film projected simultaneously on multiple screens and was the precursor of today's IMAX format.

== History ==
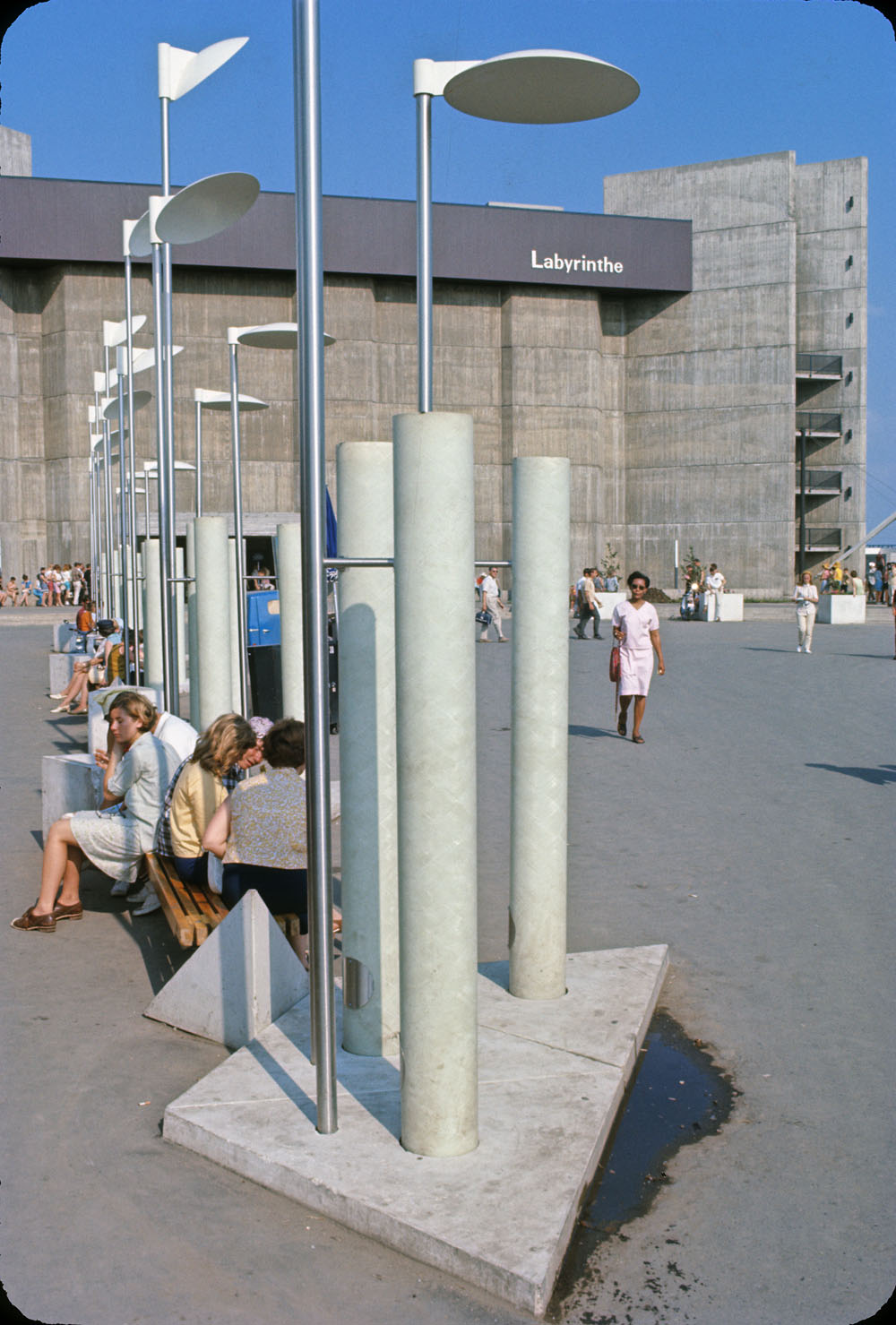
One of the highlights of Expo 67 was the Labyrinth Pavilion by the NFB.

Roman Kroitor created a six-screen exhibit to show National Film Board of Canada at the Canadian National Exhibition in 1963. He later proposed creating a screen that had a display with the maximum horizontal and vertical fields of vision, but was unable to gain financial backing until the NFB got a spot. He later proposed a Expo 67. He created Faces to show how his idea would work and it utilized two screens.

Kroitor, Low, and Hugh O'Connor started working on the project in January 1964, with Tom Daly executive producing. Northrop Frye was brought in to aid in planning the scenario and suggested seven psychological steps of initiation (origins, childhood, confident, youth, the desert, the battle with the dragon, death, and ascent or celebration through death). The film was then edited in a way that would be a modern interpretation of the murder of Minotaur by Theseus. Low was committed to In the Labyrinth and declined an offer to work on 2001: A Space Odyssey. NFB animator Ryan Larkin also designed animated sequences for the film.

Scenes for the exhibition were filmed in the United Kingdom, United States, Ethiopia, Japan, Cambodia, Greece, India, Soviet Union, Canada, and India. The NFB created the five-story Labyrinth pavillon inspired by the labyrinth of the Greek god Daedalus (where Minotaur's murder took place) consisting of three screening halls; Hall II specifically is an intermission hall between the first and third, backdropped by music reminiscent of In the Labyrinth, designed as an M-shaped maze with disorienting elements.

Hall I used 70 mm film while Hall 3 used 35 mm film. Each screens measured 11.5x6 meters. Hall I included eight balconies spanning four stories, five theatre sound systems, and 288 speakers. Hal III had five screens in the form of a cruciform that was 9m x 13m. The project cost $4.5 million (equivalent to $40,823,204 in 2025). The pavilion was attended by 1,324,560 people in 1967, and ran for 5,545 shows.

In the Labyrinth was reissued in a single-screen format in 1979. In May 2007, the NFB and the Cinémathèque québécoise presented an exhibition on the Labyrinth pavilion, marking the 40th anniversary of Expo 67. From September 18 to 30, 2017, during the 50th anniversary of Expo 67, the central square of Place des Arts was the site of a multi-screen NFB installation Expo 67 Live, partly inspired by In the Labyrinth.

== Reception ==
The New York Times stated that In the Labyrinth was "as special to Expo 67 as the Eiffel Tower was to the Paris Exposition of 1889", and Film Quarterly stated that it was "the most ambitious architectural-film relationship of all".

== Legacy ==
Observers from Japan, the host of Expo '70, were sent to see In the Labyrinth and Low was invited to advise. Kroitor and Donald Brittain, as producer and director respectively, created a film for the event. Kroitor, Graeme Ferguson, Robert Kerr, and William Shaw worked on a camera and projector system through their company IMAX Corporation. Tiger Child was completed after two years of development and they started selling the screens.

It inspired Canadian film-maker Norman Jewison to apply similar techniques to his film The Thomas Crown Affair.

== Works cited ==
- Evans, Gary (1991). In the National Interest: A Chronicle of the National Film Board of Canada from 1949 to 1989. University of Toronto Press. ISBN 0802027849.
- Graham, Gerald (1989). Canadian Film Technology, 1896-1986. University of Delaware Press. ISBN 0874133475.
