= 5th International Emmy Awards =

1977 awards ceremony

- Date: November 21, 1977

The 5th International Emmy Awards took place on November 21, 1977, in New York City. The award ceremony, presented by the International Academy of Television Arts and Sciences (IATAS), honors all programming produced and originally aired outside the United States.

== Ceremony ==
The 5th International Emmys ceremony took place on November 22, 1977, in New York City. The awards ceremony was organized by the International Academy of Television Arts and Sciences (IATAS). The award for best non-fiction program went to the Canadian documentary Henry Ford's America by filmmaker Donald Brittain. It is a co-production between the CBC network and the National Film Board, and was originally broadcast on November 28, 1976. The award for best fiction program was presented to The Collection by Harold Pinter, a British film produced by Grenada Television, with Laurence Olivier, Alan Bates, Helen Mirren and Malcolm McDowell in the lead roles.

== Winners ==
- Best Fiction Program: The Collection (Granada Television)
- Best Non-Fiction Program: Henry Ford's America (CBC Television)
- Directorate Award: Alphonse Ouimet (President of the CBC)
