= SANDDE =

Software and hardware system

SANDDE was a software and hardware system, developed primarily by IMAX Corporation, designed to create hand-drawn, stereoscopic 3D animation content. SANDDE is an acronym for "Stereoscopic ANimation Drawing DEvice" and is a play on the Japanese term for "3D", which is pronounced "San-D" (三デ).

The concept of SANDDE was to enable artists to draw and animate in three-dimensional space. It was intended to be intuitively usable, like a pencil: as an art creation tool, SANDDE incorporated aspects of drawing, painting, sculpture and puppetry. Unlike most other contemporary 3D computer graphic animation software, SANDDE did not require the construction of models from primitives. The main input device was a "wand" which allows the user to create drawings in the air.

Animators sat in virtual stereoscopic theaters and, using the wand, drew in space to create individual frames and then animated their creations using the interactive capabilities of the wand to create shots, sequences, and complete movies.

SANDDE was originally developed by IMAX in the mid-1990s, and was used to create one IMAX short Paint Misbehavin' (1997) and portions of two other IMAX feature films: Mark Twain's America (1998) and Cyberworld (2000). Thereafter, IMAX stopped active development of the system but provided licenses to the National Film Board of Canada for artistic experimentation. The NFB has used SANDDE in numerous stereoscopic productions including Falling in Love Again", Moonman, June, The Wobble Incident, Subconscious Password, and Minotaur. In 2007, IMAX spun off the Janro Imaging Laboratory to explore future development and commercial use of the application, including in Ultimate Wave 3D and Legends of Flight, both produced by the Stephen Low Company.
