= Richard Gelfond =

American business executive (born 1955)

- Gelfond in 2026
- Born: 1955 (age 70–71)
- Education: Northwestern University School of Law (JD); Stony Brook University (BAS)
- Occupations: Chief Executive Officer, IMAX Corporation

Richard L. Gelfond (born 1955) is an American business executive and the chief executive officer of IMAX Corporation.

== Early life and education ==
Gelfond was raised in Plainview, Long Island. He earned his bachelor's degree from Stony Brook University in 1976, and his Juris Doctor from Northwestern University School of Law in 1979.

== Career ==
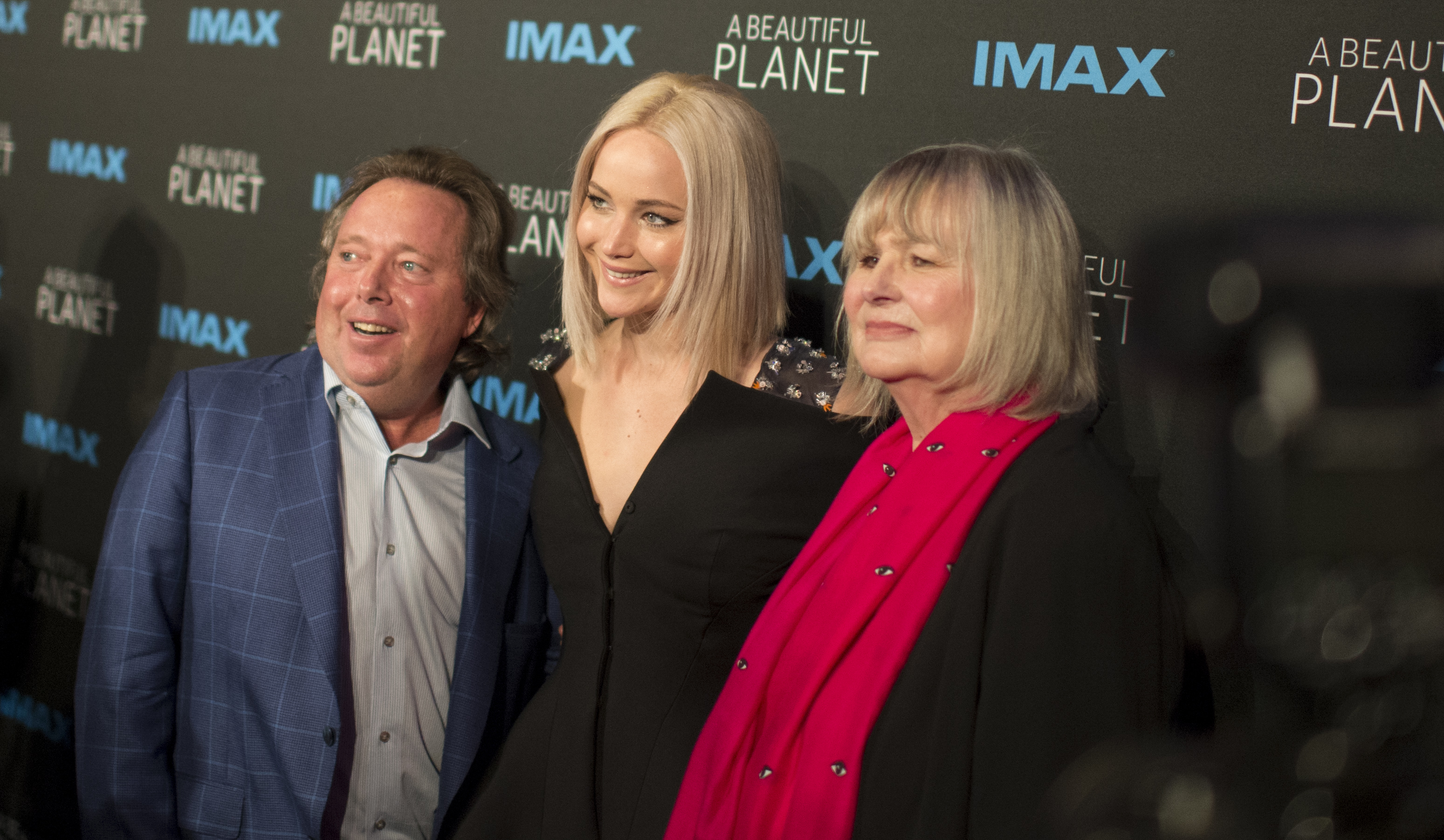
Gelfond (left) at A Beautiful Planet premiere in 2016

Gelfond started his career as a law clerk for U.S. Court of Appeals judge Max Rosenn. He later worked as a lawyer at Cleary Gottlieb and as an investment banker at Drexel Burnham Lambert. In early 1986, he founded Clean Street USA, a dry cleaning store chain in Long Island. In September 1986, he quit a law firm to help his brother David Gelfond manage the chain. By 1988, he was serving as president of the company.

Gelfond joined IMAX Corporation as vice chairman in 1994 when the investment company he co-founded and was a principal of acquired IMAX. He became co-CEO in 1996, and CEO in 2009. In 1996, Gelfond received an Academy Award on behalf of IMAX for Scientific and Technical Achievement.

== Other activities ==
In 1988, Gelfond was appointed chairman of the advisory board of the Business and Industry Center at Stony Brook University. He became chair of the board of trustees of the Stony Brook Foundation.

Gelfond was vice chairman of the board of trustees of the New York Historical Society. He is chairman of the steering committee of the Columbia Shuttle Memorial Trust.

== Personal life ==
Gelfond had high levels of mercury in his blood following a diet of "sushi twice a day for two decades".

== Awards ==
In 2004, Gelfond was awarded an honorary Doctor of Humane Letters degree by Stony Brook University.
