= IMAX China =

IMAX China Holding, Inc.
- Type: Public company (majority-owned subsidiary)
- Traded as: SEHK: 1970
- Industry: Motion picture production and exhibition
- Founded: 2011; 15 years ago
- Headquarters: Shanghai, China
- Key people: Daniel Manwaring (CEO)
- Parent: IMAX Corporation
- Website: imax.cn

IMAX China Holding, Inc. is the Greater China operating subsidiary of IMAX Corporation, the Canadian large-format cinema technology company. It licenses and operates IMAX theater systems in mainland China, Hong Kong, Macau, and Taiwan, and has traded separately on the Hong Kong Stock Exchange since 2015.

== History ==
On 8 October 2015, IMAX China listed on the Hong Kong Stock Exchange under ticker 1970, offering approximately 62 million shares (around 17.4% of the total) at HK$31 each and raising roughly $248 million; IMAX Corporation retained a majority stake following the offering.

In July 2023, IMAX Corporation, which by then held approximately 71% of IMAX China's shares, proposed to acquire the remaining publicly held shares and take the subsidiary fully private, offering HK$10 per share in cash — roughly a third of the 2015 IPO price, though a premium of about 49% over recent trading levels — in a deal valuing the outstanding minority shares at approximately $124 million. IMAX cited weak appreciation of the stock by Hong Kong capital markets and declining sell-side analyst coverage as motivations. Although the proposal won support from roughly 70% of votes cast by disinterested shareholders (there was 61% vote participation by disinterested shareholders), it fell short of the threshold required under Hong Kong takeover rules, and the transaction was formally terminated later that year; IMAX China has continued to trade on the Hong Kong Stock Exchange since.

== Operations ==
IMAX China's theater network has continued to expand; as of 2026, IMAX systems operated in nearly 800 locations across China. The Chinese box office has become one of IMAX's largest and most closely watched markets, and the company has reported record results there alongside record global box office performance in 2025.

== Leadership ==
Jiande Chen served as IMAX China's first chief executive from the company's 2011 founding, subsequently moving to the role of vice chairman focused on government and industry relations. Edwin Tan succeeded him as CEO, effective 9 December 2019. Daniel Manwaring, formerly of Creative Artists Agency, was named CEO in December 2022.
