= IMAX Corporation =

Canadian theatre company

- Type: Public
- Traded as: NYSE: IMAX; Russell 2000 component
- Industry: Motion picture production and exhibition
- Predecessor: Multi-Screen Corporation, IMAX Systems Corporation
- Founded: August 20, 1967; 59 years ago in Montreal, Quebec, Canada
- Founders: Graeme Ferguson; Roman Kroitor; Robert Kerr; William Shaw
- Headquarters: Mississauga, Ontario, Canada (global); Los Angeles, California, United States (Corporate)
- Area served: Worldwide
- Key people: Darren Throop (chairman); Richard Gelfond (CEO)
- Products: Special-venue films and movie theatres
- Revenue: ▲US$410 million (2025)
- Net income: ▲US$34.9 million (2025)
- Owner: Kevin Douglas (14.67%)
- Number of employees: 700 (2024)
- Divisions: IMAX, IMAX 3D, IMAX Dome, IMAX DMR, IMAX at AMC (joint venture with AMC Theatres), IMAX Enhanced (joint venture with DTS)
- Subsidiaries: IMAX Filmed Entertainment; Ridefilm Corporation; Sonics Associates; David Keighley Productions; 3D Entertainment; Ssimwave
- Website: imax.com

IMAX Corporation is a Canadian production theatre company which designs and manufactures IMAX cameras and projection systems as well as performing film development, production, post-production and distribution to IMAX-affiliated theatres worldwide. Founded in Montreal in 1967, it is headquartered in Mississauga in the Greater Toronto Area, with operations in New York City and Los Angeles.

As of November 2025, there were 1,759 IMAX theatres located in 90 countries, of which 1,693 were in commercial multiplexes. These include IMAX variations such as IMAX 3D, IMAX Dome, and Digital IMAX. The CEO is Richard Gelfond.

== History ==
IMAX is a Canadian corporation that is based in Mississauga, Ontario. The company was founded in 1967 when three filmmakers—Graeme Ferguson, Roman Kroitor and Robert Kerr—incorporated IMAX Corporation. The idea and the new technology, which resulted in the birth of the company, came from the multi-screen productions of Roman Kroitor, Colin Low and Hugh O'Connor. In the Labyrinth and Ferguson's Man and the Polar Regions (on which Robert Kerr collaborated), both screened at the Expo 67. From their experience, Graeme Ferguson, Roman Kroitor and Robert Kerr realized that new technology would be necessary to develop a larger and more complex project than previously seen. As a result, they sought an engineer named William Shaw in 1968 (he had gone to Galt Collegiate Institute in Galt, Ontario, now Cambridge, with Ferguson and Kerr) to help develop this technology. Shaw created this new projector that allowed for films to have exceptional quality and to be ten times larger than conventional 35mm picture frames. The first movie IMAX Corporation produced using this new technology was Tiger Child, which was featured at Expo '70 in Osaka, Japan. It was because of the multi-screen viewing that Graeme Ferguson, Roman Kroitor and Robert Kerr wanted to create a theatre with giant screens, surround sound and stadium seating.

William Shaw was instrumental in helping IMAX Corporation fulfill its ambitions in creating larger and more realistic experiences for audience which included oversized screens, surround sound and steep seating for better viewing. Shaw remained at IMAX (although officially retired) as a designer and inventor until his death on August 31, 2002, at the age of 73. Before retiring, Shaw created a 3D camera which was sent to the International Space Station for IMAX films. In 1994, investment bankers Gelfond and Bradley Wechsler acquired IMAX Corporation through a leveraged buyout and publicly listed the company on the NASDAQ stock exchange. IMAX then began to focus their abilities on attracting Hollywood production houses. Another engineer at IMAX Corporation, Brian Bonnick, Chief Technology Officer at IMAX Corporation, developed technologies that made it possible for the worldwide IMAX to produce major Hollywood films. More flexible technology required by that industry led to the development of the IMAX DMR (Digital Re-Mastering), which was able to adapt quickly in various locations. Newer technology followed, including the IMAX Experience and the IMAX MPX theatre system. Revamped IMAX 2D footage has been transferred into IMAX 3D. In September 2022, IMAX Corporation acquired streaming technology company Ssimwave for $21 million in a cash and stock deal.

=== Recent milestones ===
- In April 2009, Gelfond became the sole IMAX CEO and Wechsler moved into the role of chairman of the board of directors.
- Later in 2009, IMAX participated in the movie Avatar, to which the company credits its mainstream Hollywood success.
- In March 2011, IMAX noted that China's Wanda Cinema Line announced a 75-theatre deal with IMAX Corporation.
- In 2012, IMAX opened its first location in Tianjin, China.
- On October 8, 2015, IMAX China, a subsidiary of the company, was listed on the Hong Kong Stock Exchange. According to The Hollywood Reporter and The Wall Street Journal, "IMAX China raised $248 million in its initial public offering," which was the "bottom of [the] indicative price range."
- As of December 2019, there were 1,624 theatres in 81 countries and territories.

== Co-productions ==
In November 2016, Marvel Television and IMAX announced the live action television series Marvel's Inhumans, based on the superhero race of the same name. The series, co-produced with ABC Studios, saw IMAX serve as a financing partner, a first for IMAX, which allowed Marvel to spend more on the series than it had on its other television series, especially for visual effects. The entire series was filmed with IMAX digital cameras. Inhumans debuted an edited specific for theatrical-release version of the first two episodes. The episodes debuted on IMAX screens in theatres worldwide in September 2017, with the series airing weekly on ABC afterwards. After the poor reception to the IMAX version of the first two episodes and a box office gross of $3.5 million, Richard Gelfond said, "Going forward, we intend to take a more conservative approach consistent with the Game of Thrones approach to capital investments and content. We will be more conservative when considering whether to invest our own capital; and if so, to what extent."

== Business ==
IMAX generates revenue primarily through two segments: Technology Products and Services, and Content Solutions.

=== Theater systems: sales, rentals, and revenue sharing ===
IMAX theater systems are installed under several different commercial arrangements. Under a joint revenue sharing arrangement (JRSA), IMAX installs a system at little or no upfront cost to the exhibitor and instead takes a percentage of gross box office receipts; as of 2026, slightly under half of the company's roughly 1,876 locations operated under this model.

=== Content Solutions and DMR ===
IMAX's Content Solutions business generates revenue primarily through DMR (Digital Media Remastering) conversion fees for remastering conventional films for IMAX release, typically around 12.5% of a film's gross box office receipts, with lower rates in Greater China. The company's theater network grew from 299 locations in 2008, when the introduction of digital projection allowed systems to be retrofitted into existing multiplexes without the cost of new construction, to approximately 1,876 locations by 2026.

=== IMAX Enhanced ===
In September 2018, IMAX and DTS launched IMAX Enhanced, a licensing and certification program for home entertainment products and content. Modeled on THX's home-theater certification program, IMAX Enhanced certifies audio-video hardware that meets defined performance standards and pairs it with IMAX-remastered 4K high-dynamic-range content, using a variant of the DTS:X audio codec. Launch partners included Sony Electronics, Sony Pictures, Paramount Pictures, and Sound United (parent of Denon and Marantz). For example, streaming platform Disney Plus offers films in IMAX format.

=== Acquisitions ===
In September 2022, IMAX acquired SSIMWAVE, a Canadian AI company that provides video quality technology company that spun out of the University of Waterloo, for approximately $21 million ($18.5 million in cash and $2.5 million in stock, plus up to $4 million in performance incenetives). SSIMWAVE's software assesses and enhances video quality for streaming and broadcast delivery, with clients including Disney, Paramount Global, Warner Bros. Discovery, and Comcast/NBCUniversal. IMAX CEO Richard Gelfond described the deal as part of a broader shift toward technology licensing, stating "we are not a theater exhibitor, but a technology licensing company."

=== IMAX China privatization attempt ===
In July 2023, IMAX Corporation announced a proposal to acquire full ownership of its Hong Kong-listed subsidiary, IMAX China, in which it already held a 71% stake. The offer valued the remaining shares at HK$10 per share in cash, a premium of roughly 49% over the 30-trading-day average closing price, for a total transaction value of approximately $124 million. IMAX cited weak appreciation of IMAX China's stock by Chinese capital markets and declining sell-side analyst coverage as motivations for the deal.

Although the proposal received 70% approval from shareholders shareholders, it fell short of the threshold required under Hong Kong takeover regulations, and the transaction was formally terminated. CEO Richard Gelfond said the company remained committed to its China operations and would explore alternative uses for the earmarked capital, including potential share buybacks of IMAX Corporation stock.

== See also ==
- 3net
