= Challenger: An Industrial Romance =

- Screenshot: Title frame
- Directed by: Stephen Low
- Written by: Stephen Low
- Produced by: Roman Kroitor; Harry Gulkin
- Narrated by: Stephen Low
- Cinematography: Andreas Poulsson
- Edited by: Roger Hart
- Production company: National Film Board of Canada
- Distributed by: Canadian Broadcasting Corporation / CBC Television
- Release date: 1980
- Running time: 57 min., 23 sec.
- Country: Canada
- Language: English

Challenger: An Industrial Romance is a 1980 Canadian documentary film, produced by the National Film Board of Canada (NFB). The documentary follows the development of Canadair's Challenger, a business jet airliner.

== Synopsis ==
The new Canadair Challenger business jet, which emerged from a moribund aviation company in the 1970s, was a risky proposition when it was first conceived. Derived from a design by American inventor and aircraft developer Bill Lear, Canadair Chief Designer Harry Halton married a wide-body fuselage with a high-performance ("supercritical") wing and state-of-the-art engines. With banks and the then federal Minister of Industry, Trade and Commerce Jean Chrétien requiring 50 "firm orders," a Canadair sales team was dispatched to sell a "paper aircraft" with only sales brochures, scale models and a wooden mock-up to go on. The innovative Challenger design boasted industry-leading performance. It promised to be faster, cheaper to fly, and more comfortable than any other business jet.

With orders of 56 aircraft from North America, Europe and the Middle East, Canadair's top management, headed by Frederick Kearns, gave a "go" to the Challenger project. As the first prototype was completed, competitors touted their "off-the-shelf" availability. Although months late, the Challenger was finally unveiled and prepared for its maiden flight, piloted by Canadair Chief Test Pilot Doug Adkins. After successful tests at the company plant in Montreal, the Challenger was flown to Mojave, California, to complete its arduous flight testing in order to obtain its certification for worldwide operation.

== Cast ==
- Jean Chrétien, Minister of Industry, Trade and Commerce
- Frederick Kearns, Canadair President
- Harry Halton, Canadair Chief Designer
- Stephanie Halton, wife of Harry Halton
- Bill Lear, American inventor and aircraft developer
- Jim Taylor, Canadair Sales Manager
- Jock West, Canadair Deputy Program Manager
- Conrad Kunze, Canadair engineer
- Ira Herzog, Wendy's CEO
- Aziz Ojjeh, Canadair Middle East sales
- Mansour Ojjeh, Canadair Middle East sales
- Al Stone, Canadair Experimental Engineering
- Doug Adkins, Canadair Chief Test Pilot

== Production ==
Stephen Low began work in 1977 on the film after seeing an article in The Globe and Mail on the Challenger project. After successfully approaching Canadair with his idea for a documentary, Low was able obtain support from Roman Kroitor, head of the drama studio at the National Film Board of Canada. Kroiter would later act as the executive producer on the project. Additional support came from the Department of Industry, Trade and Commerce and Minister Jean Chrétien, who agreed to finance the film as a co-production with the NFB.

Low submitted a proposal for a one-hour film for television and a 10-minute version for theatrical release. Filming throughout a three-year span, he concentrated on the human aspects of a highly technological achievement, focusing on the individuals who designed, built, flew and ultimately sold the Challenger to a global market. Notable for the use of the newly developed 70 mm Astro-Vision system, Clay Lacy Aviation Inc., in partnership with Continental Camera Inc., filmed the aerial scenes over the Mojave Desert. The strains of Pachelbel's Canon ends the film.

== Reception ==
Challenger: An Industrial Romance was broadcast on the Canadian Broadcasting Corporation on July 9, 1980, to excellent reviews. The following January, a French version also played on Radio-Canada, also garnering top reviews. The film was also broadcast on PBS. The film was edited into a 1980 30-minute short version of the same name, requested by NFB distribution in New York. "Low worked with an editor and r-wrote the narration but was never happy with this version as he felt it was not long enough to properly tell the story." Next Generation, a separate 10-minute theatrical film consisting primarily of the aerial footage of the flight testing over the Mojave Desert, played in Canadian theatres throughout 1983 and 1984, as well as in Australia and New Zealand.

== Awards ==
- Grierson Awards, Toronto: Grierson Award for Outstanding Documentary, 1981
- Columbus International Film & Animation Festival, Columbus, Ohio: Chris Bronze Plaque, 1981
- Golden Gate International Film Festival, San Francisco: Silver Award for Second-Best Film of the Festival, 1980
- Golden Gate International Film Festival, San Francisco: Best in Category: Promotion, Commercial Sales and Public Relations, 1980
- Information Film Producers of America, Los Angeles: Gold Cindy Award, Best of Show, 1981
- U.S. Industrial Film Festival, Elmhurst, Illinois: First Place, Gold Camera Award, 1981
- Bijou Awards, Toronto: Best Documentary, 1981
- Festival of Technical Films and Films on Industrial Design, Budapest: Special Prize, Informatory and Product-Propaganda Films, 1982
- American Film and Video Festival, New York: Honorable Mention, Management Training Films, 1982
