= Henry Ford's America =

- Directed by: Donald Brittain
- Written by: Donald Brittain; Ralph Thomas
- Produced by: Donald Brittain; Paul Wright; Roman Kroitor
- Starring: Donald Brittain; Robert H. Schuller
- Cinematography: Andreas Poulsson
- Edited by: Les Halman; Rosemarie Shapley; Bill Graziadei (sound)
- Music by: Art Phillips
- Production company: National Film Board of Canada
- Distributed by: National Film Board of Canada
- Release date: October 1977; (CBC Television)
- Running time: 56 minutes
- Country: Canada
- Language: English

Henry Ford's America is a 1977 Canadian documentary film produced by the National Film Board of Canada and directed by Donald Brittain, and produced by Brittain, Paul Wright and Roman Kroitor. It has been called one of the best documentaries ever made about the Ford Motor Company and North American car culture.

== Synopsis ==
This feature documentary studies the automobile and its pervasive effect on the history of North America and how society has adapted to fit its needs. Focusing on the Ford dynasty, from the original Henry car through to Henry II, the film traces the history of the company using historical footage, and interviews with Henry Ford II and other executives; it includes rare and candid glimpses of Henry Ford, Edsel Ford, Lee Iacocca and General Motors president Pete Estes. It explores the troubled state of the American auto industry in the 1970s, and our culture’s conflicted relationship with the automobile.

== Awards ==
- International Emmy Awards, New York: Best Non-Fiction Television Film, 1977
- Golden Gate International Film Festival, San Francisco: Special Jury Award for Outstanding Achievement - Film as Communication, 1977
- Columbus International Film & Animation Festival, Columbus, Ohio: Chris Bronze Plaque, Social Studies, 1978
- HEMISFILM, San Antonio TX: Bronze Medallion for the Best Film, Documentary Over 27 Minutes, 1978
- American Film and Video Festival, New York: Red Ribbon, Features: History & Economics, 1978
- U.S. Industrial Film Festival, Elmhurst, Illinois: Silver Screen Award for Outstanding Creativity in the Production of Audio-Visual Communications in International Competition, 1978
- Chicago International Film Festival, Chicago: Certificate of Merit, 1977
- APGA Film Festival, Washington, DC: Honorable Mention, 1977
