= CyberWorld =

- Theatrical release poster
- Directed by: Colin Davies; Elaine Despins
- Screenplay by: Charlie Rubin; Steve Hoban; Hugh Murray
- Story by: Hugh Murray; Todd Alcott; Additional story work: Mark Smith
- Produced by: Steve Hoban; Hugh Murray
- Starring: Jenna Elfman; Matt Frewer; Robert Smith; Dave Foley
- Music by: Paul Haslinger; Hummie Mann
- Production companies: DreamWorks Animation (credit only); Intel; EyeTide Media; ZeoCast; IMAX Sandde Animation; Spin Entertainment; Consolidated Film Industries; Pacific Data Images (Antz and Homer³ segment)
- Distributed by: IMAX Corporation; 20th Century Fox (credit only)
- Release date: October 6, 2000
- Running time: 44 minutes
- Country: United States
- Language: English
- Box office: $16.7 million

CyberWorld is a 2000 American 3D animated anthology film shown in IMAX and IMAX 3D, presented by Intel. Several segments originally filmed in 2D were converted to 3D format by IMAX. As presented on its website, it was labelled the first 3D animated film in IMAX.

== Plot ==
A guide named Phig commences the movie by showing the audience the "CyberWorld", a futuristic museum of infinite possibilities. Meanwhile, three mischievous computer bugs (Buzzed, Wired, and Frazzled) try to eat the CyberWorld through its number coding. When Phig learns about them, she goes on the hunt for the destructive computer bugs while presenting various short premade clips of computer-animated productions, such as scenes from Antz and "Homer³" from The Simpsons.

In the end, Buzzed, Wired and Frazzled create a black hole (the one seen in "Homer³"), which kills them. Phig almost gets swallowed up in the hole, but not before her "knight in cyber armor," technician Hank, reboots the entire system just as she gets sucked up into the vortex. Phig concludes the movie by announcing to the audience that they will have no more problems. However, when she mentions her battle gear, she receives a pink bunny outfit in return (a similar trick the bugs played on her in the film's midsection).

=== Selected segments ===
- The dance sequence from the animated feature Antz
- The CGI parts of the "Homer³" segment from The Simpsons episode "Treehouse of Horror VI"
- The music video of the Pet Shop Boys song "Liberation"
- "Monkey Brain Sushi", a short film created by Brummbaer at Sony Pictures Imageworks
- KraKKen: Adventure of Future Ocean, a short film created by ExMachina
- "Joe Fly", a short film created By Spans & Partner
- "Flipbook and Waterfall City", a short film created by Satoshi Kitahara
- "Tonight's Performance", a short film created by REZN8 specifically for the film

== Cast ==
- Jenna Elfman as Phig
- Matt Frewer as Frazzled
- Robert Smith as Buzzed and Wired
- Dave Foley as Hank the Technician
- Cara Pifko as Computer

=== Archive audio ===
- Woody Allen, Sharon Stone, and Sylvester Stallone (Antz)
- Hank Azaria, Nancy Cartwright, Dan Castellaneta, Julie Kavner, Harry Shearer, and Yeardley Smith of The Simpsons
- Chris Lowe and Neil Tennant of Pet Shop Boys
- David Geldart as Pete
- Richard Pearce as Joe Fly
- Ned Irving as Sanchez
- Mark Lyndon as The Praying Mantis
- Georg Hahn as The Mites
- Frank Welker as The Firefly

== Release ==
CyberWorld premiered at the 18-screen Cineplex Odeon IMAX theater at Universal CityWalk Hollywood on October 1, 2000. It is the first IMAX film with a PG rating (some language from the Antz and Simpsons segments).

== Reception ==
=== Box office ===
CyberWorld was a box office success, grossing $11,253,900 in the domestic box office and $5,400,000 overseas for a worldwide total of $16,653,900.

=== Critical response ===
On Rotten Tomatoes, it has an approval rating of 55% based on 11 reviews, with an average rating of 6.18/10. On Metacritic, the film has a weighted average score of 55/100 based on 13 critics, indicating "mixed or average" reviews.

Roger Ebert, writing for the Chicago Sun-Times, praised the film for accurately presenting what 3D technology is capable of. He particularly singled out the size of the IMAX screens the film was projected on. He wrote, "(The film) takes advantage of the squarish six-story screen to envelop us in the images; the edges of the frame don't have the same kind of distracting cutoff power they possess in the smaller rectangles of conventional theatres."

Contrarily, Paul Tatara of CNN.com was displeased with the film's over-reliance on 3D effects, continuing to say, "Unfortunately, you can't escape the sensation that you might end up wearing the contents of your stomach while you watch it."
