= Falling in Love Again (2003 film) =

2003 animated film

Falling in Love Again is a 2003 animated stereoscopic 3D film directed by Munro Ferguson, about a man and woman tossed aloft during a car crash, who fall in love while plummeting to the ground. Set to the song Falling in Love Again (Can't Help It) as sung by Marlene Dietrich, it was created by Ferguson at the National Film Board of Canada, using IMAX's SANDDE stereoscopic drawing system. It won a Canadian Genie Award for Best Animated Short in 2003. It was also included in the Animation Show of Shows.
