= Robert Kerr (Canadian politician) =

Canadian politician and businessman (1929–2010)

2nd Mayor of Cambridge, Ontario
- In office 1975–1976
- Preceded by: Claudette Millar
- Succeeded by: Erwin Nelson

Personal details
- Born: August 28, 1929 Galt, Ontario, Canada
- Died: April 29, 2010 (aged 80)
- Profession: businessman, film producer

Robert John Kerr (August 28, 1929 – April 29, 2010) was a Canadian politician and businessman, most noted as the second mayor of Cambridge, Ontario, in 1975 and 1976, and as a co-founder with Graeme Ferguson, Roman Kroitor and William C. Shaw of the IMAX company.

The owner of a printing business, Kerr served as mayor of Galt, one of the towns that would later be amalgamated into Cambridge, from 1964 to 1967. Late in Kerr's term, Ferguson, a childhood friend, approached him for assistance in producing the experimental documentary film Polar Life for Expo 67, with the collaboration ultimately leading to the development of IMAX technology.

As mayor of Cambridge, Kerr was noted for his prominent role in the development of the city's Mill Race Park, following the disastrous Grand River flood of 1974. According to Claudette Millar, Kerr's predecessor as mayor, while her council had voted to support the initial motion to create the park, its successful construction and opening owed much more to Kerr's efforts; according to Millar, "if it weren’t for him it could have been a blank wall".

Following two years as mayor of Cambridge, Kerr devoted his efforts to the IMAX company rather than continuing in politics. From 1967 to 1994, he served as chairman, chairman emeritus, president and chief executive officer of IMAX. After his retirement, he endowed bursaries for high school students at all of Cambridge's high schools, as well as the Stanley Knowles Visiting Professorship in Canadian Studies at the University of Waterloo.

Following his death in 2010, Cambridge, Ontario City Council approved the placement of a memorial stone to Kerr in the park, and the city's Grand River Film Festival paid tribute to his role in film history by staging a special gala screening of the Cambridge-shot film Saint Ralph with guest speakers including Ferguson.
