= Combinatory literature =

Type of fiction writing

Combinatory literature is a type of fiction writing in which the author relies and draws on concepts outside of general writing practices and applies them to the creative process. This method of writing challenges conventional structuralist processes and approaches. To do this, the author investigates alternate disciplines outside the common channels of creative writing and literature, notably mathematics, science and other humanities. The author then applies constraints or influences from the new concepts to their writing process. This inspires creativity in literature regarding form, structure, language and narrative plot, among other things. The emergence of combinatory literature is largely the result of philosophers and intellectuals who have been concerned with the interrelated nature of disciplines and the way these combine to affect brain function. Notable proponents of combinatory literature include T. S. Eliot, Georges Perec and Italo Calvino, whilst modern writers like George Saunders have credited having a multiple disciplinary background as influential on their work.

== History ==
=== 13th Century ===
Combinatory literature first emerged with the work of 13th century writer and philosopher Ramon Llull, who attempted to combine philosophical and religious reasoning with a mechanical device known as a zairja. Eighteen core questions of morality were considered, accompanied by both religious and philosophical responses. The user was then guided by visual aids and charts leading from each of these questions to a response, with the intention of definitively answering any question or doubt regarding morality that the user might encounter. Llull combined writings with logical argumentation derived from an algorithmic process to create a tool for converting Muslims to Christianity. He believed the user would arrive at true knowledge. The approach of combining different fields of thought, in that case mathematics with writing, whilst unsuccessful for Llull, would resurface in the 17th century and encourage philosophers toward a similarly cross-discipline approach to addressing problems and inspiring creativity.

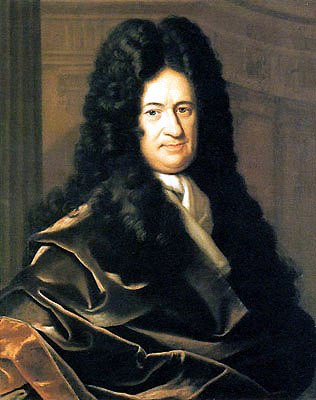
Philosopher Gottfried Leibniz drew on mathematics principles to answer philosophical questions

=== 17th Century ===
In the 17th century, philosopher Thomas Hobbes wrote De Corpore, which covers his work on logic and reasoning. He concluded that the process of reasoning was natural computing. This computing involved the subconscious summation of one's experience, followed by the systematic elimination of irrelevant information of this experience until an appropriate conclusion was derived. This provided important framework, identifying brain function as not limited to a singular discipline or focus, and in arguing that knowledge is the combination of thought processes. This concept of battling internal processes would later become widely accepted as the philosophical basis for combinatory play in general, and later argued that the same approach applies to creativity and creative writing. At the same time as Hobbes, philosophers Georg Philipp Harsdörffer, Philipp von Zesen and Justus Georg Schottelius of the Baroque Period were the first to identify the inherent lack of creativity within the structure of words, and how limiting that came to be for the writer. They suggested the first naturally occurring constraint to producing literature of any kind was the type, structure and formation of words themselves. Thus the creativity and imagination of the writer was limited by the words they could use. In particular, Harsdörffer suggested that there was nothing that the writer could devise "the likes of which had not been already". To combat this, Harsdörffer rolled dice, with syllables on each face instead of numbers and then, combining the syllables, invented new words that did not conventionally apply to the lexicon. Harsdörffer specifically borrowed the mathematical constructs of chance and probability to create new words through his version of a word game.

In 1666, philosopher Gottfried Wilhelm Leibniz published his Dissertation on the Art of Combinations, which acted as the foundation on which he developed the "art of combinations". In it, Leibniz borrows basic permutation theory from mathematics and applies it to other disciplines, such as theology, law and philosophy. Leibniz demonstrates the existence of God with a series of numbered postulations and corollary hypotheses that cancel out one another or rely on, and build on, one another in order to reach a conclusion. The logical construction of approaching a mathematical problem is borrowed, and applied to a philosophical dilemma. Writing for The Public Domain Review (2011), Jonathan Gray compares Leibniz's work to Llull's earlier attempt, noting that Leibniz had desired to build on from Llull's previous work.

=== 19th & 20th Century ===
In the 19th century, the notion of combinatory play became widely accepted through the advocacy of intellects and academics, such as Albert Einstein and T.S. Eliot. Einstein claimed that "combinatory play seems to be the essential feature in productive thought". This is because Einstein famously came up with important scientific theories while taking violin breaks, and believed the secondary discipline of music helped connect the different processes in his brain, allowing him to think more broadly about a subject. Similarly, T.S. Eliot believed that the way one thinks or approaches creativity was largely impacted by the life experience unique to that individual. The end product of the thought process was then specific to that person. This is an extension of Hobbes' theory of reasoning, mentioned earlier. The culmination of ones experience impacts the way one naturally attempts to approach creativity.

=== 21st Century ===
It was not until the 1960s that the combinatory literature movement rose to popularity through the French literary group the Oulipo. The Oulipo took the ideas presented by predecessors Leibniz and Harsdörffer to recognize that writing is always naturally constrained, be it by language as Harsdörffer suggested or some other constraint. Instead of being restricted by these constraints, the Oulipian's developed an approach that not only identified but embraced the constraints, purposefully placing themselves under both small and immense constraints in their approach to writing. These constraints are intentionally taken from other disciplines. They believe that the new constraints they apply to literature focus not on what literature is, but "attempt to uncover what it could be, either in theory or practice".

== Theory ==
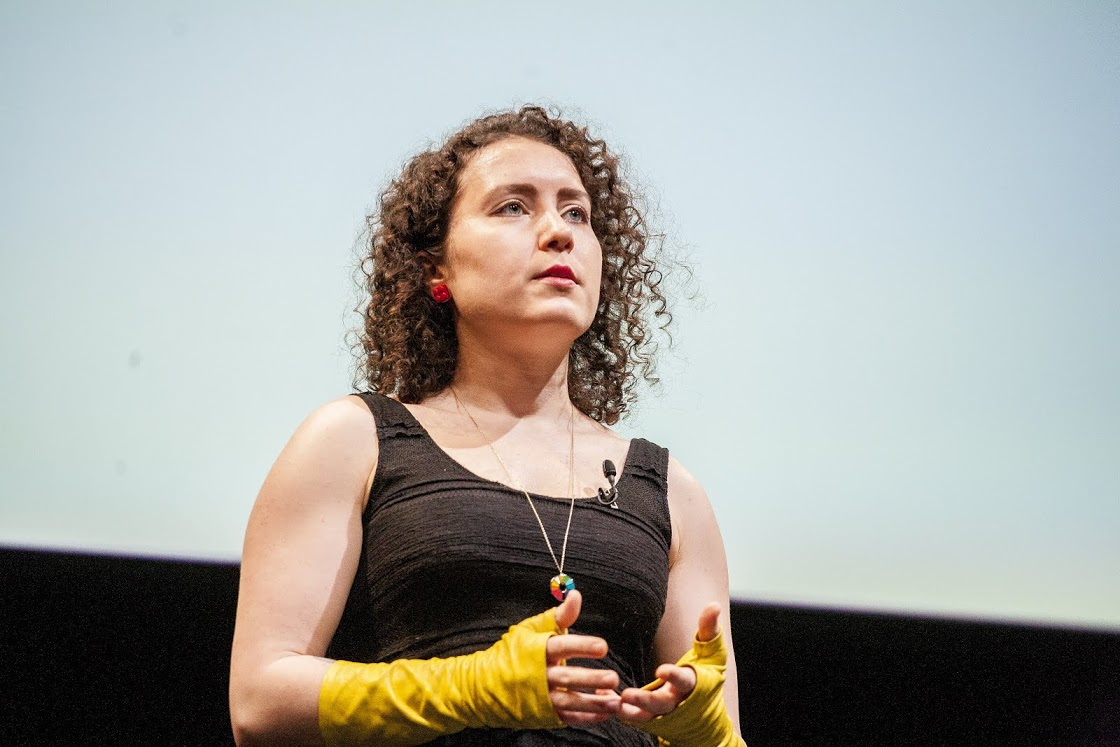
Maria Popova, an advocate for the combinatory play approach to creativity

Combinatory literature is similar in theory to combinatory play, however it has one key distinction. As Maria Popova explains, combinatory play relies on a component of distraction. Writing for Brain Pickings, Popova explores how distraction was used by Einstein to distance himself from his work. The result was that he gained valuable insight from the change in perspective. Popova argues that using distraction by combining disciplines is the approach to creativity that is taken by advocates of combinatory play. Whilst similar, the notable difference for writers of combinatory literature is that in order to seek new perspectives, they adopt the influence or constraint from another discipline into their work. The creative process is therefore not simply a temporary shift from one discipline and into another as Popova explains it is for combinatory play.

Focusing on the formation of combinatory literature, Peter Gendolla and Jörgen Schäfer, who wrote The Aesthetics of Net Literature, discuss how the initial attempt at creative writing is the result of internal computation and the processing of one's experience, exposure to the world and personal subjectivity. They argue that the author's experience and perception of the world subtly and often unconsciously emerges through their writing. What appears in the first instance of creative writing is in fact computation of the world around them. On this basis it is not as creative as first assumed. Combinatory writing attempts to address this. Writing for Wired magazine in 2003, Karen Kreamer says that former Apple CEO Steve Jobs, who was an advocate for combinatory play, credits creativity as the ability to "connect experiences and synthesize new things". She says in order to think creatively, a broad experience is required. As an extension of the theory of combinatory play, combinatory writing recognises both the requirement for creativity as well as the traditional, inherently personal approach to creative writing. To address these, combinatory writing seeks a broad, interdisciplinary solution that connects experience, as credited to the creative theory behind combinatory play by Kreamer and Jobs. This is done by adopting the rhetoric, principle, process or element originating from an unrelated discipline and connecting it to the writing process or as structure to the piece itself. Andrew Gallix, writing for The Guardian, says that by relying on unusual practices and ideas from other disciplines that adjust the natural limitations the writer faces, the writer is encouraged or forbidden by circumstances to write a particular way. Reference to these disciplines replaces conventional constraints with those generally unrelated to the writing discipline. By inhibiting oneself, the author is forced to proactively engage with these constraints. This creates a work of literature that defies conventional, traditional narrative structure, form or voice, among other features, as the work takes on elements it would not previously or naturally have been subject to.

== Examples ==
Examples of combinatory literature are diverse, exploring various combinations among numerous disciplines. There are several notable works of combinatory literature that rely on adjusting writing constraints and structural influences, or apply principles from mathematics. For a complete list of structural, language-based writing constraints and examples, see constrained writing.

=== Writing constraints ===
Georges Perec relied on the mathematical problem The Knights Tour for the structure of his novel Life A User's Manual

In an advanced case of constrained writing, Italian writer Italo Calvino removes the voice from his characters in his novel The Castle of Crossed Destinies. Each character, upon arriving in an enchanted forest, can only communicate their story through the placing down of tarot cards. Given the finite amount of tarot cards in a deck, each following character must, upon explaining their story of arrival in the forest, increasingly rely on the stories that came before it. At the conclusion of the novel, the stories can be read backwards to different meanings. As explored by academic Joann Cannon, Calvino explicitly forces himself to tell a story through characters without giving them a voice, and the sole reliance on tarot cards and their interpretation enables him to construct a narrative in which his characters' stories change upon each consecutive reading.

In 1969 Georges Perec, French novelist and member of the Oulipo, wrote his work La Disparition (A Void). The lipogrammatic novel is written without the vowel 'e' appearing.

=== Mathematics-based constraints ===
French author Raymond Queneau, upon writing his famous Cent mille milliards de poèmes (Hundred Thousand Billion Poems) enlisted the help of friend, writer and chemical engineer Francois Le Lionnais, whose mathematical background assisted Queneau with the structure and completion of the book of poetry. These two later became the founding members of the Oulipo.

Georges Perec was also keenly interested in applications of mathematical problems when it concerned his creative writing. His novel Life a User's Manual explores an apartment building floor plan that doubles as an enlarged ten-by-ten chess board. Each chapter explores a new room of the apartment building, but each room can only be visited once. Perec relies on the mathematical process of a knights tour to visit each room. According to the knights tour dilemma, there is a specific sequence of moves for which a knight on a chessboard can visit each square but once, completing the board and arriving at the square beside the one it began on.

David Foster Wallace, known for his mathematics background, structured the chapters of his novel Infinite Jest following the model of the Sierpinski Gasket, a fractal structure involving recursive subdivision of equilateral triangles.

== Notable proponents ==
Including those already mentioned, there are a number of further individuals who are strong proponents of combinatory literature. These include:

- Harry Matthews, the American author whose work manipulates language and relies on mathematical structures
- Kenneth Goldsmith is an American poet who believes in uncreative writing, rejecting the traditional conventions of creative writing and reshaping the way language is used
- Jacques Roubaud, a poet and professor of mathematics, wrote sonnets that were mathematically structured
- Erasure poets, such as Ronald Johnson and Jen Bervin, who are constrained by existing poetry or works in which they create new poetry through erasure techniques. One of the most famous examples of erasure work belongs to British artist Tom Phillips, who created A Humument by erasing, through painting and collage, passages from W.H. Mallock's work A Human Document (1892) to create an entirely new character and narrative whilst limited only to using what was in the original narrative and what letters were already there
- Christian Bök (b. 1966) is a Canadian poet and essayist celebrated for his highly experimental, constraint-based approach to language. His best-known work Eunoia (2001) embodies this method: it comprises five chapters each written as a univocalic lipogram (the first using only “a”, the second only “e”, etc.). The book won the 2002 Griffin Poetry Prize and exemplifies Bök’s systematized poetic practice. In writing Eunoia, for example, he exhaustively compiled vocabularies of univocalic words and minimized repetition to meet the constraints. Bök describes this process as a “Sisyphean spectacle” that proves language can still express “uncanny” or “sublime” ideas even under severe formal duress. His work is often linked to the French Oulipo tradition, as he openly acknowledges Oulipian inspiration for Eunoia and more broadly pushes the boundaries of language through mathematical and procedural devices
- Raymond Queneau (1903–1976) was a pioneering French novelist, poet and co-founder of the Ouvroir de Littérature Potentielle (Oulipo) in 1960. He pioneered combinatorial techniques in literature: for example, his Exercises in Style (1947) takes a simple anecdote and retells it in 99 dramatically different stylistic versions. Similarly, Cent mille milliards de poèmes (1961) is a “flipbook” of ten sonnets whose lines can be interchanged to create 10^14 possible poems. These playful permutations of form demonstrated how strict constraints – such as fixed syntax or recombining lines – could generate an enormous variety of meaningful texts. Queneau’s experiments laid the groundwork for Oulipo’s combinatory literature, illustrating the creative potential of self-imposed formal rules
- Georges Perec (1936–1982) was a French novelist and member of Oulipo (he joined the group in 1967) who became renowned for writing under extreme formal constraints. His 1969 novel La Disparition (translated as A Void) famously omits the letter “e” throughout – a lipogrammatic feat so seamless that early readers did not even notice the missing character. Perec also embraced exhaustive constraints: for instance, he remarked that his ambition in the intricate novel Life: A User’s Manual (1978) was “to exhaust… a constituted fragment of the world”. In works like these – along with numerous constrained poems and puzzles – Perec used lipograms, permutations (such as N+7 substitutions), and other rules-based techniques. His playful but rigorous approach made him a central figure in modern combinatory and experimental literature, showing how inventive structures can emerge from seemingly impossible restrictions
