= Allusions to Poe's "The Raven" =

Edgar Allan Poe's poem in popular culture

Edgar Allan Poe's poem "The Raven" has been frequently referenced and parodied in contemporary culture. Immediately popular after the poem's publication in 1845, it quickly became a cultural phenomenon. Some consider it the best poem ever written. As such, modern references to the poem continue to appear in popular culture.

== Print ==
- Writer James Russell Lowell, a contemporary of Poe's, references "The Raven" and its author in his poem, A Fable for Critics: "Here comes Poe with his Raven, like Barnaby Rudge, / Three fifths of him genius, two fifths sheer fudge." This mention alludes to the belief that Barnaby Rudge: A Tale of the Riots of 'Eighty inspired Poe to write "The Raven".
- In Edmund Clerihew Bentley's Trent's Own Case (1913), Trent, standing at an open French door and reciting the fifth stanza to himself, receives an unexpected reply:

"Deep into that darkness peering, long I stood there wondering, fearing,
Doubting, dreaming dreams no mortals ever dared to dream before;
But the silence was unbroken, and the stillness gave no token,
And the only word there spoken was the whispered word, ..."

"Guv'nor!"

Will Elder's absurd illustrations of "The Raven", from Mad Magazine #9, March 1954.

- In Mad magazine's ninth issue (March 1954), "The Raven" is reprinted in full with absurd illustrations by Will Elder. Another parody appeared in a Mad collection, We're Still Using That Greasy MAD Stuff (1959). It was titled as "The Spaniel." Rather than "Nevermore," the author was bombarded with famous commercial taglines. A more recent parody in Mad by Frank Jacobs, titled "The Reagan", appeared in issue 265 (September 1986). Even more recently, the poem was used to parody horror movies, and how successful ones often have sequels made that are of low quality. The recurring line is, "Quoth Wes Craven, let's make more!"
- In the Donald Duck 10-pager "Raven Mad" by Carl Barks, published in Walt Disney's Comics and Stories #265 in 1962, Huey, Dewey and Louie play with a raven who can only say "Nevermore." As in the poem, the raven often repeats the word throughout the story.
- Sections of "The Raven" are quoted in Hubert Selby Jr's 1964 novel Last Exit to Brooklyn. In the story entitled "The Queen is Dead" the lead character, Georgette, reads the poem aloud to her acquaintances.
- "The Raven" has been the subject of constrained writing. Georges Perec's novel A Void (1969), written entirely without the letter 'E' in French and subsequently translated into English by Gilbert Adair under the same constraint, contains a full-length "translation" of "The Raven" entitled "Black Bird." It is attributed to "Arthur Gordon Pym."
- Mathematician Mike Keith has referenced the poem in three examples of constrained writing:
  - "Near a Raven" is a reworking of Poe's poem in which the length of words correspond to the first 740 digits of pi (1995)
  - Cadaeic Cadenza, a longer work under the same constraint, begins with the full text of "Near a Raven" (1996)
  - "Raven-Two", a poetic anagram of the original (1999)
- In Joan Aiken's novel Arabel's Raven (1972), as well as further books from the Arabel and Mortimer series, a young girl named Arabel has a pet raven named Mortimer who often says the word "Nevermore!" Aiken won an Edgar Award in 1972.
- The Calvin and Hobbes collection "The Essential Calvin and Hobbes: A Calvin and Hobbes Treasury" (released September 1988) contains an original illustrated poem, "A Nauseous Nocturne," which is clearly patterned after "The Raven."
- In Stephen King's novel Insomnia (1994), Ralph compares an omen to the raven of the poem. The novel Black House (2001), written by King and Peter Straub, also features a talking crow reminiscent of the raven in Poe's poem. Part III of the novel is entitled "Night's Plutonian Shore."
- In Robin Jarvis's Tales from the Wyrd Museum trilogy (1995–1998), Woden has two raven servants named Thought and Memory. Memory is known as Quoth throughout the stories, and occasionally says "Nevermore".
- Drew Hayes's illustrated poem The Crow, is an adaptation of "The Raven", telling the story of the separation of the main character of the comic book Poison Elves, Lusiphur, and his wife, the sorceress Hyena'. B&W version in Mythography #1, an anthology book also featuring work from other independent comics creators, Bardic Press, 1996. Color version in Poison Elves Color Special, Sirius Entertainment, December 1998
- "The Raven", the fourth story in the anthropomorphic comic book Mouse Guard: Legends of the Guard, volume 1, issue 3 (2010), is an adaptation of Poe's poem with art by Jason Shawn Alexander.
- In the seventh book of Lemony Snicket's A Series of Unfortunate Events, The Vile Village (2001), a tree in the center of the village covered with crows is called the "Nevermore Tree."
- Neil Gaiman references "The Raven" in two of his works:
  - In the novel American Gods (2001), the protagonist, Shadow, asks one of Odin's ravens, "Hey, Hugin or Munin, or whoever you are. Say 'Nevermore.'" The raven responds, "Fuck you."
  - The comic book series The Sandman features Matthew Cable, who has been transformed into a raven as an alternative to death. At one point in the series, he flaps his wings and screams, "Nevermore!", only to explain that he was "being Peter Lorre in that one Roger Corman movie".
- Level Ground Press and artist Bill Fountain published an illustrated re-imagining of "The Raven" in 2005. The book incorporates raven myths and legends from around the world into the visual interpretation of the story.
- Holly Black quotes the poem in her 2005 novel Valiant: A Modern Tale of Faerie, alluding to it as the source for the name of the drug called 'Nevermore'. However, this is later contradicted, when one of the characters asserts that the name comes from the limitations of its use: "Never more than once a day, never more than a pinch at a time, and never more than two days in a row."
- The fantasy novel The Eyre Affair by Jasper Fforde features a villainous character named Jack Schitt who is ultimately trapped inside a copy of "The Raven".
- The first of the books based on the TV series Supernatural is called Nevermore. Poe is also very important for the rest of the book, as the murders that the main characters, Sam and Dean Winchester are investigating are reenactments of "The Murders in the Rue Morgue", "The Cask of Amontillado" and "The Tell-Tale Heart", respectively, and it turns out to be part of a ritual to bring Poe back to life.
- Terry Pratchett's Discworld series contains a talking raven named Quoth, named by a wizard who "thought he was funny." Quoth's first injunction to new acquaintances is that he "won't say the N-word."
- James Patterson's and Chris Tebbet's Middle School: Get Me Out of Here! has a Raven on the cover atop a building screaming "Nevermore!"
- In Suzanne Collins' Hunger Games novel, Sunrise on the Reaping, the poem is mentioned multiple times concerning the character of Lenore Dove Baird. This includes numerous excerpts of the poem being remembered by the lead character, Haymitch Abernathy, as he thinks about his girlfriend Lenore Dove, and comes to realize his own life is a mirror of the poem.

== Film ==
- "The Raven" was recreated as a hallucination of Poe's in the silent film The Raven (1915). A fictionalized biography, it starred Henry B. Walthall as Poe.
- The film The Raven (1935) has Bela Lugosi as a Poe-obsessed doctor and co-stars Boris Karloff. The film has an interpretive dance of "The Raven".
- In 1942, Fleischer Studios created A Cartoon Travesty of The Raven. A two-reel Technicolor cartoon based upon "The Raven" which turned the story of the poem into a lighthearted comedy.
- A Bugs Bunny cartoon, No Parking Hare, has Bugs reading a few lines from the poem, starting with the words, "While I nodded nearly napping". The comic he reads them from is stated as "Poe's Kiddie Comics".
- In 1963, Roger Corman directed The Raven, a comedy with Karloff and Vincent Price, very loosely based on the poem.
- In the stop-motion film Mad Monster Party? (1967), Baron von Frankenstein tests his new potion on a raven, and lets it fly until it lands on a tree branch. Watching the resulting explosion, he says with a chuckle, "Quoth the raven... nevermore. Ah, I've done it – created the means to destroy matter!"
- The stop-motion short film Vincent (1982), by Tim Burton, features a protagonist named Vincent Malloy, whose "favorite author is Edgar Allan Poe." As Vincent lies, seemingly dying, at the end of the film, he quotes the final couplet of "The Raven".
- In the thriller film The Dead Zone (1983), schoolteacher Johnny Smith quotes "The Raven" to his class during a lesson.
- In the comedy film Short Circuit (1986), the robot Number 5 makes the comment "nevermore" in reference to a pet raven of Stephanie Speck's.
- In Batman (1989), the Joker quotes "The Raven" to Vicky Vale when he says, "Take thy beak from out my heart."
- In the film The Crow (1994), Eric references "The Raven" after breaking down the door to Gideon's pawn shop: "'Suddenly, I heard a tapping, as of someone gently rapping, rapping at my chamber door.' You heard me rapping, right?"
- In The Pagemaster (1994), when Richard Tyler and his books enter Dr. Jekyll's mansion and the door closes behind them, a raven flies down past them and says "Nevermore".
- Hannes Rall directed an animated, German-language version of The Raven (Der Rabe) in 1998.
- In Dr. Dolittle 2 (2001), starring Eddie Murphy, when Dolittle holds a meeting with all the animals about how Archie the bear can help save their forest, most of the animals walk away because Archie seems like an idiot who won't be of much help. An irritated raven flies away saying "Nevermore".
- The film Nightmares from the Mind of Poe (2006) adapts "The Raven" along with three Poe short stories: "The Tell-Tale Heart", "The Cask of Amontillado" and "The Premature Burial".
- In the film The Crow: Wicked Prayer (2005), the third sequel to The Crow, during the final battle between Jimmy and Luc, Jimmy tauntingly shouts "Quoth the raven nevermore, motherfucker!"
- In The Expendables (2010), numerous references are made to ravens and, obliquely, to "The Raven". Sylvester Stallone's character is in the process of getting a tattoo completed which features a raven, and the seaplane which his team travels in also features an oversize picture of a raven.
- A film entitled The Raven, which stars John Cusack as a fictionalized Poe, was released in March 2012.

== Television ==
The Simpsons version of "The Raven" (third segment of the first Treehouse of Horror special): Homer cries out "Be that word our sign of parting."

- The Simpsons episode "Treehouse of Horror" uses the poem in its third segment as Lisa reads the story to Bart and Maggie. In the animated segment, Homer serves as the protagonist, Bart takes the raven's form, Marge appears in a painting as Lenore and Lisa and Maggie are angels. Bart complains that the poem is not scary, and, at one point, the Raven says his catchphrase "Eat my shorts" instead of "Nevermore." Homer provides the spoken dialogue for the narrator, while James Earl Jones voices his thoughts. Much of the story is cut for time for this segment. This version of the story culminates with Homer chasing the Bart-Raven around the study. Poe and "The Raven" are referenced in the episode "Saturdays of Thunder", when Nick Riviera appears in an infomercial promoting a cleaning product that will clean dirty gravestones. Troy McClure responds to Riviera with: "Quoth the raven, 'What a shine'."
- Night Gallery, hosted by Rod Serling, featured a brief, humorous story entitled "Quoth the Raven". It featured Poe, portrayed by Marty Allen, being constantly maligned by a talking raven (an uncredited Mel Blanc) on a bust of Pallas as Poe is trying to write the original "Raven" poem.
- Garfield and Friends parodied the poem in the form of a U.S. Acres short titled "Stark Raven Mad", in which Orson narrates, to the tune of the poem, guarding the harvest against Roy's attempts to steal it.
- The Histeria! episode "Super Writers" featured a sketch in which a Peter Lorre-esque Poe attempts to pitch his poem to Sammy Melman, who wants a brighter poem with a happy narrator and a bunny instead of a raven. This frustrates Poe to no end and eventually drives him to publish the poem independently. Later in the episode, in a sketch featuring Poe as a villain, the raven serves as his sidekick.
- Tiny Toon Adventures parodies the poem, with Sweetie Pie playing the role of the Raven while Vincent Price performs the narration voice-over.
- The Pinky, Elmyra & the Brain episode "The Ravin!" parodies the poem, with the Brain narrating and Elmyra using a phrase repetitively.
- In the TV show The Addams Family, Morticia uses "The Raven" as a bed-time story to her son Pugsley, reciting it as a nursery rhyme.
- The 1960s sitcom The Munsters featured a cuckoo clock with a wise-cracking raven (who had named himself "Charlie") instead of a cuckoo, which would emerge and say, "Nevermore, Nevermore" – usually as a comic foil for Herman Munster.
- The animated series Beetlejuice fourth season episode "Poe Pourri" featured Poe as one of the eccentric residents of the Neitherworld who comes to Beetlejuice's Roadhouse searching for his lost Lenore, and with him comes a talking raven who does his verse rapper-style.
- The Teen Titans episode "Nevermore" is centered on Raven and her conflict with her demonic father Trigon.
- In the Gilmore Girls episode, "A Tale of Poes and Fire", "The Raven" is recited by two men dressed like Edgar Allan Poe for a Poe convention.
- In a fourth season episode of Alton Brown's Good Eats ("Fry Hard II: The Chicken"), Brown's prologue shows him rummaging through his cookbooks ("forgotten lore") looking for chicken recipes accompanied by a voice-over of him reciting a parody of the first few stanzas of the poem, during which a plastic chicken, taking the raven's place, perched on the bust of Julia Child and repeatedly says "Fry some more".
- The DuckTales character Poe De Spell is a raven who often says "nevermore".
- The Muppet Babies episode "Quoth the Weirdo" is featured around poetry. Gonzo found much appeal in the spooky atmosphere of "The Raven".
- The Gothic animated series Ruby Gloom based on the apparel franchise of the same name features three ravens named Edgar, Allan and Poe, with Poe being the most prominent.
- In one episode of "Bullwinkle's Corner" from The Bullwinkle Show, the poem parodied is "The Raven". The bird which comes into Bullwinkle's "chamber spooky" is a woodpecker instead of the expected raven. Bullwinkle pursues the imposter bird with a fireplace poker and ends up hitting himself on the head. The narration concludes "Now the room is round me wavin'/ feels like I've been in a cave-in/ When will next I read "The Raven"?/I can tell you...nevermore!"
- In the 11th episode (called "Nevermore") of television series Warehouse 13, many Poe poems feature, including "The Tell-Tale Heart" and, of course, "The Raven".
- In the Star Trek episode "Charlie X", a youth with strange powers forces Spock to recite the first verse of "The Raven", after he had moments previously recited the first verse of "The Tyger".
- In The Following the message "Neverwhere" is found in multiple murder scenes and the murders are strongly connected to Poe's work. Additionally, Joe Carroll, the series' primary antagonist and an admirer of Poe, says "Quoth the raven... Nevermore." as his last words, just prior to his execution by lethal injection.
- On Mama's Family, the local high school was named for Edgar Allan Poe (Edgar Allan Poe High School), with their team nickname being the Ravens. In an early episode, Vint and Naomi recall their days at EAPHS by singing the school fight song: "GO! GO! GO! EDGAR ALLAN POE! We will leave'em weak and weary, we will give'em midnight dreary, will they ever top our score? Quoth the raven, NEVERMORE!".
- The sixth season of Teen Wolf references it on multiple occasions. The first time shows ravens flying alongside the Wild Hunt in a painting, symbolizing the Wild Hunt's ability to steal souls and take them into the state between life and death. The poem is more obviously referenced in the episode "Ghosted", with a character named Lenore who refuses to let go of her own past, hallucinating much like the narrator in the poem, bemoaning the loss of someone she loved.
- In the third season episode of The 100, "Fallen", Raven Reyes recites stanza 85–90 in an attempt of sensory overload to block A.L.I.E. from her brain. Also in season 3 is an episode titled "Nevermore", in which Raven succeeds in removing A.L.I.E. from her brain.
- In Altered Carbon, the AI proprietor of The Raven Hotel is called Poe, whose appearance is similar to Edgar Allan Poe. In the second series, Poe manages The Nevermore Hotel. In the original Altered Carbon novel on which season 1 of the television series is based, the hotel is called The Hendrix and is themed after rock musician Jimi Hendrix, with the AI taking Hendrix's form. When the television series was made, the producers were forced to swap the Jimi Hendrix themes with Edgar Allan Poe ones because Hendrix's estate refuses to license his image in anything they consider violent.
- In the Young Justice episode "Nevermore", when Black Lightning hacks in to the Light's base of operations with Cyborg's help and finds Lex Luthor, he says "While I nodded, nearly napping, suddenly there came a tapping."
- In Rapunzel's Tangled Adventure in the episode "Destinies Collide," after being attacked by a group of ravens, the character Lance remarks "Nevermore."
- The final episode of The Fall of the House of Usher is titled "The Raven". Roderick Usher recites a portion of the poem while he recounts the death of his granddaughter Lenore, who is killed by a character who takes the form of a raven. Ravens appear throughout the series, which is loosely based on multiple Poe works.
- In the fourth season episode of Solar Opposites, "The Super Gooblers," the Pupa haunts a wealthy woman in a manner similar to Poe's Raven. As the woman laments her loneliness stemming from her toxic behavior, the Pupa repeats the word "Cocomelon" until the woman has a breakthrough and resolves to be a better person.
- "Vincent Price's Halloween Special," a 2010 Saturday Night Live sketch, features Vincent Price (played by Bill Hader attempting to read the poem with musical accompaniment by Liberace (played by Fred Armisen), but gives up after Liberace's music repeatedly drifts from scary to upbeat.

== Music ==
Classical and contemporary music

- The symphonic poem The Raven by Joseph Holbrooke (1900).
- Jean Sibelius based an early conception of his fourth symphony on "The Raven."
- In 1971, American conductor and composer Leonard Slatkin set "The Raven" to music for narrator and orchestra.
- In 1995, Austrian composer Paul Kont composed "The Raven" for string orchestra, piano, pre-recorded tape and narrator. It was also released as a score for the short film "The Raven" by Kurt Steinwendner.
- From 2011 to 2012, Japanese composer Toshio Hosokawa composed a monodrama for mezzo-soprano and an ensemble of 12 players.
- In 2018, American composer/violinist Edward W. Hardy composed a solo violin piece called "Nevermore" which was inspired by The Raven.

Pop music

- The psychedelic band The Glass Prism released an album in 1969 entitled Poe Through the Glass Prism, with the lyrics coming entirely from various poems by Poe. "The Raven" was the single from the album.
- The band Kennelmus released the song "The Raven" on their 1971 album Folkstone Prism with lyrics derived from the poem.
- The Alan Parsons Project album Tales of Mystery and Imagination (1976) includes a song based on "The Raven" and entitled the same, but with only two verses.
- A musical variation of "The Raven" was performed by the Grateful Dead during Space on April 19, 1982.
- The black metal band Carpathian Forest used the first two verses of the poem for "The Eclipse / The Raven" on their EP Through Chasm, Caves and Titan Woods (1995).
- The gothic metal band Tristania released a track titled "My Lost Lenore" on Widow's Weeds (1998). It is clearly inspired by this poem, but does not incorporate the poem as part of the lyrics. The entire album is in fact reminiscent of "The Raven". "The Ravens" is another song inspired by the poem, although its main theme is terrorism.
- The German black metal band Agathodaimon quotes "The Raven" in the song "Les Posédes" on their 1999 album Higher Art of Rebellion.
- A song based on "The Raven" appears on the Grave Digger album The Grave Digger (2001), alongside other songs based on the work of Edgar Allan Poe.
- Blues Traveler's 1995 hit "Run-Around" opens with an allusion to the opening line of "The Raven": "Once upon a midnight dreary".
- Lou Reed's 2003 album The Raven is based on Poe's work, including his own version of The Raven in a song by the same name.
- The song "Kremlin Dusk", from Japanese American pop star Hikaru Utada's English-language album Exodus (2004), begins "All along, I was searching for my Lenore/In the words of Mr. Edgar Allan Poe/Now I'm sober and "Nevermore"/Will the Raven come to bother me at home." It also refers to the "dying ember" line in the poem.
- Seattle, Washington metal band Nevermore got its name from the repeated refrain in "The Raven". The band also referenced it in the title track from their 2005 album This Godless Endeavor.
- The Dutch neoceltic pagan folk band Omnia put a slightly edited version of the poem to music as the second track on their 2007 album Alive!.
- The American gothic horror band Nox Arcana released a CD entitled Shadow of the Raven in 2007. Three songs – "Midnight Dreary", "The Raven" and "Nevermore" – as well as the album's title, are direct references to the poem.
- The German symphonic metal band Xandria included the quote "Thus spoke the raven, 'Nevermore'" in their song "Ravenheart", which is inspired by the poem as well.
- The Christian third-wave ska band Five Iron Frenzy quotes many of Poe's lines in "That's How The Story Ends", from The End Is Near, and alludes ironically to the mysterious and somber mood of "The Raven".
- The song "Campanas en la Noche" ("Bells in the Night") by the Argentine rock band Los Tipitos, the tale of a man wishing for the return of his lover, is loosely based on the poem. This relationship is even more evident in the song's video, which features the bust of Pallas and the titular raven itself.
- Rapper MC Lars released the track "Mr. Raven" on The Laptop EP, quoting some lines directly from the poem and modifying others (e.g. "Once upon a midnight dreary, while I kicked it weak and weary").
- The Canadian artist Nash the Slash included an instrumental track called "Lost Lenore" on his vinyl album The Million Year Picnic.
- The Devil Wears Prada used a track of a man reading a part of "The Raven" as a part of an introduction to concerts during a 2008 tour with Underoath. The piece led into the ending breakdown in the song "Goats on a Boat".
- The Dutch based hardstyle artist DJ Pavo released a track entitled "Raven", which quotes various lines from the poem.
- Buddy Morrow and His Orchestra recorded an album of songs based on Poe's works. The album, Poe for Moderns, includes a condensed, jazzy version of "The Raven".
- The hip hop group Cyne included a track called "The Raven" on their 2009 album Water for Mars. The group paraphrases Poe's famous line in a few cynical lines (e.g. "Nevermore said the raven, goodbye to innocence").
- Recording artist Natalia Kills released a Halloween inspired, abridged reading of the poem with backing from Space Cowboy for 2009. She then released a version with the full poem for 2010, with no backing from Space Cowboy or vocal effects, instead, there were sound effects to reflect the poem.
- Swiss folk metal band Eluveitie released a track titled "Quoth the Raven" on their 2010 release Everything Remains (As It Never Was) portraying the Raven as the harbinger of death.
- The Darren Criss song "High School Rock Out" made a reference to "The Raven" with the line "And you think he might be waiting but behind him is your raven singing 'Nevermore' I'm laying him down".
- The Band known as "Circus Contraption" had the lyric "Nevermore the raven said and then he fell upon his head the poor bird lost his balance in flight" in their song "We Are All Mad".
- In his song "Now Is Now", Reverend Flash uses the line "Vainly, I had sought to borrow" in a verse which ironically addresses purported plagiarism in the song itself.
- Spoken at the end video for the Thirty Seconds to Mars song "Hurricane" are the lines "Deep into that darkness peering, long I stood there wondering, fearing, doubting, dreaming dreams no mortal ever dared to dream before".
- In 2013, English musician Steven Wilson released The Raven That Refused to Sing (And Other Stories), featuring songs based on Edgar Allan Poe's works, with the title track "The Raven That Refused to Sing" based directly off the poem.
- In 2014, the Oregon Crusaders Drum and Bugle Corps performed their program entitled "Nevermore", using selected stanzas from the original poem and using musical selections by Zack Hemsey, Kevin Walczyk, Paul Bissell, Vienna Teng and Samuel Barber.
- The Greek Black Metal band Rotting Christ released a track titled "The Raven" on their 2019 album The Heretics. The song's lyrics feature excerpts from the poem.
- Russian Goth Rock band "Raven Said", whose name and oeuvre are inspired by this and other works of Edgar Allan Poe.
- Country singer Stonewall Jackson (musician) released ""Never More" Quote [sic] The Raven", a song about a lost love, in 1969.
- In 2021, the artists sasakure.UK and lasah collaborated under the name sasalasa, released the single "nevermore" in which the title and lyrics are influenced by the poem.

== Video games ==
- In the interactive fiction game by Infocom, A Mind Forever Voyaging, Part II begins with a line from the poem: "Deep into that darkness peering, long I stood there wondering, fearing, / Doubting, dreaming dreams no mortal ever dared to dream before..."
- The video game Eternal Darkness for the GameCube opens with a quote from "The Raven": "Deep into that darkness peering/Long I stood there wondering, fearing, doubting..." A large theme of the game is the characters' slowly collapsing sanity. It sets up the game's "sanity meter" mechanic where things in the game make less and less sense as the characters' sanity depletes: walls start to bleed, screams are heard. Sometimes, the game will make the player think that it has reset, and will show them the quote again, appearing to show that they have lost all of their progress, only for the screen to flash and put them right back where they were as if nothing happened.
- In another PC game, Nancy Drew: Ransom of the Seven Ships, if you find pieces of paper in the bottles while sailing, they will be automatically pieced together to form a passage from "The Raven", the one just before the raven appears. Certain letters in red will tell you to go to and dive to one of the sunken ships where the sharks are, and, using the metal detector from Johnny Rolle, you will find an Easter egg. This is also a reference of the next game, Warnings at Waverly Academy, as Corine mentions that she is a Poe fan, as well as Leela having the missing Poe book, "The Black Cat and Other Stories", which includes "The Raven" and other works, as well as the pendulum challenge, a reference of "The Pit and The Pendulum, which is also in Leela's book.
- In the video game mod Defense of the Ancients, a hero is named Nevermore, after the word the raven sequentially spoke. Nevermore the Shadow Fiend is a demon who collects and traps the souls of his enemies and his ultimate ability Requiem of Souls, releases the souls collected into an area to damage his enemies in a line. In the stand-alone sequel Dota 2, his description is reminiscent of the poem; his background story says Nevermore has the soul of a poet, as well as warriors, criminals, slaves, and priests.
- In the game League of Legends, the champion Swain has a spell called Nevermove which immobilizes his enemies.
- In the 2016 video game Overwatch, the hero/playable character Reaper has two skins available that directly reference "The Raven". The skins feature bird-head shaped masks and are titled Plague Doctor and Nevermore, the latter referencing the poem's refrain, "Quoth the raven, Nevermore.", and the former being a recolor of Nevermore.
- In the Collector's Edition of the episodic video game The Last Door, itself heavily influenced by Poe and Lovecraft, there is an easter egg in the 4th episode of season one – "Ancient Shadows", where a raven can be triggered to utter the phrase, "Nevermore".
- In the video game Fallout 4, Nick Valentine will quote "Deep into that darkness peering, long I stood there wondering, fearing..." towards the end of the quest 'Reunions' as you exit Fort Hagen.
- In the video game Fortnite Battle Royale, players are able to purchase the cosmetic item titled "Raven" with the description listing it as part of the "Nevermore Set", referencing the Raven's quote.
- The video game Baldur's Gate 3 features two different spells that can summon a magical raven to aid the player’s characters. In both cases, the raven is named "Quothe". (This is likely also a reference to the Discworld character Quoth the Raven.)
- In the video game Terraria, the Raven is an enemy found in Graveyards, which are spawned in places with at least 5 gravestones. Its entry in the game's bestiary simply says "Nevermore" eight times.
- In the video game Honkai: Star Rail, "Quoth the Raven" and "Nevermore" are two soundtracks that are played in some of the missions. The readable object "Death of the Crow" contains an adapted version of "The Raven".

== Other ==
An 1890 political cartoon from Puck Magazine depicts The Raven as Secretary of State James G. Blaine watching President Benjamin Harrison.

- Lord Buckley recorded a "hipsemantic" version of "The Raven" in 1956 ("It was a real drugged midnight... dreary.").
- Computer scientist Guy L. Steele, Jr. wrote a parody entitled "The HACTRN" about a hacker haunted by a phantom process.
- The Raven Society, founded in 1904, is the University of Virginia's most prestigious honor society, combining requirements of high-level scholarship, service, leadership, and "promise of further advancement in the intellectual field." New members must supply a parody of the poem for initiation, which takes place in the room where Poe lived when studying at the university, now under the curatorship of the Society. The Society also maintains several other Poe sites, including the grave marker of his mother Eliza Poe in Richmond, Virginia.
- Professional wrestler Scott Levy has used the ring name Raven from the title of the poem since he joined ECW, and often quotes from the poem in interviews, ending with "...Quoth the Raven...Nevermore..."
- The comic strip Shoe ran a strip in which a large, strange, black bird was sitting at Roz's bar, uttering random words starting with "never-" or ending in "-more" (e.g., "Livermore!"; "Nevertheless!"), when one of the regular characters announced that the raven was bombed.
- Poe lived in Baltimore for a time and is buried there. Residents of the city elected to honor Poe by naming their National Football League team the Baltimore Ravens after the poem. Furthermore, the three mascots for the team are three ravens, appropriately named "Edgar", "Allan" and "Poe." For many years, pre-game introductions of the Ravens' starting lineup would be preceded by a stanza from the poem, usually one which ended with the word "Nevermore," referring to the opposing team's putative inability to score when facing the powerful Raven defense. In 2000, when the Ravens were on their way to winning their first Super Bowl primarily on the strength of that record-setting defense, Chris Berman of ESPN's NFL PrimeTime would often punctuate highlights of the team's results that day by saying, "Quoth the Ravens, Never score!". Another example is the all-haiku 2008 NFL season preview of ESPN.com columnist Gregg Easterbrook (who often calls the team the "Nevermores" in his column), which reads: "Awk! No offense. Awk! / Quoth the raven: "No offense." / Bal-a-mer Ravens".
- RavenCon, an annual science fiction convention in Richmond, Virginia, was named in honor of Poe, who grew up in Richmond.
- The original version of Epcot's Journey Into Imagination included an open book with the shadow of the raven in the "Tales of Terror" sequence.
- Variations using the DOS error message "Abort, Retry, Ignore?" were written in the 1980s and 90s and were quite popular, distributed by bulletin board and email. The original and best known version has been credited to Cleveland poet Marcus Bales. It has been adapted numerous times, attributed to Anonymous, Rob Collins, and others.
- A Penny Arcade comic parodies the poem by making the raven say "Jersey Shore" as a comment on the ad supported Amazon Kindle.
- The webcomic xkcd parodies the poem by playing on the term "rapping", showing the first stanza followed by a picture of popular rapper Eminem
- In the universe of Warhammer 40.000, Corvus Corax, the primarch of the Raven Guard legion of the Space Marines, says "Never more" as his last words before he goes into the Eye of Terror and never returns.
- A style of parody on messageboards involves mimicking the style of the poem to some degree, with the line "quoth the raven 'never more' replaced by "quoth the server, '404'", referencing a commonly seen http error code
- A parody by John A. Carroll about the Viking lander, entitled "What's In Store..." and starting with the line "Once Upon a Planet Dreary", was published in Analog magazine in May 1977.
- In RWBY, one of the Grimm is identified as a Nevermore, a Grimm that bears a strong resemblance to a giant raven with four eyes. Nevermore is also the title of a track from Volume 6.
- Peter Sellers of the website Deeko made a review of Dementium: The Ward in the form/parody of the poem.
- A 2008 episode of The Now Show on BBC Radio 4 featured a parody of the poem called "The Gordon", about Gordon Brown.
- The Raven is a wooden roller coaster at the Holiday World theme park in Santa Claus, Indiana. It was named after the poem 145 years to the day after Poe's death, and opened 150 years after the poem was published.
- The Nevermore Haunt, an historically themed haunted attraction that operates annually in October in Baltimore, MD

== See also ==
- Edgar Allan Poe in popular culture
