= Invisible Cities =

1972 novel by Italo Calvino

- First edition cover featuring The Castle in the Pyrenees
- Author: Italo Calvino
- Original title: Le città invisibili
- Translator: William Weaver
- Cover artist: René Magritte, The Castle in the Pyrenees, 1959
- Language: Italian
- Genre: Postmodern novel Magic realism
- Publisher: Giulio Einaudi
- Publication date: 1972
- Publication place: Italy
- English publication date: 1974
- Media type: Print (hardcover & paperback)
- Pages: 165 pp (first English edition)
- ISBN: 0-15-145290-3 (first English edition)
- OCLC: 914835
- Dewey Decimal: 853/.9/14
- LC Class: PZ3.C13956 In PQ4809.A45

Invisible Cities (Italian: Le città invisibili) is a postmodern novel by the Italian writer Italo Calvino. It was published in Italy in 1972 by Einaudi.

== Description ==
The book is framed as a conversation between the Mongol emperor Kublai Khan, and Marco Polo. The majority of the book consists of brief prose poems describing 55 fictitious cities that are narrated by Polo, many of which can be read as commentary on culture, language, time, memory, death, or human experience generally.

Short dialogues between Kublai and Polo are interspersed every five to ten cities discussing the same topics. These interludes between the two characters are no less poetically constructed than the cities, and form a framing device that plays with the natural complexity of language and stories. In the middle of the book, Kublai asks about a city Polo never mentioned, his hometown of Venice. Polo replies, "Every time I describe a city I am saying something about Venice."

== Historical background ==
Invisible Cities deconstructs an archetypal example of the travel literature genre, The Travels of Marco Polo, which depicts the eponymous Venetian merchant's journey across Asia and in Yuan China (Mongol Empire). The original 13th-century travelogue shares with Calvino's novel the brief, often fantastic accounts of the cities Polo claimed to have visited, along with descriptions of the city's inhabitants, notable imports and exports, and stories by Polo about the region.

Invisible Cities is an example of Calvino's use of combinatory literature, and shows influences of semiotics and structuralism. In the novel, the reader finds himself playing a game with the author, wherein they must find the patterns hidden in the book. The book has nine chapters, but there are also hidden divisions within the book: each of the 55 cities belongs to one of eleven thematic groups (explained below). The reader can therefore play with the book's structure, and choose to follow one group or another, rather than reading the book in chronological chapters. At a 1983 conference held at Columbia University, Calvino himself stated that there is no definite end to Invisible Cities because "this book was made as a polyhedron, and it has conclusions everywhere, written along all of its edges."

== Structure ==
Over the nine chapters, Marco describes a total of fifty-five cities, all women's names. The cities are divided into eleven thematic groups of five each:

1. Cities & Memory
2. Cities & Desire
3. Cities & Signs
4. Thin Cities
5. Trading Cities
6. Cities & Eyes
7. Cities & Names
8. Cities & the Dead
9. Cities & the Sky
10. Continuous Cities
11. Hidden Cities

He moves back and forth between the groups, while moving down the list, in a rigorous mathematical structure. The table below lists the cities in order of appearance, along with the group they belong to:

Chapter no.	Memory	Desire	Signs	Thin	Trading	Eyes	Names	Dead	Sky	Continuous	Hidden
1	Diomira										
1	Isidora										
1		Dorothea									
1	Zaira										
1		Anastasia									
1			Tamara								
1	Zora										
1		Despina									
1			Zirma								
1				Isaura							
2	Maurilia										
2		Fedora									
2			Zoe								
2				Zenobia							
2					Euphemia						
3		Zobeide									
3			Hypatia								
3				Armilla							
3					Chloe						
3						Valdrada					
4			Olivia								
4				Sophronia							
4					Eutropia						
4						Zemrude					
4							Aglaura				
5				Octavia							
5					Ersilia						
5						Baucis					
5							Leandra				
5								Melania			
6					Esmeralda						
6						Phyllis					
6							Pyrrha				
6								Adelma			
6									Eudoxia		
7						Moriana					
7							Clarice				
7								Eusapia			
7									Beersheba		
7										Leonia	
8							Irene				
8								Argia			
8									Thekla		
8										Trude	
8											Olinda
9								Laudomia			
9									Perinthia		
9										Procopia	
9											Raissa
9									Andria		
9										Cecilia	
9											Marozia
9										Penthesilea	
9											Theodora
9											Berenice

In each of the nine chapters, there is an opening section and a closing section, narrating dialogues between the Khan and Marco. The descriptions of the cities lie between these two sections.

The matrix of eleven column themes and fifty-five subchapters (ten rows in chapters 1 and 9, five in all others) shows some interesting properties. Each column has five entries, rows only one, so there are fifty-five cities in all. The matrix of cities has a central element (Baucis). The pattern of cities is symmetric with respect to inversion about that center. Equivalently, it is symmetric against 180 degree rotations about Baucis. Inner chapters (2-8 inclusive) have diagonal cascades of five cities (e.g. Maurila through Euphemia in chapter 2). These five-city cascades are displaced by one theme column to the right as one proceeds to the next chapter. In order that the cascade sequence terminate (the book of cities is not infinite) Calvino, in chapter 9, truncates the diagonal cascades in steps: Laudomia through Raissa is a cascade of four cities, followed by cascades of three, two, and one, necessitating ten cities in the final chapter. The same pattern is used in reverse in chapter 1 as the diagonal cascade of cities is born. This strict adherence to a mathematical pattern is characteristic of the Oulipo literary group to which Calvino belonged.

== Awards ==
The book was nominated for the Nebula Award for Best Novel in 1975.

== Opera ==
Invisible Cities (and in particular the chapters about Isidora, Armilla, and Adelma) is the basis for an opera by composer Christopher Cerrone, first produced by The Industry in October 2013 as an experimental production at Union Station in Los Angeles. In this site-specific production directed by Yuval Sharon, the performers, including eleven musicians, eight singers, and eight dancers, were located in (or moved through) different parts of the train station, while the station remained open and operating as usual. The performance could be heard by about 200 audience members, who wore wireless headphones and were allowed to move through the station at will. An audio recording of the opera was released in November 2014. The opera was named a finalist for the 2014 Pulitzer Prize for Music.

== See also ==
- Roland Barthes
- The Decameron
- Oulipo
- Structuralism
- Surrealism
