= Piphilology =

Mnemonics of pi's digits

Piphilology comprises the creation and use of mnemonic techniques to remember many digits of the mathematical constant π. The word is a play on the word "pi" itself and of the linguistic field of philology.

There are many ways to memorize π, including the use of piems (a portmanteau, formed by combining pi and poem), which are poems that represent π in a way such that the length of each word (in letters) represents a digit. An example of a piem is: "Now I need a drink, alcoholic of course, after the heavy lectures involving quantum mechanics." The first word has three letters, the second word has one, the third has four, the fourth has one, the fifth has five, and so on. In longer examples, 10-letter words are used to represent the digit zero, and this rule is extended to handle repeated digits in so-called Pilish writing. The short story "Cadaeic Cadenza" records the first 3,834 digits of π in this manner, and a 10,000-word novel, Not A Wake, has been written accordingly.

However, poems prove to be inefficient for large memorizations of π. Other methods include remembering patterns in the numbers (for instance, the year 1971 appears in the first fifty digits of π) and the method of loci (which has been used to memorize π to 67,890 digits).

== History ==
Recent decades have seen a surge in the record number of digits memorized.

Until the 20th century, the number of digits of pi which mathematicians had the stamina to calculate by hand remained in the hundreds, so that memorization of all known digits at the time was possible. In 1949 a computer was used to calculate π to 2,000 places, presenting one of the earliest opportunities for a more difficult challenge.

Later computers calculated pi to extraordinary numbers of digits (2.7 trillion as of August 2010), and people began memorizing more and more of the output. The world record for the number of digits memorized has exploded since the mid-1990s, and it stood at 100,000 as of October 2006. The previous record (83,431) was set by the same person (Akira Haraguchi) on July 2, 2005, and the record previous to that (42,195) was held by Hiroyuki Goto. An institution from Germany provides the details of the "Pi World Ranking".

== Examples in English ==
The most common mnemonic technique is to memorize a so-called "piem" (a wordplay on "pi" and "poem") in which the number of letters in each word is equal to the corresponding digit of π. This famous example for 15 digits has several variations, including:

How I want a drink, alcoholic of course, after the heavy chapters involving quantum mechanics! - Sir James Hopwood Jeans

Short mnemonics such as these, of course, do not take one very far down π's infinite road. Instead, they are intended more as amusing doggerel. If even less accuracy suffices, the following examples can be used:

How I wish I could recollect pi easily today!
May I have a large container of coffee, cream and sugar?

This second one gives the value of π as 3.1415926535, while the first only brings it to the second five. Indeed, many published poems use truncation instead of one of the several roundings, thereby producing a less-accurate result when the first omitted digit is greater than or equal to five. It is advantageous to use truncation in memorizing if the individual intends to study more places later on, otherwise one will be remembering erroneous digits.

Another mnemonic is:

The point I said a blind Bulgarian in France could see

In this mnemonic the word "point" represents the decimal point itself.

Yet another example is:

How I wish I could recollect, of circle round, the exact relation Arkimedes (or Archimede) unwound.

In this example, the spelling of Archimedes is normalised to nine. Although 'Archimedes' is, today, a more correct spelling of the ancient Greek mathematician's name in English, Archimede is also often seen when this mnemonic is given, since Archimède is the more correct spelling in some languages, such as French. This mnemonic also contains a rounding error because the digit represented by the last word "Arkimedes" (9) in 3.141592653589 is followed by 7 in π, which would cause the last two digits to round up.

Longer mnemonics employ the same concept. This example created by Peter M. Brigham incorporates twenty decimal digits:

How I wish I could enumerate pi easily, since all these bullshit mnemonics prevent recalling any of pi's sequence more simply.

=== Poems ===
Some mnemonics, such as this poem which gives the three and the first 20 decimal digits, use the separation of the poem's title and main body to represent the decimal point:

Pie
I wish I could determine pi
Eureka, cried the great inventor
Christmas pudding, Christmas pie
Is the problem's very center.

Another, more poetic version is:

Sir, I have a rhyme excelling,
In mystic power and magic spelling,
Celestial spirits elucidate,
For my own problems can't relate.

Extensions to 30 or 31 decimals of the same proceed as follows:

Sir, I send a rhyme excelling, In sacred truth and rigid spelling, Numerical sprites elucidate, For me the lexicon's full weight, If nature gain, who can complain, Tho' Dr Johnson fulminate?	Sir, I bear a rhyme excelling In mystic force and magic spelling Celestial sprites elucidate All my own striving can't relate Or locate they who can cogitate And so finally terminate. Finis.

There are minor variations on the above rhyme, which still allow pi to be worked out correctly. However, one variation replaces the word "lexicon's" with "lesson's" and in doing so, incorrectly indicates that the 18th digit is seven.

The logologist Dmitri Borgmann gives the following 30-word poem in his book, Language on Vacation: An Olio of Orthographical Oddities:

Now, a moon, a lover refulgent in flight,
Sails the black silence's loneliest ellipse.
Computers use pi, the constant, when polite,
Or gentle data for sad tracking aid at eclipse.

In the fantasy book, Somewhen by David Saul, a 35-word piem both provides a description of the constant pi and the digits. The text is also laid out as a circle to provide another clue to the readers as to the purpose of the poem. In this example, the word "nothing" is used to represent the digit zero.

It's a fact
A ratio immutable
Of circle round and width,
Produces geometry's deepest conundrum.
For as the numerals stay random,
No repeat lets out its presence,
Yet it forever stretches forth.
Nothing to eternity.

The following sonnet is a mnemonic for pi to 75 decimal places in iambic pentameter:

Now I defy a tenet gallantly
Of circle canon law: these integers
Importing circles' quotients are, we see,
Unwieldy long series of cockle burs

Put all together, get no clarity;
Mnemonics shan't describeth so reformed
Creating, with a grammercy plainly,
A sonnet liberated yet conformed.

Strangely, the queer'st rules I manipulate
Being followéd, do facilitate
Whimsical musings from geometric bard.

This poesy, unabashed as it's distressed,
Evolvéd coherent - a simple test,
Discov'ring poetry no numerals jarred.

Note that in this example, 10-letter words are used to represent the digit zero.

Other poems use sound as a mnemonic technique, as in the following poem which rhymes with the first 140 decimal places of pi using a blend of assonance, slant rhyme, and perfect rhyme:

dreams number us like pi. runes shift. nights rewind
daytime pleasure-piles. dream-looms create our id.
moods shift. words deviate. needs brew. pleasures rise.
time slows. too late? wait! foreign minds live in

us! quick-minds, free-minds, minds-we-never-mind,
unknown, gyrate! neuro-rhymes measure our
minds, for our minds rhyme. crude ego-emanations
distort nodes. id, (whose basic neuro-spacetime rhymes),

plays its tune. space drones before fate unites
dreams’ lore to unsung measures. whole dimensions
gyrate. new number-games donate quick minds &
weave through fate’s loom. fears, hopes, digits, or devils

collide here—labor stored in gold-mines, lives, lightcone-
piles. fate loops through dreams & pleasure-looms….

Note that "dreams number us like pi" corresponds to "314159", "runes shift" corresponds to "26", "nights rewind" corresponds to "535" and so on. Sound-based mnemonic techniques, unlike pilish, do not require that the letters in each word be counted in order to recall the digits of pi. However, where sound-based mnemonics use assonance, extra care must be taken to distinguish "nine" and "five," which contain the same vowel sound. In this example, the author assumes the convention that zero is often called "O."

=== Piku ===
The piku follows the rules of conventional haiku (three lines of 5, 7 and 5 syllables), but with the added mnemonic trick that each word contains the same number of letters as the numerals of pi, e.g.

How I love a verse
Contrived to unhusk dryly
One image nutshell

=== Songs ===
In 2004, Andrew Huang wrote a song that was a mnemonic for the first fifty digits of pi, titled "I am the first 50 digits of pi". The first line is:

Man, I can’t - I shan’t! - formulate an anthem where the words comprise mnemonics, dreaded mnemonics for pi.

In 2013, Huang extended the song to include the first 100 digits of pi, and changed the title to "Pi Mnemonic Song".

=== Lengthier works ===
There are piphilologists who have written texts that encode hundreds or thousands of digits. This is an example of constrained writing, known as "Pilish". For example, Mike Keith's poem Poe, E.: Near a Raven represents 740 digits, his story Cadaeic Cadenza encodes 3,835, and his book Not A Wake extends to 10,000 digits.

=== Sound-based mnemonics ===
It is also possible to use the rhythm and sound of the spoken digits themselves as a memorization device. The mathematician John Horton Conway composed the following arrangement for the first 100 digits,

                        _     _   _
            3 point  1415  9265  35
                     ^ ^
             _ _  _ _    _ _   __
            8979  3238  4626  4338   3279
              **  **^^          ^^   ****
             .   _    _   __   _    _      _ . _ .
       502 884  197 169  399 375  105 820  974 944
        ^  ^                       ^  ^
                59230 78164
                 _     _    _    _
              0628  6208  998  6280
               ^^   ^^         ^^
             .. _  .._
             34825 34211 70679,
                         ^  ^

where the accents indicate various kinds of repetition.

Another mnemonic system used commonly in the memorization of pi is the Mnemonic major system, where single numbers are translated into basic sounds. A combination of these sounds creates a word, which can then be translated back into numbers. When combined with the Method of loci, this becomes a very powerful memorization tool.

0 1 2 3 4 5 6 7 8 9 -	s, z, soft c d, t, th n m r l j, sh, soft ch, dg, zh, soft g k, hard c, hard g, q, qu v, f b, p vowel sounds, w, h, y (no value)

One particularly long example using the mnemonic major system is the following sentences, used by Arthur T. Benjamin to memorize the first 100 digits:

My turtle Pancho will, my love, pick up my new mover Ginger.
My movie monkey plays in a favorite bucket.
Ship my puppy Michael to Sullivan's backrubber.
A really open music video cheers Jenny F. Jones.
Have a baby fish knife, so Marvin will marinate the goose-chick!

== Examples in other languages ==
=== Albanian ===
Kur i hyej, e kryej, sigurisht, po përtoj andaj nuk fitoj

Translation:

If I start dealing with it, I will do it, but I am lazy therefore I do not win.

=== Armenian ===
(10 decimal places)

Ահա և հեշտ և սիրով սովորեցիր մի պիտանի խրթին թիվ։

Translation:

Here you easily and lovingly learned a useful intricate number.

=== Chinese ===
It is possible to construct piphilogical poems in Chinese by using homophones or near-homophones of the numbers zero through nine, as in the following well known example which covers 22 decimal places of π. In this example the character meaning "mountain" (山 shān) is used to represent the number "three" (三 sān), the character meaning "I" (吾 wú) is used to represent the number "five" (五 wǔ), and the characters meaning "temple" (寺 sì) and "die" (死 sǐ) are used to represent the number "four" (四 sì). Some of the mnemonic characters used in this poem, for example "kill" (殺 shā) for "three" (三 sān), "jug" (壺 hú) for "five" (五 wǔ), "happiness" (樂 lè) for "six" (六 liù) and "eat" (吃 chī) for "seven" (七 qī), are not very close phonetically in Mandarin/Putonghua.

山	巔	一	寺	一	壺	酒
shān	diān	yī	sì	yī	hú	jiǔ
3	.	1	4	1	5	9
爾	樂	苦	煞	吾
ěr	lè	kǔ	shā	wú
2	6	5	3	5
把	酒	吃		酒	殺	爾
bǎ	jiǔ	chī		jiǔ	shā	ěr
8	9	7		9	3	2
殺	不	死		樂	爾	樂
shā	bù	sǐ		lè	ěr	lè
3	8	4		6	2	6

This can be translated as:

On a mountain top a temple and a jug of wine.
Your happiness makes me so bitter;
Take some wine and drink, the wine will kill you;
If it does not kill you, I will rejoice in your happiness.

=== Czech ===
(nine decimal places)

Sám u sebe v hlavě magického pí číslic deset mám.

Translation:

I have ten digits of magical pi in my head.

(12 decimal places)

Lín a kapr u hráze prohlídli si rybáře, udici měl novou, jikrnáči neuplovou.

Translation:

Tench and carp by the dam watched the fisher. He has a new rod, fish will not escape.

(13 decimal places)

Dej, ó Bože, a číslo Ludolfovo já navždy pomnu, pro větší naplnění moudrosti početní.

Translation:

Oh God, let me to remember the pi forever, for the increase of mathematical skills.

(30 decimal places)

Mám ó bože ó velký pamatovat si takový cifer řad, velký slovutný Archimedes, pomáhej trápenému, dej mu moc, nazpaměť nechť odříká ty slavné sice, ale tak protivné nám, ach, číslice Ludolfovy!

Translation:

Shall I, God oh almighty, remember such a long string of numbers, great and famous Archimedes, help my careworn being, give me the power, to recite by heart all the digits, which may be famous, but also hated by some of us, the digits of Ludolph van Ceulen.

=== French ===
The following poem composed of alexandrines consists of words each with a number of letters that yields π to 126 decimal places:

Que j’aime à faire apprendre un nombre utile aux sages !
Immortel Archimède, artiste ingénieur,
Qui de ton jugement peut priser la valeur ?
Pour moi, ton problème eut de pareils avantages.
Jadis, mystérieux, un problème bloquait
Tout l’admirable procédé, l’œuvre grandiose
Que Pythagore découvrit aux anciens Grecs.
Ô quadrature ! vieux tourment du philosophe !
Insoluble rondeur, trop longtemps vous avez
Défié Pythagore et ses imitateurs.
Comment intégrer l’espace plan circulaire ?
Former un triangle auquel il équivaudra ?
Nouvelle invention : Archimède inscrira
Dedans un hexagone; appréciera son aire,
Fonction du rayon. Pas trop ne s’y tiendra :
Dédoublera chaque élément antérieur;
Toujours de l’orbe calculée approchera;
Définira limite; enfin, l’arc, le limiteur
De cet inquiétant cercle, ennemi trop rebelle !
Professeur, enseignez son problème avec zèle !

Translation:

How I like to teach this number useful to the wise.
Immortal Archimedes, artist, engineer,
in your opinion who could estimate its value?
For me, your problem had equal advantages.
Long ago, mysterious, a problem blocked
All the admirable process, the great work
That Pythagoras revealed to the Ancient Greeks.
Oh quadrature! Old philosopher's torment
Unsolvable roundness, for too long you have
Defied Pythagoras and his imitators.
How to integrate the plain circular space?
Form a triangle to which it is equivalent?
New invention: Archimedes will inscribe
Inside a hexagon; will appreciate its area
Function of a ray. Not too much to hold onto there:
Will split each previous element;
Always the calculated orb will approach
Will define the limit; finally, the arc, the limiter
Of this disturbing circle, an enemy too rebellious
Teacher, teach its problem with zeal

An alternative beginning:

Que j’aime à faire apprendre un nombre utile aux sages !
Glorieux Archimède, artiste ingénieur,
Toi de qui Syracuse aime encore la gloire,
Soit ton nom conservé par de savants grimoires !
...

=== German ===
This statement yields π to twenty-two decimal places:

Wie, o dies π macht ernstlich so vielen viele Müh. Lernt immerhin, Mägdelein, leichte Verselein, wie so zum Beispiel dies dürfte zu merken sein.

English translation that does not encode pi:

How, oh this π seriously makes so many struggles to so many. Learn at least, girls, simple little verses, just such as this one should be memorizable.

Looser English translation that encodes pi:

Woe! O this π makes seriously so muchly many's woe.

=== Hungarian ===
Nem a régi s durva közelítés,
Mi szótól szóig így kijön
Betűiket számlálva.
Ludolph eredménye már,
Ha itt végezzük húsz jegyen.
De rendre kijő még tíz pontosan,
Azt is bízvást ígérhetem.

Translation:

It is not the old and rough approximation,
What comes out word by word
Counting their letters.
Ludolph's result is already here,
If we do it, on twenty digits.
But come out ten more precisely
I also promise definitely.

An interesting (not math themed) alternative:

Bír-e, érez-e ember nyugalmat,
Ha lelkét nehéz bús emlék zaklatja.
Szüntelen felhőbe burkolózó idő az,
Ami változni ámha akarna se tudhat,
Mert azt nem írhattya már le halandó kívánsága.

Translation:

Whether has, whether feels a man a peace of mind
If his soul is harassed by heavy, sad memories.
The continuously clouded time is,
What cannot change although it want,
Because it cannot be written by a mortal's desire.

Another alternative:

Íme a szám: a görög periféria pi betűje.
Euler meg Viète végtelen összeggel közelít értékéhez.
Lám, őt már Egyiptom, Kína, Európa is akarta, hogy
„ama kör kerülete úgy ki lehetne számlálva”.

=== Irish ===
(7 decimal places)

Níl i mata, a shaoi, eolaíocht nó feidhm.

Translation:

Wise one, mathematics has neither science nor use.

=== Italian ===
(30 decimal places)

Non è dato a tutti ricordare il numero aureo del sommo filosofo Archimede. Certuni sostengon che si può ricordar tale numero, ma questi soli poi non recitano che un centone insensato.

Translation:

Not anybody can retain the golden number of the great philosopher Archimedes. There are who claim it is possible to recall this number, but then they just recite a senseless cento.

(10 decimal places)

Chi è nudo e crepa limonando la tubera, lieto lui crepa

Translation:

He who is naked and dies making out with the tuber, dies happy

=== Japanese ===
Japanese piphilology has countless mnemonics based on punning words with numbers. This is especially easy in Japanese because there are two or three ways to pronounce each digit, and the language has relatively few phonemes to begin with. For example, to 31 decimal places:

身	一つ	世	一つ	生	く	に	無	意	味	い	わ	く	な	く	身	ふ	み	や	読	む	似	ろ	よ	さん	ざん	闇		に	な	く
3.	1	4	1	5	9	2	6	5	3	5	8	9	7	9	3	2	3	8	4	6	2	6	4	3	3	8	3	2	7	9
mi	hitotsu	yo	hitotsu	iku		ni	mu-imi			iwakunaku					mi	fumiya			yomu		niro		yo	san	zan	yami		ni	naku

This is close to being ungrammatical nonsense, but a loose translation prioritizing word order yields:

A person is one; the world is one:
to live this way, it's meaningless, one says, and cries,
"step on it, will ya!" then reads—be the same!
Crying uncontrollably in the dark.

Japanese children also use songs built on this principle to memorize the multiplication table.

=== Katharevousa (archaizing) Greek ===
Yielding π to 22 decimal places:

Ἀεὶ ὁ Θεὸς ὀ Μέγας γεωμετρεῖ,
τὸ κύκλου μῆκος ἵνα ὁρίσῃ διαμέτρῳ,
παρήγαγεν ἀριθμὸν ἀπέραντον,
καὶ ὅν, φεῦ, οὐδέποτε ὅλον θνητοὶ θὰ εὕρωσι

Translation:

The Great God applies geometry forever;
To define the length of the circle using its diameter,
He produced an infinite number,
Which, alas, mortals will never find in its entirety.

=== Persian ===
خرد | و | دانش | و | آگاهی | دانشمندان
.ره | سرمنزل | مقصود | بما | آموزد

Translation:

Wisdom, science, and the knowledge of scholars,
will show us the way to the destination.

Counting the letters in each word (additionally separated by "|") gives 10 decimal places of π: خرد (kherad) = 3, و (va) = 1, دانش (daanesh) = 4, و (va) = 1, آگاهی (aagaahi) = 5, ...

=== Polish ===
The verse of Polish mathematician Witold Rybczyński (35 decimal places):

Daj, o pani, o boska Mnemozyno, pi liczbę, którą też zowią ponętnie ludolfiną, pamięci przekazać tak, by jej dowolnie oraz szybko do pomocy użyć, gdy się problemu nie da inaczej rozwiązać, pauza — to zastąpić liczbami.

Translation:

Allow, o lady, o divine Mnemosyne, the pi number, which also is called enticingly the ludolphine, to pass to memory, so as to use it freely and quickly for help, when the problem can not be otherwise resolved, pause — this replace by the numbers.

(Note that the dash stands for zero.)

The verse of Polish mathematician Kazimierz Cwojdziński (23 decimal places):

Kuć i orać w dzień zawzięcie, bo plonów niema bez trudu. Złocisty szczęścia okręcie kołyszesz … Kuć. My nie czekajmy cudu. Robota to potęga ludu.

Translation:

Hammer and plow by day obstinately, because there are no fruits without effort. Golden ship of happiness, rocking... Hammer. Let us not wait for a miracle. Labor is the power of the people.

(12 decimal places):

Był i jest i wieki sławionym ów będzie, który kół obwód średnicą wymierzył.

Translation:

There was, and there is, and through centuries renowned will be, who circle's circumference measured with its diameter.

(10 decimal places)

Kto z woli i myśli zapragnie Pi spisać cyfry, ten zdoła

Translation:

Who out of will and mind shall wish to write the digits of Pi, shall succeed.

An occasionally seen verse related to Mundial Argentina and the Polish football team (30 decimal places):

Już i Lato i Deyna / strzelili do bramki obcej / dwa karne / Lubański dostrzegł mistrza Szarmacha / gdy on tak wypuścił cios szacha / że zdobyć musi cel gry / krzyknął Gol na Mundial Argentyna.

Translation:

Already both Lato and Deyna have scored two penalty kicks to the opponent's goal. Lubański noticed the champion Szarmach, when he had so released a Shah's strike that he's got to attain the objective of the game; he shouted 'Goal' at the World Cup Argentina.

=== Portuguese ===
(11 decimal places)

Cai a neve e novas ferrovias de marfim serão por casas trocadas.

Translation:

The snow falls and new ivory railroads will be exchanged by houses.

(8 decimal places)

Com o zero o lente reprovará os alunos.

Translation:

With zero the university professor will fail the students.

Or in Brazilian Portuguese:

Sim, é útil e fácil memorizar um número grato aos sábios.
Nós e todo o mundo guardamos pi usando letra por número.
Sou o medo e temor constante do menino vadio.

Translation:

Yes, it's useful and easy to memorize a number dear to the wisemen.
We and all the world memorize pi using letter for number.
I'm the constant fear and dread of the stray boy.

A poem written in a more poetic manner:

Sou o amor,
o homem impetuoso da libido
Homem que ataca mulheres atraentes,
meninas pecadoras que no céu imiscuem amor, paixão, fé, desejo, tudo!
Até que idolatro com as sereias pecadoras tanta fé!
Esbeltas mulheres para o musculado,
sereias e fêmeas pecadoras
Até idolatram serpentes com ardente macho.
O viril desejará as pecadoras iníquas doravante para amar.

Translation:

I am the love,
The impetuous man from the libido
Man who attacks attractive women,
sinful maidens who on heaven intrude love, passion, faith, desire, everything!
I even idolize with the mermaids so much faith!
Luscious women for the brawny,
sinful mermaids and females
They even idolize serpents with the burning buck.
The virile man will wish the sinful and the iniquitous henceforth to love.

=== Romanian ===
One of the Romanian versions of Pi poems is:

Dar o știm, e număr important ce trebuie iubit
Din toate numerele însemnate diamant neasemuit,
Cei ce vor temeinic asta prețui
Ei veșnic bine vor trăi.

Translation:

But we know, it's an important number which should be loved
Of all the significant numbers it is a peerless diamond
Those who will sincerely appreciate it
Will live happy for ever.

There is another phrase known in Romanian that will help to memorize the number by eight decimal places: Așa e bine a scrie renumitul și utilul număr. — "This is the way to write the renowned and useful number."

Another alternative for 15 decimal places:

Ion a luat o carte, biografie, în latina veche. Are cinci capitole originale clasice latinești. — "Ion has bought a book, a biography, in old latin. It has five classical original latin chapters."

=== Russian ===
In the Russian language, there is a well-known phrase in the reform of 1917 orthography of old tradition:

Кто и шутя, и скоро пожелаетъ «Пи» узнать число — ужъ знаетъ.

Translation:

The one who would wish to know the number pi easily and quickly already knows it.

A more modern rhyme is:

Это я знаю и помню прекрасно,
Пи многие знаки мне лишни, напрасны.

Translation:

I know the following and remember it perfectly,
Multitudes of the digits of pi are unnecessary and idle for me.

A short approximation is: "Что я знаю о кругах?" (What do I know about circles?)

In addition, there are several nonfolklore verses that simply rhyme the digits of pi "as is"; for examples, see the Russian version of this article.

=== Sanskrit ===
The Katapayadi System of verses is basically a system of code so that things can be defined in a way so that people can remember. The code is as follows:

1	2	3	4	5	6	7	8	9
क	ख	ग	घ	ङ	च	छ	ज	झ
ट	ठ	ड	ढ	ण	त	थ	द	ध
प	फ	ब	भ	म				
य	र	ल	व	श	ष	स	ह	क्ष

With the above key in place, Sri Bharathi Krishna Tirtha in his Vedic Mathematics gives the following verse:

गोपी भाग्य मधुव्रात श्रुङ्गिशो दधिसन्धिग
खलजीवित खाताव गलहालारसंधार

If we replace the code from the above table in the above verse, here is what we get.

31 41 5926 535 89793
23846 264 33832792

That gives us π/10=0.31415926535897932384626433832792

=== Serbian ===
(16 decimal places)

Čak i Grci i stari Vavilonci su kazali: obime kad deliš krugovim prečnikom dobijaš neophodan nam pi.

Translation:

Even Greeks and Old Babylonians have told: when dividing circumferences with circle's diameter you obtain the indispensable pi.

=== Slovene ===
The following poem gives π to 30 decimal places.

Naj z rimo v pesmi počastimo še nekoga:
Slovi naj kroga
krotilec, Sirakužan!
Število izračunal nam je res čudovito,
tule skrito.
Če nemara kdaj sam kod pozabimo
brž to pesmico uporabimo.

— A.C. Orr
Translation:

Now I, even I, would celebrate
in rhymes inept, the great
immortal Syracusan rivaled nevermore
who in his wondrous lore
passed on before
left men his guidance
how to circles mensurate.

— Translated by Janko Moder

=== Spanish ===
The following poem, giving π to 31 decimal places, is well known in Argentina:

Fue y cayó. Y queda solamente la inútil cifra con pocos destinos poderosos, tristes devenires sin el más sencillo bien. Idiota, re idiota, sabe que sus encantos son ya latosos decimales. Pobre...

Translation:

It went and it fell. And only the useless figure remains, with little powerful destinies, sad future without the simplest goodness. Idiotic, very idiotic, it knows that its charms are now boring decimals. Poor...

Another. This poem gives π (correctly rounded) to 10 decimal places. (If you prefer to not round π, then replace "cosmos" with "cielo".)

Sol y luna y mundo proclaman al eterno Autor del Cosmos.

Translation:

Sun and moon and world proclaim the eternal Author of the Cosmos. (Or "heaven", not Cosmos, if using "cielo".)

=== Turkish ===
Sen, o alan o çevre bölününce ve sonsuz rakam ile çıkan değişken dizilimli sayısın.

Translation:

You are the number with infinite digits in changing order, which is found when the circumference and the area is divided.

== Memorization record holders ==
The record for memorizing digits of π, certified by Guinness World Records, is 70,000 digits, recited in India by Rajveer Meena in 9 hours and 27 minutes on 21 March 2015.

Limca Book's record for the most decimal places of pi recited by memory is 70,030 digits, recited in India by Suresh Kumar Sharma in 17 hours 14 minutes on October 21, 2015.

Akira Haraguchi, a retired Japanese engineer, has done recitations of more digits (surpassing 100,000 decimal places on October 3, 2006), but his claims have not yet been verified by Guinness World Records.

An early record holder for pi memorization was David Fiore, whose record stood as an American record for more than 27 years, which remains the longest time period for an American recordholder. He was the first person to break the 10,000-digit mark.

== See also ==
- Mnemonist
- Cadaeic Cadenza
- Memory sport
- Pi Day
