= Le Train de Nulle Part =

French novel noted for being written without a single verb

Le Train de Nulle Part (The Train from Nowhere) is a 233-page French novel, written in 2004 by a French doctor of letters, Michel Dansel, under the pen name Michel Thaler. Notable as an example of constrained writing, the entire novel is written without a single verb.

In the novel's preface, Thaler called the verb an "invader, dictator, usurper of our literature". Considering the novel a step towards literature comparable with the artistic impact of Dadaism and surrealism, Thaler surmised, "The verb is like a weed in a field of flowers. You have to get rid of it to allow the flowers to grow and flourish. Take away the verbs and the language speaks for itself." Thaler went so far as to organize a well-attended, tongue-in-cheek funeral for the verb, at the Sorbonne in Paris.

== Sample ==
Quelle aubaine ! Une place de libre, ou presque, dans ce compartiment. Une escale provisoire, pourquoi pas ! Donc, ma nouvelle adresse dans ce train de nulle part : voiture 12, 3e compartiment dans le sens de la marche. Encore une fois, pourquoi pas ?

What luck! A vacant seat, almost, in that compartment. A provisional stop, why not? So, my new address in this nowhere train: car 12, 3rd compartment from the front. Once again, why not?

== See also ==
- Gadsby, a novel without the letter e.
- A Void, the English translation of another, considerably later, French novel, having the 'no e' restriction in both languages.
- "Tlön, Uqbar, Orbis Tertius", a story which contains a fictional world of people whose language contains no nouns.
