= Homophony (disambiguation) =

Homophony and Homophonic are from the Greek ὁμόφωνος (homóphōnos), literally 'same sounding,' from ὁμός (homós), "same" and φωνή (phōnē), "sound". It may refer to:

- Homophones − words with the same pronunciation.
- Homophony − in music is a texture in which multiple voices move together in harmony.
- Homophony (writing) − in a theory of writing systems is one of the forms of phonogram.
- Homophonic substitution cipher − a cipher that disguises plaintext letter frequencies by homophony: 'e' is given more homophonic ciphertext symbols than 'z'.

== See also ==
- Homophene - words with different pronunciation which look the same in lip reading
