= Alphabetical Africa =

1974 novel by Walter Abish

- First Edition Cover
- Author: Walter Abish
- Language: English
- Genre: Postmodern novel
- Published: 1974
- Publisher: New Directions Publishing
- Publication place: United States

Alphabetical Africa is a constrained writing experiment by Walter Abish. It is written in the form of a novel.

A paperback edition was issued in New York by New Directions Publishing in 1974 with ISBN 0-8112-0533-9. It was still in print in 2004. Writing in Esquire, Harold Bloom put it on a list of 20th century novels that will endure.

== Constraint ==
The writing is restricted by a pseudo-alliterative rule of the lipogram type: the first chapter contains only words starting with the letter a, the second chapter only words starting with a or b, etc.; each subsequent chapter adds the next letter in the alphabet to the set of allowed word beginnings. This continues for the first 25 chapters, until at last Abish is (briefly) allowed to write without constraint.

In the second half of the book, through chapter 52, letters are removed in the reverse order that they were added. Thus, z words disappear in chapter 27, y in chapter 28, etc...

== Errors ==
Readers have noted that there are several places in the narrative where the constraint is violated. Most counts of these violations number them between four and six; however, up to 43 have been noted by astute readers. One point of dispute is whether the failures to meet the constraint are intentional, and therefore potentially meaningful, or are simply editing mistakes. It is said that when Abish was notified of the errors, he reacted with total surprise. Two of the errors were "I"'s found later in the book, situated next to the margins, most likely overlooked during editing. Similar mistakes of spelling and grammar occur in other Abish works, such as How German Is It (1980), where exact presentation is clearly a priority, and thus the mistakes come across as intentional.
