= Eunoia (book) =

Book by Christian Bök

- Author: Christian Bök
- Language: English
- Subject: Univocalic poetry
- Publisher: Coach House Books
- Publication date: 2001
- Publication place: Canada
- Media type: Print (paperback)
- Pages: 112
- ISBN: 1-55245-092-9

Eunoia (2001) is an anthology of univocalics by Canadian poet Christian Bök. Each chapter is written using words limited to consonants and a single vowel, producing sentences like: "Hassan can, at a handclap, call a vassal at hand and ask that all staff plan a bacchanal". The author believes "his book proves that each vowel has its own personality, and demonstrates the flexibility of the English language." The work was inspired by the Oulipo group, which seeks to create works using constrained writing techniques.

The book was published in Canada in 2001 by Coach House Books, sold 20,000 copies, and won the 2002 Canadian Griffin Poetry Prize. Canongate Books published a British edition in 2008. The book sold well in the United Kingdom, making The Times list of the year's top 10 books and becoming the top-selling book of poetry in Britain.

The title eunoia, which literally means good thinking, is a medical term for the state of normal mental health, and is also the shortest word in the English language which contains all five vowels. The cover features a chromatic representation of Arthur Rimbaud's sonnet "Voyelles" (Vowels) in which each vowel is assigned a particular colour and consonants appear grey.

The "E" chapter was set to music by Kate Soper in her chamber piece Helen Enfettered.

== Sections ==
=== Eunoia ===
The main section of the book consists of five chapters: "A", "E", "I", "O" and "U". In each of these chapters, the only vowel used is the same one as the title. For example, in Chapter A, the only vowel used is "A". There are other rules given to each of the chapters.

- Each of the chapters must refer to the art of writing.
- Each of the chapters has "to describe a culinary banquet, a prurient debauch, a pastoral tableau and a nautical voyage."
- All the sentences must have an "accented internal rhyme through the use of syntactical parallelism."
- The text must include as many words as possible. The postscript of the book says that each chapter uses at least 98% of the available words.
- The text must avoid repeating words as much as possible.
- The letter "Y" is unused.

The chapters are dedicated to Hans Arp, René Crevel, Dick Higgins, Yoko Ono, and Zhu Yu, respectively. The postscript of the book implies that Chapter E is a retelling of the Iliad.

=== Oiseau ===
"Oiseau", meaning "bird", is the shortest word in the French language to use all five vowels. This section contains the following chapters.

- "And Sometimes": A list of all the words in English which contain no vowels.
- "Vowels": A poem in which all the words contain only combinations of the letters in the word vowels.
- "Voile": A homophonic version of "Voyelles" by Arthur Rimbaud.
- "W": An elegy to the letter "W", dedicated to Georges Perec.
- "Emended Excess": A second poem using all the words that fit the rules for Chapter E but aren't used.
