= Ernest Vincent Wright =

American writer (1871–1939)

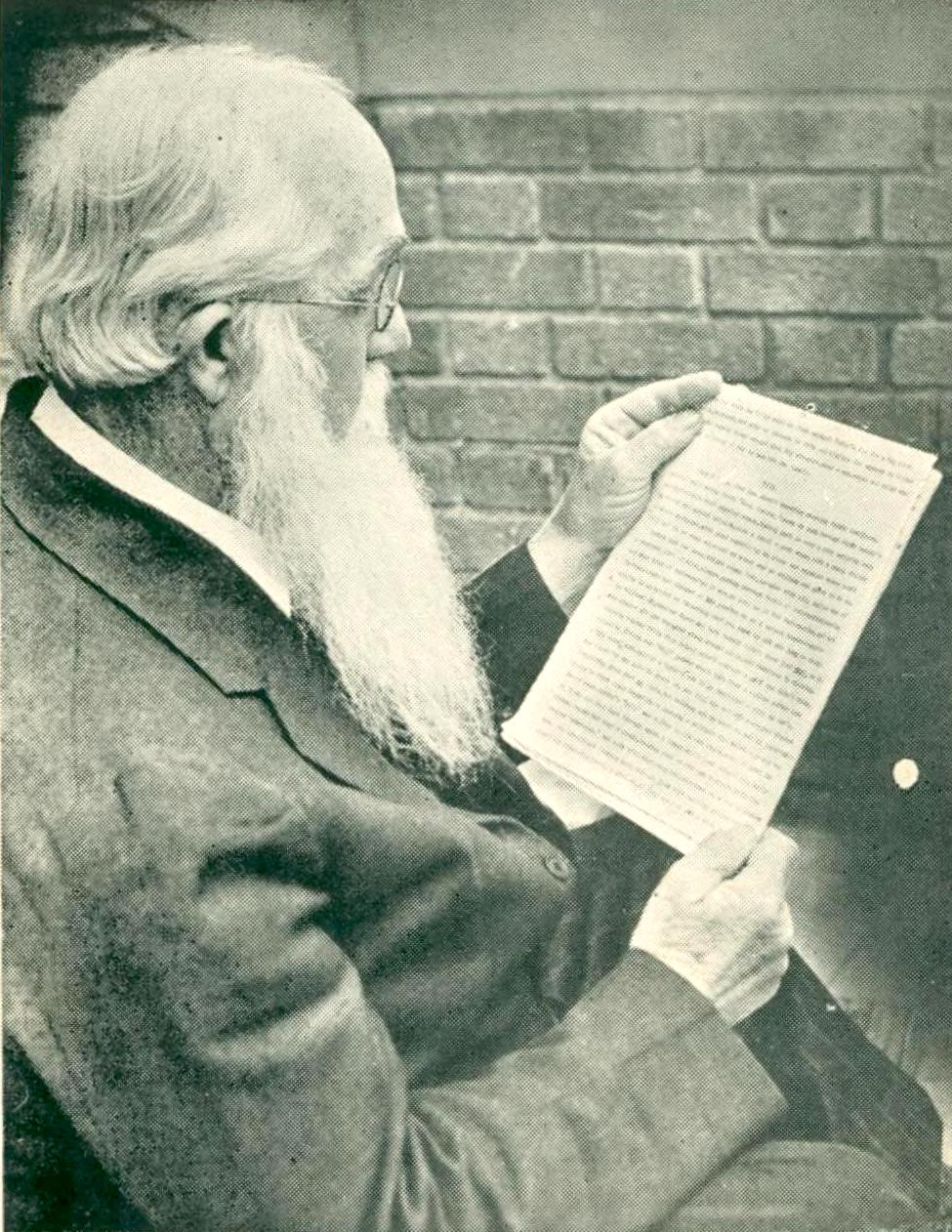
- Wright in 1939
- Born: March 26, 1871; Boston, Massachusetts, U.S.
- Died: October 6, 1939 (aged 68)
- Occupation: Writer
- Writing career
- Notable work: Gadsby

Ernest Vincent Wright (March 26, 1871 – October 6, 1939) was an American writer best known for his novel Gadsby (1939), a lipogrammatic work of more than 50,000 words that largely omits the letter "E". The novel has become one of the most widely known examples of constrained writing in the English language.

== Early life and career ==
Wright was born on March 26, 1871, in Boston, Massachusetts. His parents were Henry Estes Wright, a veteran of the American Civil War, and Clara Adelaide Wright.

According to the 1900 United States census, Wright was employed as a dancing instructor. By the time of the 1910 United States census, he was working as a salesman in the typewriter industry. During World War I, Wright served in the United States Navy and later published an account of his experiences entitled Thoughts and Reveries of an American Bluejacket (1918).

During the 1920s, Wright worked as a musician and later as a newspaper reporter and editor before turning his attention to fiction writing.

== Gadsby ==
In October 1930, Wright wrote to The Evening Independent describing a lipogrammatic manuscript he had completed and proposing that the newspaper sponsor a lipogram-writing contest with a prize of $250. The newspaper declined the proposal, expressing doubt that sufficient public interest would justify the expense.

Wright completed Gadsby in 1936 during a stay at the National Military Home in California. After being unable to secure a commercial publisher, he arranged for the novel to be published privately in 1939.

The novel consists of more than 50,000 words written without the use of the letter "E", except for a small number of accidental occurrences discovered after publication. Gadsby later gained attention among literary scholars and enthusiasts of constrained writing and has remained Wright's best-known work.

== Other works ==
In addition to Gadsby, Wright published several books, including:

- The Wonderful Fairies of the Sun (1896)
- The Fairies That Run the World and How They Do It (1903)
- Thoughts and Reveries of an American Bluejacket (1918)

His humorous poem "When Father Carves the Duck" was reprinted in a number of periodicals and anthologies.

== Legacy ==
Although little known during his lifetime, Wright's reputation grew after his death due to renewed interest in experimental literature and constrained writing. Gadsby has frequently been cited as one of the most notable examples of an English-language lipogram and is often discussed alongside later constrained works such as those associated with the French literary group Oulipo.

== Works ==
- The Wonderful Fairies of the Sun (1896)
- The Fairies That Run the World and How They Do It (1903)
- Thoughts and Reveries of an American Bluejacket (1918)
- Gadsby (1939)
