= Primeval number =

Type of natural number in recreational number theory

In recreational number theory, a primeval number is a natural number n for which the number of prime numbers which can be obtained by permuting some or all of its digits (in base 10) is larger than the number of primes obtainable in the same way for any smaller natural number. Primeval numbers were first described by Mike Keith.

The first few primeval numbers are

1, 2, 13, 37, 107, 113, 137, 1013, 1037, 1079, 1237, 1367, 1379, 10079, 10123, 10136, 10139, 10237, 10279, 10367, 10379, 12379, 13679, ... (sequence A072857 in the OEIS)

The number of primes that can be obtained from the primeval numbers is

0, 1, 3, 4, 5, 7, 11, 14, 19, 21, 26, 29, 31, 33, 35, 41, 53, 55, 60, 64, 89, 96, 106, ... (sequence A076497 in the OEIS)

The largest number of primes that can be obtained from a primeval number with n digits is

1, 4, 11, 31, 106, 402, 1953, 10542, 64905, 362451, 2970505, ... (sequence A076730 in the OEIS)

The smallest n-digit number to achieve this number of primes is

2, 37, 137, 1379, 13679, 123479, 1234679, 12345679, 102345679, 1123456789, 10123456789, ... (sequence A134596 in the OEIS)

Primeval numbers can be composite. The first is 1037 = 17×61. A Primeval prime is a primeval number which is also a prime number:

2, 13, 37, 107, 113, 137, 1013, 1237, 1367, 10079, 10139, 12379, 13679, 100279, 100379, 123479, 1001237, 1002347, 1003679, 1012379, ... (sequence A119535 in the OEIS)

The following table shows the first seven primeval numbers with the obtainable primes and the number of them.

Primeval number	Primes obtained	Number of primes
1		0
2	2	1
13	3, 13, 31	3
37	3, 7, 37, 73	4
107	7, 17, 71, 107, 701	5
113	3, 11, 13, 31, 113, 131, 311	7
137	3, 7, 13, 17, 31, 37, 71, 73, 137, 173, 317	11

== Base 12 ==
In base 12, the primeval numbers are: (using inverted two and three for ten and eleven, respectively)

1, 2, 13, 15, 57, 115, 117, 125, 135, 157, 1017, 1057, 1157, 1257, 125Ɛ, 157Ɛ, 167Ɛ, ...

The number of primes that can be obtained from the primeval numbers is: (written in base 10)

0, 1, 2, 3, 4, 5, 6, 7, 8, 11, 12, 20, 23, 27, 29, 33, 35, ...

Primeval number	Primes obtained	Number of primes (written in base 10)
1		0
2	2	1
13	3, 31	2
15	5, 15, 51	3
57	5, 7, 57, 75	4
115	5, 11, 15, 51, 511	5
117	7, 11, 17, 117, 171, 711	6
125	2, 5, 15, 25, 51, 125, 251	7
135	3, 5, 15, 31, 35, 51, 315, 531	8
157	5, 7, 15, 17, 51, 57, 75, 157, 175, 517, 751	11

Note that 13, 115 and 135 are composite: 13 = 3×5, 115 = 7×1Ɛ, and 135 = 5×31.

== See also ==
- Permutable prime
- Truncatable prime
