= Ojo con los Orozco =

1997 single by León Gieco

Single by León Gieco

from the album Orozco
- Released: 1997
- Length: 4:43; 5:20 (music video)
- Label: EMI

"Ojo con los Orozco" is a song composed by Argentine singer-songwriter León Gieco and Luis Gurevich characterized for being a monovocalic lipogram. The single is part of the album Orozco, released in 1997.

== Composition ==
This song, which is practically spoken, has the peculiarity of being a monovocalic lipogram since the only vowel pronounced in the entire lyrics is "o". The lyrics deal with the way the author sees certain groups in Argentine society. The Orozcos in the song are a family where everyone is corrupt except Rodolfo Orozco, who is a musician.

== Musical video ==
The music video for the song was very well received in Argentina and abroad. It features artists such as Alfredo Casero (presenter), Lalo Mir (presenter), Favio Posca (Pocho), Dady Brieva (Toto), Leonardo Sbaraglia (Cholo), Antonio Gasalla (Tom), Darío Grandinetti (Moncho), Miguel Ángel Solá (Otto), Enrique Pinti (Pololo) and León Gieco himself (Rodolfo).
