= Constrained writing =

Literary technique in which the writer is forced to follow a given rule

Constrained writing is a literary technique in which the writer is bound by some condition that forbids certain things or imposes a pattern.

Constraints are very common in poetry, which often requires the writer to use a particular verse form.

== Description ==
Constraints on writing are common and can serve a variety of purposes. For example, a text may place restrictions on its vocabulary, e.g. Basic English, copula-free text, defining vocabulary for dictionaries, and other limited vocabularies for teaching English as a second language or to children.

In poetry, formal constraints abound in both mainstream and experimental work. Familiar elements of poetry like rhyme and meter are often applied as constraints. Well-established verse forms like the sonnet, sestina, villanelle, limerick, and haiku are variously constrained by meter, rhyme, repetition, length, and other characteristics.

Outside of established traditions, particularly in the avant-garde, writers have produced a variety of work under more severe constraints; this is often what the term "constrained writing" is specifically applied to. For example:

- Lipogram: a letter (commonly e or o) is outlawed.
- Reverse-lipograms: each word must contain a particular letter, the opposite concept of a standard lipogram.
- Univocalic poetry, using only one vowel.
- Mandated vocabulary, where the writer must include specific words (for example, Quadrivial Quandary solicits individual sentences containing all four words in a daily selection).
- Bilingual homophonous poetry, where the poem makes sense in two different languages at the same time, constituting two simultaneous homophonous poems.
- Alliteratives or tautograms, in which every word must start with the same letter (or subset of letters; see Alphabetical Africa).
- Acrostics: first letter of each word/sentence/paragraph forms a word or sentence.
- Abecedarius: first letter of each word/verse/section goes through the alphabet.
- Palindromes, such as the word "radar", read the same forwards and backwards.
- Anglish, favouring Anglo-Saxon words over Greek and Roman/Latin words.
- Pilish, where the lengths of consecutive words match the digits of the number π.
- Anagrams, words or sentences formed by rearranging the letters of another.
- Limitations in punctuation, such as Peter Carey's book True History of the Kelly Gang, which features no commas.
- One-syllable article, a form unique to Chinese literature, using homophonic characters, usually in the form of Literary Chinese. The result looks sensible as writing, but is very confusing when read in modern Chinese varieties.
- Chaterism, where the length of words in a phrase or sentence increases or decreases in a uniform, mathematical way.
- Aleatory, where the reader supplies a random input.
- Erasure, which involves erasing words from an existing text and framing the result on the page as a poem.

The Oulipo group is a gathering of writers who use such techniques. The Outrapo group uses theatrical constraints.

There are a number of constrained writing forms that are restricted by length, including:

- Six-Word Memoirs: 6 words
- Haiku: ~ 3 lines (5–7–5 syllables or 2–3–2 beats recommended.)
- Minisaga: 50 words, +15 for title
- Drabble: 100 words
- Twiction: espoused as a specifically constrained form of microfiction where a story or poem is exactly 140 characters long.
- Sijo: three lines average 14–16 syllables, for a total of 44–46: theme (3, 4,4,4); elaboration (3,4,4,4); counter-theme (3,5) and completion (4,3).

== Notable examples ==
- Ernest Vincent Wright's Gadsby (1939) is an English-language novel consisting of 50,000 words, none of which contain the letter "e".
- In 1969, French writer Georges Perec published La Disparition, a novel that did not include the letter "e". It was translated into English in 1995 by Gilbert Adair. Perec subsequently joked that he incorporated the "e"s not used in La Disparition in the novella Les Revenentes (1972), which uses no vowels other than "e". Les Revenentes was translated into English by Ian Monk as The Exeter Text: Jewels, Secrets, Sex.
- Perec also wrote Life A User's Manual using the Knight's Tour method of construction. The book is set in a fictional Parisian block of flats, where Perec devises the elevation of the building as a 10×10 grid: 10 storeys, including basements and attics and 10 rooms across, including 2 for the stairwell. Each room is assigned to a chapter, and the order of the chapters is given by the knight's moves on the grid.
- Several of the Psalms are abecedarian in the Hebrew alphabet.
- The 2004 French novel Le Train de Nulle Part (The Train from Nowhere) by Michel Thaler was written entirely without verbs.
- let me tell you (2008), a novel by the Welsh writer Paul Griffiths, uses only the words allotted to Ophelia in Hamlet.
- Experimental Canadian poet Christian Bök's Eunoia is a univocalic that uses only one vowel in each of its five chapters.
- One famous piece of constrained writing in the Chinese language is "Lion-Eating Poet in the Stone Den", which consists of 92 characters, all with the sound shi. Another is the Thousand Character Classic in which all 1000 characters are unique without any repetition.
- "Cadaeic Cadenza" is a short story by Mike Keith using the first 3835 digits of pi to determine the length of words. Not A Wake is a book using the same constraint based on the first 10,000 digits.
- Ella Minnow Pea is a book by Mark Dunn where certain letters become unusable throughout the novel.
- Alphabetical Africa is a book by Walter Abish in which the first chapter only uses words that begin with the letter "a", while the second chapter incorporates the letter "b", and then "c", etc. Once the alphabet is finished, Abish takes letters away, one at a time, until the last chapter, leaving only words that begin with the letter "a".
- Mary Godolphin wrote versions of Robinson Crusoe, Aesop's Fables, The Swiss Family Robinson, and other books using only monosyllabic words.
- Theodor Geisel, also known as Dr. Seuss, wrote the well-known children's book Green Eggs and Ham using only 50 different words on a 50 dollar bet with Bennett Cerf.
- The Gates of Paradise is a book by Jerzy Andrzejewski where the whole text is just two sentences, one of which is very long.
- Zero Degree is a postmodern lipogrammatic novel written in 1998 by Tamil author Charu Nivedita, later translated into Malayalam and English. The Tamil words "oru" and "ondru" (the English equivalents are "a", "an" and "one") have not been mentioned anywhere in the novel, except one chapter. Keeping with the numerological theme of Zero Degree, the only numbers expressed in either words or symbols are numerologically equivalent to nine (with the exception of two chapters). This Oulipian ban includes the very common word one. Many sections of the book are written entirely without punctuation, or using only periods.
- Uruguayan musician, comedian and writer Leo Maslíah's 1999 novel Líneas (Lines) is written entirely with paragraphs comprising a single sentence.
- A novel Gorm, Son of Hardecnut (Горм, сын Хёрдакнута) (see Gorm the Old) by Peter Vorobieff is written in Russian without any words borrowed from English, French, Latin, or modern German since the 17th century. (Cf. Anglish.) The book also never uses many common words, including "human", "please", and "thank you".
- Examples of erasure include Tom Phillips's A Humument (1970); Mary Ruefle's A Little White Shadow (2006), an erasure of the Victorian novel of the same name by Emily Malbone Morgan; Janet Holmes's The ms of my kin (2009), an erasure of poetry by Emily Dickinson; Matthea Harvey's Of Lamb (2011), an erasure of a biography of Charles Lamb; ALL KINDS OF FUR, Margaret Yocom's erasure of a controversial tale from the Brothers Grimm (2018); and many more.
- Anna Rabinowitz's Darkling (2001) is a book-length acrostic about the Holocaust.
- The 17th-century Odia poet Upendra Bhanja wrote multiple epics (Satisha Bilasa, Kala Kautuka, Baidehisha Bilasha, etc.) with the same syllable at the beginning of each sentence.
- "Weird Al" Yankovic's song "Bob" has lyrics consisting entirely of palindromes.

=== Comics ===
Notable examples of constrained comics:

- Gustave Verbeek's The Upside Downs of Little Lady Lovekins and Old Man Muffaroo, a weekly 6-panel comic strip in which the first half of the story was illustrated and captioned right-side-up, then the reader would turn the page up-side-down, and the inverted illustrations with additional captions describing the scenes told the second half of the story, for a total of 12 panels.
- The Angriest Dog in the World a comic strip by David Lynch. Each four-panel comic has identical artwork. The only change between each comic is the dialogue in the first three panels.
- Dinosaur Comics which uses the same artwork, with only dialogue changing.
- Watchmen is created with a number of formal constraints; issue #5 in particular, entitled "Fearful Symmetry", follows a palindromic structure.
- Partially Clips which uses three identical panels based on clipart.
- The many works of the Oubapo group.
- Matt Madden's 99 Ways to Tell a Story.

== See also ==
- Controlled natural language
- One-letter word
- Oulipo
- Storytelling game
- Infinite canvas, a movement in comics in a sense opposite to that of constrained comics
