= Univocalic =

Antilipogrammatic Writing Style

A univocalic is a type of antilipogrammatic constrained writing that uses only consonants and a single vowel, in English "A", "E", "I", "O", or "U", and no others.

== Examples ==
- One of the best-known univocalic poems was written by C.C. Bombaugh in 1890 using "O". Bombaugh's work is still in print. An example couplet:

No cool monsoons blow soft on Oxford dons,
Orthodox, jog-trot, book-worm Solomons

- The Austrian poet Ernst Jandl composed his univocalic poem "ottos mops" ("Otto's Pug") from German words with only the vowel "O".
- A contemporary example of English-language univocalic poems is Canadian poet Christian Bök's text Eunoia, published by Coach House Press in 2001. Each chapter is restricted to a single vowel, missing four of the five vowels. For example the fourth chapter contains only "O". A typical sentence from this chapter is "Profs from Oxford show frosh who do post-docs how to gloss works of Wordsworth."
- An example of a univocalic novella is Georges Perec's Les Revenentes (sic), in which the vowel "E" is used exclusively. The sentence Je cherche en même temps l'éternel et l'éphémère (which means "I seek the eternal and the ephemeral at the same time") from this book has appeared as the epigraph for the last chapter of Life: A User's Manual. Les Revenentes has also been translated into English, titled "The Exeter Text: Jewels, Secrets, Sex" (included in the collection Three by Ian Monk), also using the vowel "E" exclusively.
- Georges Perec has also written a univocalic in A (What a man !) and one in O (Morton's ob).
- Höpöhöpö Böks by Icelandic poet Eiríkur Örn Norðdahl is a univocal lipogram using only the vowel Ö. It is composed as a tribute to Christian Bök's Eunoia.
- Eszperente is a univocalic form of Hungarian in which no vowels can be used other than "E". This task is eased somewhat as "E" is a common vowel in Hungarian. In fact the letter e can denote two similar but distinct vowels. There are poems and even some books written in Eszperente, mostly for children.
- Argentinean folk singer Leon Gieco released a novelty song in 1997 called "Ojo con los Orozco" ("Be Aware of the Orozco Brothers"); only the vowel O is featured in the song's lyrics; no other vowels are used. Its describes the personalities and proclivities of eight fictional corrupt politicians, all brothers within the same family. The rap song is in Spanish, with a heavy dose of Lunfardo, some English words, and a few pop culture references (among others, Don Johnson, Bon Scott, John Lennon and Yoko Ono are mentioned). The song's video makes heavy use of surrealistic images.
- Cornish poet Trelawney wrote the univocalic piece, Wych Nymph, in Y.
- Ioueay Oiseaux - Hoʻoponopono is a 300-line univocalic poem in O (using "Y" exclusively when it's phonetically a consonant) written by an anonymous writer Satisfire. An extract from the work, being a univocalic reinterpretation of the Ten Commandments:

«10 most common protocols of God: 1. God controls world solo; 2. Do not concoct own dolls, nor do bow to wrong gods of gold; 3. God’s honor’s worth lot, do not mock God; 4. Yom of God’s yom of God, son; 5. Honor own mom, mom’s consort too; 6. Do not knock off folks; 7. Do not bonk wrong nooks; 8. Do not prowl on folks’ lot; 9. Do not concoct bollocks; 10. Hold off for good from good folks’ lot or consorts.»
