= Fib (poetry) =

Experimental Western poetry form

Fibonacci Poem, fib or fibonaiku is an experimental Western poetry form, bearing similarities to haiku, but based on the Fibonacci sequence. That is, the typical fib and one version of the contemporary Western haiku both follow a strict structure. The typical fib is a six line, 20 syllable poem with a syllable count by line of 1/1/2/3/5/8 - with as many syllables per line as the line's corresponding place in the Fibonacci sequence; the specific form of contemporary Western haiku uses three (or fewer) lines of no more than 17 syllables in total. The only restriction on a fib is that the syllable count follow the Fibonacci sequence. An example of a typical fib:

One

Small,
Precise,
Poetic,
Spiraling mixture:

Math plus poetry yields the Fib.

— Pincus, Gregory K.

The form Pincus describes has had many poetic antecedents. John Frederick Nims discussed the concept and formal expressions of it as early as 1974, in his introduction to poetry, Western Wind. In 1981, The Figures Press published Ron Silliman's "Tjanting," in which Silliman adopts the number sequence to paragraph lengths. In her "Introduction" to The Penguin Book of the Sonnet, Editor Phillis Levin discusses ways in which the fibonacci number sequence is related to the development of the sonnet. Closer to Pincus's syllabic conception are Tony Leuzzi's three-stanza, 21-line poems, that follow a 1/1/2/3/5/8/13 structure and total 99 syllables. Marcia Birken and Anne C. Coon also discussed the fibonacci number sequence in their groundbreaking book, Discovering Patterns in Mathematics and Poetry. As Deborah Haar Clark has noted, "Fibonacci poetry is not new. It’s been around in one form or another for centuries, with works applying the numerical sequence to syllables, words, or letters." However, the six-line, 20-syllable fib itself was brought to wider public attention by Gregory K. Pincus on 1 April 2006. His blog has been the center of this new form of poetry. After Pincus published his blog on Fibs, they began appearing widely on the internet. Pincus wrote on his blog, "To my surprise (and joy), I continue to find new threads of Fibs popping up all around the Web. I've seen Fibs in over a dozen different languages, and I'd also note that today a cat left a post in the comments of The Fib, joining a priorly poetic dog, so I think it's safe to say that Fibs travel well."

== See also ==
- Cadae
