= Akira Haraguchi =

Japanese engineer (born 1946)

Akira Haraguchi (原口 證, Haraguchi Akira; born 1946, Miyagi Prefecture) is a retired Japanese engineer known for memorizing and reciting digits of pi. He is known to have recited more than 80,000 decimal places of pi in 12 hours.

== Memorization of pi ==
Haraguchi holds the current world record for reciting 100,000 digits of pi in 16 hours, starting at 9:00 a.m. (16:28 GMT) on October 3, 2006. He equaled his previous record of 83,500 digits by nightfall and then continued until stopping with digit number 100,000 at 1:28 a.m. on October 4, 2006. The event was filmed in a public hall in Kisarazu, east of Tokyo, where he had five-minute breaks every two hours to eat onigiri to keep up his energy levels. His trips to the toilet were filmed to prove that the exercise was legitimate.

His previous world record of 83,431 places was performed on 2 July 2005, itself an improvement on the earlier record he set of 54,000.

On Pi Day, 2015, he claimed to be able to recite 111,701 digits.

Despite Haraguchi's efforts and detailed documentation, the Guinness World Records have not yet accepted any of his records set.

Haraguchi views the memorization of pi as "the religion of the universe", and as an expression of his lifelong quest for eternal truth.

=== Haraguchi's mnemonic system ===
Haraguchi uses a system he developed, which assigns kana symbols to numbers, allowing for the memorization of pi as a collection of stories. The same system was developed by Lewis Carroll to assign letters from the alphabet to numbers, and creating stories to memorize numbers. This system preceded the system above which developed.

Example

0 => can be substituted by o, ra, ri, ru, re, ro, wo, on or oh;
1 => can be substituted by a, i, u, e, hi, bi, pi, an, ah, hy, hyan, bya or byan;

The same is done for each number from 2 through 9.
