= How German Is It =

Book by Walter Abish

- Author: Walter Abish
- Language: English
- Genre: Postmodern novel
- Published: 1980 W. W. Norton & Co. Inc.
- Publication place: United States

How German Is It (Wie Deutsch ist es) is a novel by Walter Abish, published in 1980. It received the PEN/Faulkner Award for Fiction in 1981. It is most often classified as a postmodern work of fiction. The novel revolves around the Hargenau brothers, Ulrich and Helmut, and their lives in and around the fictional German town of Wurtenburg.

== Plot ==
The Hargenaus were once a noble and revered family. Now the two remaining brothers, the writer Ulrich and the architect Helmut (in suhrkamp 1986: Helmuth), must reconcile their private pasts with that of their history as a whole. They are getting spied upon, bombs go off in buildings designed by Helmut, and through all this, the reality of what really went on during World War II is slowly uncovered.

== Narrative structure ==
The book's narrative structure features internal monologues and different authorial viewpoints by many of the characters. Thus, different issues are addressed from different perspectives. The main protagonist is Ulrich, who is also the primary and most frequent narrator.

== Reception ==
The novel won the PEN/Faulkner Award for Fiction in 1981.
