= Gadsby (novel) =

1939 novel written without the letter "e"

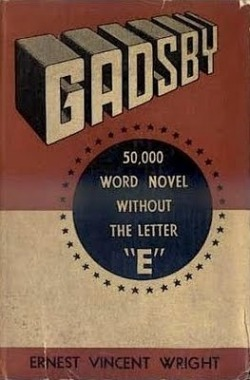
- Front dust jacket of the 1939 first edition
- Author: Ernest Vincent Wright
- Language: English
- Genre: Novel, lipogram omitting the letter E
- Publisher: Wetzel Publishing Co.
- Publication date: 1939
- Publication place: United States
- Media type: Print (hardcover)
- Pages: 260 pp
- OCLC: 57759048

Gadsby is a 1939 novel by Ernest Vincent Wright, written without words that contain the letter E, the most common letter in English. A work that deliberately avoids certain letters is known as a lipogram. The plot revolves around the dying fictional city of Branton Hills, which is revitalized as a result of the efforts of protagonist John Gadsby and a youth organizer.

Though vanity published and little noticed in its time, the book has since become a favorite of fans of constrained writing and is a sought-after rarity among some book collectors. The first edition carries on the title page and cover the subtitle A Story of Over 50,000 Words Without Using the Letter "E" (with the variant 50,000 Word Novel Without the Letter "E" on the dust jacket), sometimes dropped from late reprints.

== Lipogrammatic quality ==
In the introduction to the book (which, not being part of the story, does contain the letter 'e'), Wright says his primary difficulty was avoiding the "-ed" suffix for past tense verbs. He made extensive use of verbs that do not take the -ed suffix and constructions with "do" and "did" (for instance "did walk" instead of "walked"). Scarcity of word options also drastically limited discussion involving quantity – Wright could not write about any number between six and thirty – pronouns, and many common words.

An article in the linguistic periodical Word Ways said that 250 of the 500 most commonly used words in English were still available to Wright despite the omission of words with e.

Wright uses abbreviations on occasion, but only if the full form is similarly lipogrammatic, e.g. "Dr." (Doctor) and "P.S." (postscript) would be allowed but not "Mr." (Mister).

Wright also turns famous sayings into lipograms. Instead of William Congreve's original line, "Musick has charms to soothe a savage breast", Wright writes that music "hath charms to calm a wild bosom." John Keats' "a thing of beauty is a joy forever" becomes "a charming thing is a joy always". In other respects, Wright does not avoid topics which would otherwise require the letter "e"; for example, a detailed description of a horse-drawn fire engine is made without using the words "horse", "fire", or "engine".

== Premise ==
John Gadsby, 50, is alarmed by the decline of his hometown, Branton Hills, and rallies the city's youth to form an "Organization of Youth" to build civic spirit and improve living standards. Despite some opposition, Gadsby and his youthful army transform Branton Hills from a stagnant town into a bustling, thriving city. Towards the book's conclusion, members of Gadsby's organization receive diplomas honoring their work. Gadsby becomes mayor and helps grow Branton Hills' population from 2,000 to 60,000.

The story starts around 1906 and continues through World War I, Prohibition, and President Warren G. Harding's administration. Gadsby is divided into two parts: the first, about a quarter of the book's total length, is strictly a history of the city of Branton Hills and John Gadsby's place in it, while the second part of the book fleshes out its main characters.

== Structure ==
The novel is written from the point of view of an anonymous narrator, who continually complains about his poor writing skills and often uses circumlocution. "Now, naturally, in writing such a story as this, with its conditions as laid down in its Introduction, it is not surprising that an occasional 'rough spot' in composition is found", the narrator says. "So I trust that a critical public will hold constantly in mind that I am voluntarily avoiding words containing that symbol which is, by far, of most common inclusion in writing our Anglo-Saxon as it is, today".

=== Example prose ===
The book's opening two paragraphs are:

If Youth, throughout all history, had had a champion to stand up for it; to show a doubting world that a child can think; and, possibly, do it practically; you wouldn't constantly run across folks today who claim that "a child don't know anything." A child's brain starts functioning at birth; and has, amongst its many infant convolutions, thousands of dormant atoms, into which God has put a mystic possibility for noticing an adult's act, and figuring out its purport.

Up to about its primary school days a child thinks, naturally, only of play. But many a form of play contains disciplinary factors. "You can't do this," or "that puts you out," shows a child that it must think, practically, or fail. Now, if, throughout childhood, a brain has no opposition, it is plain that it will attain a position of "status quo," as with our ordinary animals. Man knows not why a cow, dog or lion was not born with a brain on a par with ours; why such animals cannot add, subtract, or obtain from books and schooling, that paramount position which Man holds today.

== Publication and composition ==
Wright appears to have worked on the manuscript for several years. Though its official publication date is 1939, references in newspaper humor columns are made to his manuscript of a book without an "e" years earlier. Prior to publication, he occasionally referred to his manuscript as Champion of Youth. In October 1930, while Wright was living near Tampa, Florida, he wrote a letter to The Evening Independent newspaper, boasted that he had written a fine lipogrammatic work, and suggested the paper hold a lipogram competition, with $250 for the winner. The paper turned him down.

Wright struggled to find a publisher for the book, and eventually used Wetzel Publishing Co., a self-publishing press. A 2007 post on the Bookride blog about rare books says a warehouse holding copies of Gadsby burned shortly after the book was printed, destroying "most copies of the ill fated novel". The blog post says the book was never reviewed "and only kept alive by the efforts of a few avant garde French intellos and assorted connoisseurs of the odd, weird and zany". The book's scarcity and oddness has seen original copies priced at $4,000 to $7,500 by book dealers. Wright died the same year of publication, 1939.

In 1937, Wright said writing the book was a challenge and the author of an article on his efforts in The Oshkosh Daily recommended composing lipograms for insomnia sufferers. Wright said in his introduction to Gadsby that "this story was written, not through any attempt to attain literary merit, but due to a somewhat balky nature, caused by hearing it so constantly claimed that 'it can't be done'". He said he tied down the "e" key on his typewriter while completing the final manuscript. "This was done so that none of that vowel might slip in, accidentally; and many did try to do so!" And in fact, the 1939 printing by the Wetzel Publishing Co. contains four such slips: the word "the" on pages 51, 103 and 124, and the word "officers" on page 213.

== Reception and influence ==
La Disparition (A Void) is a 1969 lipogrammatic French novel partly inspired by Gadsby that likewise omits the letter "e" and is 78,000 words long. Its author, Georges Perec, was introduced to Wright's book by a friend of his in Oulipo, a multinational constrained-writing group. Perec was aware from Wright's lack of success that publication of such a work "was taking a risk" of finishing up "with nothing [but] a Gadsby". As a nod to Wright, La Disparition contains a character named "Lord Gadsby V. Wright", a tutor to protagonist Anton Voyl; in addition, a composition attributed to Voyl in La Disparition is actually a quotation from Gadsby.

Douglas Hofstadter's 1997 book Le Ton beau de Marot quotes parts of Gadsby for illustration.

An article in the Oshkosh Daily in 1937 wrote (lipogrammatically) that the manuscript was "amazingly smooth. No halting parts. A continuity of plot and almost classic clarity obtains". The Village Voice wrote a humor column about Gadsby. Author Ed Park jokingly aped Wright's style: "Lipogram aficionados—folks who lash words and (alas!) brains so as to omit particular symbols—did in fact gasp, saying, 'Hold that ringing communication tool for a bit! What about J. Gadsby?'". David Crystal, host of BBC Radio 4's linguistics program English Now, called it "probably the most ambitious work ever attempted in this genre". Trevor Kitson, writing in New Zealand's Manawatu Standard in 2006, said he was prompted to write a short lipogram after seeing Wright's book. The attempt gave him an appreciation for how difficult Wright's task was, but he was less impressed with the result. "It seems extraordinarily twee (not that it uses that word, of course) and mostly about all-American kids going to church and getting married" he wrote.
