= Pilish =

Style of constrained writing

Pilish is a style of constrained writing in which the lengths of consecutive words or sentences match the digits of the number π (pi). The shortest example is any three-letter word, such as "hat", but many longer examples have been constructed, including sentences, poems, and stories.

== Examples ==
The following sentence is an example which matches the first fifteen digits of π:

How I need a drink, alcoholic of course, after the heavy lectures involving quantum mechanics!

The following Pilish poem (written by Joseph Shipley) matches the first 31 digits of π:

But a time I spent wandering in bloomy night;
Yon tower, tinkling chimewise, loftily opportune.
Out, up, and together came sudden to Sunday rite,
The one solemnly off to correct plenilune.

A full-length Pilish novel has been published, Not A Wake by Mike Keith which currently holds the record of the longest Pilish text with 10,000 digits represented.

== Basic Pilish and Standard Pilish ==
In order to deal with occurrences of the digit zero, the following rule set was introduced (referred to as Basic Pilish):

In Basic Pilish, each word of n letters represents

(1) The digit n if n < 10
(2) The digit 0 if n = 10

Since long runs of small non-zero digits are difficult to deal with naturally (such as 1121 or 1111211), another rule set called Standard Pilish was introduced:

In Standard Pilish, each word of n letters represents

(1) The digit n if n < 10
(2) The digit 0 if n = 10
(3) Two consecutive digits if n > 10

(for example, an 11-letter word, such as "imagination", represents the digits 1,1)

== Cadae ==
Cadae is a poetry form similar to the fib, but based on π. The word "cadae" is the alphabetical equivalent of the first five digits of π, 3.1415.

The form of a cadae is based on pi on two levels. There are five stanzas, with 3, 1, 4, 1, and 5 lines each, respectively for a total of fourteen lines in the poem. Each line of the poem also contains an appropriate number of syllables. The first line has three syllables, the second has one, the third has four, and so on, following the sequence of pi as it extends infinitely.

Rachel Hommel wrote an untitled "Cadaeic Cadae", which uses the cadaeic form as explained above, and adds a level of complexity to it wherein the number of letters in each word represents a digit of pi.

For his book, "The Burning Door," Tony Leuzzi wrote a series of 33 untitled poems in cadaeic form.

=== Cadaeic Cadenza ===
"Cadaeic Cadenza" is a 1996 short story by Mike Keith. It is an example of cadae and pilish; a cadenza is a solo passage in music. In addition to the main restriction, the author attempts to mimic portions, or entire works, of different types and pieces of literature ("The Raven", "Jabberwocky", the lyrics of Yes, "The Love Song of J. Alfred Prufrock", Rubaiyat, Hamlet, and Carl Sandburg's Grass) in story, structure, and rhyme.

Some sections of the poem use words of more than ten letters as a one followed by another digit:

And	fear	overcame	my	being	–	the	fear	of	"forevermore".
3	4	8	2	5		3	4	2	11

where 11 represents two consecutive digit "1"s in pi.

The first part of Cadaeic Cadenza is slightly changed from an earlier version, "Near a Raven", which was a retelling of Edgar Allan Poe's "The Raven". The text of poem begins:

Poe, E.
Near a Raven

Midnights so dreary, tired and weary,
Silently pondering volumes extolling all by-now obsolete lore.
During my rather long nap - the weirdest tap!
An ominous vibrating sound disturbing my chamber's antedoor.
"This", I whispered quietly, "I ignore".

— Mike Keith, First verse of Near a Raven

== See also ==
- Constrained writing
- Piphilology
- Six nines in pi (handled at the start of chapter 2, "Change")
