= The Castle of the Pyrenees =

Painting by René Magritte

- Artist: René Magritte
- Year: 1959
- Medium: Oil on canvas
- Dimensions: 200 cm × 145 cm (79 in × 57 in)
- Location: Israel Museum, Jerusalem

The Castle of the Pyrenees (French: Le Château des Pyrénées) is an oil-on-canvas painting by the Belgian surrealist René Magritte, completed in 1959. It is held at the Israel Museum, in Jerusalem.

== History and description ==
The painting depicts a large rock floating above a sea, topped by a stone castle. Magritte's friend Harry Torczyner, a lawyer and author, commissioned the painting and chose its theme. The painting is displayed in the Israel Museum, in Jerusalem, along with Magritte's correspondence with Torczyner.

The painting is one of several Magritte works depicting stones, which were a frequent theme in his 1950s work. The work was influenced by the French expression "châteaux en Espagne" ("castles in Spain"), which refers to impossible dreams; the Pyrenees mountain range runs along the border between France and Spain. It is one of Magritte's most reproduced paintings and has been cited as an inspiration by artists such as John Baldessari, Edward Ruscha, and Martin Kippenberger. A 2008 novel by Norwegian author Jostein Gaarder is named after the painting.

In the story notes to Stories of Your Life and Others, Ted Chiang says that The Castle of the Pyrenees was one of the inspirations for "Tower of Babylon".

== See also ==
- List of paintings by René Magritte
- 1959 in art
