= The Exeter Text: Jewels, Secrets, Sex =

The Exeter Text: Jewels, Secrets, Sex is a translation into English by Ian Monk of Georges Perec's 1972 novel Les Revenentes. This translation appeared in 1996 in the collection Three by Georges Perec. The novel depicts the theft of gems and the emergence of sex in the Bishopric of Exeter.

== Univocalic Challenge ==
The original French novel is univocalic in the vowel "e"—i.e., the only vowel used is "e", and Monk preserved this constraint, crafting readable English text without using "a", "i", "o", or "u" in the translation. As its misspelled title suggests, Les Revenentes scrupulously adheres to the constraints Georges Perec imposed upon himself, even at the risk of disregarding some rules of French spelling.

In the original French version there is a parallel between the increasing liberties Perec takes with the French language and the fact that the text becomes increasingly licentious, even pornographic. Ian Monk uses the same device in his translation, using only the vowel "e" while escalating linguistic distortions as the narrative becomes progressively more graphic.

== Sequel to La Disparition ==
In 1969 Perec wrote La Disparition (en: the Disappearance), a lipogrammatic novel that proscribes the letter "e". In 1972 he wrote its antithesis, Les Revenentes, a novel univocalic in the vowel "e".

Omitting "e" entirely in La Disparition caused its absence to haunt the narrative. Les Revenentes, by using "e" as its only vowel, makes "e" omnipresent amid ghostly returns and licentious excess. No word (except vowel-less ones) can appear in both novels, rendering them mutually exclusive universes.

La Disparition was translated into English by Gilbert Adair, with the title A Void, for which he won the Scott Moncrieff Prize in 1995.

== See also ==
- Univocalic
- Oulipo
