= Walter Abish =

Austrian-American author (1931–2022)

- Born: December 24, 1931; Vienna, Austria
- Died: May 28, 2022 (aged 90); Manhattan, New York, U.S.
- Occupation: Author

Walter Abish (December 24, 1931 – May 28, 2022) was an Austrian-born American author of experimental novels and short stories. He was conferred the PEN/Faulkner Award for Fiction in 1981 and was awarded a MacArthur Fellowship six years later.

== Early life ==
Abish was born in Vienna on December 24, 1931. His family was Jewish. His father, Adolph, worked as a perfumer; his mother was Friedl (Rubin).

When he was seven, he fled with his family from the Nazis, traveling first to Italy and Nice. They settled in Shanghai in 1940, a city with numerous European Jewish refugees, where they lived until 1949.

In 1949, the family relocated to Israel, where Abish served in the army and developed an interest in writing. He settled in the United States in 1957 and became an American citizen three years later.

== Career ==
Abish published his first novel, Alphabetical Africa, in 1974. The book, whose first and last chapters employ only words starting with the letter "A", was characterized by Richard Howard in The New York Times Book Review as "something more than a stunt, though a stunt it is."

This was followed by his first collection of stories, Minds Meet, a year later, with one story envisaging Marcel Proust in Albuquerque. His second collection, In the Future Perfect, was released in 1977 and juxtaposed words in unusual patterns to form alphanumeric games. Writing in The Tennessean, Alfred Sims noted that, as in Abish's previous work, "Here again the old war horses of plot and narrative line are sacrificed in favor of reflections on the nature and use of language."

Abish was conferred a literature fellowship by the National Endowment for the Arts in 1979.

He published a second novel, How German Is It, the following year. Recognized as his most celebrated work, it garnered him the PEN/Faulkner Award for Fiction in 1981. Of Abish's prose, the PEN/Faulkner judges (William H. Gass, Tim O'Brien, Elizabeth Hardwick) said: "It helps keep the American novel alive in its time. The prose of this novel is as cold as snow in a storm and as driven."

He also received a Guggenheim Fellowship (1981) and a MacArthur Fellowship (1987). He served on the contributing editorial board of the literary journal Conjunctions.

Abish's third collection, 99: the New Meaning, was released in 1990 as a "limited edition of five collagist stories".

His last novel, Eclipse Fever (1993), received mixed reviews, with James Atlas describing its protagonist in The Times Book Review as "even for a literary critic, something of a bore". But Will Self, reviewing the book in The Independent, wrote: "Abish, unlike a populist film maker, doesn't simply produce snapshots to be passed among the mass. He tears treasured portraits from our culture's family album and thrusts them into his cunning slide carousel. Clicking from one page to the next, we reflect not on the death of literary fiction but on its vitality."

Abish worked and taught at Empire State College, Wheaton College, University at Buffalo, The State University of New York, Columbia University, Brown University, Yale University, and Cooper Union. He also served on the board of International PEN from 1982 to 1988. He was on the board of governors for the New York Foundation for the Arts. Abish was elected a Fellow of the American Academy of Arts and Sciences in 1998.

== Personal life ==
Abish married Cecile Gelb, a photographer and sculptor, in 1953. They remained married until his death. They did not have children.

Abish died on May 28, 2022, at Mount Sinai Beth Israel in Manhattan at 90 years old.

== Bibliography ==
- Duel Site – poetry, 1970
- Alphabetical Africa – novel, 1974 ISBN 978-0-8112-0533-7
- Minds Meet – story collection, 1975 ISBN 978-0-8112-0557-3
- In the Future Perfect – story collection, 1977 ISBN 978-0-8112-0659-4
- How German Is It (Wie deutsch ist es) – novel, 1980 ISBN 978-0-8112-0776-8
- 99: The New Meaning – story collection, 1990 ISBN 978-0-930901-66-0
- Eclipse Fever – novel, 1993 ISBN 978-0-679-41867-2
- Double Vision: A Self-Portrait – memoir, 2004 ISBN 978-0-679-41868-9

== Awards ==
- 1972 – Fellow of New Jersey State Council on the Arts
- 1974 – Rose Isabel Williams Foundation grant
- 1977 – Ingram Merrill Foundation grant
- 1979 – Fellow of National Endowment for the Arts
- 1981 – Guggenheim fellowship
- 1981 – CAPS grant
- 1981 – PEN/Faulkner Award for Fiction
- 1985 – Fellow of National Endowment for the Arts How German Is It
- 1987 – Fellow of German Academic Exchange Service
- 1987 – MacArthur Fellows Program
- 1991 – American Academy and Institute of Arts and Letters Award of Merit Medal for the Novel
- 1992 – Lila Wallace-Reader's Digest Fund fellowship
