= Mike Keith (mathematician) =

American mathematician

Michael Keith (born 1955) is an American mathematician, software engineer, and author of works of constrained writing.

Keith was employed at Sarnoff Corporation from 1980 until 1990 and Intel Corporation from 1990 to 1998, both tenures involving work in multimedia software. He was part of the original team at Sarnoff that developed Digital Video Interactive, the first PC digital video system, and at Intel he was a member of the group that developed Indeo, another video compression standard. As a result of this work Keith is credited as inventor or co-inventor on 60 US patents. As of 2014 he works as a software designer, developer, and tester.

Keith was the first to describe primeval numbers and Keith numbers. His self-published book From Polychords to Pólya: Adventures in Musical Combinatorics is about the application of the Pólya enumeration theorem to the counting and classification of musical constructs such as chords, scales, and rhythms.

Keith has written several long works of constrained writing, such as Cadaeic Cadenza, a story in which the number of letters in successive words spells out the first 3835 digits of the number pi; the book Not A Wake: A Dream Embodying π's Digits Fully for 10000 Decimals, which similarly encodes the first 10,000 digits of pi with texts composed in various literary styles; and the book The Anagrammed Bible: Proverbs, Ecclesiastes, Song of Solomon, co-written with Richard Brodie, in which the roughly 95,000 letters of the original text are rearranged into a modern paraphrase. His constrained writing and articles on logology were a regular feature of Word Ways: The Journal of Recreational Linguistics.
