= Homophony (writing) =

Examples of homophony

In the theory of writing systems, homophony (from the Greek: ὁμός, homós, "same" and Greek: φωνή, phōnē, "sound") refers to the presence or use of different signs (phonograms) for the same syllabic value, i.e. the same sound combination may be represented by different signs.

== Akkadian ==
In Chapter 4 of 'Akkadian language', a book on the origin and development of cuneiform, John Heise gives the following example (see cuneiform transliteration):

Heise comments: “In transliterations the same sounds that are represented by different cuneiform signs are distinguished with an accent or an index. The signs for ni, ní (i with accent aigu), nì (i with accent grave), ni4, ni5, ... are all different cuneiform symbols. ní may be called (and pronounced among Assyriologists) ni2 and nì as ni3. These accents thus have nothing to do with word accent.”

== English ==
English is rich in homophony. Of forty-four English language sound combinations, listed in one dictionary, thirty-nine of them have more than two signs, and only one of them has one sign. The English consonant sound represented in IPA as /k/ has these homophones: car, kill, account, bacchanal, character, back, acquaint, lacquer, sacque, biscuit, lough, rake, Sikh, walk, Iraq, liquor, and plaque. The English vowel sound represented in IPA as /ə/ has these homophones (varying with the speaker): alone, system, easily, gallop, circus, mountain, mullein, dungeon, parliament, legion, porpoise, curious, Abyssinia.
