= A Void =

1969 novel by Georges Perec

- Cover of the English translation of La Disparition
- Author: Georges Perec
- Original title: La Disparition
- Translator: Gilbert Adair
- Language: French
- Publisher: Gallimard (original); The Harvill Press (English translation)
- Publication date: 1969
- Publication place: France
- English publication date: 1995
- Media type: Print (hardcover, paperback)
- Pages: 290 pp (English translation hardcover)
- ISBN: 0-00-271119-2 (English translation hardcover)
- OCLC: 31434932

A Void, translated from the original French La Disparition (lit. 'The Disappearance'), is a 300-page French lipogrammatic novel, put out in 1969 by Georges Perec, written wholly without using the letter e, following Oulipo constraints.

== Plot summary ==
A Void's plot follows a group looking for a missing companion, Anton Vowl. It is in part a parody of noir and horror fiction, with many stylistic tricks, gags, plot twists, and a grim conclusion. On many occasions it implicitly talks about its own lipogrammatic limitation, highlighting its unusual syntax. A Void's protagonists finally work out which symbol is missing, but find it a hazardous topic to discuss, as any who try to bypass this story's constraint risk fatal injury. Philip Howard, writing a lipogrammatic appraisal of A Void in his column Lost Words, said: "This is a story chock-full of plots and sub-plots, of loops within loops, of trails in pursuit of trails, all of which allow its author an opportunity to display his customary virtuosity as an avant-gardist magician, acrobat and clown."

== Major themes ==
Georges Perec's direct kin passed away in World War II: his father as a GI, his mother in the Holocaust. Perec was brought up by his aunt and uncle. Warren Motte finds the lack of any e in the book as a stand-in for Perec's own notion of loss and spiritual limbo:

The absence of a sign is always the sign of an absence, and the absence of the E in A Void announces a broader, cannily coded discourse on loss, catastrophe, and mourning. Perec cannot say the words père ["father"], mère ["mother"], parents ["parents"], famille ["family"] in his novel, nor can he write the name Georges Perec. In short, each "void" in the novel is abundantly furnished with connotation, and each points toward the existential void that Perec fought with throughout his youth and early adulthood. A strange and compelling parable of survival becomes apparent in the novel, too, if one is willing to reflect on the struggles of a Holocaust orphan trying to make sense out of absence, and those of a young writer who has chosen to do without the letter that is the beginning and end of écriture ["writing"].

== Translations ==
It was translated into English by Gilbert Adair, with the title A Void, for which he won the Scott Moncrieff Prize in 1995. The Adair translation of the book also won the 1996 Firecracker Alternative Book Award for Fiction.

Various English translations are titled A Vanishing by Ian Monk, Vanish'd! by John Lee, and Omissions by Julian West.

All translators have asked that the text follow the lipogrammatic constraint of the original work, avoiding the most commonly used letter of the alphabet. This precludes the use of words normally considered crucial such as je ("I"), et ("and"), and le (masculine "the") in French, as well as "me", "be", and "the" in English. The Spanish version contains no a, which is the second most common suffix in the Spanish language (first being e), while the Russian version contains no о. In Japan, "A Void" contains no syllables with the sound "i" (い, き, し, etc.) at all.

Other languages translations
Language	Author	Title	Year
German	Eugen Helmlé	Anton Voyls Fortgang	1986
Italian	Piero Falchetta	La scomparsa	1995
Spanish	Marisol Arbués, Mercé Burrel, Marc Parayre, Hermes Salceda and Regina Vega	El secuestro	1997
Swedish	Sture Pyk	Försvinna	2000
Russian	Ales Astashonok-Zhgirovsky	Исчезновение [Ischeznovenie]	2001
Russian	Valeriy Kislov	Исчезание [Ischezanie]	2005
Turkish	Cemal Yardımcı	Kayboluş	2006
Dutch	Guido van de Wiel	't Manco	2009
Romanian	Serban Foarta	Disparitia	2010
Japanese	Shuichiro Shiotsuka	煙滅 [Emmetsu]	2010
Croatian	Vanda Mikšić	Ispario	2012
Portuguese	José Roberto "Zéfere" Andrades Féres	O Sumiço	2016
Catalan	Adrià Pujol Cruells	L'eclipsi	2017
Polish	René Koelblen and Stanisław Waszak	Zniknięcia	2022
Finnish	Ville Keynäs	Häviäminen	2023

== Versions ==
- Georges Perec (1969). La disparition. Gallimard. ISBN 2-07-071523-X.
- Georges Perec (1994). A Void (paperback). Translated by Gilbert Adair. The Harvill Press. ISBN 1-86046-098-4.
- Georges Perec (1994). A Void (hardcover). Translated by Gilbert Adair. The Harvill Press. ISBN 0-00-271119-2.
- Georges Perec (1991). Anton Voyls Fortgang. Translated by Eugen Helmlé. ISBN 3-499-12857-8.
- Georges Perec (April 2013). Kayboluş. Translated by Cemal Yardımcı. ISBN 978-975-539-472-5.
- Georges Perec (2009). 't Manco. Translated by Guido van de Wiel. De Arbeiderspers. ISBN 978-90-295-6766-4.
- Georges Perec (1997). El secuestro. Anagrama. ISBN 978-84-339-0836-0.
- Georges Perec (2004). Istchezanie. Translated by Valéry Kislov. Ivan Limbakh. ISBN 978-5-89059-060-2.
- Georges Perec (2005). A Void (paperback). Translated by Gilbert Adair. David R. Godine. ISBN 978-1-56792-296-7.
- Georges Perec (2022). Zniknięcia (paperback). Translated by René Koelblen and Stanisław Waszak. Lokator. ISBN 978-83-63056-88-9.

== See also ==
- Gadsby, another novel without the letter e
- Le Train de Nulle Part, a novel without any verbs
- Les Revenentes, a novel using words containing “e” and no other vowels.
