= One-letter word =

Word composed of a single letter

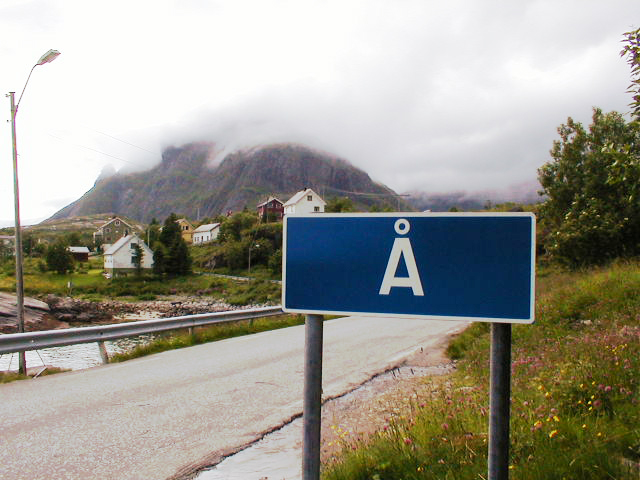
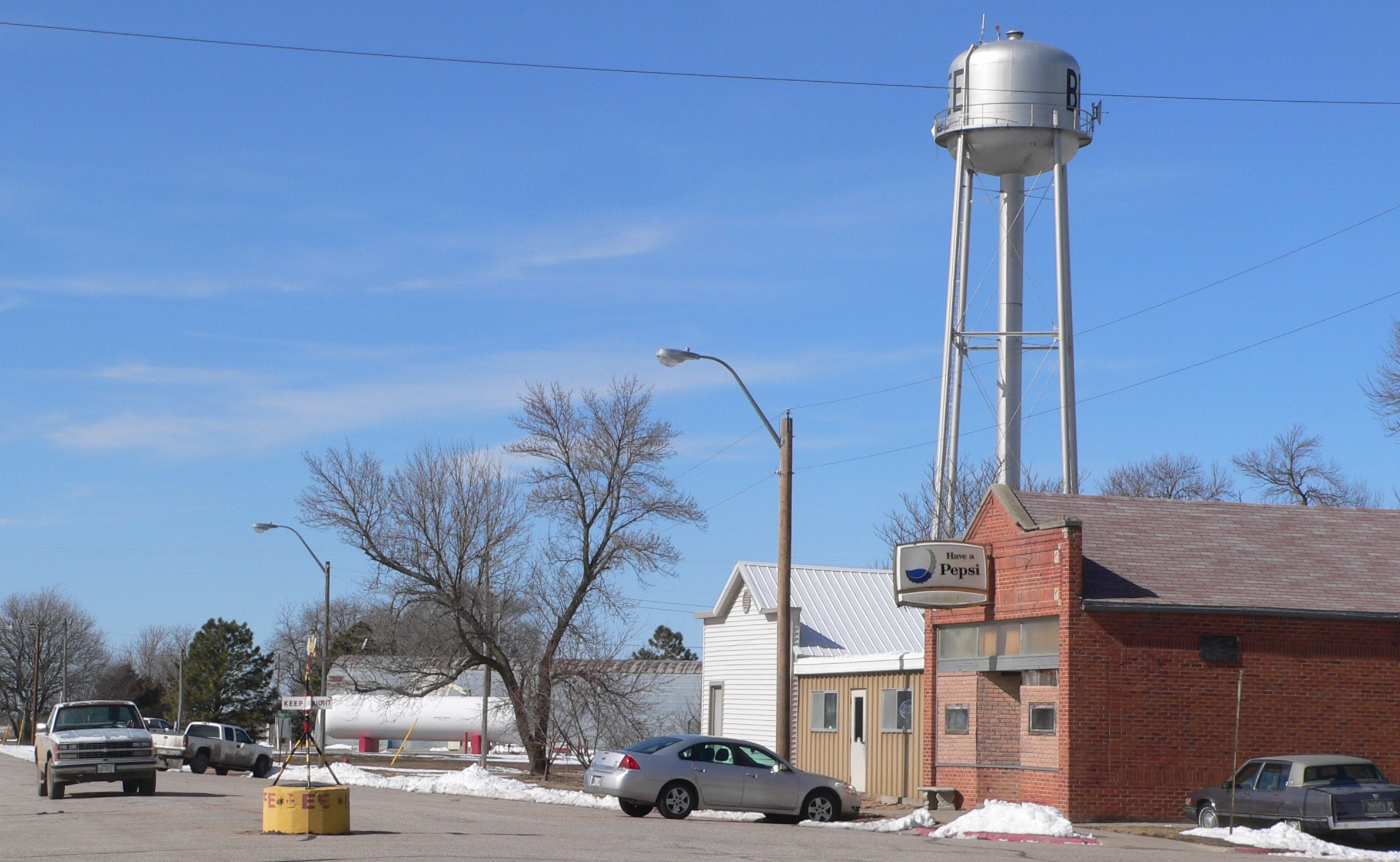
Å (Norway) and Bee (Nebraska) (Note: Bee is the English name for B. Several countries have one-letter place names, including several Ås in Denmark, Norway and Sweden; a D in the USA; an E in Scotland; two Ls in the USA; an Ø in Denmark, several Ôs in France; a U in the Federated States of Micronesia and a Y in France.)

A one-letter word is a word composed of a single letter. The application of this apparently simple definition is complex, due to the difficulty of defining the notions of 'word' and 'letter'. One-letter words have an uncertain status in language theory, dictionaries and social usage. They are sometimes used as book titles, and have been the subject of literary experimentation by Futurist, Minimalist and Ulypian poets.

== Meaningfulness as a concept ==
=== Word ===
For linguists, the term 'word' is far from unambiguous. It is defined graphically as a set of letters between two word dividers, with Jacques Anis adding that "the word thus seems to have a real existence only in writing, through the blanks that isolate it." This pragmatic definition can already be found in Arnauld and Lancelot's Port-Royal Grammar, published in 1660: "We call a word what is pronounced apart and written apart." In this sense, any isolated letter forms a word, even if it carries no meaning. Semantically, a word is defined as a morpheme, "the smallest unit of meaning." In this respect, an isolated letter is a word only if it carries meaning. (Note: This criterion can be difficult to apply, as in the poems of E. E. Cummings, where the "scattered letters" accentuate the polysemy of the text.)

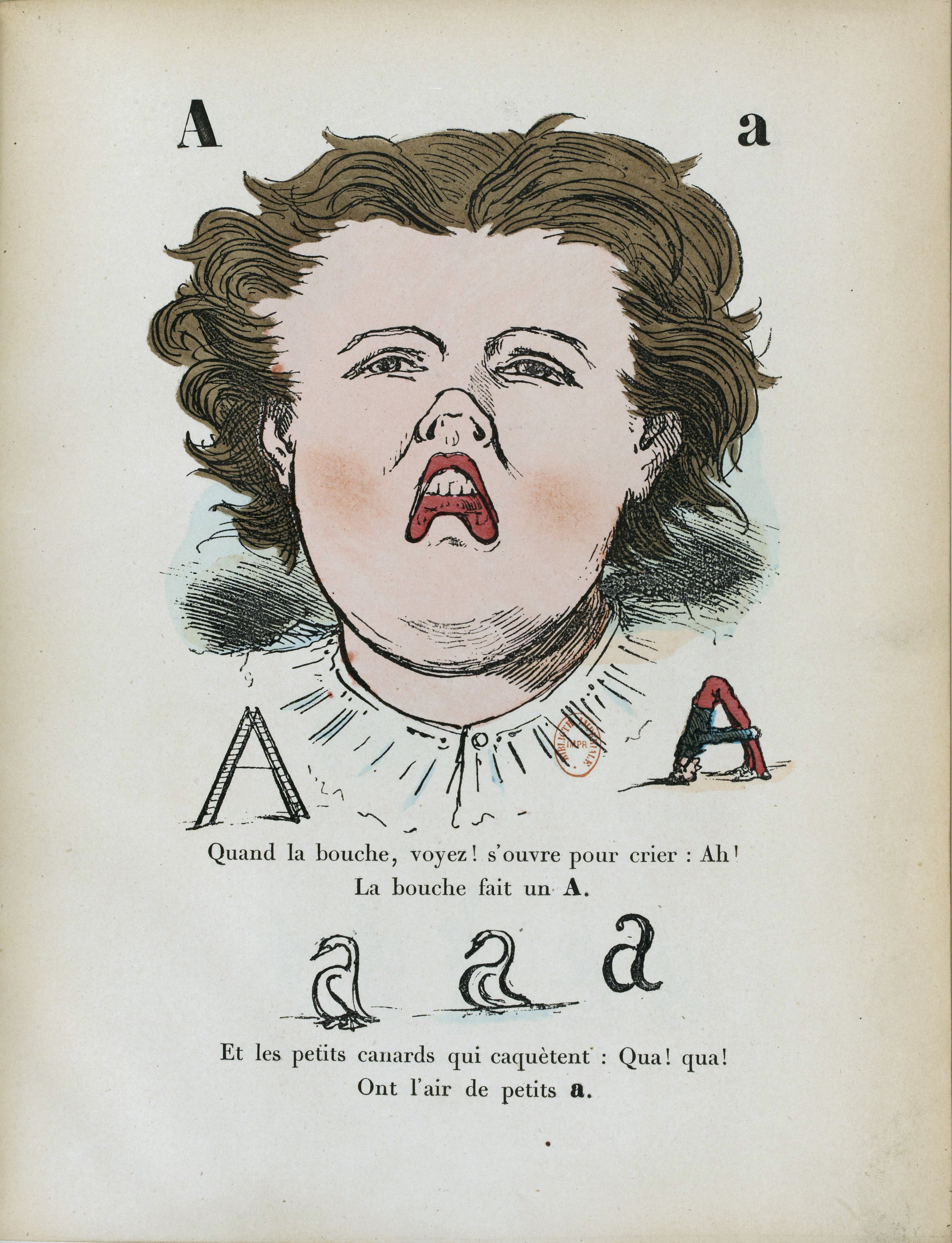
A in A. B. C. Trim, enchanted alphabet by Louis Ratisbonne illustrated by Bertall

For Françoise Benzécri, the bijection seems obvious: (Note: The question has been addressed more widely, notably by George Edward Moore and Willard Van Orman Quine, in the context of the distinction between use and mention. For his part, the American conceptual artist Joseph Kosuth considers that "an atomic character, such as a single-letter word, is still a description, whereas a composite image, such as a group portrait, is a representation".) "Every letter of an ordinary alphabet is associated with the one-letter word it constitutes, noted as that letter," but Darryl Francis notes on the contrary that the meaning of one-letter words is not reduced to designating the letter that constitutes them. Solange Cuénod also asserts that a one-letter word "has no reason to be taken as that letter," and gives the following example:

"If I ask you [in French] how to say a in English, depending on whether you consider it to be the letter of the alphabet, or the word containing only that letter, your answer will be different. It will be either a (pronounced ei), or has. So there's no need to confuse the verb avoir in the third person singular of the present indicative with the letter used to write it." (Note: In this example, we're talking about homonymy rather than polysemy, a distinction that can be difficult to make, especially with one-letter words.)

Linguist Malgorzata Mandola doubts that a one-letter toponym can have semantic value in the case of the village of Y in the Somme, and believes that it is rather what the grammarian Lucien Tesnière calls a "grammatical word, devoid of any semantic function". Marcel Proust, on the other hand, distinguishes between the nom propre (proper noun) and the mot commun (common noun), because for him, as Roland Barthes puts it, the mot commun is "a voluminous sign, a sign always full of a thick, dense layer of meaning, which no use reduces or flattens, unlike the nom commun:"

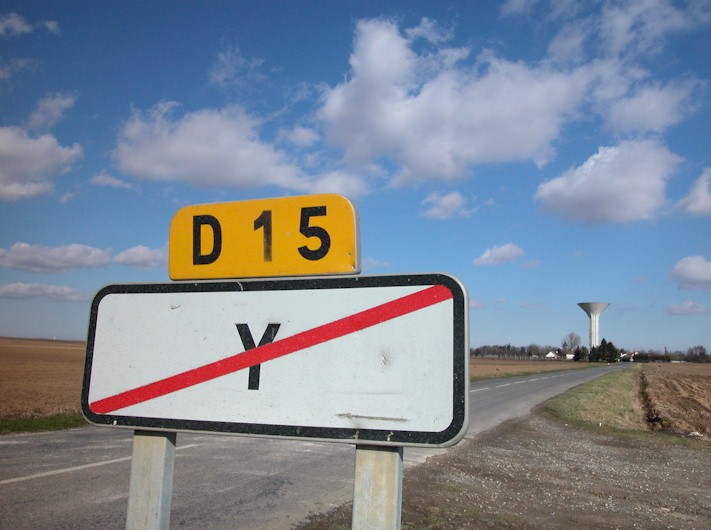
Y, Somme

"Words present us with a small, clear and usual image of things [...] But names present people — and cities, which they accustom us to believe are individual, unique as people — with a confused image that draws from them, from their bright or dark sound, the color with which it is uniformly painted."

=== Letter ===
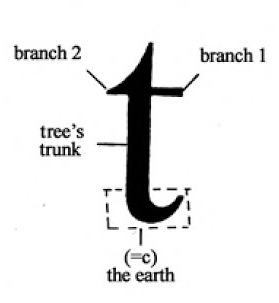
For Gao-ming Zhang and Hong Yang, the t is the ideogram for a tree.

Letters are the elements of an alphabet, i.e. a writing system based on the representation of sounds, as opposed to ideograms, which are often the origin of images. (Note: However, Gao-ming Zhang and Hong Yang maintain that the letters have an ideographic value in English.) From this perspective, it is atypical for a lone letter to convey anything beyond its literal meaning, whereas an ideogram may convey more than one concept simultaneously. (Note: In Japan, one-letter words in kanji are particularly popular and the choice of the most popular is the subject of an annual poll.) Linguists understand letters as graphemes, and classify them into three groups: alphabetic graphemes or alphagrams, "punctuo-typographic graphemes" or "topograms", which correspond to punctuation marks, and "logographic graphemes" or logograms, which comprise "logograms stricto sensu, grapheme-signs noting word-morphemes (such as & and $) and quasi-logograms, such as acronyms, which turn a sequence of alphagrams into a global unit." The alphabetic grapheme is defined either as the representation of a phoneme, (Note: It's an ideal match, in the sense that, for Antoine Arnauld and Claude Lancelot's Grammaire de Port-Royal, in an ideal writing system every character would mark only one sound, and every sound would be marked by only one character.) or as the minimal unit of the graphic form of the expression, the second definition, often preferred, assimilating the alphabetic grapheme to the letter as a component of the alphabet.

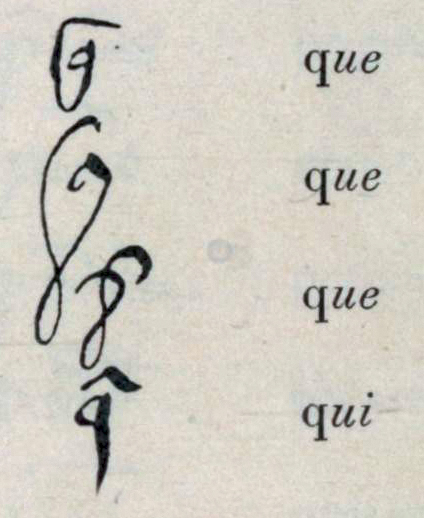
Medieval variations on the Q

Several authors have pointed out that there can be no more one-letter words than there are letters in the alphabet, such as Françoise Benzécri, for whom there are "as many one-letter words as there are letters." This apparently self-evident statement, however, does not take into account the impact of diacritical marks. In addition to the 26 letters of the Latin alphabet, the French language uses 16 diacritical letters accepted by the civil registry: à, â, ä, ç, é, è, ê, ë, ï, î, ô, ö, ù, û, ü and ÿ. It is also customary to retain the original diacritics in the transcription of proper names written in Latin characters in the original language, such as Å or Ø. These diacritical letters are considered unique graphemes. The same applies to graphemes resulting from elision: c', ç', d', j', l', m', n', s', t' and z'. The sixteenth-century typographical use of "q̃" for "que," notably by Joachim du Bellay and Jean de Sponde, could lead us to consider it a diacritical letter. But it is rather the transcription of an abbreviation from a Tironian note, conventionally rendered as "q'", which is to be considered as a logogram, just like the "K with diagonal stroke," abbreviative of the Breton toponym Caer, and transcribed as "k," which is officially considered as a "manifest alteration of the spelling."

Summary table of French one-letter words (Note: This table does not take into account diacritical letters used for the transcription of foreign words with more than one letter, such as Á.)
Without diacritic	A	B	C	D	E	F	G	H	I	J	K	L	M	N	O	P	Q	R	S	T	U	V	W	X	Y	Z
Acute accent					É																					
Circumflex	Â				Ê				Î						Ô						Û					
Grave accent	À				È																Ù					
Apostrophe			C'	D'						J'		L'	M'	N'					S'	T'						Z'
Bar															Ø											
Cedilla			Ç																							
Cedilla and Apostrophe			Ç'																							
Overring	Å																									
Diaeresis	Ä				Ë				Ï						Ö						Ü				Ÿ	

Word designating only the associated letter.

== Uncertain status ==
=== In language theory ===
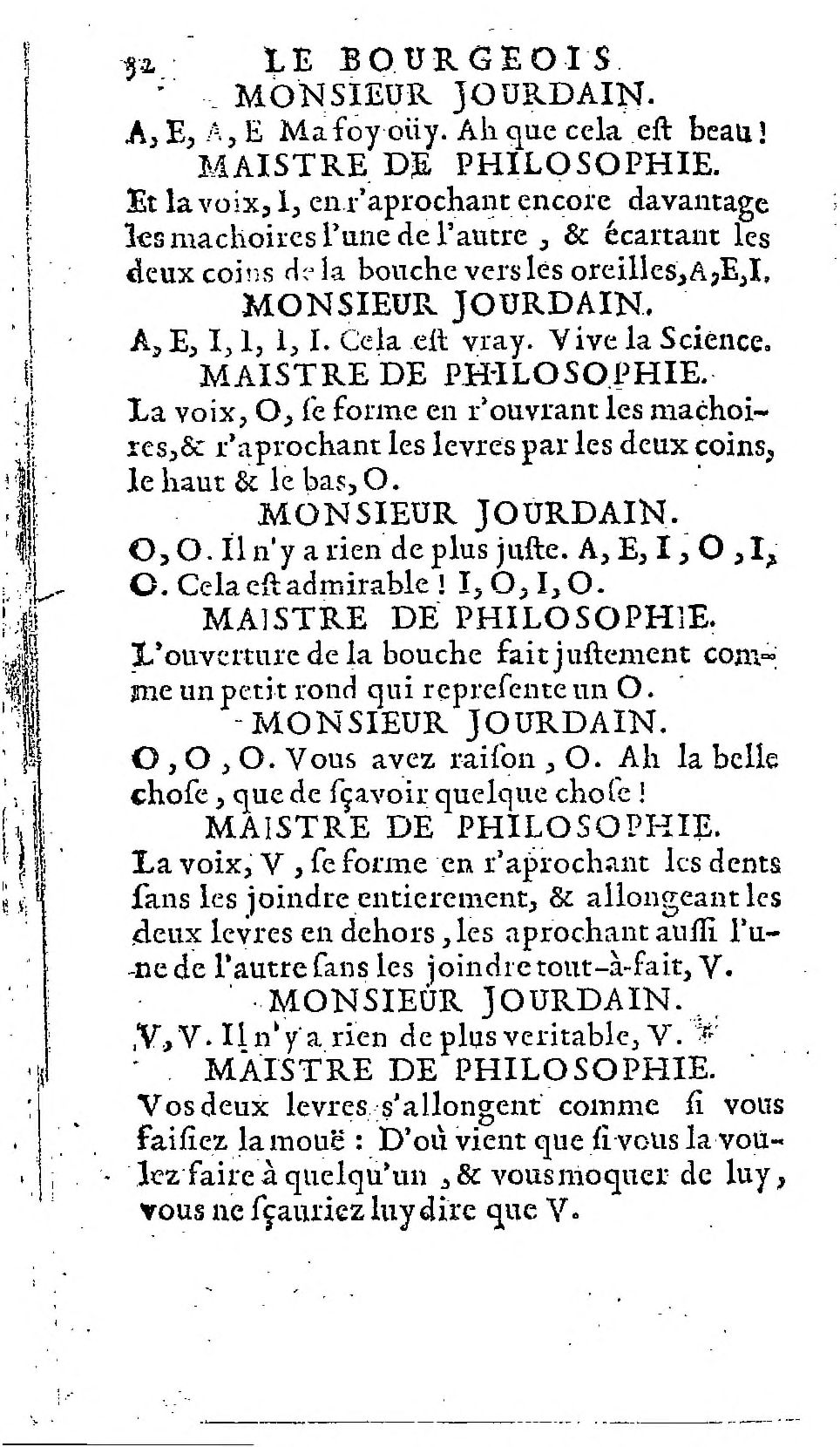
Monsieur Jourdain's introduction to O phonomimography

The existence of one-letter words goes against Platonic language theory, as letters are meant to be sublexical units, intended to be combined with others to form words. As a result, Platonists developed a kind of aversion to single-letter words. Geber and the medieval Arab grammarians thus considered that a true word could not consist of less than two letters, and Leibniz excluded one-letter words from meaningful combinations.

Reflections on the meaning and importance of one-letter words, however, return to a debate on which Plato took a stance in the Cratylus, and which Gérard Genette summarizes as follows:

"Placed between two opponents, one of whom (Hermogenes) holds to the so-called conventionalist thesis [...] according to which names simply result from an agreement and convention [...] between men, and the other (Cratylus) to the so-called naturalistic thesis [...] according to which each object has received a "right name" that belongs to it according to a natural propriety, Socrates seems first to support the second against the first, then the first against the second".

While contemporary linguists most often agree with Ferdinand de Saussure that "the linguistic sign is arbitrary" and that this principle "is not contested by anyone," this has not always been the case. The cratylic impulse has long haunted theories of language, leading to the attribution of mimetic meaning to letters in general, and to single-letter words in particular.

As Genette points out, this supposed mimesis is not only phonic, but sometimes graphic too:

"Writing can be conceived, as well as speech, as an imitation of the objects it designates [...] A so-called phonetic script, such as ours, can also be conceived as an imitation of the sounds it notes, each letter (for example) being the visual analogon of a phoneme [... ] Mimology in general can be divided into mimophony (the terrain of classical cratylism) and mimography, which in turn is subdivided into ideomimography and phonomimography. These two varieties of mimography are theoretically quite heterogeneous, and independent of each other. In practice, however, they may come together.

Hieroglyphic and primitive alphabet
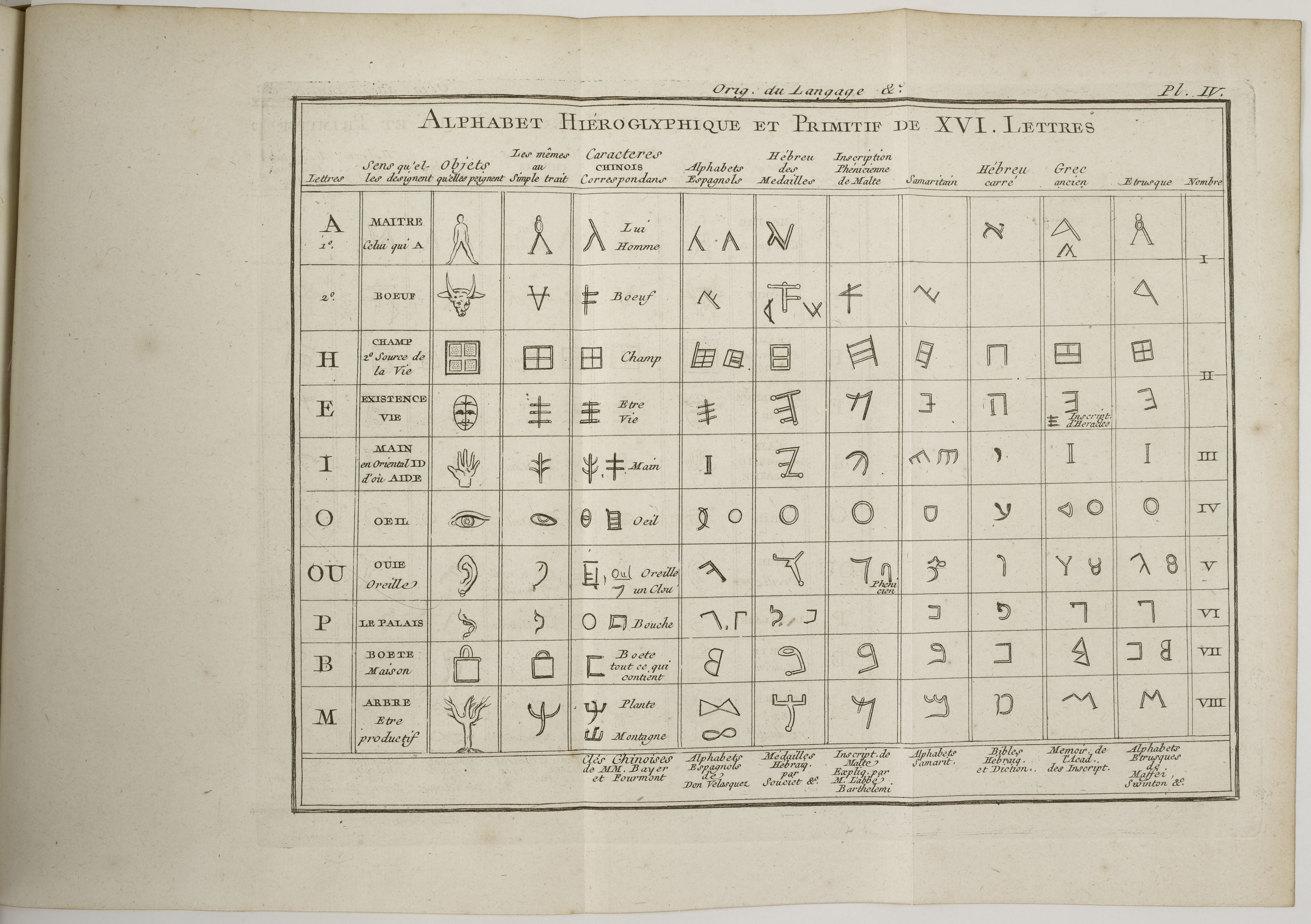
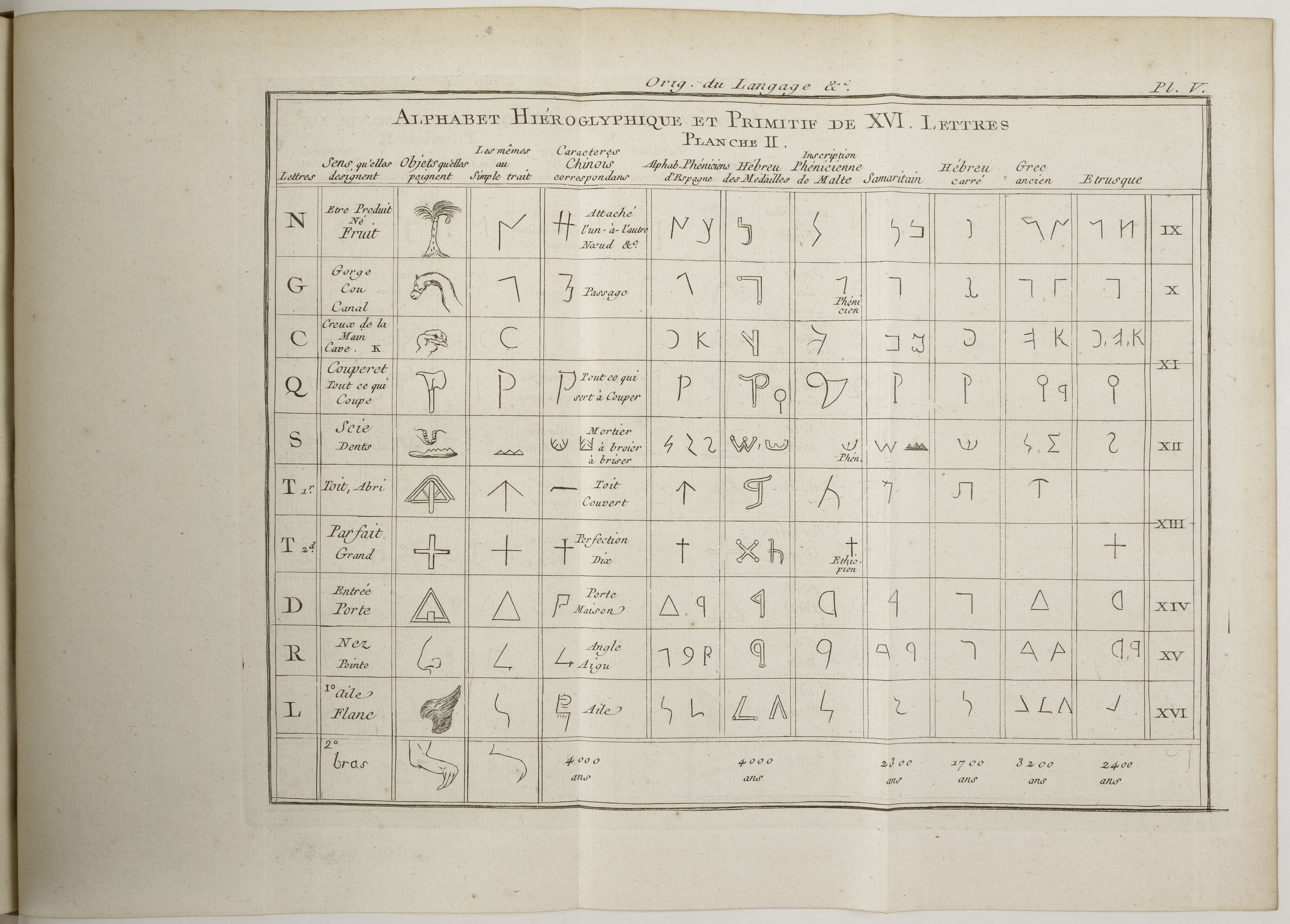
"Hermeneutic delirium" on the primitive words of a letter by Court de Gébelin

For Court de Gébelin, a proponent of the existence of a mimetic mother tongue, word "A" exemplifies a "primitive" word in the "plan général" of the Monde primitif published in 1773. The author provides the article "A" as an example of his project and explains its meaning as "designating property, possession". Anne-Marie Mercier-Faivre notes that this word, "in a very astonishing way installs the alphabet in myth".

It should come as no surprise, for Gébelin:

"that the word A is at the head of the words: placed at the highest degree of the vowel scale, it dominates among them like a monarch among his subjects. Being the most sonorous, it is the first to be distinguished in the most sensitive manner: & it is from these physical qualities which are proper to it & which characterize it that we shall see all the meanings with which it has been clothed born.".

According to Gébelin, all writing is "hieroglyphic," i.e. "made up of pure picto-ideograms." Consequently, "alphabetic writing is hieroglyphic [...], each letter being the painting of an object". However, Genette notes that this does not imply the alphabet directly represents sounds.

"The letter-ideogram paints an object to the eyes; the phoneme, which for [Gébelin] is a true ideophone, paints that same object to the ears - and the resemblance between these two portraits results only from their equal fidelity to their common model.".

Philologist Antoine Fabre d'Olivet, a contemporary of Gébelin and influenced by him, believes that the one-letter word represents "a simple, non-compounded, non-complex thing, such as a single-stranded rope."

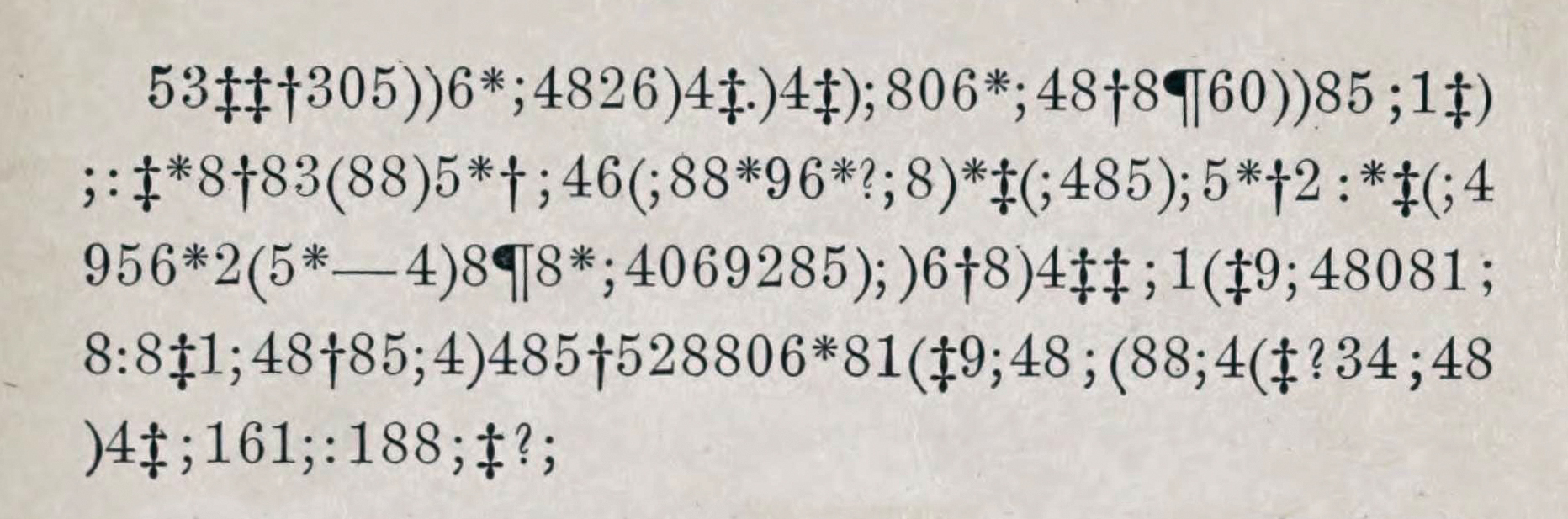
The Gold-Bug cryptogram, which has no spaces

In another register, the words of a letter can be a key to the analysis of a text or language. Edgar Allan Poe, in The Gold-Bug, as a prelude to the exposition of a method using frequency analysis, underlines the status of the words of a letter as a cryptological key when the spacing of the original text is preserved, which is not the case for the cryptogram of his short story:

"If there had been spaces, the task would have been singularly easier. In that case, I would have started by collating and analyzing the shortest words, and, if I had found, as is always likely, a single-letter word, a or I (un, je) for example, I would have considered the solution assured". (Note: Poe underlines the consubstantiality of the single-letter word and typographic space.)

It was thanks to such a word that Charles Virolleaud succeeded in 1929 in deciphering the Ugaritic alphabet, (the L in this alphabet) expressing the possessive preposition as in Hebrew and Arabic.

=== In dictionaries ===
Due to the polysemy of one-letter words, crossword puzzles and dictionaries often do not include specific definitions. Linguists Yannick Marchand and Robert Damper also note the absence of the word "A" from the lexical database they rely on, taken from an edition of Webster's English dictionary. (Note: Marchand and Damper's article deals with pronunciation by analogy in the context of speech recognition. They exploit a lexical database compiled by Terrence Sejnowski and Charles Rosenberg from the publicly available 1974 edition of the Pocket Webster Dictionary.) On the other hand, as T. A. Hall, the same work devotes different entries to "'D" (as in I'd) and "D'" (as in d'you know); to "'S" (as in he's) and "S'" (as in the girls' toys); to "'T" (as in 'twill do) and "T'" (as in t'other). This remark allows him to refute the claim — regarded as minor by some authors— that all one-letter words are palindromes: "these Webster entries are not palindromic, (Note: While all words in a non-diacritical letter are palindromes in themselves, and in this sense "A letter is its own mirror", as Frédéric Forte observes, on the other hand, as Jacques André observes, "few labor characters are symmetrical [...] even an 'o' is rarely circular".) since reading from right to left does not produce the same word as reading from left to right".

Craig Conley has devoted a 232-page reference book to one-letter words, One-Letter Words: a Dictionary, in which he counts over a thousand different meanings for English one-letter words, which leads him to emphasize the importance of context in understanding these words. For example, he lists 76 meanings of the word "X", to which he says he has a particular affection, including 17 in the "texts and proverbs" section, three in the "cards, spirits, and adult films" section, eight in the "on parchment paper" section, 15 in the "crosswords" section, five in the "Dr/Mr/Mrs/Miss X" section, 11 in the "scientific subjects" section, eight in the "mathematics" section, three in the "foreign meanings" section, eight in the "miscellaneous" section, and two in the "facts and figures" section. According to him, the only other work on the subject is a dictionary of one-letter words in Pali, compiled by the sixteenth-century Buddhist lexicographer Saddhammakitti and entitled Ekakkharakosa.

English lexicographer Jonathon Green, a specialist in the English slang language, has compiled a large number of one-letter word meanings in English, most of which do not appear in Conley's dictionary. The following table compares the number of meanings given to English one-letter words by these two lexicographers.

Number of meanings of one-letter words in English
	A	B	C	D	E	F	G	H	I	J	K	L	M	N	O	P	Q	R	S	T	U	V	W	X	Y	Z
According to Conley	52	40	42	44	41	31	34	28	45	24	40	31	27	27	63	24	27	30	36	58	32	51	18	76	45	35
According to Green	4	13	4	9	1	5	7	1	2	2	2	4	1	2	1	5	5	1	2	1	1	11	3	10	1	5

The incipit of Craig Conley's dictionary is the reminder of the White Queen's words to Alice:

"I'll tell you a secret... I can read words with only one letter! Isn't that wonderful? But don't be discouraged. You'll get there, too, after a while.".

This evocation of Lewis Carroll's text is all the more appropriate to the challenge of a dictionary of the words of a letter, since the description of the meaning of these words must include meanings that are not only nominative, i.e. relative to the use of language in general, but also stipulative, i.e. decided by an author in a particular context, as Humpty-Dumpty emphasizes to Alice:

"When I use a word," replied Humpty-Dumpty in a somewhat disdainful tone of voice, "it means exactly what I like it to mean... no more and no less."

"The question," said Alice, "is whether you have the power to make words mean something other than what they mean."

"The question," retorted Humpty-Dumpty, "is who will be the master... period."

=== In practice ===
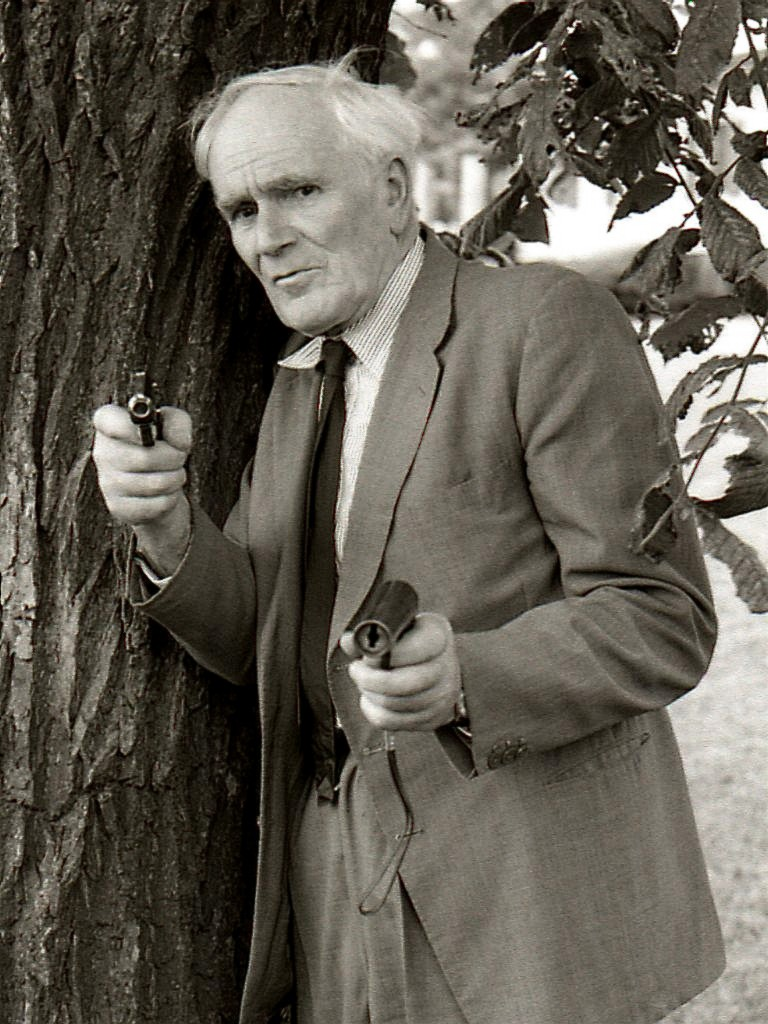
Q, a James Bond character

Jack Goody believes that the written word "adds an important dimension to many social actions." In this respect, the words of a letter can be divisive. In legal terms, their use in patronymics has sometimes been invalidated. In the United States, a woman was refused permission to change her name to R, on the grounds that there must be "some form of systematic standardization of individual identification in our society," a decision that was upheld on appeal to avoid "insurmountable difficulties"; a Korean named O, fed up with the difficulties he encountered with the computer programs of certain organizations not designed for names as short as his, (Note: On the other hand, it was precisely the computer constraints encountered by Margaret Oakley Dayhoff that justified the adoption of one-letter names for amino acids) had to change it to Oh. (Note: The name O, of Korean origin, is the most common one-letter name in the United States.) In Sweden, a couple who wanted to name their son Q, in homage to the character of the same name in the James Bond series, were refused both at first instance and on appeal, on the grounds that the first name was "inappropriate;" however, the Supreme Administrative Court overturned these decisions, ruling that it had not been "proven that the name Q could be offensive or that it could cause embarrassment to its bearer." In New Zealand, the first name J was invalidated six times between 2001 and 2013. On the other hand, it was on joining the US Air Force that singer Johnny Cash, born J. R. Cash, changed his first names to John and Ray to comply with military requirements.

Some notable pinyin Es

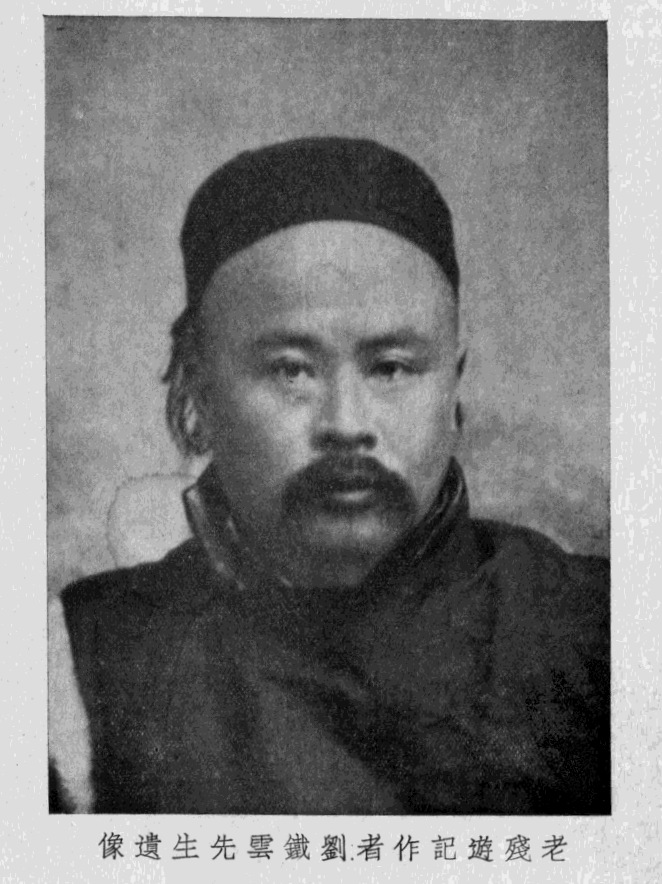
Liu E

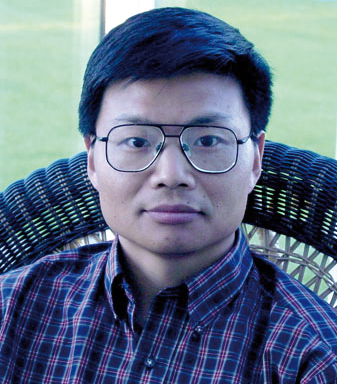
Weinan E

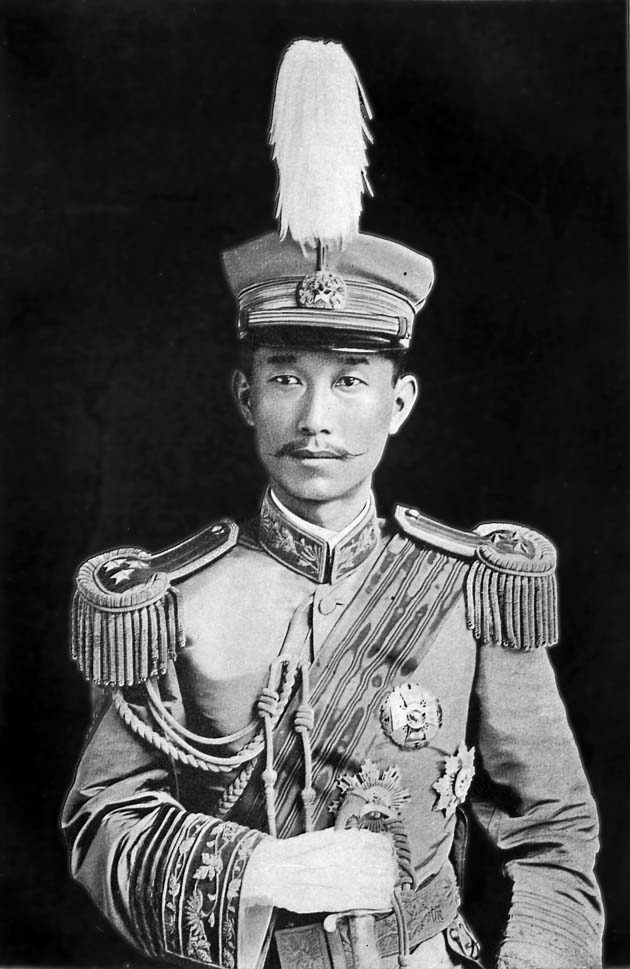
Cai E

A notable example of the social impact of choosing a one-letter surname is the case of American preacher Malcolm Little, who decided in 1952 to adopt the surname X, on the premise that Little was the name of a slave owner rather than his African ancestors. The Nation of Islam movement eventually asked its new members to renounce their "slave name" and adopt the same patronymic, creating such confusion that they were obliged to add a serial number before the letter X: one of Malcolm X's drivers, Charles Morris, called himself Charles 37X, the 37th Charles to have his name changed in the same temple. According to some authors, this political practice also contributed to the choice of the letter X to designate a generation.

Georges Perec underlines the special status of X: "this letter that has become a word, this noun that is unique in the language in having only one letter, unique also in that it is the only one to have the shape of what it designates. (Note: Véronique Montémont observes that the title ∈ "has no stable phonic equivalent" and can be read in several ways: Ensembles, Appartient à, Eu, Signe d'appartenance. Jacques Roubaud, who himself calls this work Euh, is particularly pleased about this: "In principle, my title is unpronounceable [...] [J'en] tire une satisfaction puérile qui n'arrange pas ma réputation". Véronique Montémont nevertheless emphasizes the symbolic significance of this choice, "which places the work [...] under the double seal of literature [...] and mathematics".)

In other cases, on the contrary, social norms justify the use of one-letter words. For example, the use of a single letter for the middle name, perceived as valorizing, is sometimes accepted, e.g. S for President Truman, and sometimes criticized, e.g. V for English politician Grant Shapps. Mathematician Benoît Mandelbrot readily admits to adding a B after his first name, a choice attributed to a mathematical joke about recursivity. Joanne Rowling attributes the addition of an unjustified K to her first name to her publisher, who was keen to attract a readership of young boys. In Myanmar, the word U, meaning uncle, is added in front of the surname as a mark of the notoriety enjoyed, for example, by U Nu, U Pandita or U Thant.

In certain fields, such as tickers, stock market mnemonics or domain names, their brevity and rarity lend them prestige. The one-letter word can also be a form of euphemism to avoid the use of a shocking word.

One-letter words are also used extensively in SMS, particularly when the sound value of the letter is used, such as "g" for "j'ai" (in French) or "c" for "c'est" (in French); or "u" for "you" (in English), "r" for "are" (in English) or "c" for "see" (in English). However, diacritical letters are coded differently from one manufacturer to another, because, for example: â, ë and ç cannot all be used at the same time within the 160-character limit, which makes the billing of messages containing them uncertain. Among Japanese youth, 了解/りょうかい (ryōkai, "understand"/"ok") is shortened to りょ (ryo) and again to り (ri).

== In literature ==
=== Work titles ===
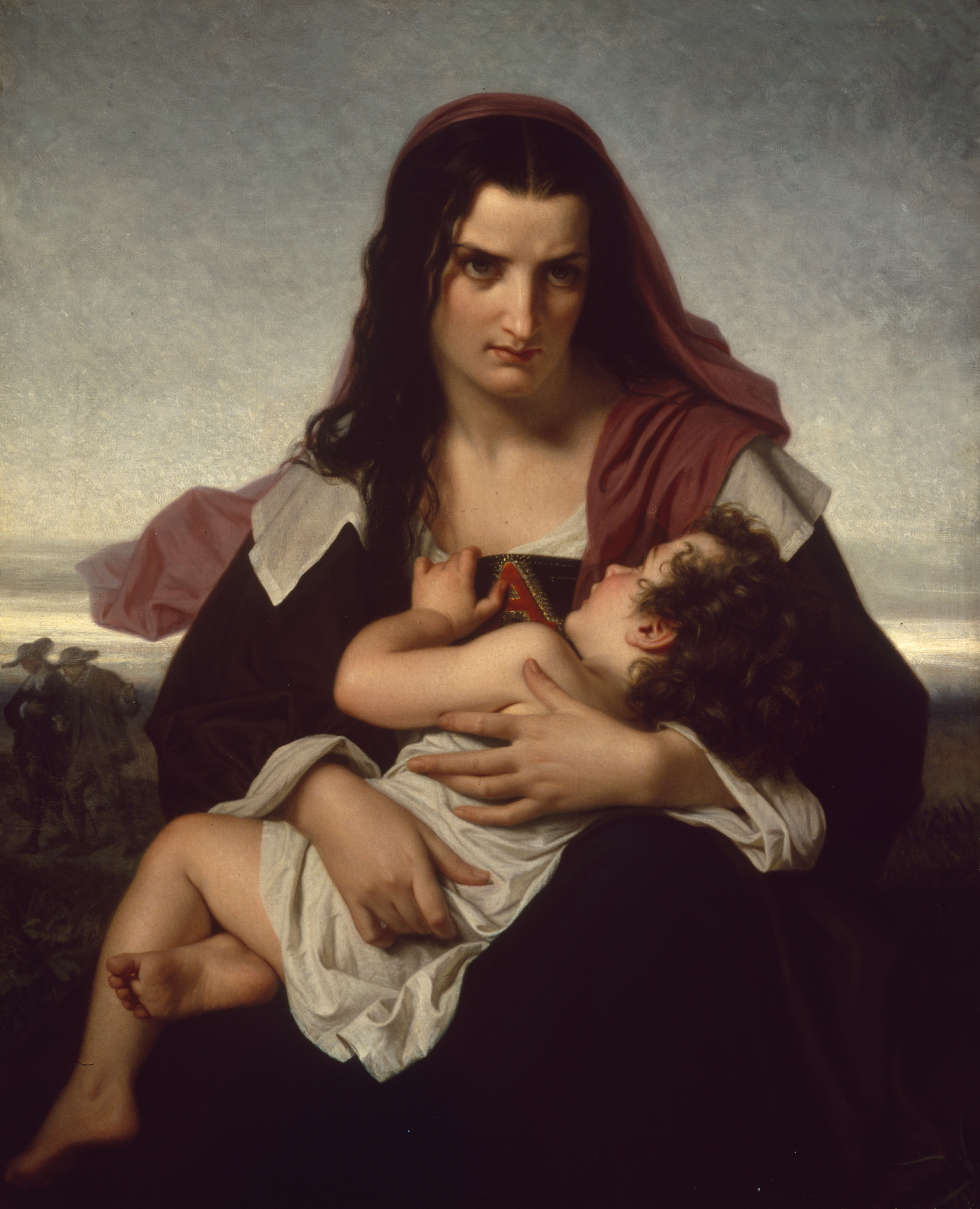
The Scarlet Letter, which features the letter A with a variable meaning

A character in James Joyce's Ulysses speaks of books yet to be written:

"You were bowing to the mirror, stepping forward, taking the applause, serious as a pope, very striking face. Hurray for the Sunday moron! Rra! No one would notice: you didn't tell anyone. The books you were going to write with letters as titles. Did you read his F? Oh yes, but I prefer Q. Of course, but W is magnificent. Ah yes, W."

Unbeknownst to Joyce, F would be written by Daniel Kehlmann in 2013, Q under the collective pseudonym Luther Blissett in 1999, and Georges Perec's W, published in 1975, would describe a country "where sport and life merge in the same magnificent effort."

Other literary works with one-letter titles include: A by Louis Zukofsky, G. by John Berger, H by Philippe Sollers, N. by Stephen King, R by Céline Minard, S by John Updike, V. by Thomas Pynchon and Z by Vassílis Vassilikós. Jacques Roubaud also titled one of his books ∈, this mathematical symbol of belonging being for him "by extension, a symbol of belonging to the world." (Note: According to Jack Goody, this characteristic of X is evidence of the "logographic" origin of the alphabet: "the sign we write X, and which we use to mean 'cross', refers, in addition to the sound we associate with it, to a concept, an object and an action".)

Several films also have a single-letter title, such as Alexandre Arcady's K, Oliver Stone's W., Fritz Lang's M and its 1951 remake by Joseph Losey, or Costa-Gavras' Z, based on the novel of the same name. (Note: One-letter words are also used to categorize films according to their intended audience. At the end of the 1930s, the British Board of Film Classification introduced a new category, "H" (Horrific), for horror films, alongside "U" (Universal), for all audiences, and "A" (Adult), for adults. The Motion Picture Association of America's film classification system, instituted in 1968, distinguishes between "X" and "pornographic" films, "G" (General) films for all audiences, including children, "M" (Mature) films for all audiences but with parental consent for children, and "R" (Restricted) films, forbidden to children under 17 if unaccompanied. In India, the Central Board of Film Certification distinguishes between "U" (Unrestricted Public Exhibition) films for all audiences, "A" (Adults) films for adults only, and "S" (Special class of persons) films for specialized audiences, such as doctors or engineers.)

=== Poetic experiences ===
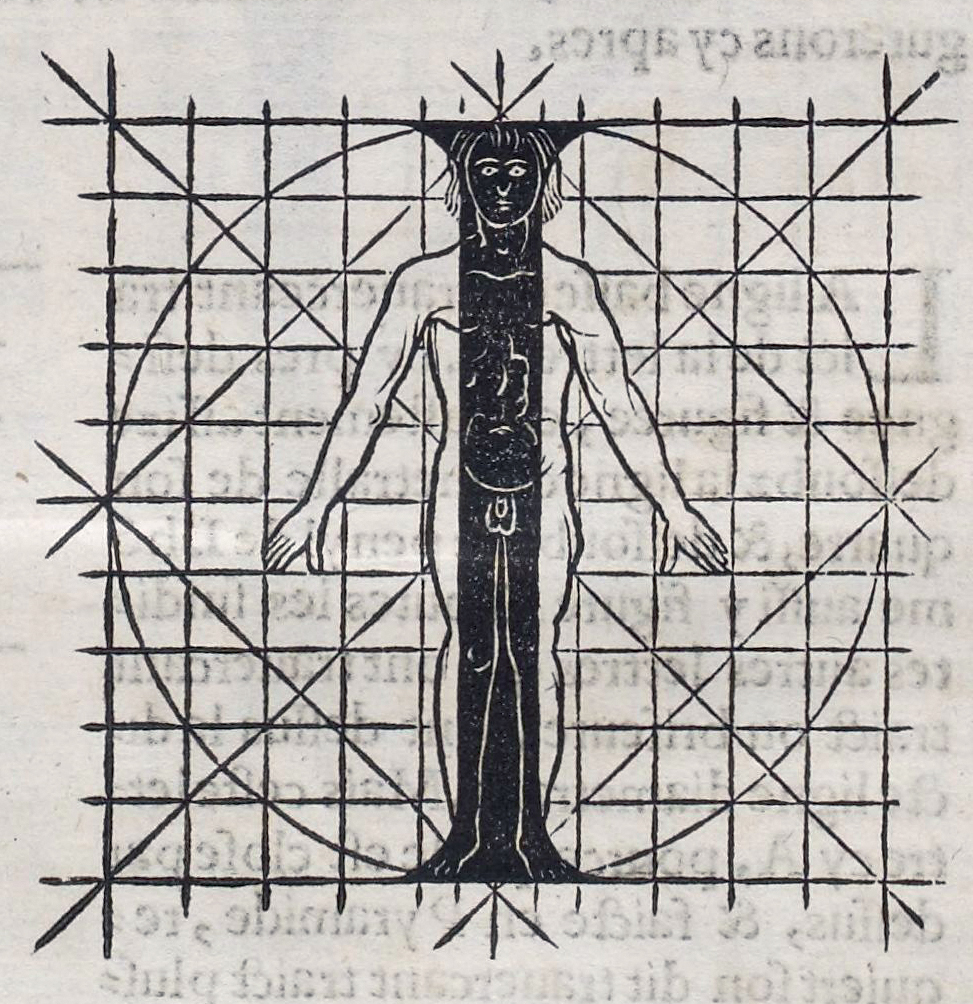
Anthropomorphism of the I in Geoffroy Tory

Several writers, such as Victor Hugo, Paul Claudel and Francis Ponge, have taken an interest in the letter as ideomimography. Various one-letter poems have prompted exegesis on their semantic value and whether or not they are words. This is particularly true of works by Russian poets of the futurist Zaum movement, including Vasilisk Gnedov, Aleksej Kručënyx and Ilia Zdanevich. American minimalist poet Aram Saroyan is the author of Untitled poster-poem, a poem consisting of an m with four legs, which Bob Grumman places "at the center of an alphabet in formation, between the m and the n," cited by the Guinness Book of Records as the world's shortest poem. (Note: The Guinness Book of World Records stopped publishing such records in 2012, arguing that "the mere fact of competing for the title of 'shortest' was in itself a trivialization of the activity concerned".) Translating into English the concrete poem Ich by Vladimír Burda, composed of the German word "Ich" (I in German) topped by his fingerprint, Canadian poet John Curry reduces it to "i" (I in English) formed from the shaft of an "i" topped by a dot-shaped fingerprint.

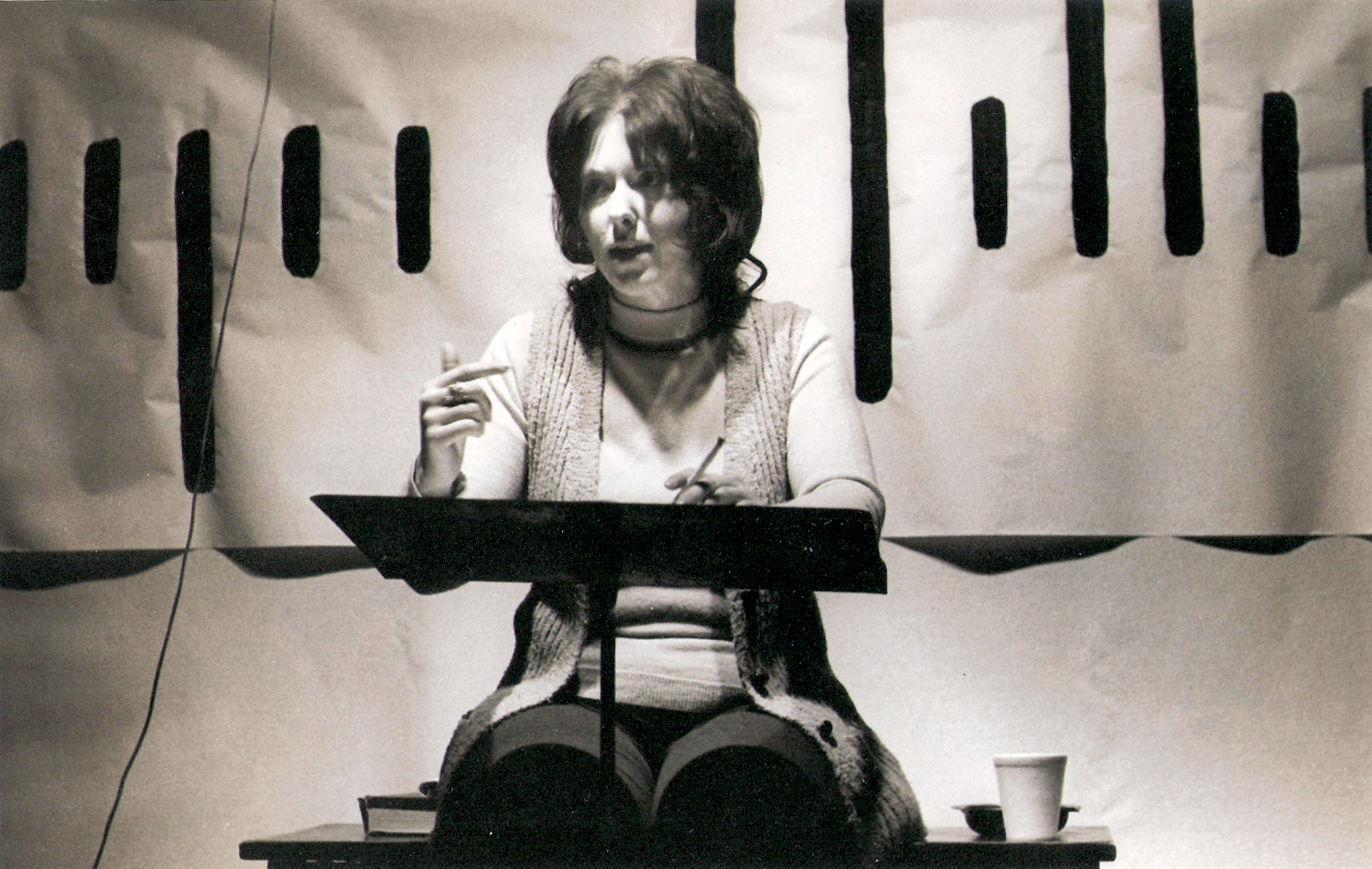
"Joyce Holland"

American poet Dave Morice estimated that English allows only fifty-two one-letter words: twenty-six upper case and twenty-six lower case. He also indulged in a literary experiment in the 1970s, inventing a female "alter ego", Joyce Holland, a minimalist poet played by his partner, P. J. Casteel, whose existence was acknowledged even by The New York Times. She published 13 issues of Matchbook, a magazine of one-word poems stapled to matchbooks and sold for 5 cents. In 1973, in Alphabet Anthology, Joyce Holland collected one-letter poems chosen for the occasion by 104 American poets, including Bruce Andrews ("o"), Larry Eigner ("e") and Bernadette Mayer ("n"). Joyce Holland had sent them a postcard featuring all 26 letters of the alphabet, in lower case, asking them to circle the letter of their choice and send it back to her. The letter O was the most chosen (12), followed by A and G (8); nobody chose V, and one contributor preferred to add a Þ.

=== Oulipo and one-letter poetry ===
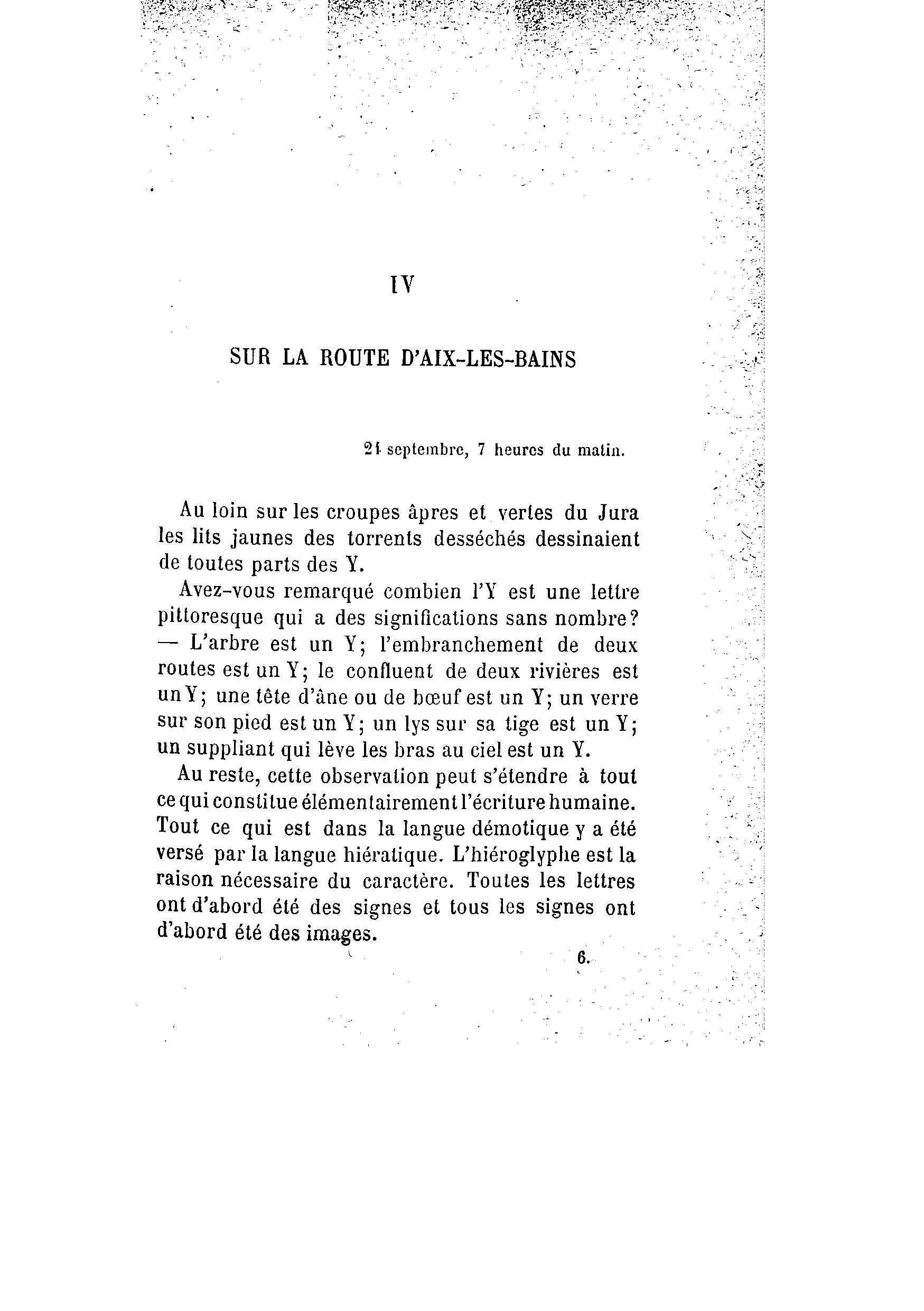
Victor Hugo research on the letter (Note: Marc Lapprand notes Perec's interest in ideomimography. He gives as an example "the transformations [he] made to the W [...] successively into a swastika, an SS acronym, and even [into] the Jewish star (W ou le souvenir d'enfance, p. 106)". Hervé Le Tellier, for his part, points out that several Oulipiens are interested in a "formal remotivation of the letter".)

One-letter words play a role in the Oulipian constraint, a form of rhopalic verse in which the first line consists of a one-letter word. But above all, they are the subject of a notable experiment by François Le Lionnais, dating from 1957 and published in La Littérature potentielle in 1973, of "Réduction d'un poème à une seule lettre". The poem was formulated as "T." On the following page, he comments:

"I'm afraid that reducing a poem to a single letter is on the other side of permissible literature. But we can have fun, can't we? In any case, the author didn't want to repeat this performance. He left it to 25 of his colleagues to put together the complete set of 26 poems based - from the Latin alphabet - on this principle."

This short poem has been the subject of "formidable glosses" within the Oulipo.

In Écrits français, Harry Mathews attempts a "textual explanation." He observes that "the only letter in the poem [...] is not a letter by itself, but a letter followed by a period. Punctuation transforms what would otherwise be a sufficient if mysterious entity into an abbreviation." According to Harry Mathews, this is in fact a reduction of a device comparable to Raymond Queneau's Hundred Thousand Billion Poems. He designed, on the principle of perpetual motion, that the following sentence would be inscribed on the front and back of a page: "J'ai inventé le mouvement perpétuel T.S.V.P." (I invented perpetual motion T.S.V.P.). Bénabou then proceeded to make successive reductions, eventually inscribing only "T." on one side of a page.

In 2006, Marcel Bénabou resumed his analysis of the poem in Miniature persane. While praising Harry Mathews' "learned commentary" on the point, he considers that "there is nothing to prevent from thinking that it could be [...] a period" and that "in the author's mind, there is a hesitation as to the exact nature of his 'attempt' and of the 'work' to which said attempt has led". For Bénabou, the choice of the letter T is explained primarily by personal reasons, but also by the characteristics of this consonant, which is at once homophonic, polyphonic and polysemous. Bénabou observes, however, that Le Lionnais "doesn't seem to have taken any notice" of the "properly oral" dimension of the one-letter word, and in this connection evokes an "oulipien debate" for which Jacques Bens proposed I, which should read "un en chiffre romain et en garamond gras" or "one in Roman numerals and in bold garamond," as it were. (Note: Hervé Le Tellier notes a variant also attributed to Jacques Bens: a, which should read "petit a en romain et en garamond gras" and notes the proximity of the rebus.) Finally, Bénabou recalls an anecdote told by Jean-Jacques Rousseau in his Confessions:

"I read that a wise bishop on a tour of his diocese found an old woman who for all her prayers knew only how to say O. He said to her: Good mother, keep praying always like that; your prayer is better than ours". (Note: The lesson cited by Marcel Bénabou is not universally accepted, with publishers and typographers hesitating over this letter. While "O" is the most common spelling, some editions give "Oh". The reference edition by Bernard Gagnebin and Marcel Raymond gives "Ô".)

He believes that the reader should also assure Le Lionnais that his poem is worth more than he thinks, as it "in no way leads to a dead end, but on the contrary to fantastic enrichment."

In 2007, Jacques Jouet finally responded to Le Lionnais' call, asking his Oulipo colleagues to "renew the gesture" by composing their own reduction. Among the responses, François Caradec proposed reducing Un coup de dés jamais n'abolira le hasard to "D." Michelle Grangaud, to reduce ruelle to "L." Paul Fournel, "for strictly personal, emotional reasons," saw no other possibility than "T." Olivier Salon reduced his poem to "P." Oskar Pastior, after a quantitative analysis of Charles Baudelaire's Harmonie du soir, reduces it to "L." Anne F. Garréta proposed a prose narrative: "J." Harry Mathews, "K." both because this letter, like himself, "is only imperfectly integrated into the modern French language", and because it is "composed of three sticks," allowing it to be rearranged in order to construct twelve other letters. (Note: Harry Mathews specifies: "with the three sticks, A, F, H, N, Z; with one or two, I, L, T, V, X, Y".)

== See also ==
- Acronym
- fr:Boule de neige (Oulipo)
- Craig Brown (satirist)
- Cratylism
- List of short place names
- Monogram
- fr:Symbolisme des lettres

== Bibliography ==
- ^{(fr)} Antoine Arnauld and Claude Lancelot, Grammaire générale et raisonnée, Le Petit, 1660 (read online archive).
- ^{(fr)} Marcel Bénabou, La Miniature persane, vol. 153, coll. "La Bibliothèque oulipienne", 2006.
- ^{(fr)} Lewis Carroll (trad. Henri Parisot), De l'autre côté du miroir et ce qu'Alice y trouva, Robert Laffont, coll. "Bouquins", 2003.
- Craig Conley, One-Letter Words: A Dictionary, Harper Collins, 2005.
- ^{(fr)} Gérard Genette, Mimologiques, Le Seuil, coll. "Points", 1976.
- ^{(fr)} Hervé Le Tellier, Esthétique de l'Oulipo, Le Castor astral, 2006.
- ^{(fr)} Oulipo, D'une seule lettre, vol. 165, coll. "La Bibliothèque oulipienne", 2007.
