= La Bibliothèque oulipienne =

La Bibliothèque oulipienne is a collection that hosts the works of the individual and collective members of the Oulipo. The short texts that compose them form a fabric of playful literary creations.

This publication is limited to 150 numbered copies (plus the 50 reserved for members), but these volumes are regularly compiled in volume, at Éditions Seghers, then at Le Castor astral.

== List of booklets ==
VOLUME I (Seghers)

- 1. Georges Perec: Ulcérations
- 2. Jacques Roubaud: La princesse Hoppy ou Le conte du Labrador
- 3. Raymond Queneau: Les Fondements de la Littérature d’après David Hilbert
- 4. Collective: À Raymond Queneau
- 5. Harry Mathews: Le Savoir des Rois
- 6. Italo Calvino: Piccolo Sillabario Illustrato
- 7. Jacques Roubaud: La princesse Hoppy ou Le conte du Labrador. Chapitre 2: Myrtilles et Béryl
- 8. Paul Fournel: Élémentaire moral
- 9. Paul Braffort: Mes Hypertropes
- 10. Paul Fournel & Jacques Roubaud: L’Hôtel de Sens
- 11. Jacques Bens: Rendez-vous chez François
- 12. Noël Arnaud: Souvenirs d’un Vieil Oulipien
- 13. Marcel Bénabou: Un aphorisme peut en cacher un autre
- 14. Jacques Duchateau: Les sept coups du tireur à la ligne en apocalypse lent, occupé à lire « Monnaie de singe » de William Faulkner
- 15. Jacques Roubaud: Io et le Loup
- 16. Claude Burgelin, Paul Fournel, Béatrice de Jurquet, Harry Mathews, Georges Perec, Jacques Bens: La Cantatrice Sauve
- 17. Jacques Duchateau: Sanctuaire à tiroirs
- 18. Paul Braffort: Le désir (les désirs) dans l’ordre des amours

VOLUME II (Seghers)

- 19. Georges Perec: Épithalames
- 20. Italo Calvino: Comment j’ai écrit un de mes livres
- 21. Michèle Métail: Portraits-Robots
- 22. Claude Berge: La Princesse aztèque
- 23. Collective: À Georges Perec
- 24. Jean Queval: ,: ! ? ! ? !()[]
- 25. Marcel Bénabou: Locutions introuvables
- 26. Jacques Roubaud: Le train traverse la nuit
- 27. Luc Étienne: L’art du palindrome phonétique
- 28. Jacques Jouet: L’Eclipse
- 29. Marcel Bénabou: Alexandre au greffoir
- 30. François Le Lionnais: Troisième manifeste de l'Oulipo.
- 31. Jean Queval: Insecte contemplant la préhistoire
- 32. Jean Queval: Ecrits sur mesure
- 33. Michèle Métail: Cinquante poèmes corpusculaires
- 34. Michèle Métail: Filigranes
- 35. Michèle Métail: Cinquante poèmes oscillatoires
- 36. Jean Lescure: Ultra crepidam
- 37. François Caradec: Fromage ou dessert ?

VOLUME III (Seghers)

- 38. Jacques Jouet: L’oulipien démasqué
- 39. Michèle Métail: Petit atlas géo-homophonique des départements de le France métropolitaine et d’outre-mer
- 40. Marcel Bénabou: Bris de mots
- 41. Jacques Roubaud: Vers une oulipisation conséquente de la littérature
- 42. Noël Arnaud: Le dernier compte rendu
- 43. Jacques Roubaud: Secondes litanies de la Vierge
- 44. Jacques Jouet: Espions
- 45. François Caradec: La voie du troisième secteur
- 46. Paul Fournel: Banlieue
- 47. Jacques Roubaud: La disposition numérologique du rerum vulgarium fragmenta, précédé d’une vie brève de François Pétrarque
- 48. Paul Braffort: Les bibliothèques invisibles
- 49. François Caradec: Veuillez trouver ci-inclus
- 50. Michèle Métail: Cinquante poèmes oligogrammes
- 51. Harry Mathews: Écrits français
- 52. Jacques Jouet: Les sept règles de Perec

VOLUME IV (Le Castor Astral)

- 53. Jacques Roubaud: Le voyage d’hier
- 54. Collective: S+7, le retour
- 55. Collective: Autre morales élémentaires
- 56. Jacques Jouet: Glose de la Comtesse de Die et de Didon
- 57. Harry Mathews: Une soirée oulipienne
- 58. Paul Braffort: Trente-quatre brazzles
- 59. Marcel Bénabou: Rendre à Cézanne
- 60. François Caradec: 105 proverbes liftés, suivis de quelques poèmes soldés
- 61. Jacques Roubaud: Crise de théâtre
- 62. Le chant d’amour grand-singe, un corpus lyrique méconnu, collected, translated and commented by Jacques Jouet

VOLUME V (Le Castor Astral)

- 63. Noël Arnaud: Gérard Genette et l’OULIPO
- 64. Jacques Jouet & Jacques Roubaud: [e]
- 65. Collective: N-ines, autrement dit quenines
- 66. Jacques Roubaud: N-ine, autrement dit quenine (encore)
- 67. Claude Berge: Qui a tué le Duc de Densmore ?
- 68. Collective: Troll de tram (Le tramway de Strasbourg)
- 69. Jacques Duchateau: Le cordon de Saint-François (nouvelle sans fin)
- 70. Harry Mathews: À l’œil
- 71. Collective: Bibliothèques invisibles, toujours
- 72. Jacques Jouet: Monostication de La Fontaine
- 73. Oskar Pastior: Spielregel, Wildwuchs, Translation (Règle du jeu, Ulcérations, Translations)

VOLUME VI (Le Castor Astral)

- 74. Hervé Le Tellier: Mille pensées (premiers cents)
- 75. Michelle Grangaud: Formes de l’anagramme
- 76. Michelle Grangaud: D’une petite haie, si possible belle, aux Regrets
- 77. Hervé Le Tellier: A bas Carmen
- 78. Jacques Jouet: Une chambre close
- 79. Collective: La guirlande de Paul
- 80. Jacques Bens: L’art de la fuite
- 81. Jacques Roubaud: Trois ruminations
- 82. Jacques Jouet: Exercices de la mémoire
- 83. Jacques Roubaud: La terre est plate
- 84. Hervé Le Tellier: Un sourire indéfinissable
- 85. François Le Lionnais: Un certain disparate (fragments)

Volume VII (Le Castor Astral)

- 86. Walter Henry: Chu dans mer sale, ou la rumination polymorphe
- 87. Marcel Bénabou: L’Hannibal perdu
- 88. Jacques Bens: J’ai oublié
- 89. Claude Berge: Raymond Queneau et la combinatoire
- 90. Collective: Sexe: ce xé
- 91. Georges Perec, Harry Mathews, Oskar Pastior: Variations, Variations, Variationen
- 92. Harry Mathews: Un chronogramme pour 1997
- 93. Jacques Jouet: Pauline (polyne)
- 94. Hervé Le Tellier: Le vent de la langue
- 95. Michelle Grangaud: Oulipo fondu
- 96. François Caradec: Paris périphérique, suivi d’autres petits poèmes parisiens
- 97. Jacques Jouet et Pierre Rosenstiehl: Frise du métro parisien
- 98. Jacques Roubaud: Ô baobab
- 99. Paul Fournel: Foyer-jardin, théâtre

Volume VIII (Le Castor astral)

- 100. Collective: Ceci est mon cent (spécial Dieu)
- 101. Michelle Grangaud: hahaôahah
- 102. Ian Monk: Fractales
- 103. Marcel Bénabou: Altitude et profondeur
- 104. Jacques Bens: Opus posthume
- 105. Hervé Le Tellier: Le voyage d’Hitler
- 106. Collective: La couronne de Stèphe
- 107. Jacques Jouet: La redonde
- 108. Jacques Jouet: Hinterreise et autres histoires retournées
- 109. Ian Monk: Monquines
- 110.[Ian Monk]: Le voyage d’Hoover
- 111. Harry Mathews: Sainte Catherine
- 112. Jacques Bens: Le voyage d’Arvers
- 113. Michelle Grangaud: Un voyage divergent

Fascicules suivants:

- 114. François Caradec: Le voyage du ver
- 115. Michelle Grangaud: Une bibliothèque en avion
- 116. Ian Monk: Les états du sonnet
- 117. Reine Haugure: le voyage du vers
- 118. Harry Mathews: Le voyage des verres
- 119. Paul Braffort: Cinq lettres de créance
- 120. Jacques Jouet & Olivier Salon: Pas de deux
- 121. Collective: Aux origines du langage
- 122. François Caradec: Que j’aime à faire apprendre au pi-éton de Paris
- 123. Collective: Drames et comédies brefs dans le petit lavoir
- 124. Jacques Jouet: Vies longues
- 125. Collective: Doukipleudonktan ?
- 126. Oskar Pastior: « sestinenformulate » modengraphik und minisestinen
- 127. Ian Monk: Quenoums
- 128. Ian Monk: Élémentaire, mon cher
- 129. Mikhaïl Gorliouk: Si par une nuit un voyage d’hiver
- 130. Paul Braffort: Les univers bibliothèques
- 131. Jacques Roubaud: Duchamp l’Oulipien
- 132. Olivier Salon: Les gens de légende
- 133. Marcel Bénabou: La mort mode d’emploi
- 134. Jacques Jouet: Petites boîtes, sonnets minces et autres rigueurs
- 135. Jacques Jouet: Du monostique
- 136. Marcel Bénabou: Petit supplément au Cratyle, 2006.
- 137. Collective: Et Dieu créa la femme du boulanger, 2006.
- 138. Paul Fournel: Les premières heures de la colonie, 2006.
- 139. Frédéric Forte: Le voyage des rêves, 2006.
- 140. Paul Fournel: La table de nain prolongée de quelques conséquences, 2006.
- 141. Collective: Des rats dans la Bibliothèque, 2006.
- 142. François Caradec: Complaintes des jeudis passés, 2006.
- 143. Jacques Jouet: Danaé (trentine), 2006.
- 144. Frédéric Forte: Tubes chinois 2006.
- 145. Collective: La circulaire nº 31 2006.
- 146. Jacques Roubaud & Olivier Salon: Sardinosaures & Cie, 2006.
- 147. Paul Fournel: Les animaux d'amour, 2006.
- 148. Collective: La fin des temps, 2006.
- 149. Jacques Roubaud & Olivier Salon: Nouvelles sollicitudes, 2006.
- 151. Paul Fournel: Romans, 2006.
- 152. Jacques Roubaud & Paul Fournel: Chicagos, 2006.
- 153. Marcel Bénabou: Miniature persane, 2006.
- 154. François Caradec: Dans l'Sperluette, 2006.
- 155. Jacques Roubaud: Cœurs, 2006.
- 156. Jacques Bens: Oulipolets, 2006.
- 157. Frédéric Forte, Jacques Jouet et Jacques Roubaud: Chronopoèmes, 2007.
- 158. Jacques Roubaud: Battement de Monge, 2007.
- 159. Anne F. Garréta: N-amor, 2007.
- 160. Anne F. Garréta & Valérie Beaudouin: Tu te souviens... ?, 2007.
- 161. Jacques Jouet: Du W., de Cortazar et de la Li Po, 2007.
- 162. Jacques Jouet: Le voyage du Grand Verre, 2007.
- 163. Paul Fournel: Terines, 2007.
- 164. Jacques Jouet: Rumination de l'essai oulipien, 2007.
- 165. Collective: D'une seule lettre, 2007.
- 166. Bernard Cerquiglini: Les saillies du Dragon, 2008.
- 167. Frédéric Forte: Petite morale élémentaire portative, 2008.
- 168. François Caradec: Dans l'S(uite), 2008.
- 169. Marcel Bénabou: Éthique simpliste, 2008.
- 170. Olivier Salon: Chaque porche est une invitation au voyage, 2008.
- 171. Ian Monk: Les feuilles de yucca, à paraître en 2009.
- 172. Jacques Jouet: Rumination des divergences, 2008.
- 173. François Caradec et alii: 99 poèmes voilés, 2008.
- 174. Jacques Roubaud: Les perplexités onomastiques d'Olivier salon, oulipien, dans les rues de Paris, 2008.
- 175. Collective: Autoportraits, 2009.
- 177. Michelle Grangaud: Millésimes, 2009.
- 178. Jacques Jouet: Un train traverse le jour, 2009.
- 179. Reine Haugure: Le voyage d'H... Ver...., 2008.
- 180. Daniel Levin Becker: Indices, 2009.
- 181. Ian Monk: La queninisation du yucca Vers une oulipisation universelle de la littérature Tome II, 2009.
- 182. Marcel Bénabou: Premier mai unitaire, 2010.
- 183. Jacques Roubaud: Botulisme et Oulipisme, 2009.
- 184. Marcel Bénabou: Saturations, 2010.
- 185. Michèle Audin: Carrés imparfaits, 2010.
- 186. Jacques Jouet: Le Paris de Caradec, 2010.
- 187. Frédéric Forte: 99 notes préparatoires aux notes préparatoires, 2010.
- 188. Ian Monk: Comment dire en anglais, 2010.
- 189. Jacques Jouet: Rumination du dialogue, 2010.
- 190. Hervé Le Tellier: Maître et disciple, 2011.
- 191. Michèle Audin: Sextines, encore, 2011.
- 192. Michelle Grangaud: Millésimes II, 2011.
- 193. Paul Fournel: A Lunel où sont les Fournel, 2011.
- 194. Jacques Roubaud: Sursonnet de Braffort-Heredia, 2011.
- 195. Collective: L'immigration expliquée à ma grand-mère et autres textes, 2012.
- 196. Olivier Salon: Urbanité du bivocalisme, 2012.
- 666. Collective: Diable !
