= Jeannine Dion-Guérin =

French writer and poet (1933–2025)

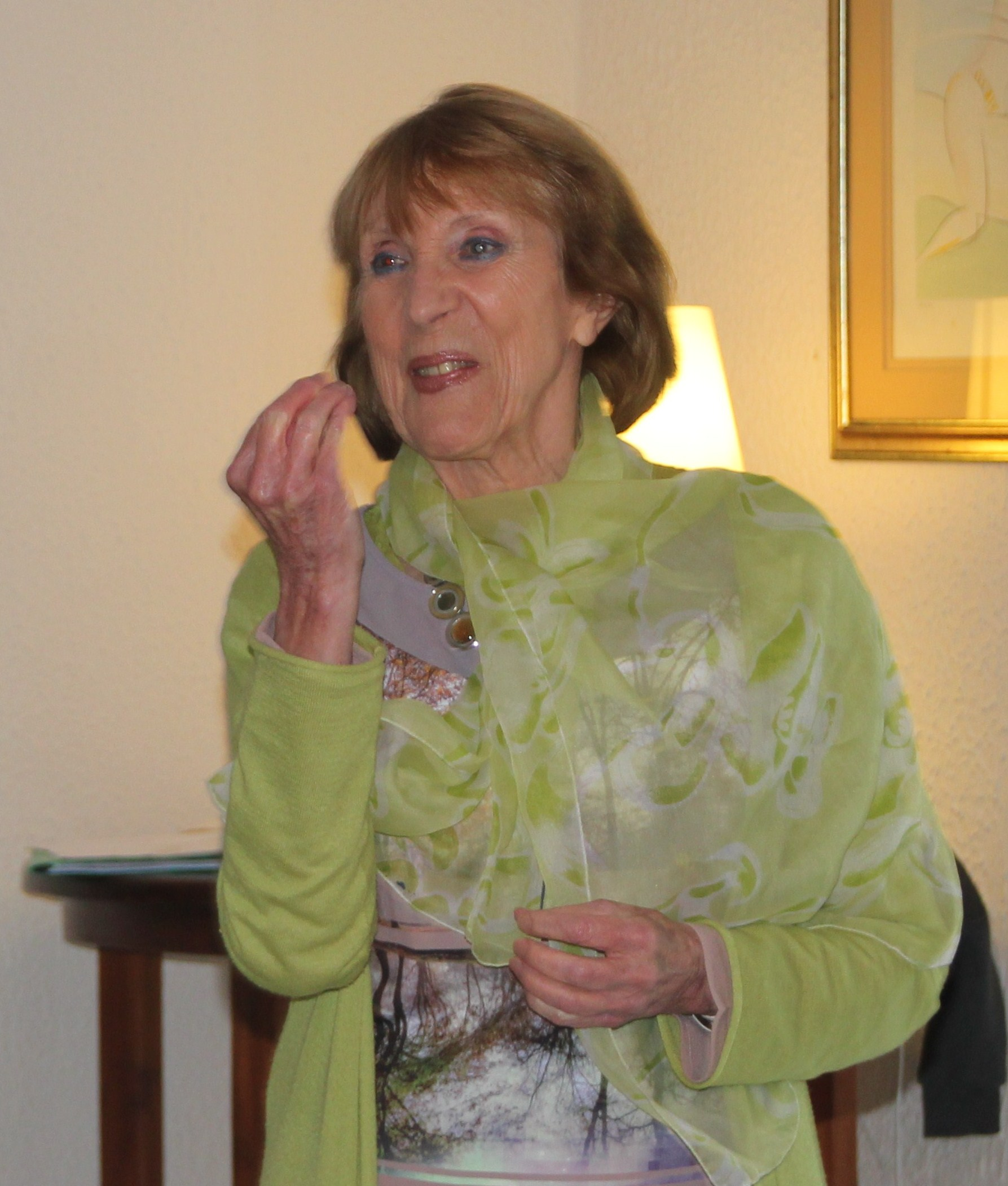
- Dion-Guérin in 2014
- Born: 8 June 1933; Sannois, France
- Died: 13 June 2025 (aged 92); Montmorency, France
- Occupations: Writer; poet

Jeannine Dion-Guérin (8 June 1933 – 13 June 2025) was a French writer and poet.

== Life and career ==
Born in Sannois on 8 June 1933, Dion-Guérin spent her career teaching at a nursery school in Frépillon. After her retirement, she devoted her life to poetry, theatre, and radio. She became a member of Oulipo after drawing inspiration from Georges Perec, as well as Jacques Roubaud, Jacques Bens, and Jacques Jouet. She cited Eugène Guillevic and Léopold Sédar Senghor as her favorite poets. She also hosted a radio show on IdFM Radio Enghien, where her guests included the likes of Michel Bénard, Maurice Lestieux, and Michel Verna. She also served as secretary-general of the Société des poètes français.

Dion-Guérin died in Montmorency on 13 June 2025, at the age of 92.

== Works ==
=== Biographies ===
- À l'ombre du baobab : rencontre du poète Léopold Sédar Senghor (2017)

=== Poetry ===
- Mélodie sous la mer
- L'Amande douce-amère (1985)
- Babirimes : jeux poétiques d'enfants d'école maternelle (1986)
- Le Sang des cailloux (1987)
- Éclats de soleil (1989)
- Le Tracé des sèves (1993)
- Mines de fond (1994)
- Brève la migration (1996)
- De chair et de lumière (1997)
- Jeux d'osselets (1998)
- Le Signe, quel signe ou Le guetteur immobile (2002)
- Le Tracé des sèves (2003)
- Sablier des métamorphoses (2005)
- Les Étoiles ne sont pas toutes dans le ciel (2007)
- L'Écho des nuits (2007)
- Petite suite pour une convalescence (2008)
- Escale à Kelibia (2008)
- Les Sabots de bois vert : hommage au poète Guillevic (2010)
- Offre-moi ce oui… (2014)
- Il fait un temps de tournesol (2015)
- Lumière des mots (2018)
- Et que la joie demeure (2020)
- Silence à haute voix (2023)

=== Anthologies ===
- Vincent : de la toile au poème : hommage à Van Gogh pour son Centenaire (1990)
- Soif de mots. T. 14 , 6 écrivaines en 2003 (2003)
- Le Chant des Villes (2006)
- La Poésie érotique féminine française contemporaine : anthologie (2011)
- Fenêtre ouverte - Ventana abierta : anthologie de poésie bilingue français-espagnol - antologia de poesia bilingüe francés-espanol (2017)
