= Ian Monk =

British writer and translator (1960–2025)

Ian Monk (1 January 1960 – c. 19 September 2025) was a British writer and translator, based in Paris, France.

== Life and career ==
Monk was born in Woking, England on 1 January 1960.

From 1998, Monk was a member of the French writing group Oulipo. Among his works in English are the books, Family Archaeology and Other Poems (2004) and Writings for the Oulipo (2005). His translations include several novels by Daniel Pennac, several works by his fellow Oulipian Georges Perec, and a rhymed translation of Raymond Roussel's New Impressions of Africa (Nouvelles Impressions d'Afrique). He wrote mainly in French, but in 2015 published a bilingual, self-translated (in both directions) ebook of poetry, Les feuilles de yucca / Leaves of the Yucca (Contre-mur). He won the Scott Moncrieff Prize in 2004 for his translation of Monsieur Malaussène by Daniel Pennac.

On 19 September 2025, Monk's body was discovered at his home in Bourges. He was 65.

== Original works ==
- We Did Everything, Make Now Press, 2024
- 14 x 14 (English version, translated by Philip Terry and the author), Sagging Meniscus Press, 2024
- Interludes (translated by Philip Terry), Ma Bibliothèque, 2022
- PQR, éditions isabelle sauvage, 2021
- Aujourd'hui le soleil, Les Venterniers, 2019
- Vers de l'infini, Cambourakis, 2017
- Ça coule et ça crache, poèmes sur les photos de Hervé Van De Meulebroeke, Les Venterniers, 2016
- Twin Towers, 3D poem, les mille univers, 2015
- Les feuilles de yucca / Leaves of the Yucca, bilingual ebook, Contre-mur, 2015
- Là, Cambourakis, 2014
- 14 x 14, L'Âne qui butine, 2013
- La Jeunesse de Mek-Ouyes, Cambourakis, 2010
- Plouk Town, Cambourakis, 2007
- Stoned at Bourges, les mille univers, 2006
- Writings for the Oulipo, Make Now, 2005
- N/S, Éditions de l'attente, 2004 (with Frédéric Forte)
- L'Inconnu du Sambre express, TEC-CRIAC, 2004
- Family Archaeology and Other Poems, Make now, 2004
- Le Voyage d'Ovide, le Verger éd., 2002
- Le Désesperanto, Plurielle, 2001

In collaboration:

- Battre les rues, in Les Mystères de la capitale, (with Olivier Salon), Le bec en l'air, 2013
- Septines en Septaine et autres poèmes, (with Frédéric Forte et al.), Les mille univers, 2013
- Anthologie de l’Oulipo, Gallimard, 2009.
- À chacun sa place, La Contre Allée, 2008
- Potje vleesch, La Nuit Myrtide, 2006
- Oulipo Compendium, Atlas Press, 1998

Publications in La Bibliothèque oulipienne:

- La Mesure du volailler (or Poulter's Measure), n° 242, 2023
- Canzone, La Bibliothèque oulipienne, n° 222, 2015
- Le Monde des nonines, (with Michèle Audin) La Bibliothèque oulipienne, n° 218, 2015
- Comment dire en anglais, La Bibliothèque oulipienne, n° 188, 2010
- La Queninisation du yucca, La Bibliothèque oulipienne, n° 181, 2009
- Les Feuilles du yucca, La Bibliothèque oulipienne, n° 176, 2008
- Élémentaire, mon cher, La Bibliothèque oulipienne, n° 128, 2003
- Quenoums, La Bibliothèque oulipienne, n° 127, 2003
- Les États du sonnet, La Bibliothèque oulipienne, n° 116, 2001
- Le Voyage d'Hoover, La Bibliothèque oulipienne, n° 110, 1999
- Monquines, La Bibliothèque oulipienne, n° 109, 1999
- Fractales, La Bibliothèque oulipienne, n° 102, 1999

Editor / translator (with Daniel Levin Becker)

- All That is Evident is Suspect: Readings from the Oulipo 1963-2018, McSweeney's, 2018

== Selected translations ==
- Rufo Quintavalle: Shelf 1–15, corrupt press, 2015
- Frédéric Forte: Minute Operas (Opéras Minute), en collaboration, Burning Deck, 2014
- Georges Perec / Oulipo: Winter Journeys (Le Voyage d'hiver & ses suites), Atlas Press, 2013
- Jacques Roubaud: Mathematics: (Mathématique :) Dalkey Archive, 2012
- Hervé Le Tellier: A Thousand Thoughts (Les amnésiques n'ont rien vécu d'inoubliable), Dalkey Archive, 2011
- Yannick Haenel: The Messenger (Jan Karski), Text Publishing Company, 2010
- Raymond Roussel: New Impressions of Africa (Nouvelles impressions d'Afrique), Atlas Press, 2005
- Marie Darrieussecq: White (White), Faber, 2005
- Marie Darrieussecq: A Brief Stay with the Living (Bref séjour chez les vivants), Faber, 2005
- Camille Laurens: In Those Arms (Dans ces bras-là), Bloomsbury, 2005
- Daniel Pennac: Monsieur Malaussène (Monsieur Malaussène), Harvill, 2003
- Mathieu Ricard / Trinh Xuan Thuan: The Quantum and the Lotus (L'Univers dans la paume de la main), Random House, 2001
- François Caradec: Raymond Roussel: A Life (Raymond Roussel), Atlas, 2001
- Daniel Pennac: Passion Fruit (Aux fruits de la passion), Harvill, 2000
- Daniel Pennac; Write to Kill (La Petite Marchande de prose), Harvill, 1999
- Daniel Pennac: The Scapegoat (Au bonheur des ogres), Harvill, 1998
- Daniel Pennac: The Fairy Gunmother (La Fée carabine), Harvill, 1997
- Georges Perec: Three (Quel petit vélo...?, Les Revenentes & Un cabinet d'amateur), Harvill, 1998
