= Marcel Bénabou =

French writer and historian (born 1939)

Marcel Bénabou (29 June 1939, Meknes in Morocco) is a French writer and historian.

== Biography ==
Emeritus professor of Roman history at the Paris Diderot University, Marcel Bénabou's work focuses on ancient Rome, in particular North Africa during Antiquity and acculturation and romanisation processes at work in these provinces.

A member of the "Ouvroir de littérature potentielle" (or OuLiPo) since 1969, which he joined one year after his friend Georges Perec, the following year he became the definitively provisional secretary. Since 2003 he combines this function with that of provisionally definitive secretary.

His Oulipian works often focus on the genesis of literary work and autobiography.

He appears in the guise of the lawyer Hassan Ibn Abbou in the novel La Disparition by his friend Georges Perec.

== Works ==
=== Some historical works ===
- Suétone, les Césars et l'histoire, introduction à La vie des douze Césars, éd. Folio, Gallimard, Paris 1975, 7-30.
- La Résistance africaine à la romanisation, éditions François Maspero, Paris, 1976
- Tacfarinas, insurgé berbère contre Rome, Les Africains, VII, éd. Jeune Afrique, 1977, 293–313.
- Juba II, ou l'africanité vassale de Rome, Les Africains, IX, éd. Jeune Afrique, 1978, 143–165
- « Les Romains ont-ils conquis l'Afrique ? » Annales. Histoire, Sciences Sociales, 1978, v. 33, n° 1, pp. 83–88.
- with Micheline Legras-Wechsler and Peter Brunt, Conflits sociaux en République romaine, F. Maspero, 1979, 196 p.
- L'impero romano e le strutture economiche e sociali delle province, (éd. M. Crawford), Biblioteca di Athenaeum, 4, Roma, 1986.
- PVN préfacier ou une forme latérale de l’histoire, in Pierre Vidal-Naquet, un historien dans la cité, La Découverte, 1998, pp. 58–66.
- « Rome augustéenne : genèse d'un lyrisme urbain ? », Le Poète dans la Cité : de Platon à Shakespeare, Le Cri édition, 2003, pp. 56–63.

=== Some literary writings ===
- Pourquoi je n'ai écrit aucun de mes livres, Hachette, collection Textes du XXe, Paris, 1986 (Prix de l'Humour noir 1986)
  - German translation: Warum ich keines meiner Bücher geschrieben habe, Frankfurter Verlagsanstalt, Francfort, 1990
  - Italian translation: Perche non ho scritto nessuno dei miei libri, Theoria, Rome-Naples, 1991
  - Spanish translation: Por qué no he escrito ninguno de mis libros, Anagrama, Barcelone, 1994
  - English translation: Why I Have not Written Any of My Books, University of Nebraska Press, Lincoln, 1996
  - Swedish translation: Varför jag inte har skrivit nagon av mina böcker, Ramus 2007
- Presbytère et prolétaires, éditions du Limon, Cahiers Georges Perec, 3, 1989 (in collaboration with Georges Perec)
- Der Verschlag, édition Plasma, Berlin, 1991
- Jette ce livre avant qu'il soit trop tard, Seghers, collection Mots, Paris, 1992
  - English translation: Dump This Book While You Still Can, University of Nebraska Press, Lincoln, 2001
  - Italian translation: Butta questo libro finché puoi, Aracne editrice, Roma, 2009
- Jacob, Ménahem et Mimoun. Une épopée familiale, Seuil, collection La librairie du XXe, 1995
  - English translation: Jacob, Ménahem and Mimoun. A Family Epic, University of Nebraska Press, Lincoln, 1998 (National Jewish Book Award, 1998)
  - German translation: Jacob, Menachem und Mimoun. Ein Familienepos, Berlin Verlag, 2004, by Jürgen Ritte
- Georges Perec, What a man !, introduction, notes and commentaries, Le Castor astral, 1996
- Destin d’un couteau, Les Guère Épais, VIII, 1, Édition Plurielle, 1998
- Un art simple et tout d'exécution (in collaboration with Jacques Jouet, Harry Mathews and Jacques Roubaud), Circé, 2001
- Résidence d'hiver, Le Verger, 2001
- Écrire sur Tamara, Presses Universitaires de France, 2002
  - English translation: To write on Tamara ?, University of Nebraska Press, Lincoln, 2004
- 789 néologismes de Jacques Lacan, Édition EPEL, 2002 (in collaboration with Yan Pelissier, Laurent Cornaz and Dominique de Liège
- L’appentis revisité, series "Monde à part", Berg International, 2003
- De but en blanc, un monologue en polychromie véritable (in collaboration with the Oupeinpo), Bibliothèque Oupeinpienne, 16, 2009
- "Anthologie de l'Oulipo", Gallimard, 2009 (in collaboration with Paul Fournel)

=== Fascicules of the Bibliothèque Oulipienne ===
- Un aphorisme peut en cacher un autre, BO n° 13
- Locutions introuvables, BO n° 25
- Alexandre au greffoir, BO n° 29
- Bris de mots, BO n° 40
- Rendre à Cézanne, BO n° 59
- L’Hannibal perdu, BO n° 87, 1997
- Altitude et profondeur, BO n° 103, 1999
- La mort mode d’emploi, BO n° 133, 2004
- Petit supplément au Cratyle, BO n° 136, 2005
- Miniature persane, BO n° 153, 2007
- Ethique simpliste, BO n° 169, 2008
- Premier mai unitaire BO n° 182, 2010
- Saturations, BO n° 184, 2010
- "Le Voyage disert", BO n° 212, 2012

=== Works in collaboration with the OULIPO ===
- La littérature potentielle, Gallimard, 1973)
  - traduction italienne : La letteratura potenziale, éd. CLUEB, Bologna, 1985
- Atlas de littérature potentielle, Gallimard, 1981,
- La Bibliothèque oulipienne, volumes 1, 2, 3, éditions Seghers, 1990
- Oulipiana, a cura di R. Campagnoli, Guida editori, Napoli 1994
- Affensprache, Spielmachinen und allgemeine Regelwerke, Édition Plasma, 1997
- La Bibliothèque oulipienne, volume 4, Le Castor astral, 1997
- La Bibliothèque oulipienne, volume 5, Le Castor astral, 2000
- Abrégé de littérature potentielle, Mille et une nuits, 2002
- Maudits, Mille et une nuits, 2003
- La Bibliothèque oulipienne, volume 6, Le Castor astral, 2003
- Moments oulipiens, Le Castor astral, 2004
- Oulipo, adpf, Ministère des affaires étrangères, 2005
- La Bibliothèque oulipienne, volume 7, Le Castor astral, 2008
- C'est un métier d'homme, Le Castor Astral, 2009
- La Bibliothèque oulipienne, volume 8, Le Castor astral, 2011
- Abécédaire provisoirement définitif, Larousse 2014
- Le Voyage d'hiver et ses suites, Seuil, 2014

=== Biography ===
- Marcel Bénabou archiviste de l'infini, Christophe Reig & Alain Schaffner eds, Paris, Presses de la Sorbonne Nouvelle, 2015, 229 pages - ISBN 978-2-87854-638-5.
