= Jacques Bens =

French writer and poet (1931–2001)

- Born: 25 March 1931; Cadolive (Bouches-du-Rhône)
- Died: 26 July 2001 (aged 70); Vaucluse
- Occupations: Novelist; Poet

Jacques Bens (25 March 1931 – 26 July 2001) was a French writer and poet.

== Biography ==
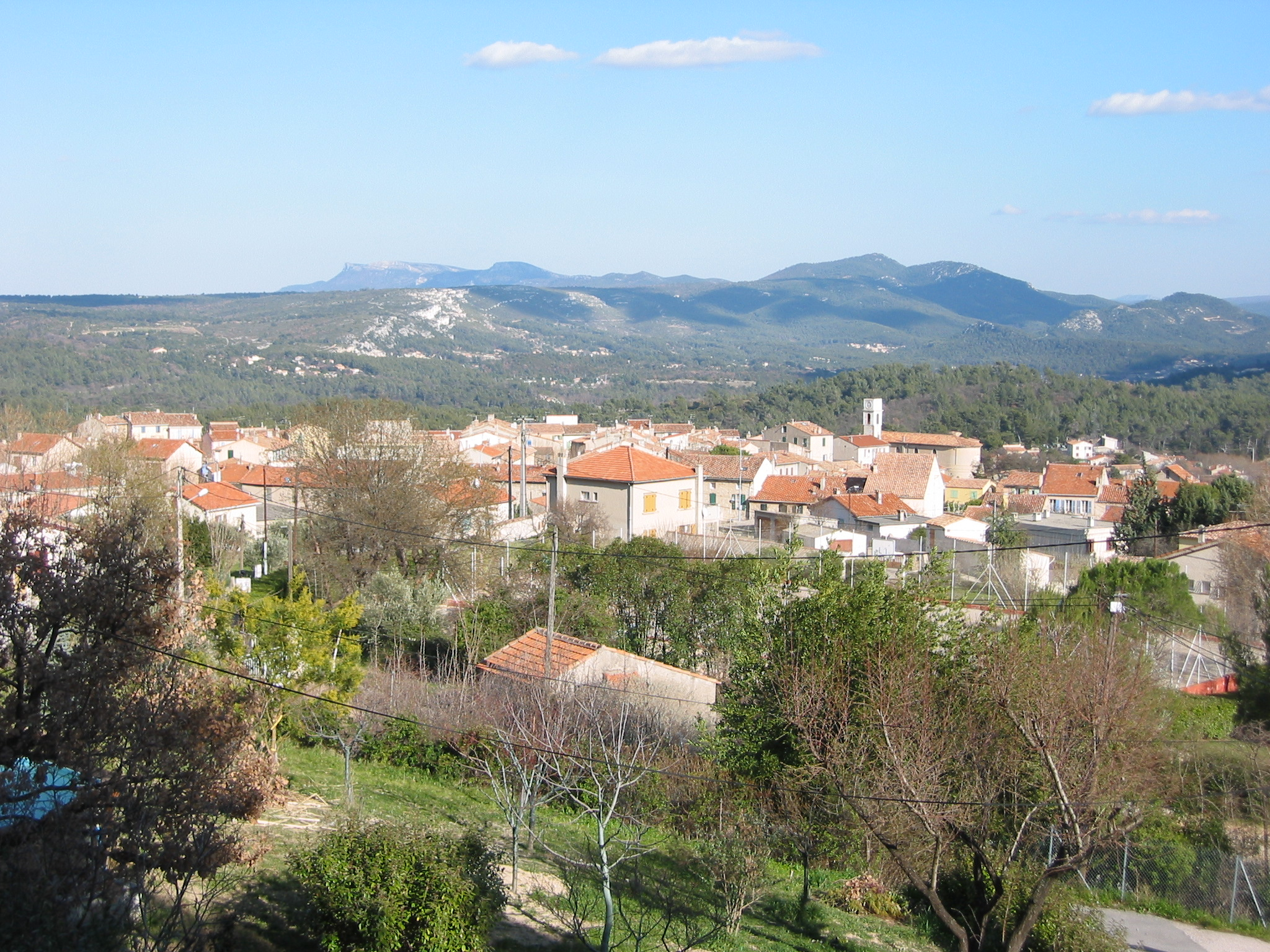
Cadolive where Jacques Bens was born

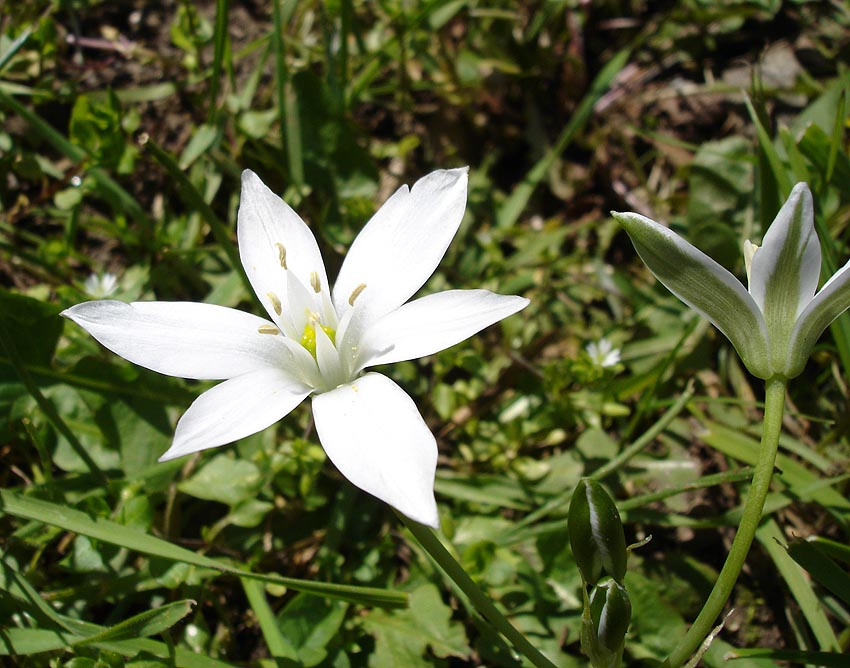
Ornithogalum umbellatum or Dame d'onze heures, of which Jacques Bens made the title of one of his books in 1994

Born of teacher-parents at Cadolive, Jacques Bens spent his childhood and his youth in Marseilles, where his studies in zoology were interrupted in 1951 for health reasons. He became the son-in-law of Célestin Freinet, collaborated with the Freinet Modern School Movement and worked at the Coopérative de l'enseignement secaire (CEL).

Jacques Bens worked from 1960 to 1963 under the direction of Raymond Queneau at the Encyclopédie de la Pléiade. Dataire of the College of 'Pataphysics; Bens was a co-founder member of the Oulipo, participated on 24 November 1960 with Claude Berge, Jacques Duchateau François Le Lionnais, Jean Lescure, Raymond Queneau and Jean Queval at the first meeting of which he was definitively appointed provisional secretary.

In 1963, Jacques Bens returned to the Alpes-Maritimes, where he was responsible for various publishing works and then relations with the press of the Théâtre de Nice (1972–1975). In 1975 he returned to Paris and took part in Jacques Duchateau's Panorama of France Culture and other programmes such as Bertrand Jérôme Des Papous dans la tête.

Between 1980 and 1991, he was general secretary of the Société des gens de lettres and held the crossword heading of L'Express and Lire.

== Works ==
Jacques Bens himself collected his books under different sections: « prose rimée » (poetry), « prose romanesque » (novels), « prose méditative » (reflexions), « prose didactique » (essays), « prose dramatique » (theatre and radio) and « prose secrétariale » (séessuibs of the Oulipo). He is also the author of the introduction of the collection of the pedagogical works of his famous father-in-law, Célestin Freinet. (Œuvres pédagogiques de Célestin Freinet, Éditions du Seuil, 1994.)

« Prose rimée » (poems)

- 1958: Chanson vécue, collection Métamorphoses, Éditions Gallimard, 104 p. (Prix Fénéon)
- 1962: 41 sonnets irrationnels, Gallimard
- 1966: Le Retour au pays, Gallimard
- 1967: Métagrammes
- 1968: Petites prophéties populaires
- 1978: Onzains incertains, texte autographié, Éditions de l'Orycte, Paris, 25 p.
- 2004: De l'Oulipo et de la Chandelle verte, complete poetry, preface by Jacques Roubaud, edition by François Caradec, Gallimard, ISBN 2070770311

Prose romanesque (novels and short stories)

- 1958: Valentin, Gallimard
- 1959: La Plume et l'ange, Gallimard
- 1962: Sept jours de liberté, short stories, Gallimard
- 1962: La Trinité, Gallimard
- 1969: Adieu Sidonie, Gallimard
- 1976: Rouge grenade, Éditions Grasset, ISBN 224600361X
- 1979: Rendez-vous chez François, Bibliothèque oulipienne
- 1979: Le Pain perdu, with twenty etchings of Proscynska, by the artist
- 1983: Cinq châteaux de cartes, series " Arc-en-Poche", Nathan, (Prix Jean Macé)
- 1986: Gaspard de Besse, Ramsay, (Goncourt du Récit historique)
- 1988: Nouvelles des enchanteurs, Ramsay, ISBN 2-85956-685-6 BnF 34943943s
- 1990: Nouvelles désenchantées, Seghers,, 224 p. (Goncourt de la Nouvelle) ISBN 2232102637
- 1994: Les Dames d'onze heures, Éditions Julliard, 168 p. ISBN 2260001041
- 1997:La Belle Étoile, Atelier du Gué
- 1998:Lente sortie de l'ombre, Stock

« Prose méditative » (réflexions)

- 1975: Pense-bête
- 1989: La Cinquantaine à Saint-Quentin, Seghers
- 1997: Quarante-neuf questions pour essayer de comprendre le monde, Les Guère Épais, Plurielle
- 2000: 12 maximes fin de siècle, Atelier-Musée Livre & Typographie

« Prose didactique » (essays)

- 1962: Queneau, Bibliothèque idéale, Gallimard
- 1967: Guide des jeux d'esprit, Albin Michel
- 1976: Boris Vian, Présence littéraire, Bordas
- 1979: La Semence d'Horus (Contes de l'Égypte des Pharaons), Garnier Frères, ISBN 2705002049
- 1992: Ginkgo biloba, l'arbre aux quarante écus, SEMAPA
- 1994: Marcel Pagnol, Écrivains de toujours, Éditions du Seuil

« Prose dramatique » (theatre and radio)

- 1973: Les Frelons, after Aristophanes, Comédy by Saint-Étienne
- 1986: Les Vaudois, France Culture
- 1987: Geoffroy Tête noire à Ventadour, Festival de la Luzège
- 1989: Une si jolie maison dans le soleil levant, Radio France
- 1989: La Guerre aux étangs, Festival de la Luzège

« Prose secrétariale » (sessions of the Oulipo).

- 1980: Oulipo, 1960-1963, Christian Bourgois; L'Oulipo, genesis of the Oulipo, 1960-1963, revised and expanded edition, presented by Jacques Duchateau, Le Castor astral, 2005 ISBN 2859205934

Trivia

- 1998: La cuisine en jeux, Zulma
- 1999: Mots croisés I and II, Zulma

Posthumous publications

- Jacques Bens, textes inédits [Raymond Queneau et la littérature potentielle, Pour une potentialité nouvelle], in Cahiers Raymond Queneau, Association des amis de Valentin Brû, éditions Calliopées, Clamart, 2011, (p. 49-64)

=== Bibliography ===
- Camille Bloomfield, Un Oulipo potentiel : quand Queneau corrige Bens, dans Ouvroirs, Revue d'études sur Raymond Queneau, (p. 56-57), Association des amis de Valentin Brû, December 2009, (pp. 43–56)

== See also ==
- Oulipo
- La Bibliothèque oulipienne
