= Cratylism =

Philosophical theory

Cratylism is a philosophical theory that holds that there is a natural relationship between words and what words designate. It reflects the teachings of the Athenian Cratylus (Ancient Greek: Κρατύλος, also transliterated as Kratylos), fl. mid to late 5th century BCE, who is Socrates' interlocutor in Plato's eponymous dialogue Cratylus.

Gérard Genette divided the theory into primary and secondary Cratylism. The former is said to involve a general attempt to establish a motivated link between the signifier and the signified by inventing emotional values for certain sounds while the latter admits that language has fallen and that the signifier enjoys an arbitrary relation to the signified. Cratylism is distinguished from linguisticity by the problematic status of style: in a natural language, where a perfect connection is found between word and things, variations of style are no longer conceivable.

== See also ==
- Natural language
- Quietism (disambiguation)
- One-letter word
- Bouba/kiki effect
- Phonosemantics
