= Anne F. Garréta =

French novelist

Anne Françoise Garréta is a French novelist and a member of the experimental literary group Oulipo. She is the first member of Oulipo to be born after the group's founding. Her awards include the Prix Médicis.

== Life and career ==
=== Early life and academic career ===
Anne Garréta was born in 1962 in Paris. In 1982 she graduated from the École normale supérieure. She was a professor of literature from the 17th and 18th centuries at the University of Princeton before being appointed maître de conférences at the University of Rennes 2 in 1995. She is currently teaching at Duke University as a research professor of Literature and Romance Studies.

=== Oulipo ===
Garréta met Oulipian writer Jacques Roubaud in Vienna in 1993, and was invited to present her work at an Oulipo seminar in March 1994, and again in May 2000, which led to her joining the Oulipo. She won the Prix Médicis in 2002 for her novel Pas un jour.^{[1]} awarded each year to an author whose "fame does not yet match their talent" (she is the second Oulipian to win the award—Georges Perec won in 1978). Garréta has also contributed to La Bibliothèque oulipienne, a collection of short texts written by members of Oulipo. Garréta wrote two texts for this collection: N-amor (2007) and Tu te souviens… ? (with Valérie Beaudouin, 2007).

=== Writing career ===
Garréta's first novel, Sphinx (Grasset, 1986), hailed by critics, tells a love story between two people without giving any indication of grammatical gender for the narrator or the narrator's love interest, A***. Published when the author was twenty-three years old, Sphinx is the first novel by a female member of Oulipo to be translated into English. Her second novel, Ciels liquides (Grasset, 1990), tells the fate of a character losing the use of language. In La Décomposition (Grasset, 1999), a serial killer methodically murders characters from Marcel Proust's In Search of Lost Time. In her book Not One Day she is “recollecting one woman whom she’s desired or who has desired her” every day for a month.

== Awards ==
- Prix Médicis (2002) for the novel Pas un jour

== Works ==
- Sphinx (Grasset, 1986); English translation by Emma Ramadan (Deep Vellum, 2015). Spanish translation by Julia Larravide, "Esfinge" (Ethos Traductora, 2020).
- Pour en finir avec le genre humain (Editions François Bourin, 1987)
- Ciels liquides (Grasset, 1990)
- La Décomposition (Grasset, 1999)
- Pas un jour (Grasset, 2002); English translation by Emma Ramadan, Not One Day (Deep Vellum, 2017). Spanish translation by Sara Martin Menduiña. "Ni un dia" (EDA Libros, 2017)
- Éros Mélancolique (with Jacques Roubaud) (Grasset, 2009)
- Dans l'beton (Grasset, 2017); English translation by Emma Ramadan, In Concrete (Deep Vellum 2021)
