= Jacques Jouet =

French writer

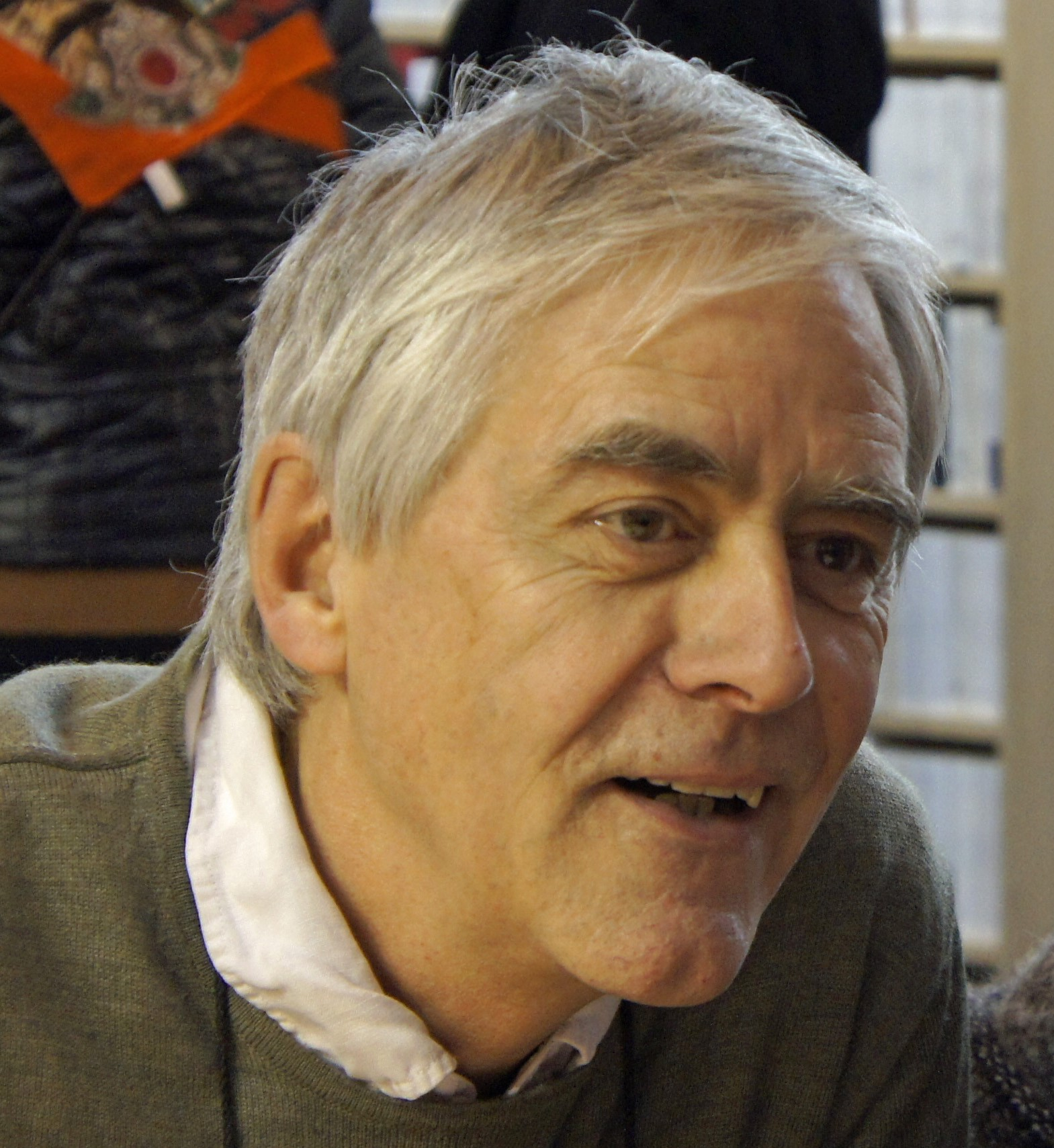
Jacques Jouet in 2012.

Jacques Jouet (born 9 October 1947) is a French writer and has been a participating member of the Oulipo literary project since 1983.

He is a poet, novelist, short story writer, playwright, essayist, and plasticine artist specializing in collages. As a member of l'Oulipo, Jouet became its focus in June 2009 when he began publicly writing a serialized novel in five days. He first became involved with Oulipo in 1978, stemming from a writing course directed by Paul Fournel, Georges Perec, and Jacques Roubaud.

His serial The Republic of Mek Ouyes was broadcast simultaneously on radio and on the web, through the site of his publisher, P.O.L.

Jouet wrote Poèmes de métro while riding the underground trains of the Paris Métro.

== Works ==
(incomplete list)

=== Literary ===
- Le directeur du Musée des cadeaux des chefs d'État de l'étranger
- Annette et l'Etna
- Poèmes de Métro (Poems of the Paris Underground)
- Mon bel autocar (My Beautiful Bus)
- Actes de la machine ronde
- L'amour comme on l'apprend à l'école hôtelière
- Une mauvaise maire
- MRM (Max Jacob Prize 2009)

=== Collected works ===
- Numerous volumes of La Bibliothèque oulipienne, Seghers and Le Castor astral
- Les Papous dans la tête, l'anthologie, with Bertrand Jérôme and Françoise Treussard, Gallimard, 2007
- Le Dictionnaire des Papous dans la tête, with Françoise Treussard, Gallimard, 2007

=== Théâtre ===
(incomplete list)

- Mitterrand et Sankara, staged in 2005, reopened in 2008 at the Théâtre Nanterre-Amandiers
- La République de Mek Ouyes, staged in 2006 at the Théâtre Nanterre-Amandiers
- L'amour au travail
- La chatte bottée
