= Daniel Levin Becker =

American writer (born 1984)

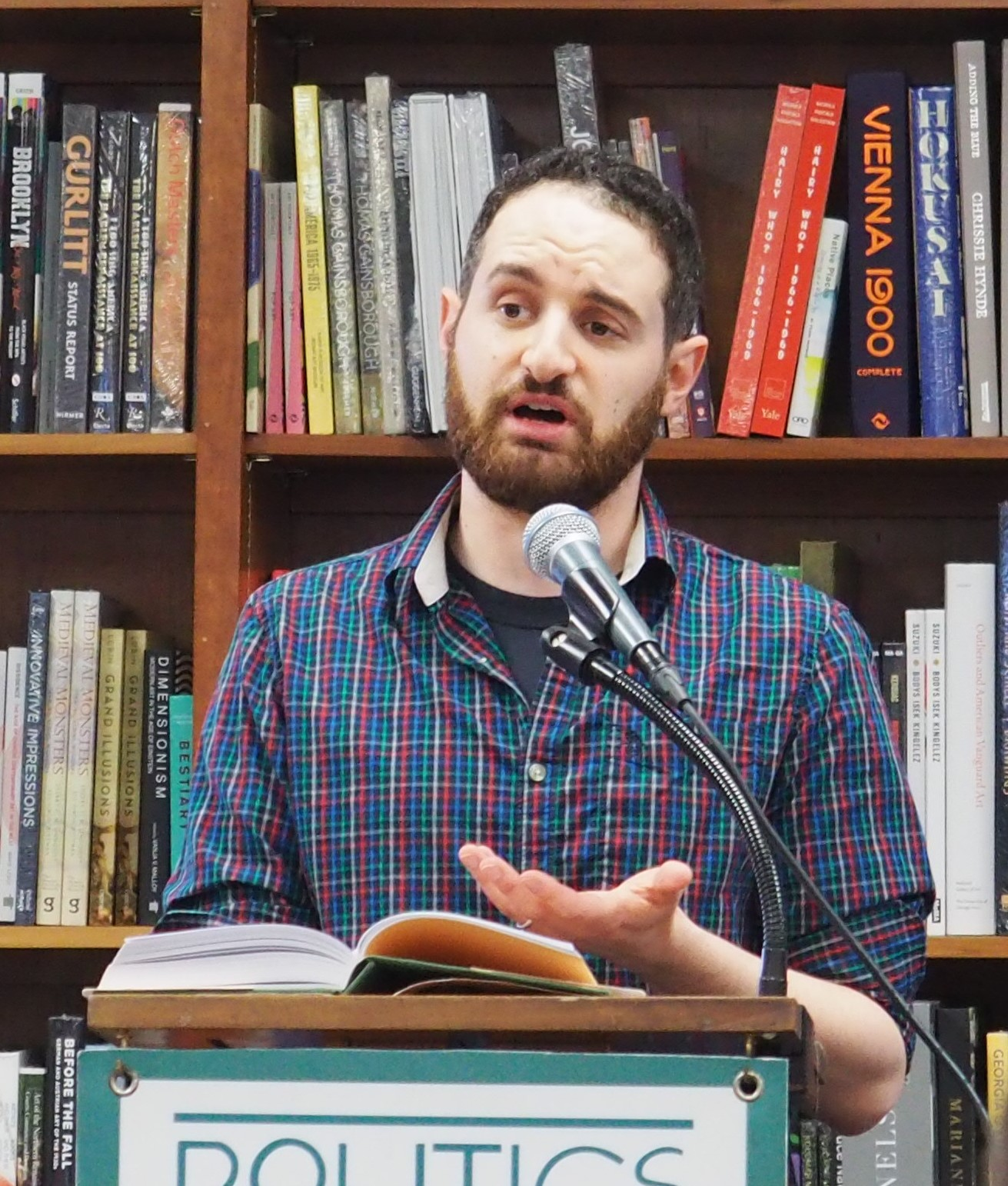
- Born: 1984 (age 41–42); Chicago, Illinois, U.S.
- Education: Yale University
- Writing career
- Genres: writer, translator

Daniel Levin Becker (Note: The last name is "Levin Becker".) (born 1984 in Chicago) is an American writer, translator and musical critic.

== Life ==
In 2006, he finished his undergraduate studies in English and French at Yale University, where he also wrote for campus humor magazine Yale Record. In 2009 he was elected member of the French literary workshop Oulipo, making him the second American member of this group (the first is Harry Mathews). He was elected after a Fulbright year spent organizing and indexing that group's archives. He is the author of Many Subtle Channels: In Praise of Potential Literature, published in April 2012 by Harvard University Press.

Levin Becker is currently the reviews editor for the magazine The Believer.

He also contributes regularly as a music critic for the newspaper SF Weekly. His writings and musical reviews can also be regularly found in Dusted Magazine, The Point, and The American Book Review,

He is among a list of contributors to The &NOW Awards 2: The Best Innovative Writing.

He has translated from the French texts including Georges Perec's dream journal La Boutique Obscure and Hervé Le Tellier's short story "A Few Musketeers," as well as Georges Perec, Oulibiographer by Bernard Magné and Letter from the Author to his Editor by Marcel Bénabou.

Levin Becker became an Oulipian when he was only 24, the youngest member at the time. He was also the youngest member and songwriter for the project band Mujeres Encinta that he joined when he was only a teenager.

== Works ==
- Many subtle channels : in praise of potential literature, Cambridge, Mass. : Harvard University Press, 2012. ISBN 978-0-674-06577-2, OCLC 758383680
- L'Herminette, Calgary, Alberta : No Press, 2017. OCLC 1059130145
- All that is evident is suspect : readings from the Oulipo 1963-2018, San Francisco : McSweeney's, 2018. ISBN 978-1-944211-52-3, OCLC 1076361462
- What's Good: Notes on Rap and Language (City Lights, 2022). ISBN 978-0-87286-876-2
