= Jean Queval =

French translator

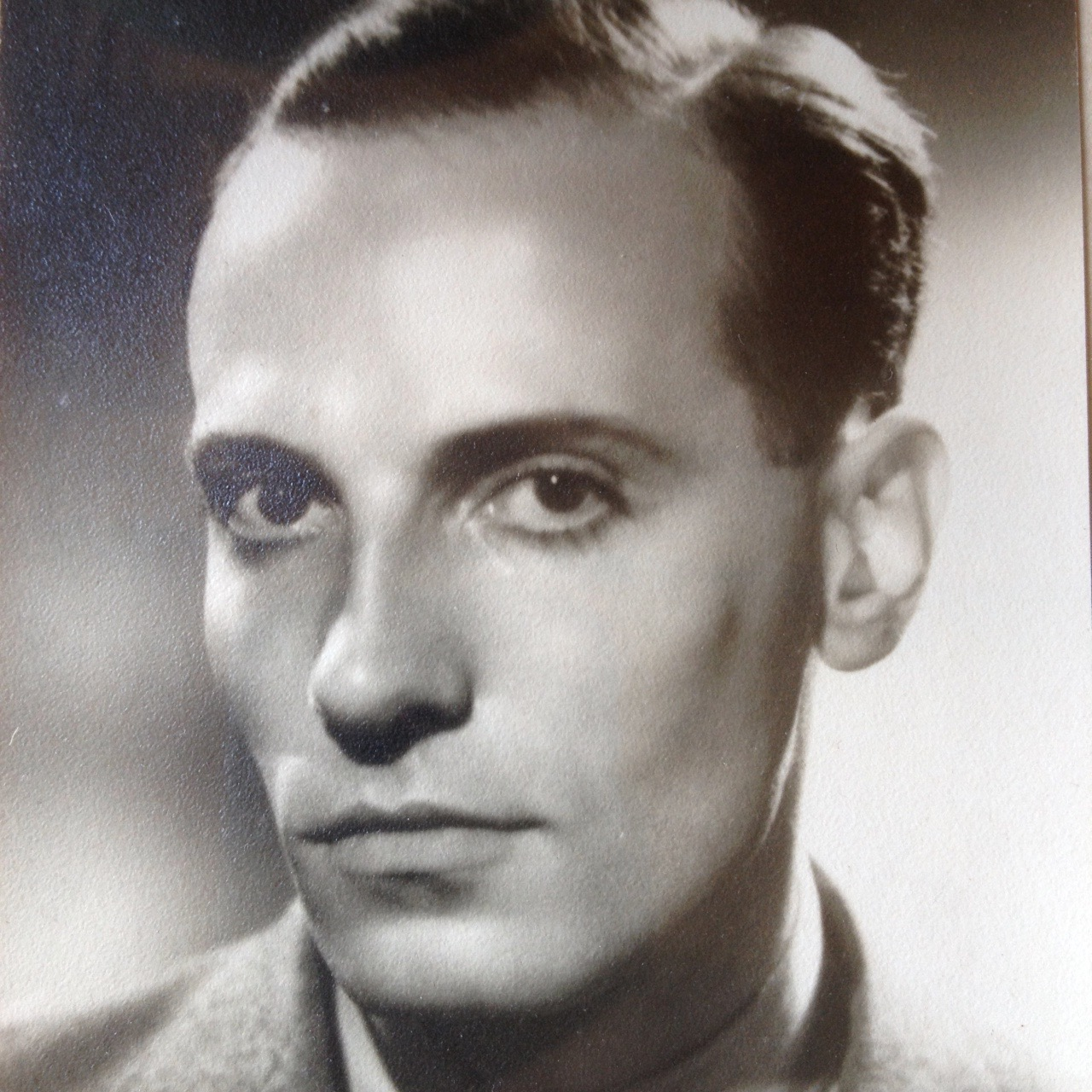
Jean Queval

Jean Queval (1913 in Paris –1990 in Fontainebleau) was a French translator, writer, journalist, film critic, and founding member of the literary movement Oulipo.
