= Michelle Grangaud =

French poet (1941–2022)

- Born: 11 October 1941; Algiers, French Algeria, France
- Died: 15 January 2022 (aged 80); Brie-Comte-Robert, France
- Occupation: Poet

Michelle Grangaud (11 October 1941 – 15 January 2022) was a French poet.

== Biography ==
During her childhood, Grangaud discovered the works of Marcel Proust. In 1962, she left Algeria and settled in Montpellier. She taught classics until 1977 before becoming an administrative assistant at the rectorate. From 1980 onward, she lived in Paris, France. In 1987, she published Mémento-fragments with Éditions P.O.L. She then published sixteen other works in collaboration with other publishers.

In 1995, Grangaud was elected a member of Oulipo, one of the few women in the group. A specialist in anagrams, she created the sestanagrammatina constraint and the "avion".

She died in Brie-Comte-Robert on 15 January 2022, at the age of 80.

== Works ==
- Mémento fragment (1987)
- Stations (1990)
- Renaîtres (1990)
- Geste (1991)
- Jours le jour (1994)
- On verra bien (1996)
- Poèmes fondus (1997)
- État civil (1998)
- Souvenirs de ma vie collective (2000)
- Calendrier des poètes (2001)
- Calendrier des fêtes nationales (2003)
- Les Temps traversés (2010)
- Le bébégaiement du beau Beaubourg (2011)
