= François Le Lionnais =

French chemical engineer and writer

- Born: October 3, 1901; Paris, France
- Died: 13 March 1984 (aged 82); Boulogne-Billancourt, France
- Occupations: Chemical engineer, writer, mathematician
- Known for: Co-founding Oulipo
- Notable work: Les Nombres remarquables

François Le Lionnais (3 October 1901 – 13 March 1984) was a French chemical engineer and writer. He was a co-founder of the literary movement Oulipo.

== Biography ==
Le Lionnais was born in Paris on 3 October 1901. Trained as a chemical engineer, he directed the Forges d'Aquiny industrial firm during the years 1928–1929. Active in the French resistance group Front National during World War II, he was arrested and tortured by the Gestapo in October 1944 and spent six months (November 1944 – April 1945) as a prisoner in the Dora concentration camp. His 1946 essay “La Peinture à Dora” (“Painting in Dora”) describes his experience as a prisoner.

After World War II, Le Lionnais became the director of General Studies at the École Supérieure de Guerre (now part of the École Militaire). In 1950, he became the founding head of the Division of Science Education at UNESCO.

Together with the French physicist Louis de Broglie and his close friend Jacques Bergier, Le Lionnais co-founded the Association of French Science Writers on 26 June 1950. Le Lionnais served as the first president of the association, which was initially funded by UNESCO.

In 1952, again working with Jacques Bergier, Le Lionnais created UNESCO's Kalinga-UNESCO Prize for excellence in the popularization of science. The first recipient was Louis de Broglie. In the following decade, Le Lionnais joined an advisory committee on scientific terminology to the French Academy of Sciences, acted as a scientific consultant to the Commission for Restoration of Works of Art in French national museums, and served as a technical expert to India's council on scientific research. He produced and hosted a popular-science program, “La Science en Marche,” for the France Culture radio station.

Le Lionnais was active in experimental and absurdist artistic movements, as Regent of the Collège de ‘Pataphysique and as co-founder and first president of Oulipo. Oulipo was founded in 1960 with Raymond Queneau and later augmented, by Le Lionnais and others, with a series of analogous organizations including Oulipopo (detective fiction), Oumupo (music), Oupeinpo (painting), Oucinépo (film), and Oucuipo (cooking). He was also closely associated with the early dadaists Picabia, Tzara and Duchamp. Between 1930 and 1932 he regularly played Marcel Duchamp at chess.

Le Lionnais wrote numerous books as well as essays and magazine columns. Their subjects include science, mathematics and its history, experimental literature, painting, and chess.

Le Lionnais died in 1984 in Boulogne-Billancourt.

== Works ==
Radio programs

- La Science en marche, Les Yeux Ouverts:
  - t. 1 La Prévision du temps (with J. Bessemoulin, R. Clausse, l. Facy and A. Viaut - 1962)
  - t. 2 L'Éclairagisme : lumière et couleur (with M^{me} Jonckeere, Maurice Déribéré, Y. Le Grand and J. Maisonneuve - 1962)

On science

- Cinquante années de découvertes, bilan 1900 - 1950 (collected), Seuil 1950.

On mathematics

- Les Nombres remarquables, with Jean Brette, Hermann, 1983.
- Editor, Les Grands Courants de la pensée mathématique, Cahiers du Sud. 1948
  - Great Currents of Mathematical Thought: Mathematics: Concepts and Development. Vol. 1. Courier Corporation. 1 January 2004. ISBN 978-0-486-49578-1. (translated by R. A. Hall and Howard G. Bergman; reprint of 1971 new translation of 1962 enlarged French edition)
  - Great Currents of Mathematical Thought: Marthematics in the Arts and Sciences. Vol. 2. Courier Corporation. 1 January 2004. ISBN 978-0-486-49579-8. (translated by Charles Pinter and Helen Kline; reprint of 1971 new translation of 1962 enlarged French edition)
- Dictionnaire des Mathématiques, PUF (with A. Bouvier and M. George, 1979).
- Translator, with Francine Béris (pseudonym of Francine Bloch), of Les Mathématiques et l'Imagination by Edward Kasner and James Newman, Paris, Payot, 1950.

On literature

- LiPo (1^{er} Manifeste de l’OuLiPo), Gallimard, 1963.
- 2^{e} Manifeste de l’Oulipo, Gallimard, 1973.
- 3^{e} Manifeste de l’Oulipo, La Bibliothèque oulipienne nO. 30.
- Un Certain Disparate, interviews and extracts, Bibliothèque Oulipienne no. 85, complete text published by Oulipo in 2011.
- Lewis Carroll précurseur de l’OU.LI.PO, Ed. Henri Veyrier. 1978.
- Les Habits Noirs, une épopée méconnue, afterward and chronology for the work of the same name by Paul Féval, Paris, Marabout Géant, vol. 7, issue 7, "La bande Cadet", p. 419-441.

On painting

- Magnelli, Galerie de France. 1960.
- La Peinture à Dora, L’Échoppe. 1999.

On chess

- L'Ouverture française 1 é4-é6, Éditions des Cahiers de l'Échiquier Français, 1935.
- Le Jardin des échecs, Éditions des Cahiers de l'Échiquier Français, 1936.
- Les Prix de beauté aux échecs, Payot, 1939; second ed. 1951; third ed. 2002.
- Le Jeu d'échecs, « Que Sais-je », PUF, 1957; second ed. 1974.
- Dictionnaire des échecs, with Ernst Paget, PUF, 1967; second ed. 1974.
- Tempêtes sur l’échiquier, Pour la science, 1981.
- Marcel Duchamp joueur d’échecs, L’Échoppe, 1997.

Miscellaneous

- Le Temps, ed. Robert Delpire, 1959.
