= Paul Fournel =

French writer, poet, publisher and cultural ambassador

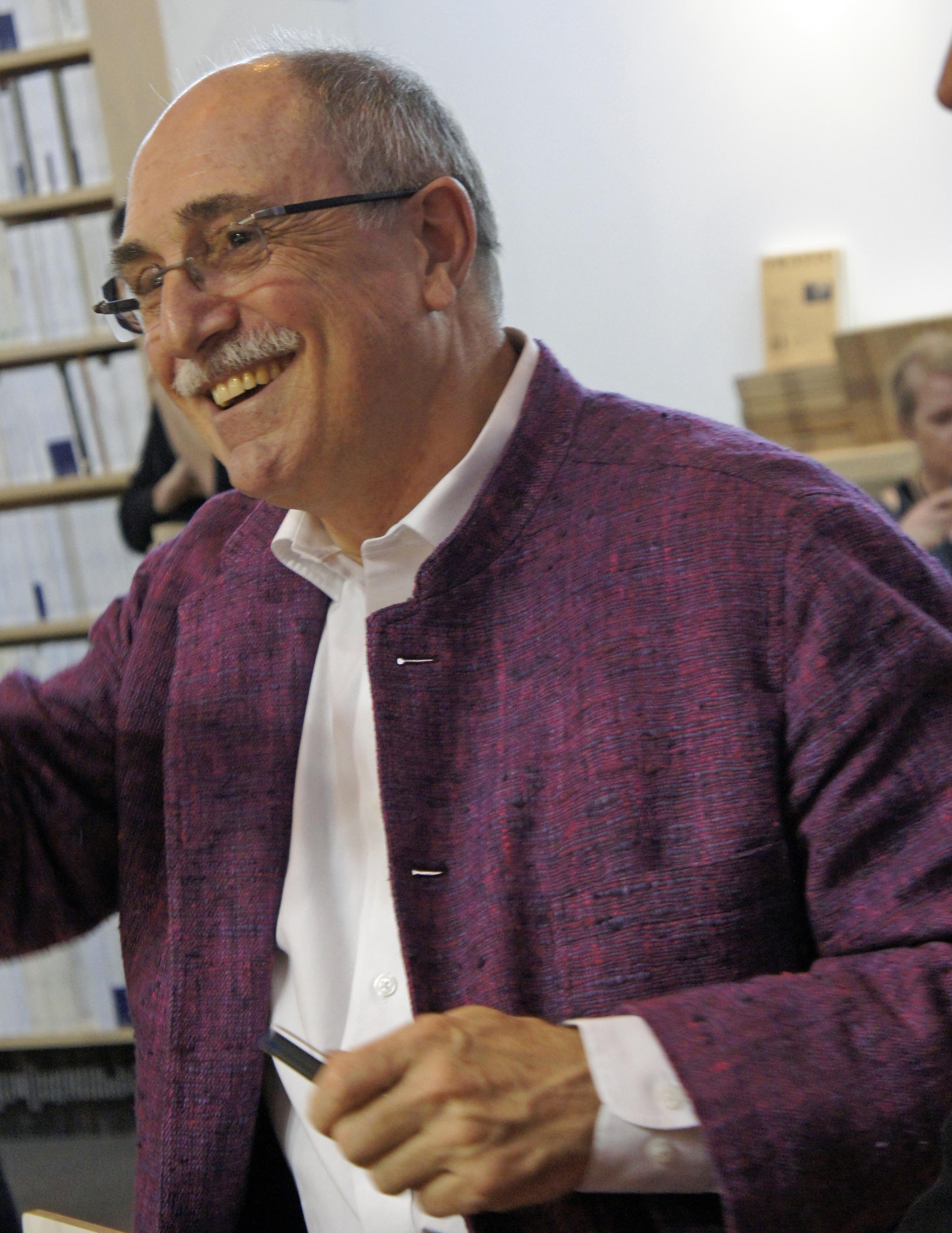
Fournel in 2012

Paul Fournel (born 20 May 1947 in Saint-Étienne) is a French writer, poet, publisher, and cultural ambassador.

== Biography ==
He was educated at the École normale supérieure of Saint-Cloud (1968–1972). Fournel wrote his master's thesis on Raymond Queneau and published the first book-length study of the Oulipo, Clefs pour la littérature potentielle ("Keys to potential literature"). He joined the Oulipo, first as "slave," then (in 1972) as a full member, and he currently serves both as the Provisionally Definitive Secretary and the President of that group. He is also a regent of the College of 'Pataphysics.

Fournel has worked at various publishing houses, notably Hachette, Honoré Champion, Ramsay, and Seghers. From 1996 to 2000 he was director of the Alliance Française in San Francisco, and from 2000 to 2003 he was the French cultural attaché in Cairo. He has been France's cultural attaché in London.

== Honors ==
- 1989: Prix Goncourt de la Nouvelle, Les Athlètes dans leur tête

== Publications ==
- Clefs pour la littérature potentielle, 1972
- L’Equilatère, 1972
- L’histoire véritable de Guignol, 1975
- Les petites filles respirent le même air que nous, 1978
- Les grosses rêveuses, 1981
- Les aventures très douces de Timothée le rêveur, 1982
- Un rocker de trop, 1982
- Superchat contre Vilmatou, 1985
- Les Athlètes dans leur tête, 1988
- Un homme regarde une femme, 2009
- Le jour que je suis grand, 1995
- Guignol, les Mourguet, 1995
- Pac de Cro détective, 1997
- Toi qui connais du monde, poems, 1997
- Alphabet Gourmand, 1998, with Harry Mathews and Boris Tissot
- Foraine, 1999,
- Besoin de vélo, essays, 2001; Need for the Bike, trans. Allan Stoekl
- Timothée dans l'arbre, 2003
- Poils de cairote, 2004
- Chamboula, 2007
- Les animaux d'amour, 2007
