= Jacques Roubaud =

French poet, writer and mathematician (1932–2024)

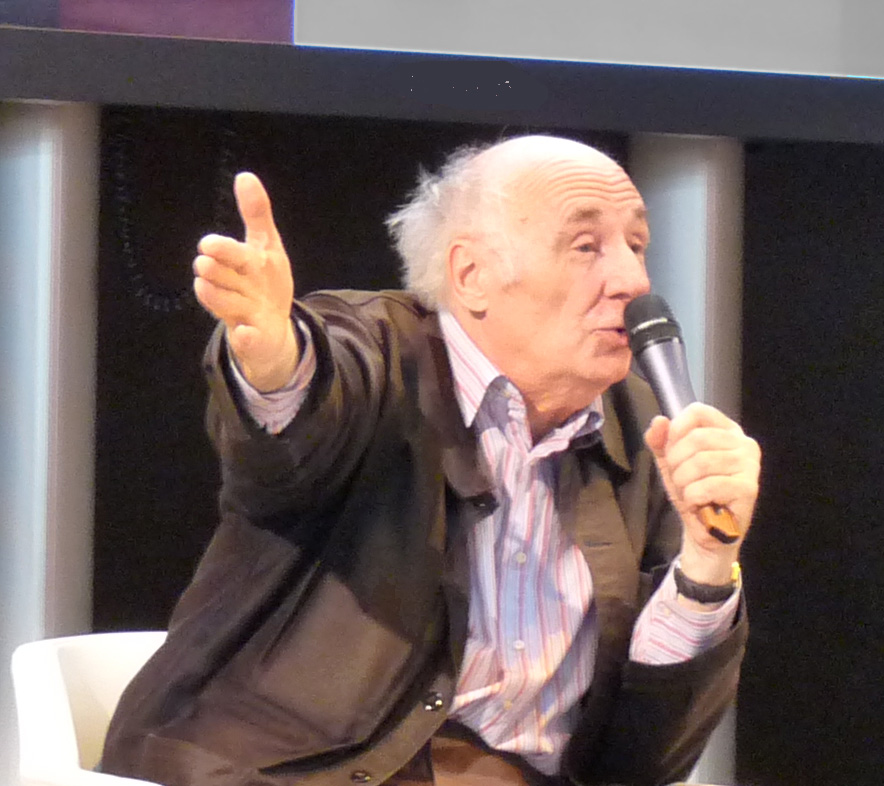
- Roubaud at the Paris book fair
- Born: 5 December 1932; Caluire-et-Cuire, Rhône, France
- Died: 5 December 2024 (aged 92); Paris, France
- Education: University of Paris
- Occupations: Poet; Writer; Mathematician

Jacques Roubaud (French: [ʁubo]; 5 December 1932 – 5 December 2024) was a French poet, writer, and mathematician.

== Life and career ==
Jacques Roubaud taught mathematics at University of Paris X Nanterre and poetry at EHESS. A member of the Oulipo group, he has published poetry, plays, novels, and translated English poetry and books into French, such as Lewis Carroll's The Hunting of the Snark. French poet and novelist Raymond Queneau had Roubaud's first book, a collection of mathematically structured sonnets, published by Éditions Gallimard, and then invited Roubaud to join the Oulipo as the organization's first new member outside the founders.

Roubaud's fiction often suppresses the rigorous constraints of the Oulipo (while mentioning their suppression, thereby indicating that such constraints are indeed present), yet takes the Oulipian self-consciousness of the writing act to an extreme. This simultaneity both appears playfully, in his Hortense novels (Our Beautiful Heroine, Hortense Is Abducted and Hortense in Exile), and with gravity and reflection in The Great Fire of London, considered the pinnacle of his prose. The Great Fire of London (1989), The Loop (1993), and Mathematics (2012) are the first three volumes of a long, experimental, autobiographical work known as "the project" (or "the minimal project"), and the only volumes of "the project", at present, to have been translated into English. Seven volumes of "the project" have been completed and published in French. To compose The Loop, Roubaud began with a childhood memory of a snowy night in Carcassonne and then wrote nightly, without returning to correct his writing from previous nights. Roubaud's goals in writing The Loop were to discover "My own memory, how does it work?" and to "destroy" his memories through writing them down.

Roubaud participated in readings and lectures at the European Graduate School (2007), the Salon du Livre de Paris (2008), and the "Dire Poesia" series at Palazzo Leoni Montanari in Venice (2011).

In 1980, he married Alix Cléo Roubaud; she died three years later. Jacques Roubaud died on 5 December 2024, his 92nd birthday.

== Selected bibliography ==
- La Belle Hortense (1985). Our Beautiful Heroine, trans. David Kornacker (Overlook Press, 1987).
- Quelque chose noir (1986). Some Thing Black, trans. Rosmarie Waldrop. Photographs by Alix Cléo Roubaud (Dalkey Archive Press, 1990).
- L'Enlèvement d'Hortense (1987). Hortense Is Abducted, trans. Dominic Di Bernardi (Dalkey Archive Press, 1989).
- Échanges de la lumière (1990). Exchanges on Light, trans. Eleni Sikélianòs (La Presse, 2009).
- Le Grand Incendie de Londres (Branch 1 of the Project) (1989). The Great Fire of London, trans. Dominic Di Bernardi (Dalkey Archive Press, 1991).
- La Princesse Hoppy ou Le Conte du Labrador (1990). The Princess Hoppy, or The Tale of Labrador, trans. Bernard Hœpffner (Dalkey Archive Press, 1993).
- L'Exil d'Hortense (1990). Hortense in Exile, trans. Dominic Di Bernardi (Dalkey Archive Press, 1992).
- La Pluralité des mondes de Lewis (1991). The Plurality of Worlds of Lewis, trans. Rosmarie Waldrop (Dalkey Archive Press, 1995).
- La Boucle (Branch 2 of the Project) (1993). The Loop, trans. Jeff Fort (Dalkey Archive Press, 2009).
- Poésie, etcetera : ménage (1995). Poetry, etcetera: Cleaning House, trans. Guy Bennett (Green Integer, 2006).
- Mathématique (Branch 3, Part 1, of the Project) (1997). Mathematics, trans. Ian Monk (Dalkey Archive Press, 2012).
- La forme d'une ville change plus vite, hélas, que le cœur des humains (1999). The Form of a City Changes Faster, Alas, than the Human Heart: 150 Poems, 1991–1998, trans. Rosmarie Waldrop and Keith Waldrop (Dalkey Archive Press, 2006).
- Poésie (Branch 4 of the Project) (2000).
- La Bibliothèque de Warburg (Branch 5 of the Project) (2002)
- Impératif catégorique (Branch 3, Part 2, of the Project) (2008)
- La Dissolution (Branch 6 (Final) of the Project) (2008)

== Awards and honors ==
- 1986: Prix France Culture, for Quelque chose noir
- 1990: Grand prix national de la poésie du ministère de la Culture, for his body of work
- 1999: America Award in Literature
- 2008: Grand prix de littérature Paul-Morand, for his body of work
