= European Capitals of Sport =

Annual award

European Capital of Sport
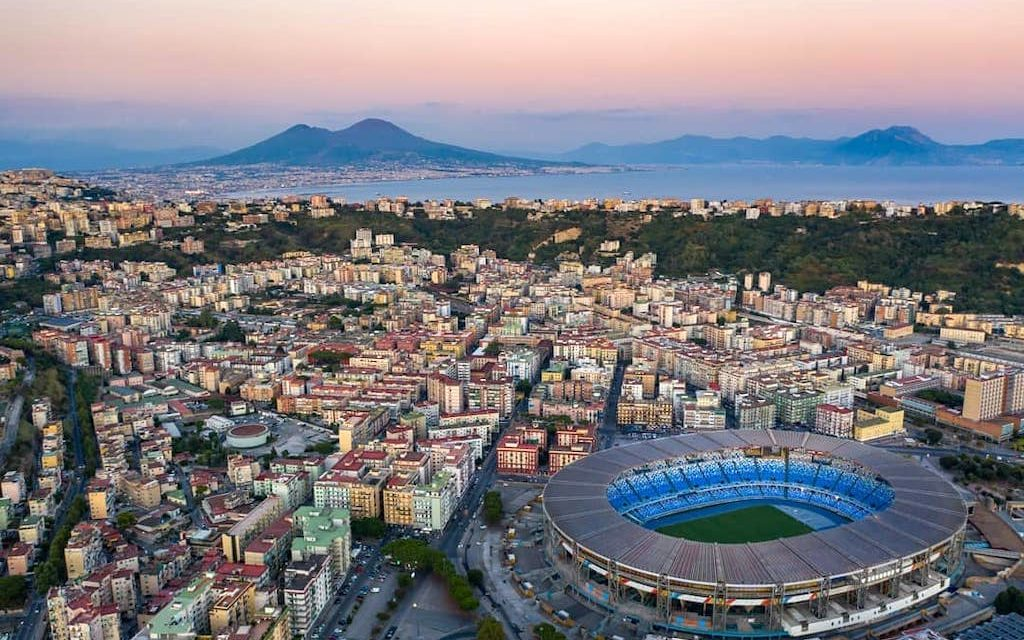
- Stadio Diego Armando Maradona in Naples, 2026 European Capital of Sport
- Awarded for: Promotion of sport at municipal level
- Sponsored by: ACES Europe
- Country: Europe
- First award: 2001
- Website: http://aceseurope.eu/

European Capital of Sport is a title awarded annually by the 'European Capitals and Cities of Sport Federation' (ACES Europe) to a city in Europe with more than 500,000 inhabitants. The award recognises European cities that demonstrate a strong commitment to sport, healthy lifestyle, and development of sports infrastructure and participation. The title is awarded for a period of one calendar year.

== Selection criteria ==
Cities are evaluated based on several criteria, including:

- Sports infrastructure
- Level of participation in sport
- Promotion of healthy lifestyles
- Organisation of sporting events
- Social integration through sport

== History and designation ==
Established in 2001 by ACES Europe, the award is recognised by the European Commission and operates through a formalised bidding and evaluation process comparable to major international sporting designations. Independent coverage highlights that cities use the title to drive investment, increase participation in physical activity, and enhance social inclusion and public health outcomes. The designation is also linked to urban regeneration, international sporting events, and increased grassroots participation. The programme has contributed to public and private investment in sports infrastructure and policy across European municipalities, reinforcing its role as a transnational framework for promoting sport as a tool for economic development, social cohesion, and health policy.

== Winners by year ==
Year	City	Country	Ref
2001	Madrid	Spain	
2002	Stockholm	Sweden	
2003	Glasgow	United Kingdom	
2004	Alicante	Spain	
2005	Rotterdam	Netherlands	
2006	Copenhagen	Denmark	
2007	Stuttgart	Germany	
2008	Warsaw	Poland	
2009	Milan	Italy	
2010	Dublin	Ireland	
2011	Valencia	Spain	
2012	Istanbul	Turkey	
2013	Antwerp	Belgium	
2014	Cardiff	United Kingdom	
2015	Turin	Italy	
2016	Prague	Czech Republic	
2017	Marseille	France	
2018	Sofia	Bulgaria	
2019	Budapest	Hungary	
2020	Málaga	Spain	
2021	Lisbon	Portugal	
2022	The Hague	Netherlands	
2023	Glasgow	United Kingdom	
2024	Genoa	Italy	
2025	Tallinn	Estonia	
2026	Naples	Italy	
2027	Zaragoza	Spain	
2028	Plovdiv	Bulgaria	

== See also ==
- European Capital of Culture
- European Youth Capital
- European Green Capital Award
