= 'Pataphysics =

Parody of science

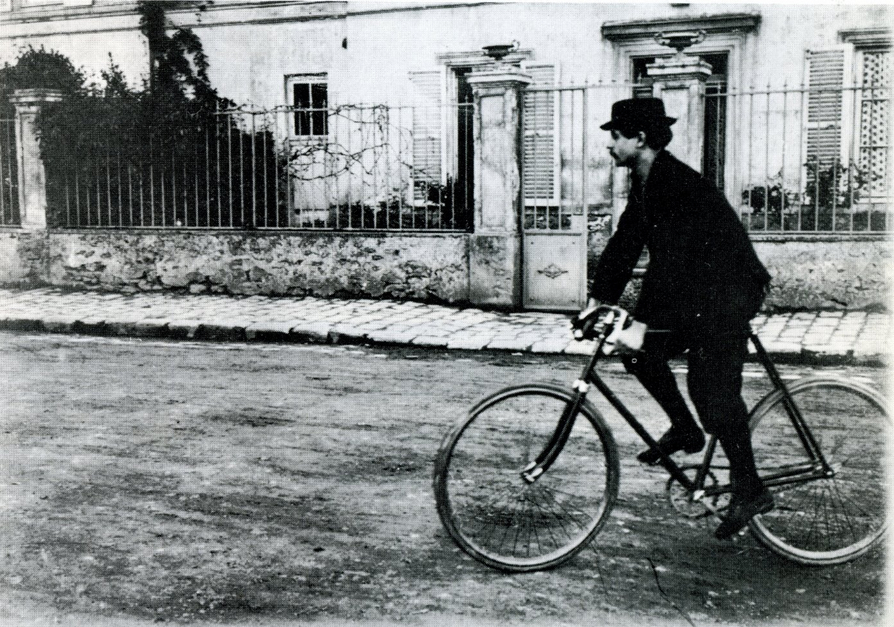
Alfred Jarry in Corbeil in 1898

'Pataphysics (French: 'pataphysique) is a sardonic "philosophy of science" invented by French writer Alfred Jarry (1873–1907) intended to be a parody of science. Difficult to be simply defined or pinned down, it has been described as the "science of imaginary solutions".

== Introduction ==
'Pataphysics was a concept expressed by Jarry in a mock-scientific manner, with undertones of spoofing and quackery, as expounded in his novel Exploits and Opinions of Dr. Faustroll, Pataphysician. Here, Jarry toyed with conventional concepts and interpretations of reality. Another attempt at a definition interprets 'pataphysics as an idea that "the virtual or imaginary nature of things as glimpsed by the heightened vision of poetry or science or love can be seized and lived as real". Jarry defines 'pataphysics in a number of statements and examples, including that it is "the science of imaginary solutions, which symbolically attributes the properties of objects, described by their virtuality, to their lineaments". A practitioner of 'pataphysics is a pataphysician or a pataphysicist.

== Definitions ==
One definition of 'pataphysics is that it is "a branch of philosophy or science that examines imaginary phenomena that exist in a world beyond metaphysics; it is the science of imaginary solutions." Jean Baudrillard defines 'pataphysics as "the imaginary science of our world, the imaginary science of excess, of excessive, parodic, paroxystic effects – particularly the excess of emptiness and insignificance".

There are over one hundred definitions of 'pataphysics. Some examples are shown below.

'Pataphysics is the science of that which is superinduced upon metaphysics, whether within or beyond the latter's limitations, extending as far beyond metaphysics as the latter extends beyond physics. ... 'Pataphysics will be, above all, the science of the particular, despite the common opinion that the only science is that of the general. 'Pataphysics will examine the laws governing exceptions, and will explain the universe supplementary to this one.

'Pataphysics is patient; 'Pataphysics is benign; 'Pataphysics envies nothing, is never distracted, never puffed up, it has neither aspirations nor seeks not its own, it is even-tempered, and thinks not evil; it mocks not iniquity: It is enraptured with scientific truth; it supports everything, believes everything, has faith in everything, and upholds everything that is.

— Alastair Brotchie (in allusion to First Corinthians 13 about the virtues of love)

'Pataphysics passes easily from one state of apparent definition to another. Thus it can present itself under the aspect of a gas, a liquid or a solid.

'Pataphysics "the science of the particular" does not, therefore, study the rules governing the general recurrence of a periodic incident (the expected case) so much as study the games governing the special occurrence of a sporadic accident (the excepted case). [...] Jarry performs humorously on behalf of literature what Nietzsche performs seriously on behalf of philosophy. Both thinkers in effect attempt to dream up a "gay science" whose joie de vivre thrives wherever the tyranny of truth has increased our esteem for the lie and wherever the tyranny of reason has increased our esteem for the mad.

== Etymology ==
The word 'pataphysics is a contracted formation that derives from the Greek τὰ ἐπὶ τὰ μεταφυσικά (tà epì tà metaphusiká). It is a phrase/expression that means "that which is above metaphysics". It is itself a sly variation on the title of Aristotle's Metaphysics, which in Greek is "τὰ μετὰ τὰ φυσικά" (tà metà tà phusiká).

Jarry mandated the inclusion of the apostrophe in both the words 'pataphysique and 'pataphysics "... to avoid a simple pun". The words pataphysician or pataphysicist and the adjective pataphysical should not include the apostrophe. Only when consciously referring to Jarry's science itself should the word 'pataphysics carry the apostrophe.

The term pataphysics is a paronym (considered a kind of pun in French) of metaphysics. Since the apostrophe in no way affects the meaning or pronunciation of pataphysics, this spelling of the term is a sly notation, to the reader, suggesting a variety of puns that listeners may hear, or be aware of. These puns include patte à physique ("physics paw"), as interpreted by Jarry scholars Keith Beaumont and Roger Shattuck, pas ta physique ("not your physics"), and pâte à physique ("physics paste").

== History ==
The term first appeared in print in the text of Alfred Jarry's play Guignol in the 28 April 1893 issue of L'Écho de Paris littéraire illustré, but it has been suggested that the word has its origins in the same school pranks at the lycée in Rennes that led Jarry to write Ubu Roi. Jarry considered Ibicrates and Sophrotatos the Armenian as the fathers of this "science".

=== The Collège de 'Pataphysique ===
The Collège de 'Pataphysique, founded in 1948 in Paris, France, is "a society committed to learned and inutilious research". (The word 'inutilious' is synonymous with 'useless'.) The motto of the college is Latin: Eadem mutata resurgo ("I arise again the same though changed").

The permanent head of the college is the Inamovable Curator, Dr. Faustroll, assisted by Bosse-de-Nage (Starosta): both are fictional.

The Vice-Curator is the "first and most senior living entity" in the college's hierarchy. The Vice-Curatrice as of 2018 is Tanya Peixoto of the London Institute of 'Pataphysics and Bookartbookshop. She was elected in 2014 to succeed Her Magnificence Lutembi – a crocodile – who succeeded Opach, the Baron Mollet, and Doctor Sandomir.

Jean-Christophe Averty was appointed Satrap in 1990.

Publications of the college, generally called Latin: Viridis Candela ("green candle"), include the Cahiers, Dossiers, the Subsidia Pataphysica and since September 2021, the Spéculations.

Notable members have included: Marcel Duchamp, Joan Miró, Eugène Ionesco, Noël Arnaud, Jean Baudrillard, Jean-Christophe Averty, René Daumal, Luc Étienne, François Le Lionnais, Jean Lescure, Raymond Queneau, Boris Vian, Jacques Carelman, Man Ray, Max Ernst, Julien Torma, Roger Shattuck, Groucho, Chico and Harpo Marx, Philippe de Chérisey, Umberto Eco, Rolando Villazón, Fernando Arrabal and Gavin Bryars. The Oulipo began as a subcommittee of the college.

=== Offshoots of the Collège de 'Pataphysique ===
Although France had been always the centre of the pataphysical globe, there are followers in different cities around the world. In 1966, Juan Esteban Fassio was commissioned to draw the map of the Collège de 'Pataphysique and its institutes abroad.

The college stopped its public activities between 1975 and 2000, referred to as its occultation. However through that time, Germany, Sweden, Switzerland, Canada, The Netherlands, and many other countries showed that the internationalization of 'pataphysics was irreversible.

In the 1950s, Buenos Aires in the Western Hemisphere and Milan in Europe were the first cities to have pataphysical institutes. London, Edinburgh, Budapest, and Liège, as well as many other European cities, caught up in the sixties.

==== Czechoslovakia ====
During the communist era, a small group of 'pataphysicists in Czechoslovakia started a journal called PAKO, or Pataphysical Collegium. Jarry's plays had a lasting impression on the country's underground philosophical scene.

==== London Institute of 'Pataphysics ====
The London Institute of 'Pataphysics was established in September 2000 to promote 'pataphysics in the English-speaking world. The institute has various publications, including a journal, and has six departments: Bureau for the Investigation of Subliminal Images, Committee for Hirsutism and Pogonotrophy, Department of Dogma and Theory, Department of Potassons, Department of Reconstructive Archaeology, and The Office of Patentry.

The institute also contains a pataphysical museum and archive and organised the Anthony Hancock Paintings and Sculptures exhibition in 2002.

The official orchestra of the London Institute of 'Pataphysics is the London Snorkelling Team.

Peter Blegvad has been the president of the London Institute of 'Pataphysics since 2011.

==== Musée Patamécanique ====
Musée Patamécanique is a private museum located in Bristol, Rhode Island. Founded in 2006, it is open by appointment only to friends, colleagues, and occasionally to outside observers. The museum is presented as a hybrid between an automaton theatre and a cabinet of curiosities and contains works representing the field of Patamechanics, an artistic practice and area of study chiefly inspired by 'pataphysics.

Examples of exhibits include a troupe of singing animatronic chipmunks, a time machine the museum says is the world's largest automated phenakistoscope, an olfactory clock, a chandelier of singing animatronic nightingales, an Undigestulator (a device that purportedly reconstitutes digested foods), a peanuts enlarger, a syzygistic oracle, the earolin (a 24-inch tall holographic ear that plays the violin), and a machine for capturing the dreams of bumble bees.

==== 'Pataphysics Institute in Vilnius ====
A 'Pataphysics Institute opened in Vilnius, Lithuania in May 2013.

== Concepts ==
Clinamen
A clinamen is the unpredictable swerve of atoms that poet Christian Bök calls "... the smallest possible aberration that can make the greatest possible difference". An example is Jarry's merdre, a swerve of French: merde ("shit").

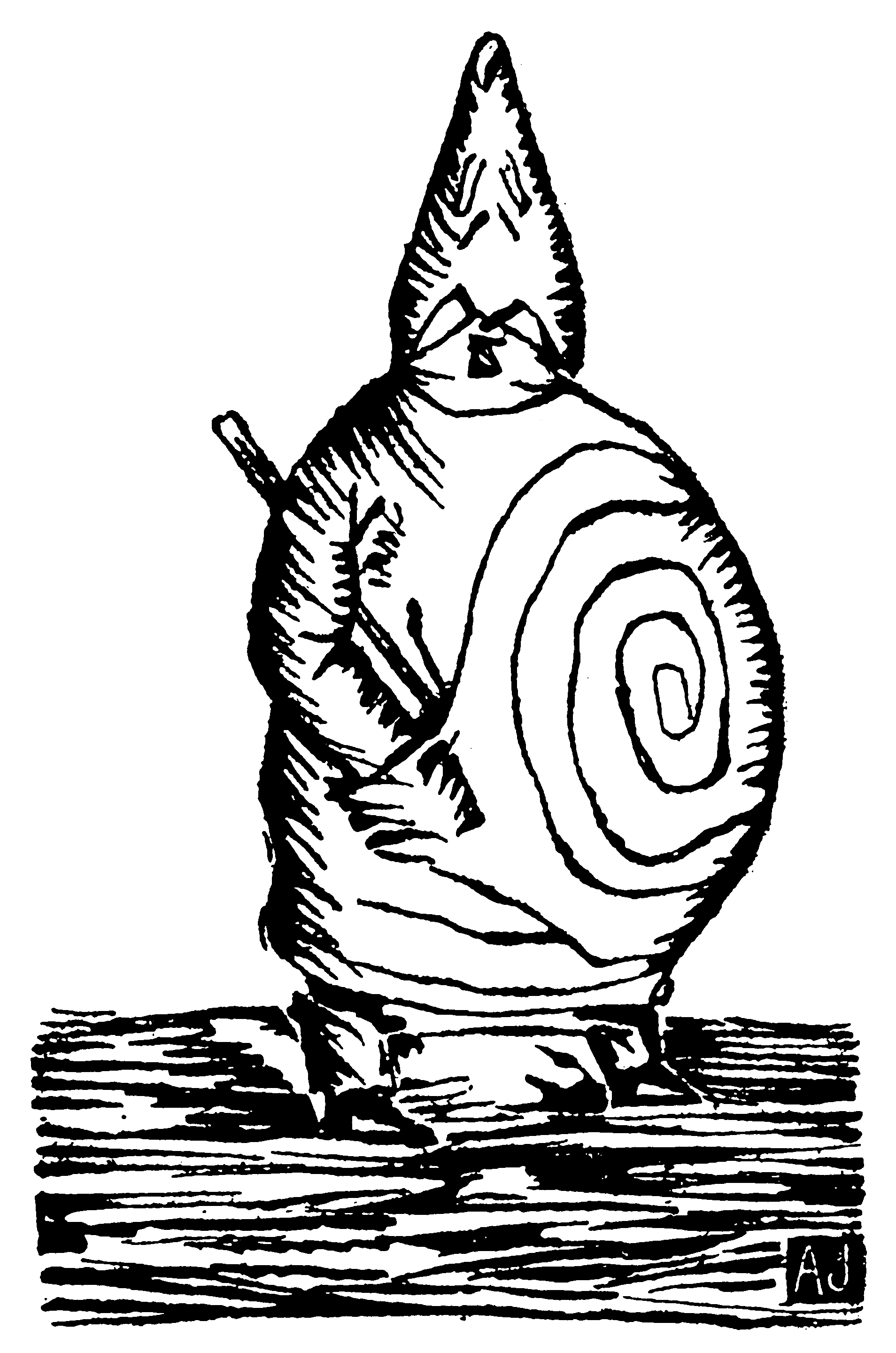
The Grand Gidouille on Ubu's belly is a symbol of 'pataphysics.

Antinomy
An antinomy is the mutually incompatible. It represents the duality of things, the echo or symmetry, the good and the evil at the same time. Hugill mentions various examples including the plus-minus, the faust-troll, the haldern-ablou, the yes-but, the ha-ha and the paradox.
Syzygy
The syzygy originally comes from astronomy and denotes the alignment of three celestial bodies in a straight line. In a pataphysical context it is the pun. It usually describes a conjunction of things, something unexpected and surprising. Serendipity is a simple chance encounter but the syzygy has a more scientific purpose. Bök mentions Jarry suggesting that the fall of a body towards a centre might not be preferable to the ascension of a vacuum towards a periphery.

Absolute
The absolute is the idea of a transcended reality.

Anomaly
An anomaly represents the exception. Jarry said that, "Pataphysics will examine the laws governing exceptions, and will explain the universe supplementary to this one." Bök calls it "... the repressed part of a rule which ensures that the rule does not work".

=== Pataphor ===
The pataphor (Spanish: patáfora, French: pataphore), is a term coined by writer and musician Pablo Lopez, for an unusually extended metaphor based on Alfred Jarry's "science" of 'pataphysics'.

As Jarry claimed that 'pataphysics existed "... as far from metaphysics as metaphysics extends from regular reality", a pataphor attempts to create a figure of speech that exists as far from metaphor as metaphor exists from non-figurative language. Whereas a metaphor compares a real object or event to a seemingly unrelated subject to emphasize their similarities, the pataphor uses the newly created metaphorical similarity as a reality on which to base itself. In going beyond mere ornamentation of the original idea, the pataphor seeks to describe a new and separate world, in which an idea or aspect has taken on a life of its own.

Like 'pataphysics itself, pataphors essentially describe two degrees of separation from reality (rather than merely one degree of separation, which is the world of metaphors and metaphysics). The pataphor may also be said to function as a critical tool, describing the world of "assumptions based on assumptions" – such as belief systems or rhetoric run amok. The following is an example:

Non-figurative
Tom and Alice stood side by side in the lunch line.
Metaphor
Tom and Alice stood side by side in the lunch line, two pieces positioned on a chessboard.
Pataphor
Tom took a step closer to Alice and made a date for Friday night, checkmating. Rudy was furious at losing to Margaret so easily and dumped the board on the rose-colored quilt, stomping downstairs.

Thus, the pataphor has created a world where the chessboard exists, including the characters who live in that world, entirely abandoning the original context.

The pataphor has been subject to commercial interpretations, usage in speculative computer applications, applied to highly imaginative problem solving methods and even politics on the international level. The Firesign Theatre is a comedy troupe whose jokes often rely on pataphors. There is a band called Pataphor and an interactive fiction in the Interactive Fiction Database called "PataNoir", based on pataphors. Pataphor is used by the Writer's Program at the University of North Florida, and has appeared in works affiliated with the Maria Curie-Skłodowska University.

Pataphors have been the subject of art exhibits, as in Tara Strickstein's 2010 "Pataphor" exhibit at Next Art Fair / Art Chicago, other artworks, and architectural works. Pataphors have also been used in literary criticism, and mentioned in Art in America.

There is also a book of pataphorical art called Pataphor by Dutch artist Hidde van Schie.

In The Disappearance of Literature: Blanchot, Agamben, and the Writers of the No, Aaron Hillyer writes:

While metaphysics and metaphors attain one degree of separation from reality, pataphors and pataphysics move beyond by two degrees. This allows an idea to assume its own life, a sort of plasticity freed from the harness of rigid representation. In other words, metaphors operate on the level of the same. They juxtapose apparently unrelated material in order to draw out subtle identities. Pataphors unsettle this mechanism; they use the facade of metaphorical similarity as a basis for establishing an entirely new range of references and outlandish articulations: a new world in the midst of the old, the novel taking to the streets. Just as Kafka sought to forge a new form of life on the basis of absolute separation from historical progress, on cultural 'intransmissibility', and just as Blanchot pursued the 'pure novel' that exists in a relationship of absolute refusal of the established world, so the pataphysician seeks to initiate a new world on the grounds of a tenuous unreality.

== Pataphysical calendar ==
The pataphysical calendar is a variation of the Gregorian calendar. The Collège de 'Pataphysique created the calendar in 1949. The pataphysical era (E.P.) started on Jarry's birthday, 8 September 1873 vulg. When converting pataphysical dates to Gregorian dates, the appendage (vulg.) for vulgate ("common") is added.

The week starts on a Sunday. Every 1st, 8th, 15th, and 22nd is a Sunday and every 13th day of a month falls on a Friday (see Friday the 13th). Each day is assigned a specific name or saint. For example, the 27 Haha (1 November vulg.) is called French: Occultation d'Alfred Jarry or the 14 Sable (14 December vulg.) is the day of French: Don Quichote, champion du monde.

The year has a total of 13 months each with 29 days. The 29th day of each month is imaginary with two exceptions:

- the 29 Gidouille (13 July vulg.) is always non-imaginary
- the 29 Gueules (23 February vulg.) is non-imaginary during leap years

The table below shows the names and order of months in a pataphysical year with their corresponding Gregorian dates and approximate translations or meanings by Hugill.

Pataphysical year
Month	Starts	Ends	Translation
Absolu	8 September	5 October	Absolute
Haha	6 October	2 November	Ha Ha
As	3 November	30 November	Skiff
Sable	1 December	28 December	Sand or heraldic black
Décervelage	29 December	25 January	Debraining
Gueules	26 January	22 February	Heraldic red or gob
Pédale	23/24 February	22 March	Bicycle pedal
Clinamen	23 March	19 April	Swerve
Palotin	20 April	17 May	Ubu's henchmen
Merdre	18 May	14 June	Shit
Gidouille	15 June	13 July	Spiral
Tatane	14 July	10 August	Shoe or being worn out
Phalle	11 August	7 September	Phallus

For example:

- 8 September 1873 (vulg.) = 1 Absolu 1
- 1 January 2000 (vulg.) = 4 Décervelage 127
- 10 November 2012 (vulg.)(Saturday) = 8 As 140 (Sunday)

== Works influenced by 'Pataphysics ==
In the 1960s 'pataphysics was used as a conceptual principle within various fine art forms, especially pop art and popular culture. Works within the pataphysical tradition tend to focus on the processes of their creation, and elements of chance or arbitrary choices are frequently key in those processes. Select pieces from the artist Marcel Duchamp and the composer John Cage characterize this. At around this time, Asger Jorn, a pataphysician and member of the Situationist International, referred to 'pataphysics as a new religion.

American artist Joey Skaggs has described his satirical hoaxes as pataphysical, aligning with Alfred Jarry's concept of "the science of imaginary solutions." His performances often incorporate absurdist logic and fictional science to critique societal norms. Notable examples include the Metamorphosis Cockroach Miracle Cure (1981), where Skaggs, under the alias Dr. Josef Gregor, claimed to have developed a cure-all derived from cockroach hormones, and the Tiny Top Circus (2014), billed as "the world's only pataphysical circus," featuring the exhibition and escape of a purported Bigfoot.

=== In literature ===
In 1948 Raymond Queneau, Jean Genet, and Eugène Ionesco founded Collège de pataphysique and published OULIPO, (Note: "In 1948 a group of writers, basically the core of the group that would later call themselves OULIPO (Raymond Queneau, Jean Genet, and Eugene Ionesco, among others), founded a Collège de 'pataphysique and produced a periodical devoted to absurdist writing.") which influenced the following writers:

- Boris Vian became involved with the Collège de 'Pataphysique.
- René Daumal has references to pataphysics in his writings.
- Handspring Puppet Company produces theatrical works with elements of pataphysics.
- Pat Murphy features pataphysics in several works of science fiction.
- Jean Baudrillard is often described as a pataphysician and identified as such for some part of his life.
- Pablo Lopez has developed an extension of 'pataphysics called the pataphor.

=== In music ===
- In the song "Maxwell's Silver Hammer" on the Beatles album Abbey Road, "pataphysical science" is mentioned as a course of study for Joan, the first victim of Maxwell Edison.
- Argentine duo Sui Generis mentioned in 1974 in their song Tango en segunda "southern Pataphysics".
- The debut album by Ron 'Pate's Debonairs, featuring Reverend Fred Lane (his first appearance on vinyl), is titled Raudelunas Pataphysical Revue (1977), a live theatrical performance. A review in The Wire magazine said, "No other record has ever come as close to realising Alfred Jarry's desire 'to make the soul monstrous' – or even had the vision or invention to try." 'Pate (note the pataphysical apostrophe) and Lane were central members in the Raudelunas art collective in Tuscaloosa, Alabama.
- Professor Andrew Hugill, of de Montfort University, is a practitioner of pataphysical music. He curated Pataphysics, for the Sonic Arts Network's CD series, and in 2007 some of his own music was issued by UHRecordings under the title Pataphysical Piano; The sounds and silences of Andrew Hugill.
- British progressive rock band Soft Machine were self-described as "the Official Orchestra of the College of Pataphysics" and featured the two songs "Pataphysical Introduction" parts I and II on their 1969 album Volume Two.
- Japanese psychedelic rock band Acid Mothers Temple refer to the topic on their 1999 release Pataphisical Freak Out MU!!.
- Autolux, a Los Angeles–based noise pop band, have a song "Science of Imaginary Solutions" on their second album Transit Transit.
- The composer Gavin Bryars has been a member of the Collège de 'Pataphysique since 1974; he was appointed Regent in 2001 and a Transcendent Satrap in 2015 at the pataphysical New Year's Eve Vigil E.P. 143 (7 September 2015 vulg.)
- The Pataphysical Broadcasting Foundation Inc. (established 1972, dissolved 2015) founded radio station KUSP in Santa Cruz, California, for (then) non-conventional radio programming.
- A song on Barcelona garage rock/yé-yé band Les Rencards' 2025 album Angles Morts is called "Notre pataphysique".

=== In visual art ===
- In 1962 American artist James E. Brewton developed a style of abstract expressionism he called Graffiti Pataphysic. A survey of Brewton's 'pataphysics-related work was shown in 2014 in Philadelphia.
- American artist Thomas Chimes developed an interest in Jarry's 'pataphysics, which became a lifelong passion, inspiring much of the painter's creative work.
- In 2000, The Laboratory of Feminist Pataphysics was founded by Canadian visual artist, writer and scholar, Mireille Perron. The Laboratory of Feminist Pataphysics has been shown at the Nickle Arts Museum, The New Gallery and Stride Gallery in Calgary, Alberta.
- In 2010 American artist Kevin Ferreira began a visual exploration into the imaginary solutions for the constructs of reality (pataphysics=pata art). The exhibit SpektrumMEK that resulted from this endeavor has been put into his book SpektrumMEK: A pataphysical gestation to the birth of Lil' t.
- The League of Imaginary Scientists, a Los Angeles-based art collective specializing in 'pataphysics-based interactive experiments. In 2011 they exhibited a series of projects at Museum of Contemporary Art, Los Angeles.
- Brian Reffin Smith, a Berlin-based British artist and Regent of Catachemistry and Speculative Metallurgy in the Collège de 'Pataphysique, Paris, often shows art based upon or influenced by 'Pataphysics and conducts performances at Pataphysical events. He was part of a group of German and Czech artists who exhibited at Patadata, in Zlín, Czech Republic, 2017.

=== In online fiction ===
- The SCP Foundation has multiple articles referencing pataphysical concepts, such as SCP-2747 ("As below, so above"), where the pataphysical reality is described as "layers of metafictional narrative" and the anomaly in question ascends the narratives to destroy them. "Pataphysics" articles often deal with the fictional nature of the Foundation. For example, SCP-3309 ("Where We Go When We Fade, Fade Away") features Foundation scientists attempting to manipulate the real-life website's article deletion feature to destroy problematic SCP objects and SCP-5999, which is an attempt at killing the authors of the site itself.

=== In architecture ===
- Le Corbusier developed an interest in Jarry's work.

== See also ==
- Parody science
- Absurdism
- Atlas Press
- Bielefeld conspiracy
- Birds Aren't Real
- Dada
- Derailment
- Détournement
- Heterotopia
- Irish bull
- Magic 8 Ball
- Metafiction
- Ouxpo
- Pseudoscience
- Neoism
- Discordianism
