= Luc Étienne =

French writer and proponent of 'pataphysics (1908–1984)

Luc Etienne Périn
- Born: 8 September 1908; Neuflize, Ardennes
- Died: 27 November 1984 (aged 76); Reims, Marne
- Occupations: writer, 'pataphysicist
- Writing career
- Period: 1952–1984
- Subjects: Slang, bouts-Rimés and other facets of language
- Literary movement: 'Pataphysics

Luc Étienne Périn, also known as Luc Étienne, (8 September 1908 – 27 November 1984) was a French writer and a proponent of 'pataphysics. He was born on 8 September 1908, in the small town of Neuflize, in the Ardennes, and died on 27 November 1984, in Reims.

After having studied in Charleville, he went on, in 1945, to teach mathematics and physics in a secondary school in Reims. In 1952, his first 'pataphysical works were published in the books of the College of 'Pataphysics, whose Regent and Chief of Practical Work he later became. He published 'The Art of the Spoonerism' in 1957, and maintained until his death a weekly section of linguistic gaffes in the French satirical newspaper, Le Canard enchaîné. In 1970, he became a member of the equally experimental Oulipo, a loose group of Francophone writers and mathematicians.

Périn is most famed for his avant garde humour, and his interest in many literary facets, such as slang, palindromes, spoonerisms, Bouts-Rimés, and charades.

== Bibliography ==
- L'album de la Comtesse Pauvert 1967
- L'Art de la charade à tiroirs : petit traité pour en fabriquer soi-même... Livre de poche. 1972. (Jean-Jacques Pauvert 1965)
- L'Art du contrepet : petit traité à l'usage des amateurs pour résoudre les contrepèteries proposées et en inventer de nouvelles. Livre de poche. 1972. (Jean-Jacques Pauvert 1957)
- La Méthode à Mimile : l'argot sans peine, (a collaboration with Alphonse Boudard) Jeune Parque, 1970.
- Les jeux du langage chez Lewis Carroll, Les Cahiers de l'Herne, n°17, 1971
- Le nouvel album de la Comtesse. Stock 1979.
- Palindromes bilingues. Cymbalum Pataphysicum. 1984.
- Textes à expurger. Oleyres 1984.
- Limericks. Oleyres 1984.

== See also ==
- Pataphysics
