= Oucipo =

Oucipo is part of the Ouxpo cultural movement that was in turn derived from the Oulipo literary movement, but with a specific focus on cinema.

The Workshop of Possible (or Potential) Cinema (Ouvroir de Cinématographie Potentielle) or Oucipo was founded on October 7, 1974 by François Le Lionnais as Oucinépo, but later become more commonly known as Oucipo.

Oucipo in itself was never very active. However, it gave birth to numerous film production groups working along similar thematic lines.
