= Jan Baetens =

Belgian poet, literary critic, and essayist (born 1957)

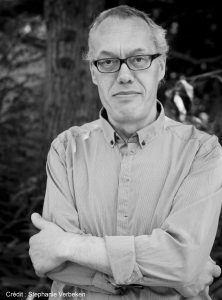
- Born: 5 September 1957
- Occupation: Poet, literary critic, essayist, culturologist, publisher, university teacher
- Awards: Prix Maurice Carême (2024); honorary doctorate (2025, University of Lausanne)
- Website: www.kuleuven.be/wieiswie/nl/person/u0004749

Jan Baetens, born September 5, 1957, in Saint-Nicolas (in the province of East Flanders), is a Belgian poet, essayist, curator, editor and critic.

== Biography ==
Jan Baetens was born on the 5 September 1957 in Saint-Nicolas.

He is a professor of cultural studies at the Leuven University, as well as being both a poet and critic.

As a poet, he began in 1998 (over 40 years old) with 416 Heptasyllables (bilingual edition with Dutch translation/transposition by Dirk van Bastelaere) and he has published a dozen collections, including Cent Fois sur le métier (2004), which won the triennial poetry prize from the Wallonia-Brussels Federation in 2007. Very close to so-called “constraint” poetry in his first texts, he gradually opened up to freer forms of expression. From a thematic point of view, he attaches great importance to the representation of everyday life in its most unexpected and humble forms, from which humor is never absent: basketball, comics and Sunday poets are some of his favorite subjects.

As a critic, Jan Baetens publishes both studies on poetry and numerous academic works on the relationships between texts and images, especially in so-called minor genres such as novelizations, photo comics, or the film photo comic.

Co-founder of the publishing house Les Impressions nouvelles, he also participated in the creation and management of the magazines Conséquences (1984–1993), Formules (1995–...) and Formes poétiques contemporaines (2002–...) .

He frequently collaborates with Milan Chlumsky, a Czech-German photographer, and Olivier Deprez, a wood engraver and member of the FRMK group.

In 2008, he curated the first retrospective of Marie-Françoise Plissart at the Antwerp Photography Museum.

In 2013, he participated in the artist residency project organized by the Brussels collective (SIC) as part of the Venice "off" Festival. His contribution La Belgique à Venise Venice is published in a collective volume of (SIC) dedicated to this residency.

In 2015, he participated in the Atopolis catalog, a contemporary art exhibition organized by the Wiels contemporary art center for Mons 2015.

Since 2019, he has co-directed, with the Franco-Iranian artist Narmine Sadeg, the bilingual website PLACE where literature and visual arts intersect.

In 2019, he curated, with Géraldine David, the retrospective exhibition of Olivier Deprez, Wrek, not work, at the Bibliotheca Wittockiana.

In 2023, he participated, in collaboration with Olivier Deprez, in the exhibition celebrating the 15th anniversary of Textimage magazine: "Ce qui a été, ce qui reste".

Throughout his life as a teacher, he organized exhibitions at the University Library of Leuven: the photo novel, the journal Arts et métiers graphiques, the journal L'Immédiate (in collaboration with the CEEI center for studies on writing and images) and the Belgian photo comic or the film-photo-novel.

He has been a member of the management committee of INSL (international network for the study of poetry) since 2019. He is currently president for the period 2023–2025.

== Personal life ==
He lives in Leuven.

== Bibliography ==
=== Poetry ===
- 416 Heptasyllabes (et 416 en enkele grafschriften de Dirk van Bastelaere), édition bilingue, Louvain : éditions P, 1998.
- Arlon, musée gallo-romain, Soumagne, Tétras-Lyre, 2000 OCLC 1400565341.
- Self-service, en collaboration avec le groupe FRMK, Lisbonne/Bruxelles : Casa Pessoa & Bedeteca/Fréon, 2001.
- Made in the USA, Bruxelles, Les Impressions nouvelles, 2002 ISBN 9782906131545.
- Arts poétiques, Chambéry : Comp’Act, 2003.
- Construction d'une ligne TGV, en collaboration avec Olivier Deprez, Paris : Maisonneuve et Larose, 2003.
- Cent fois sur le métier, Bruxelles : Les Impressions nouvelles, 2004.
- Vivre sa vie. Une novellisation en vers du film de Jean-Luc Godard, avec une préface de Sémir Badir, Bruxelles : Les Impressions nouvelles, 2005.
- Slam. Poèmes sur le basket-ball, Bruxelles, Les Impressions nouvelles, 2006.
- Cent ans de bande dessinée (en vers et en poèmes), Bruxelles, Les Impressions nouvelles, 2007.
- Pour une poésie du dimanche, Bruxelles, Les Impressions nouvelles, 2009.
- 11 Vues de Grenade, Soumagne : Tétras-Lyre, 2009.
- Autres nuages, en collaboration avec Olivier Deprez, Bruxelles : Les Impressions nouvelles, 2012.
- Le Problème du Sud, Bruxelles : Les Impressions nouvelles, 2013.
- Ce monde, Bruxelles : Les Impressions nouvelles, 2015.
- Une leçon d’élégance, in Géodésiques. Dix Rencontres entre science et littérature (collectif), Bruxelles : L’Arbre de Diane, 2015.
- La Fenêtre ouverte de Jos. Albert, in Le Pavillon des douze (film de Claude François; production ImageCréation.com, Les Films de la Passerelle, RTBF, 2017).
- La Lecture (avec des photographies de Milan Chlumsky), Bruxelles : Les Impressions nouvelles, 2017.
- Ici, mais plus maintenant (avec des photographies de Milan Chlumsky), Bruxelles : Les Impressions nouvelles, 2019
- Après, depuis, Bruxelles : Les Impressions nouvelles, 2021
- Frankenstein 1973–2020 (version bilingue, français/espagnol, en collaboration avec Domingo Sanchez-Mesa), Grenade, EUG, 2021.
- Tant et tant (design de Geoffrey Brusatto et images de Sébastien Conard; version quadrilingue, avec M. Kasper (anglais), Sis Matthé (néerlandais) et Jing Yun (chinois)). Gand, Het Balanseer, 2022.
- Geneviève Asse, Bruxelles, Bibliotheca Wittockiana, 2022.
- Mon jardin des plantes (avec des gravures d'Olivier Deprez), livre d'artiste, Liège, Atelier Poésie Pur Porc, 2022.
- Vacances romaines, Bruxelles, Les Impressions nouvelles, 2023
- Changer de sens (avec des photos de l'auteur), Billère, éd. L'Herbe qui tremble, 2023
- Reproduction interdite (avec des gravures de Frédéric Coché), Volx, éd. EF, DO (En Fait, Des Objets)
- Cahiers de Grenade (Retrait au noir), Flémalle, éd. Tétras Lyre, 2023
- Rabiots, en collaboration avec Sébastien Conard, Bruxelles, éd. Blow Books/La Crypte Tonique, 2023

=== Novel ===
- Faire sécession. D'autre part (in French). Paris: L’herbe qui tremble. 2017. p. 112. ISBN 9782918220602.

=== Comic ===
- Le Roman-photo (en collaboration avec Clémentine Mélois), Bruxelles : Le Lombard, 2018

=== Photo comic ===
- Une fille comme toi. Uncreative writ (in French). Paris: Jean Boîte Éditions. 2020. ISBN 9782365680325.

=== Essays (selection) ===
- Formes et politique de la bande dessinée, Peeters Vrin, 1998.
- Romans à contraintes, Amsterdam : Rodopi, 2005.
- Hergé écrivain, Flammarion, coll. Champs, Paris, 2006.
- La Novellisation. Du film au roman, Bruxelles : Les Impressions nouvelles, 2008.
- Pour le roman-photo, Bruxelles : Les Impressions nouvelles, 2010 (édition élargie en 2017).
- La Bibliothèque de Villers suivi de Tombeau d'Agatha Christie et complété par une lecture de Jan Baetens, Éditions Labor, coll. Espace Nord No. 192, 2004 [réédition 2012].
- The Graphic Novel, New York : Cambridge UP, 2014 (en collab. avec Hugo Frey).
- Pour en finir avec la poésie dite minimaliste, Bruxelles : Les Impressions nouvelles, 2014.
- Correspondance. The Birth of Belgian Surrealism, New York : Lang, 2015 (en collab. avec Michael Kasper; trad. annotée de Correspondance de Paul Nougé, Marcel Lecomte et Camille Goemans).
- À Voix haute, Bruxelles : Les Impressions nouvelles, 2016.
- Novelization: From Film to Novel (trad.), Columbus (Ohio), Ohio State University Press, 2018.
- The Cambridge History of the Graphic Novel, eds. Jan Baetens, Hugo Frey, Stephen E. Tabachnick, New York : Cambridge UP, 2018
- Réinventer le vers. Philippe Beck en conversation avec Jan Baetens, Bruxelles/Amay : Midis de la Poésie/L’Arbre à paroles, 2018
- Petites Mythologies flamandes (en collaboration avec Karel Vanhaesebrouck, texte, et Brecht Van Maele, photographies, trad. Monique Nagielkopf et Daniel Vandergucht), Bruxelles : La Lettre volée, 2019
- The Film Photonovel. A Cultural History of Forgotten Adaptations, Austin : Texas University Press, 2019.
- Rebuilding Storyworlds. On The Oscure Cities by Schuiten and Peeters, New Brunswick : Rutgers University Press, 2020.
- Comme un rat. Paris: L'Herbe qui tremble. 2020. ISBN 978-2-491462-05-5.
- Adaptation et bande dessinée, Bruxelles : Les Impressions nouvelles, 2020.
- Illustrer Proust. Histoire d'un défi, Bruxelles : Les Impressions nouvelles, 2022.
- A Fotonovela. O Estereotipo como surpresa, Porto : Instituto de Literatura Comparada Margarida Losa (FLUP) & Ed. Afrontamento, 2022.
- The American Graphic Novel, eds. Jan Baetens, Hugo Frey, Fabrice Leroy, New York : Cambridge UP, 2023

== Reception ==
=== Awards et distinctions ===
- 2007 : triennial poetry award from the French Community of Belgium for the collection Cent fois sur le métier;
- 2015 : Élie-Rodenbach award pour le best Flemish poet writing in French, granted by the Association of Belgian writers writing in French;
- 2022 : Grand essay prize from the Académie royale de langue et de littérature françaises de Belgique for Illustrer Proust.

=== Homages ===
- 2022 : Vivre sa vie, Exposition bibliographique, Université de Grenade from 14 March to 16 May 2023. Hommage au professeur Jan Baetens.
