= Ouxpo =

Ouxpo is an acronym for "Ouvroir d'X Potentielle". It is an umbrella group for Oulipo, Oubapo, Outrapo, etc. The term 'ouvroir', originally used in conjunction with works of charity, was reused by Raymond Queneau for a blend of 'ouvroir' and 'œuvre' ("work") and roughly corresponds to the English 'workshop'. The term 'potentiel' is used in the sense of that "which is possible, or realisable if one follows certain rules".

== History ==
Created within the Collège de 'Pataphysique in 1960, Oulipo is now better known than the college itself and has survived the decline of the college.

In accordance with the wishes of François Le Lionnais and Raymond Queneau, other Ouvroirs d'X Potentielle have been spun off from Oulipo for all the arts. Each ouvroir is dedicated to some field 'X'. It analyses the pre-existing constraints, and investigates new forms of potential creations within the field. The job of coordinating the ouvroirs was given first to François Le Lionnais, then Noël Arnaud, and then Milie von Bariter.

== The official ouvroirs ==
After 1960-11-24 when Oulipo was created, thirteen years passed before the appearance of Oulipopo (LIttérature POlicière, detective literature) in 1973, twenty years before Oupeinpo (PEINture, painting) in 1980, and 31 years before Outrapo (TRAgicomédie) in 1991, the first ouvroir to be created without François Le Lionnais. Since then, a new ouvroir has arisen almost every year.

A list of some Ouxpo groups:

- Oubapo, (BAnde dessinée, or comics)
- Ouhispo, (HIStory)
- Oumapo, (MArionnettes)
- Ouphopo, (PHOtographie)
- Oulipo, (LIttérature)
- Oulipolipo, (LIbyco POlonais de LIttérature)
- Ou'inpo, (INformatique, or information technology)
- Ouca(ta)po, (CATAstrophe)
- Oupypo, ('PYgology')
- Ouarchpo, (ARCHitecture)
- Oupolpot, (POLitique)
- Ougrapo, (design GRAphique)
- Oucarpo, (CARtography)

Oumupo and Oucipo (MUsique and CInématographie) were created very early, but the dates are uncertain and these ouvroirs probably experienced multiple births. In fact, many Oumupo seem to co-exist. Oucuipo (CUIsine) was created from a fringe activity of Oulipo.

== Some others ==
Ougrapo (GRAmmaire) wants to remain independent of Ouxpo. Some lists mention both an Oumathpo and an Oupornpo. Others, some probably parodies of ouvroirs, include Outyppo (TYPographie), Oupopo (POlitique, again), Oumapo (MAthematique), Oulitramupo (LIttérature TRAduite en MUsique), Oupipo (PIètrerie, from piètre 'mediocre'), Oulipo (but pronounced oulīpo, as in Liposuction), Ouecopo (ECOnomy) — but these do not appear to be either authentic or members of Ou-X-Po.

There exists also an Oucopo (COmique), an Ougéopo (GÉOgraphie), an Oujapo (JArdinage or gardening), and an Ououpo (OUxpo (meta-oulipo)).

The notion of an Ouflarfpo (FLARF) has also recently been theorized as a means of resolving some of the aesthetic and political tensions between flarf and conceptual poetry.
