= André Blavier =

Belgian poet (1922–2001)

André Blavier (23 October 1922 – 12 June 2001) was a Belgian poet. From 1961 he was a member of the literary group Oulipo and served as their foreign correspondent.

He was born in Verviers into a working-class family. His wife was the collage artist and translator Odette Blavier.

Blavier was greatly influenced by the work of Raymond Queneau, and became a member of Oulipo (the name is a contraction for Ouvrage de littérature potentielle or "workshop of potential literature"), a group consisting of mostly French-speaking writers and mathematicians who create literary works using constrained writing techniques.
