= Eodermdrome =

An eodermdrome is a form of word play wherein a word (or phrase) is formed from a set of letters (or words) in such a way that it has a non-planar spelling net. Gary S. Bloom, Allan Gewirtz, John W. Kennedy, and Peter J. Wexler first described the eodermdrome in May 1980, and it subsequently became more widely known after publication in Word Ways: The Journal of Recreational Linguistics in August 1980.

It is well illustrated by the word eodermdrome itself. Eodermdrome contains only the letters e, o, d, r and m. When plotted as a graph, the lettered vertices are sequentially connected by edges to spell a word. If the graph is non-planar, the word is an eodermdrome. The graph of eodermdrome is the non-planar graph K_{5}.

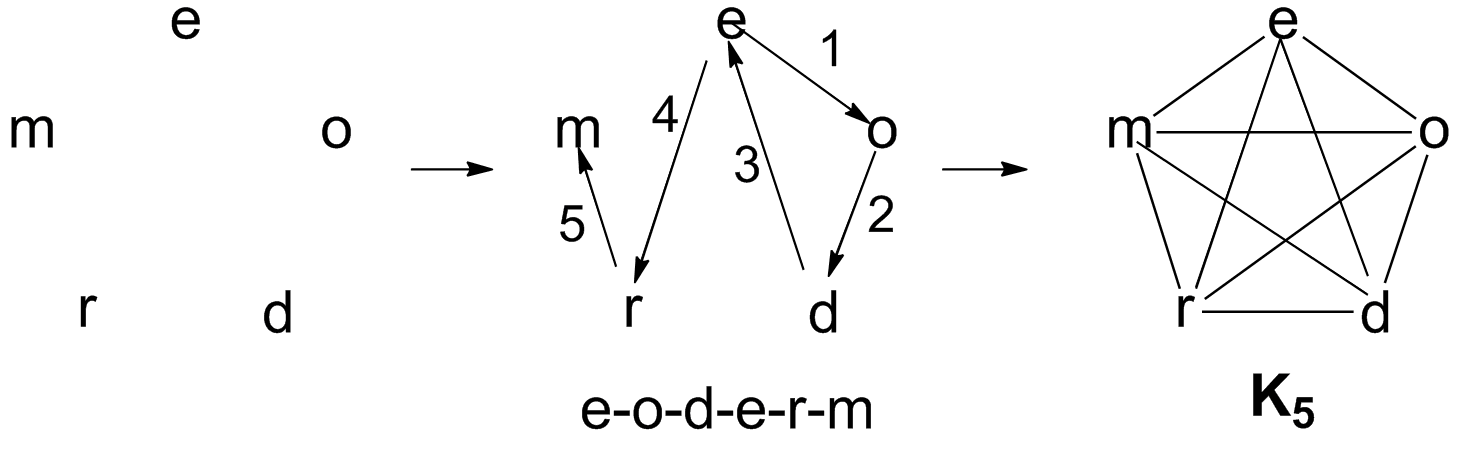
K_{5} graph of eodermdrome

Eckler searched for all eodermdromes in Webster's Dictionary. One of his examples is supersaturates. The graph of the complete word contains a subgraph which is a subdivision of the non-planar graph K_{3,3}, and as such is itself non-planar.

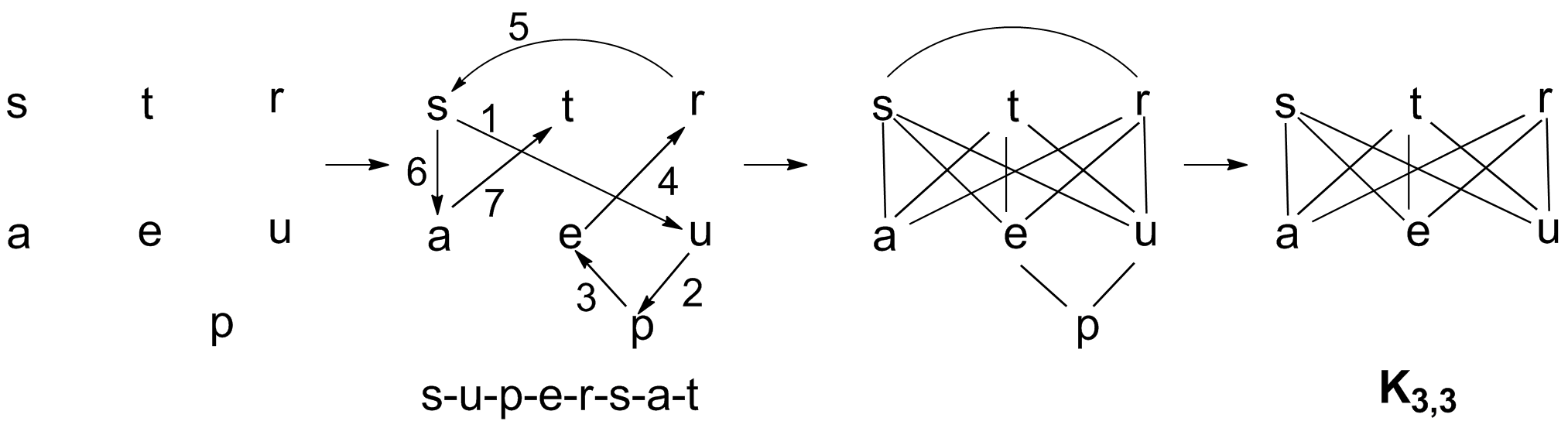
K_{3,3} graph of "supersaturates"

By extension, the vertices can be identified with words instead of letters to form eodermdromic phrases or sentences.

The concept has been studied within both mathematics and linguistics. The eodermdrome is one of the constraints used by the Oulipo group.

== See also ==
- Graph theory
- Kuratowski's theorem
- Palindrome
