= Ougrapo =

Ougrapo ("Ouvroir du design graphique potentiel"; roughly translated as "workshop of potential graphic design") was founded in Frankfurt (Main), in 2000. Ougrapo is an archive and a workshop for "graphic design under constraints", researching, collecting and applying methods and processes to design.

== See also ==
- Ouxpo
- Oulipo
