= Anticipatory plagiarism =

Anticipatory plagiarism is a concept first introduced by the Oulipo group of poets. The concept involves the study of historical literature to uncover works which either use, or refer to, constraint- or rule-based writing methods as defined by members of the Oulipo group. The Oulipo poets called these past writers 'anticipatory plagiarists'.

The paradoxical concept of anticipatory plagiarism has more recently been proposed as an analytical tool with reference to Russian studies.

== List of anticipatory plagiarists (according to the Oulipo group) ==
- Jonathan Swift and his literary invention called The Engine, in his 1726 novel Gulliver's Travels
- Joe Brainard's I Remember
- François Rabelais' Gargantua and Pantagruel
