= Outrapo =

Outrapo stands for "Ouvroir de tragicomédie potentielle", which translates roughly as "workshop of potential tragicomedy". It was founded in London, in 1991, and it seeks to mine the potentialities of stage performance, using new or preexistent constraints.

The members, by order of entry in scene are:

- Stanley Chapman
- Milie von Bariter
- Cosima Schmetterling
- Jean-Pierre Poisson
- Anne Feillet
- Felix Pruvost
- Tom Stoppard

== See also ==
- Theatrical constraints
- Ouxpo
- Oulipo
