= European Green Capital Award =

Award for a European city based on its environmental record

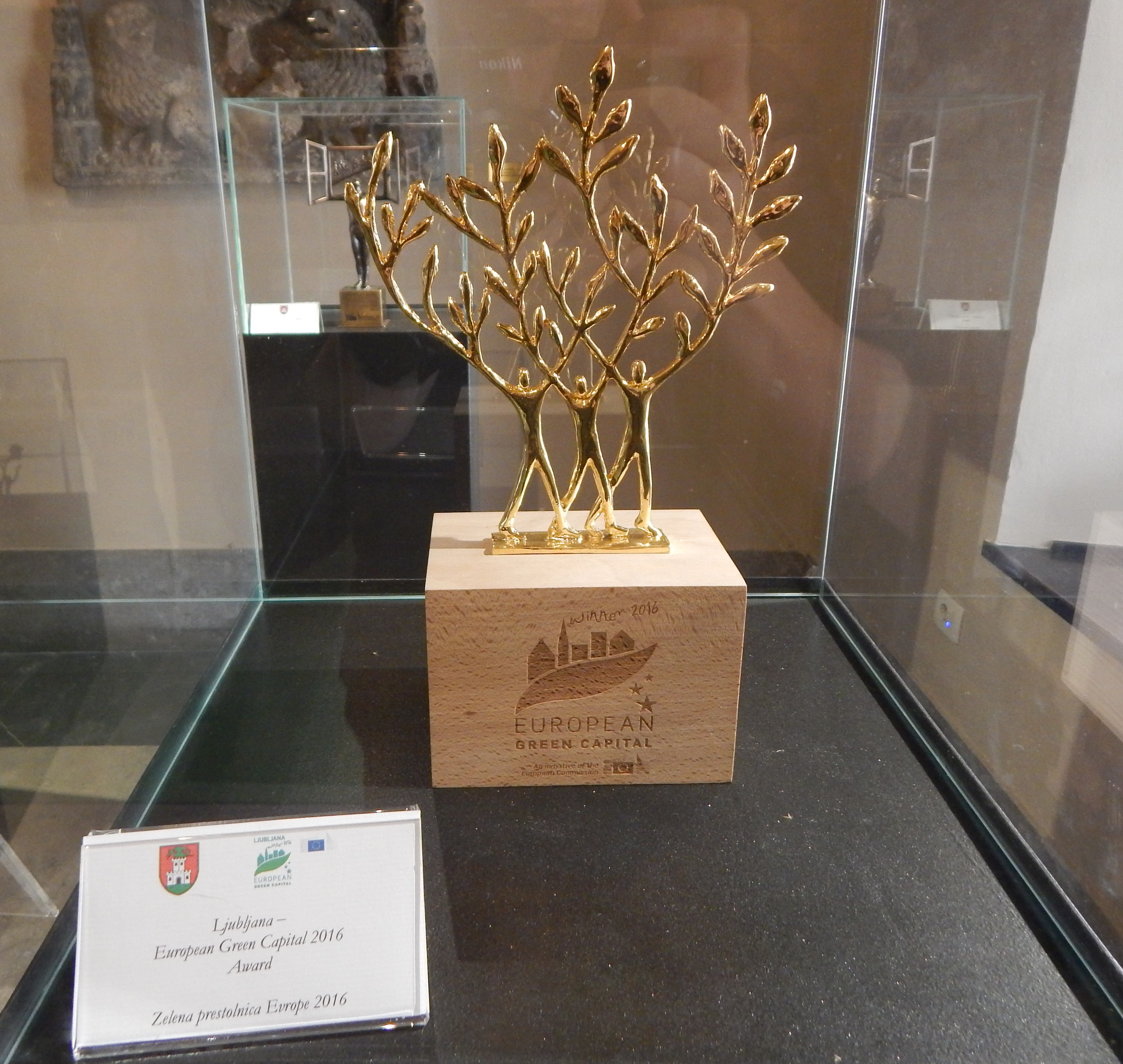
European Green Capital award presentation in Ljubljana in 2016

The European Green Capital Award (EGCA) is an award given by the European Commission each year to a European city based on its environmental record. The award was launched on 22 May 2008, with the first award being given to Stockholm for the year 2010. The European Commission has long recognised the important role that local authorities play in improving the environment, and their high level of commitment to genuine progress. The European Green Capital Award has been conceived as an initiative to promote and reward these efforts.

== Award process ==
Starting in 2010, one European city is selected each year as the European Green Capital of the year. The award is given to a city that:

- Has a consistent record of achieving high environmental standards;
- Is committed to ongoing and ambitious goals for further environmental improvement and sustainable development;
- Can act as a role model to inspire other cities and promote best practices to all other European cities.

== Eligibility ==
All cities across Europe with more than 100,000 inhabitants can be a candidate for European Green Capital. The award is open to EU Member States, EU candidate countries, Iceland, Liechtenstein, Norway and Switzerland. In countries where there is no city with more than 100,000 inhabitants, the largest city is eligible to apply. Where applicable, cities may apply for either the EGCA or EGL, but not both, in any given year.

Entries are assessed on the basis of 12 indicators: local contribution to global climate change, transport, green urban areas, noise, waste production and management, nature and biodiversity, air, water consumption, waste water treatment, eco-innovation and sustainable employment, environmental management of the local authority, and energy performance.

The title is awarded by an international jury supported by a panel of experts in various environmental fields.

== History ==
The idea of a European Green Capital was originally conceived at a meeting in May 2006 in Tallinn, Estonia. The award is the result of an initiative taken by 15 European cities (Tallinn, Helsinki, Riga, Vilnius, Berlin, Warsaw, Madrid, Ljubljana, Prague, Vienna, Kiel, Kotka, Dartford, Tartu and Glasgow) and the Association of Estonian cities, who submitted the so-called Tallinn Memorandum to the European Commission, proposing the establishment of an award rewarding cities that are leading the region in environmentally friendly urban living. The award was officially launched based on an initiative of the European Commission on 22 May 2008. The first award was given to Stockholm for the year 2010, and each year since one European city is selected as the European Green Capital.

=== Winners ===
- 2010: (Sweden) Stockholm
- 2011: (Germany) Hamburg
- 2012: (Spain) Vitoria-Gasteiz
- 2013: (France) Nantes
- 2014: (Denmark) Copenhagen
- 2015: (United Kingdom) Bristol
- 2016: (Slovenia) Ljubljana
- 2017: (Germany) Essen
- 2018: (Netherlands) Nijmegen
- 2019: (Norway) Oslo
- 2020: (Portugal) Lisbon
- 2021: (Finland) Lahti
- 2022: (France) Grenoble
- 2023: (Estonia) Tallinn
- 2024: (Spain) Valencia
- 2025: (Lithuania) Vilnius
- 2026: (Portugal) Guimarães
- 2027: (Germany) Heilbronn

== European Green Leaf ==
Following the success of the European Green Capital Award (EGCA), many smaller cities sought EU recognition for their efforts and commitment in the areas of sustainability & environment. In response, the European Commission launched a pilot European Green Leaf (EGL) initiative in 2015. The European Green Leaf's competition aims at cities between 20,000 and 100,000 inhabitants recognizing their commitment to better environmental outcomes, with a particular accent on efforts generating green growth and new jobs.

The objectives of the European Green Leaf are threefold:

- To recognise cities that demonstrate a good environmental record and commitment to generating green growth;
- To encourage cities to actively develop citizens' environmental awareness and involvement;
- To identify cities able to act as a 'green ambassador' and to encourage other cities to progress towards a better sustainability outcomes.

The European Green Leaf has been presented on an annual basis by the European Commission in conjunction with the European Green Capital Award from its conception in 2015 as a stamp of approval to Smaller Cities, Growing Greener!

=== Winners ===
- 2015: (Spain) Mollet del Vallès
- 2015: (Portugal) Torres Vedras
- 2017: (Republic of Ireland) Galway
- 2018: (Belgium) Leuven
- 2018: (Sweden) Växjö
- 2019: (Spain) Cornellà de Llobregat
- 2019: (Netherlands) Horst aan de Maas
- 2020: (Republic of Ireland) Limerick
- 2020: (Belgium) Mechelen
- 2021: (Finland) Lappeenranta
- 2021: (Bulgaria) Gabrovo
- 2022: (Portugal) Valongo
- 2022: (Netherlands) Winterswijk
- 2024: (Denmark) Helsingør
- 2024: (Slovenia) Velenje
- 2025: (Spain) Viladecans
- 2025: (Italy) Treviso
- 2026: (Portugal) Águeda
- 2026: (Finland) Vaasa

== See also ==
- European Capital of Culture
- European Youth Capital
- European Region of Gastronomy
- List of environmental awards
