= Clémentine Mélois =

French writer (born 1980)

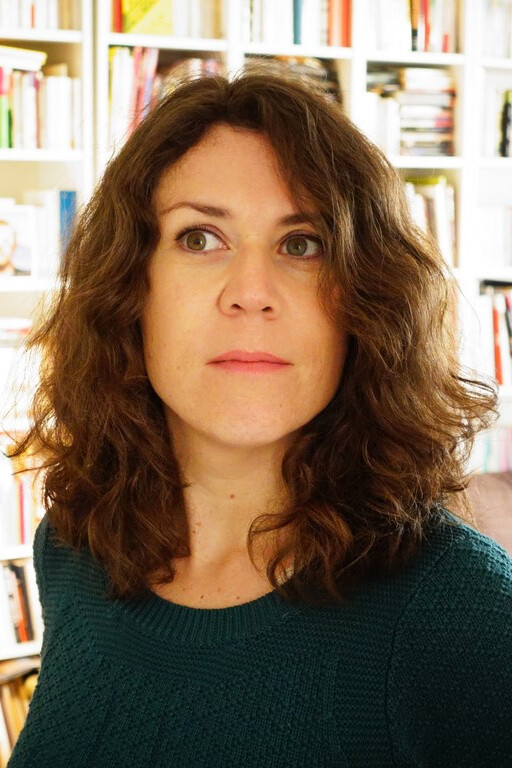
- Mélois, 2017
- Born: 15 June 1980 (age 46); La Ferté-Milon, France
- Education: Beaux-Arts de Paris
- Occupations: Artist; writer
- Spouse: Rudy Spiessert
- Writing career
- Movement: Oulipo (2017–2026)

Clémentine Mélois (born 15 June 1980) is a French artist and writer, known for her experimental and humorous works that combine visual art and literature. Mélois first gained attention with Cent titres (2014), a book of playful reinterpretations of the titles and covers of well-known books. Her subsequent works include the "found" novel Sinon j'oublie (2017), translated as Otherwise I Forget (2023), and Dehors, la tempête (2020), a non-fiction reflection on reading. In 2024 she published Alors c'est bien, a memoir about the death of her father which received several literary awards. Mélois was a member of the Oulipo experimental literary group between 2017 and 2026.

== Biography ==
Mélois was born on 15 June 1980 in La Ferté-Milon, France. Her mother was a teacher and photographer, and her father was sculptor Bernard Mélois. She has said that a defining moment in her childhood was winning a writing competition organised by Gallimard and receiving a prize of 365 books. She went to college in Villers-Cotterêts and later studied at the Beaux-Arts de Paris, where she took classes in printmaking and publishing. In 2008 she took up a teaching post at the Nîmes School of Fine Arts.

Mélois was a guest of honour of the experimental French literary group Oulipo in 2016, and subsequently joined the group in 2017. Her works incorporate both writing and visual arts, often in humorous ways. She has said she is inspired by writers such as Raymond Queneau and Georges Perec. From 2015 to 2018, she appeared on the radio programme Des Papous dans la tête hosted by France Culture.

Mélois's visual artistic work has been exhibited at the Galerie Lara Vincy in Paris, including two solo exhibitions in 2018 and 2020. Hervé Le Tellier wrote the introduction to the catalogue of her 2020 exhibition, Un cabinet d’amateur, which featured an assorted collection of books, paintings and objects portrayed as part of a collector's cabinet. She also participated in the Jean Giono exhibition at MuCEM in 2019/2020.

Mélois left Oulipo in May 2026, citing the group's difficulty integrating women as one of the reasons for her departure. As Oulipo's rules do not permit leaving the group except in the case of death, Mélois staged a pretend suicide at a café in Paris to announce her departure.

== Literary works ==
Mélois's first book, Cent titres, was published in 2014, with a foreword by Jacques Roubaud. In this work she playfully reinterprets the titles and covers of well-known classic novels in French. Mélois had initially created and posted some of these works on Facebook, before drawing the attention of a publisher. The title translates into English as "a hundred titles", but is also a pun on sans titre (untitled). The work was praised by critics for its humour and subversion.

In 2017 her novel Sinon j'oublie was published; it was subsequently translated into English by Terry Bradford and published as Otherwise I Forget in 2023. It is a "found" novel, combining photographs of shopping lists collected by Mélois with fictional accounts of their imagined authors. A review for France Info noted the way she used innocuous everyday objects to create literary art, and praised the work's lightheartedness and humour.

Dehors, la tempête, published in 2020, is a non-fiction work about Mélois's love of reading. A review in The French Review praised the entertaining and light nature of the work. Études noted her sense of humour and the way the book combined her love of literature with questions about the nature of people, contemporary beliefs and language. Terry Bradford's translation ("Outside, the Storm") was published in the US by Keruanserai Press in October 2026.

In 2024 Mélois published Alors c'est bien, a memoir about her father's death the previous year. It received the Prix Méduse in 2024, and the Eugène Dabit Prize and the Prix Marianne in 2025. A review in Le Monde described it as a tribute to life, told in a tender and sensitive way. Fabienne Pascaud, writing for Télérama, gives the work a four-star rating, and notes that Mélois also manages to include the voice of her father, by incorporating his own diary and notebooks into the text.

Mélois writes children's books which are illustrated by her partner Rudy Spiessert, including the Les Chiens pirates and Jean-Loup fait ses trucs series and Radio Banane.

== Selected works ==
- Cent titres (Grasset, 2014)
- Sinon j'oublie (2017), translated into English by Terry Bradford and published as Otherwise I Forget (Liverpool Press, 2023)
- Le roman-photo (Le Lombard, 2018), a graphic novel; drawings and colours by Mélois and text by Jan Baetens
- Dehors, la tempête (Grasset, 2020), translated into English by Terry Bradford and published as Outside, the Storm (Keruanserai Press, 2026)
- Les six fonctions de langage (Editions de Seuil, 2021), a graphic novel
- Bon pour un jour de légèreté (Grasset, 2020)
- Alors c'est bien (Gallimard, 2024)
