= European Region of Gastronomy =

Regional title

The European Region of Gastronomy is a title given every year to one or more cities or regions in Europe. The title is awarded by the International Institute of Gastronomy, Culture, Arts and Tourism (IGCAT).

For the year 2026, the title was awarded to the regions of Crete (Greece) and Kvarner (Croatia), highlighting their commitment to sustainable tourism and local food heritage.

Braga, Minho, Portugal (2016)

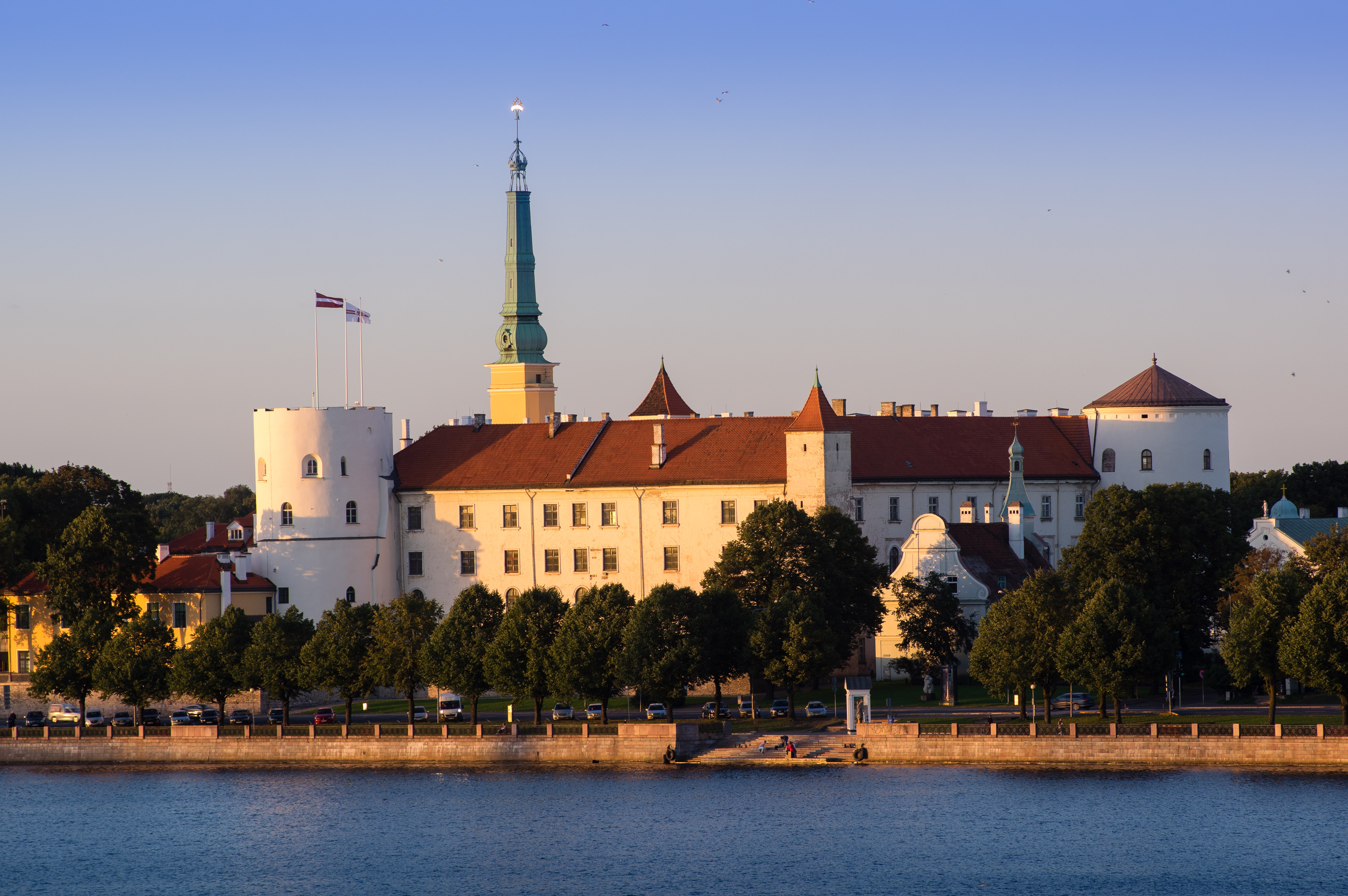
Riga, Latvia (2017)

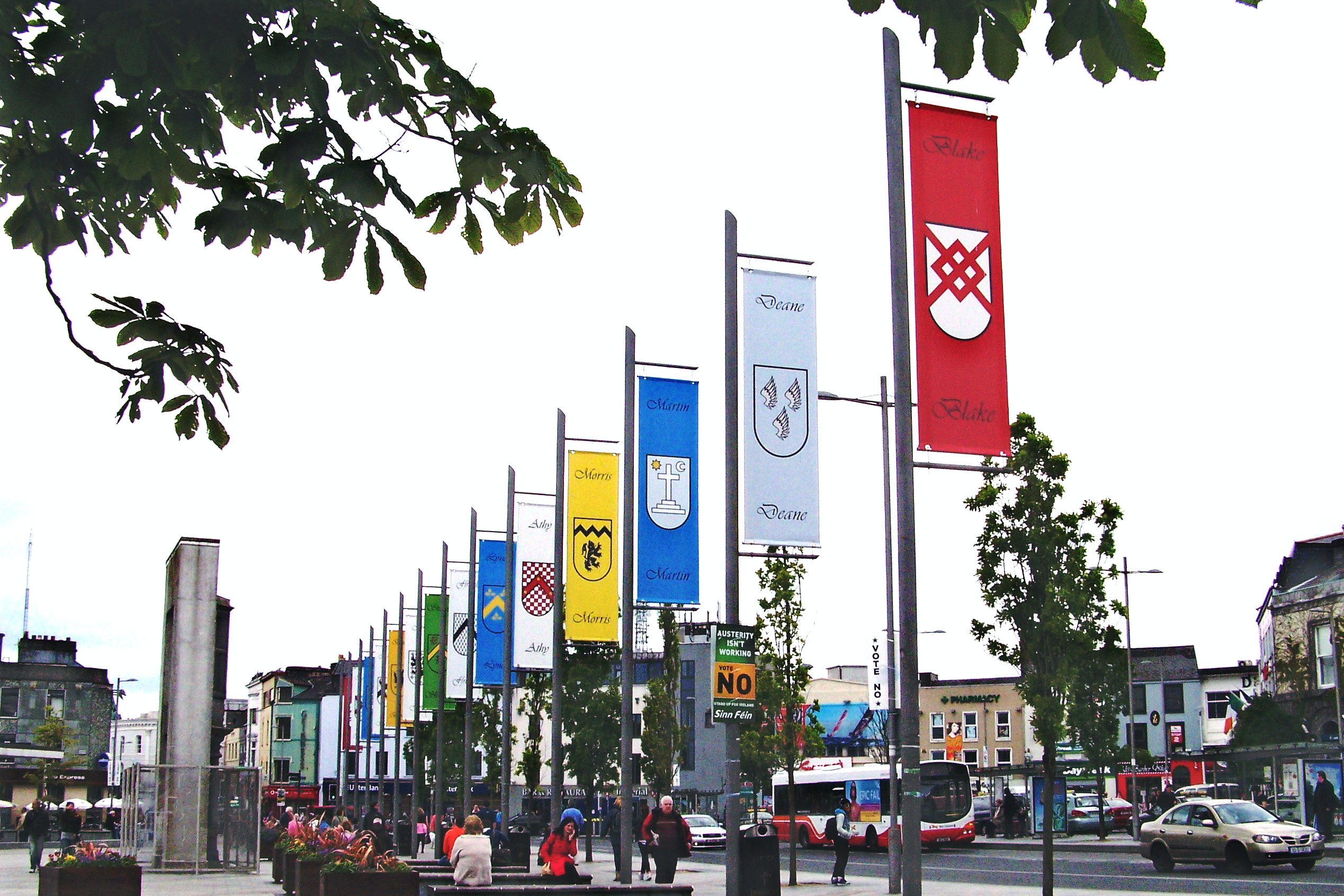
Galway, Ireland (2018)

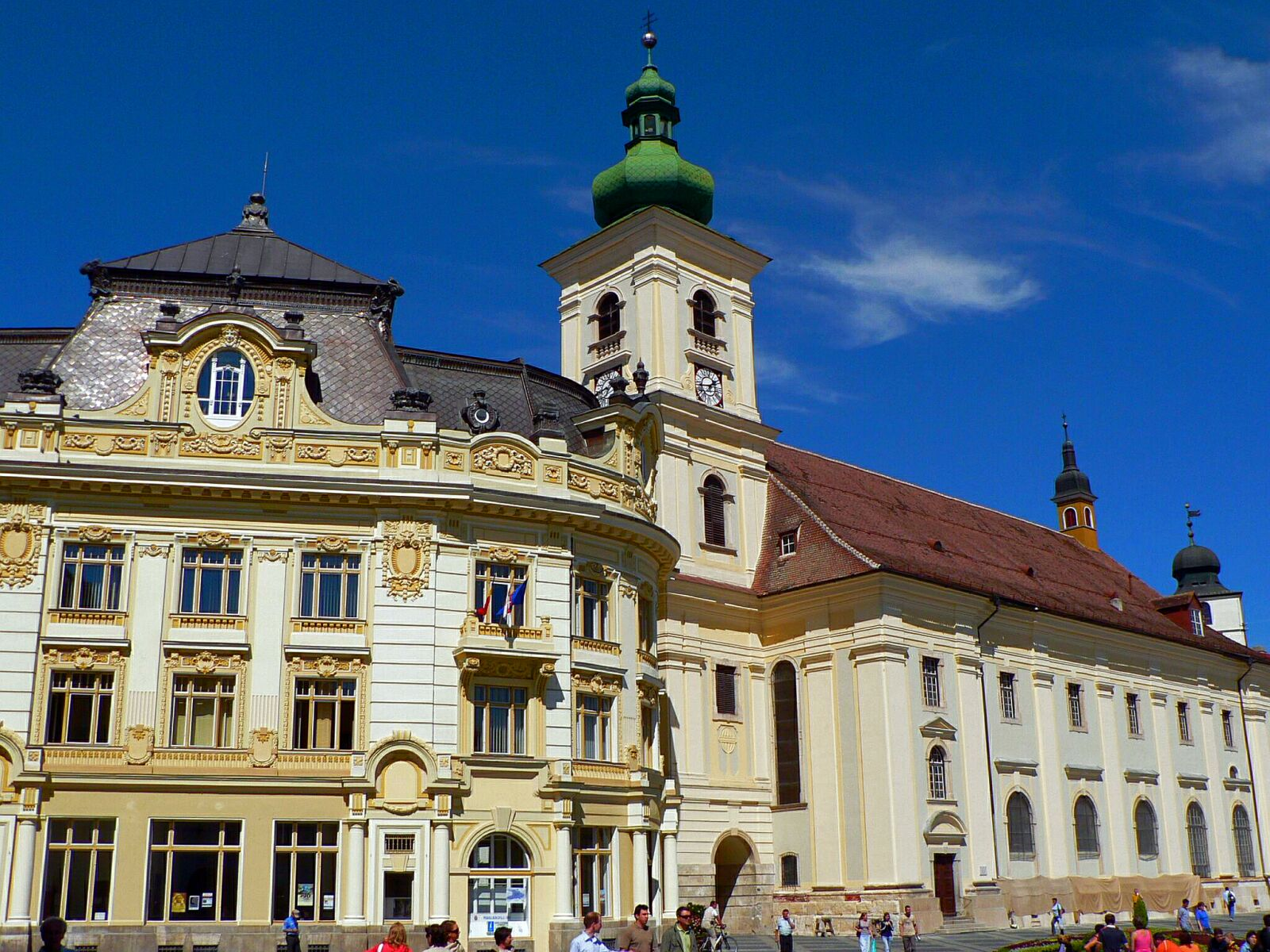
Sibiu, Romania (2019)

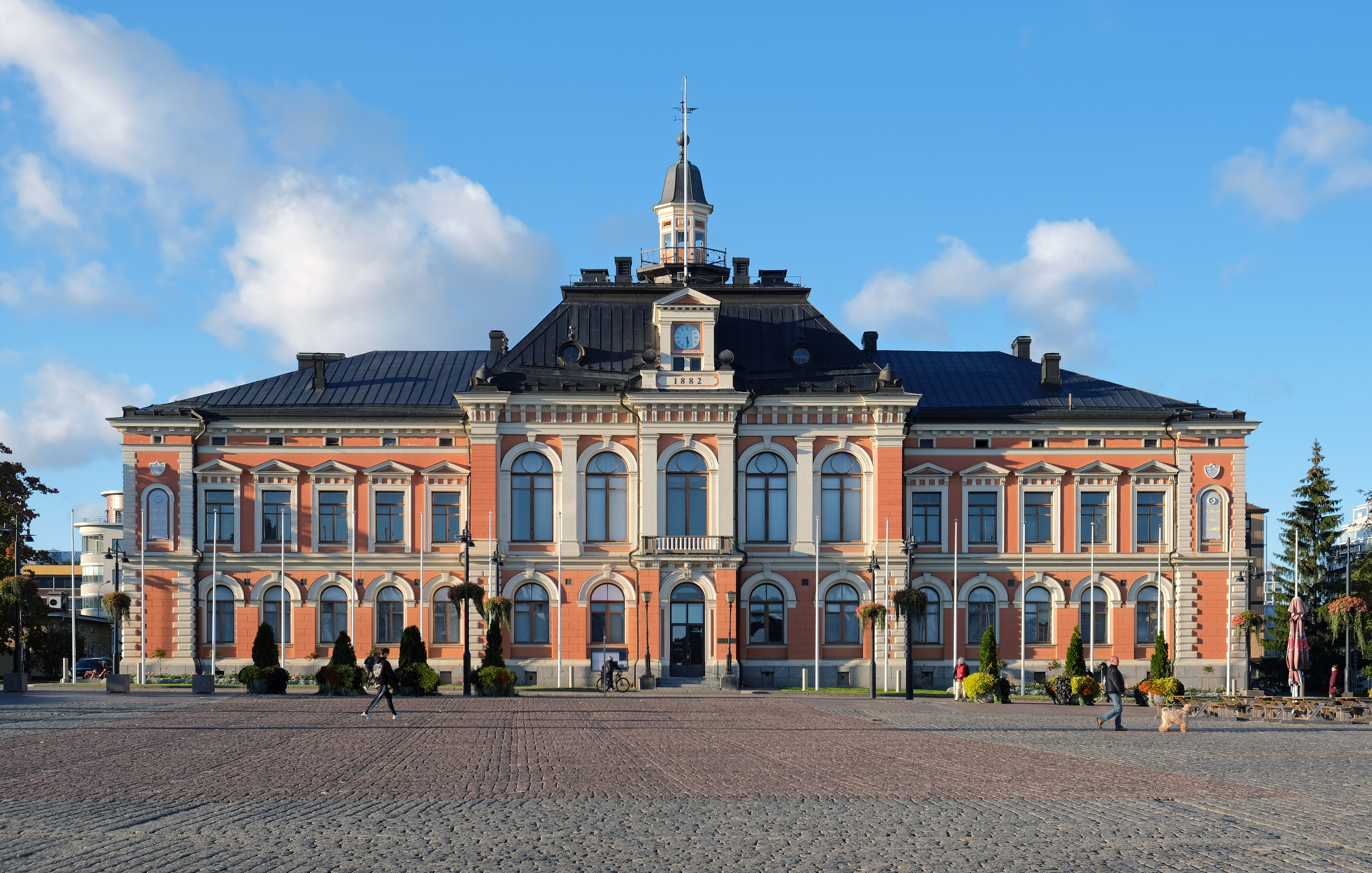
Kuopio, Finland (2020)

== Goals ==
The goal of the project is to contribute to the better quality of life by:

- raising awareness about the importance of cultural and food uniqueness
- stimulating creativity and gastronomic innovation
- educating for better nutrition
- improving sustainable tourism standards
- highlighting distinctive food cultures
- strengthening community well-being and supporting local SMEs

== List of European Regions of Gastronomy ==
European Regions of Gastronomy
Year	City/Region	Country	Notes	Links
2016	Minho	Portugal		Minho 2016
2016	Catalonia	Spain		Catalonia 2016
2017	Riga, Gauja	Latvia		Riga-Gauja 2017
2017	East Lombardy	Italy		East Lombardy 2017
2017	Aarhus, Central Denmark	Denmark		Aarhus-Central Denmark 2017
2018	North Brabant	Netherlands		North Brabant 2018
2018	Galway, Western Ireland	Ireland	Galway was also named the European Capital of Culture for 2020	Galway-West of Ireland 2018
2019	Sibiu	Romania	The Transylvanian town was also the European Capital of Culture in 2007	Sibiu 2019
2019	South Aegean	Greece		South Aegean 2019
2020	Kuopio	Finland	Also counts for 2021 because of the COVID-19 pandemic	Kuopio 2020-2021
2021	Coimbra	Portugal	Also counts for 2022 because of the COVID-19 pandemic	Coimbra 2021
2021	Slovenia	Slovenia	The only country to have been included as a whole so far	Slovenia 2021
2022	Trondheim, Trøndelag	Norway		Trondheim-Trøndelag 2022
2022	Menorca	Spain		Menorca 2022
2023	Hauts-de-France	France		Hauts-de-France 2023
2024	Saimaa lake region	Finland		Saimaa 2024
2025	Sicily	Italy		Sicily 2025
2026	Crete	Greece		Crete 2026
2026	Kvarner	Croatia		Kvarner 2026

== See also ==
- European Capital of Culture
- European Youth Capital
- European Green Capital Award
