= Albert-Marie Schmidt =

French linguist

Albert-Marie Schmidt (10 October 1901 – 8 February 1966) was a French linguist and one of the founding members of the Oulipo. In 1960, the three hundred and fiftieth anniversary of the birth of John Calvin, Schmidt wrote a comprehensive introduction to the life and work of Calvin that placed him in his proper historical perspective in the Protestant Reformation.
