= Julien Torma =

French writer, playwright and poet

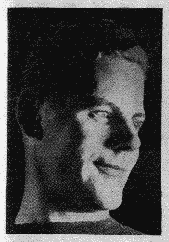
- Picture of Julien Torma
- Born: 6 April 1902; Cambrai, France
- Disappeared: 17 February 1933 (aged 30); Tyrol, Austria
- Occupations: Poet, writer, playwright
- Known for: Possibly never existing

Julien Torma (Cambrai, 6 April 1902 – Tyrol, 17 February 1933) was credited as a French writer, playwright and poet who was part of the Dadaist movement.

Torma disappeared in the mountains of the Tyrol at the age of 30. Due to his secretive behaviour and the impossibility of verifying the supposed details of his life (i.e. no living or known family members and every writer he supposedly knew having died long before the publication of his posthumous books – if they are by the author of the early books, no professional career, no fixed address, his body having never been recovered, etc.), it has been suggested by some, including Jean-François Jeandillou, that Torma's existence may be fictitious. His purported birthday, 6 April, is marked as "the birthday of pataphysics" in the "pataphysics calendar". The real writer who authored the first four publications and Porte battantes would have had to be using a pen name, as, according to the French institute for statistics INSEE, only three Torma births have been recorded in France since 1891, all between 1941 and 1965.

== Publications ==
- The Obscure Lamp (1919)
- The Big Troche (1925)
- Cuts (1926)
- Euphorisms (1926)

== Posthumous publications ==
- Lebordelamer (1955)
- Le Bétrou (1955)
- Porte Battante (1963)
- Grabuge (1998)
- Definitively incomplete writings (2003)

== See also ==
- List of people who disappeared
