= Mons 2015 =

Cultural project

Mons 2015 was a cultural project carried out by the city of Mons on the occasion of its designation, along with Plzeň, in the Czech Republic, as a European Capital of Culture in 2015. Its total budget was 70.5 million euros.

== History ==
The project began on 24 January 2015 with the opening celebration which more than 100,000 took part in. At this occasion, the royal couple inaugurated the exposition "Van Gogh in Borinage: The birth of an artist".

== Media commentary ==
Following the emergency dismantling of an architectural work by Arne Quinze – The Passenger – overlooking a traffic lane and intended to last five years, but which showed worrying signs of instability from the first weeks of its installation, the newspaper The Guardian strongly criticized the city of Mons in the context of its European capital of culture projects.

Designed with the collaboration of an independent control body and two engineering firms, a new version of this urban installation was rebuilt at the artist's expense in October of the same year.
