= Communist era =

A communist era is a sustained period of national government by a single party following the philosophy of Marxism–Leninism. Many countries have experienced such a period of communist rule.

== Current communist states ==
=== China ===
The Chinese Communist Party emerged as the dominant political entity in mainland China following the Chinese Civil War of 1927–1949. On October 1, 1949, Mao Zedong declared the People's Republic of China from atop Tiananmen.

=== Cuba ===
Following the 1953–1959 Cuban Revolution, the new government led by Fidel Castro transitioned the country into a one-party state, with all meaningful opposition media closed to transferred to state control by the end of 1960. In 1976 a national referendum ratified a new constitution, with 97.7% in favour, which secured the Communist Party's central role in governing Cuba.

=== Laos ===
Communist rule in Laos began in March 1975 after the Khmer Rouge army took power with the support of the North Vietnamese after the Fall of Saigon and the end of the Vietnam War. In December 1975 King Sisavang Vatthana was forced to abdicate and the Lao People's Democratic Republic was pronounced, and a very authoritarian system introduced – non-communist newspapers were closed, and a large-scale purge of the civil service, army and police was launched.

=== Vietnam ===
The Communist Party of Vietnam was created in 1930 but didn't come in to power until the Japanese occupation of Vietnam from 1940 to 1945. The Democratic Party of Vietnam was formed and, due to failed negotiations between anti-communist French, led to the First Indochina War. After the war, the Geneva Accord (1954) split the country in to a communist North (known as Democratic Republic of Vietnam) and an anti-communist South (Known as The State of Vietnam). This would lead to the Vietnam War and the withdrawal of anti-communist soldiers from the area.

== Current states with a history of communist rule ==
Communist Countries in 1979

=== Afghanistan ===
The Democratic Republic of Afghanistan was founded on April 30, 1978, following the Saur Revolution, a military coup led by the People's Democratic Party of Afghanistan (PDPA), overthrew the government of President Mohammed Daoud Khan, who had established a republic in 1973 after ending the monarchy. The People's Democratic Party of Afghanistan was supported by the Soviet Union through a series of internal power struggles, eventually collapsing in 1992 after the Soviet Union's dissolution.
