= European Capital of Culture =

Cities recognized by the European Union as culturally significant for Europe

The logo used by European Commission for European Capital of Culture

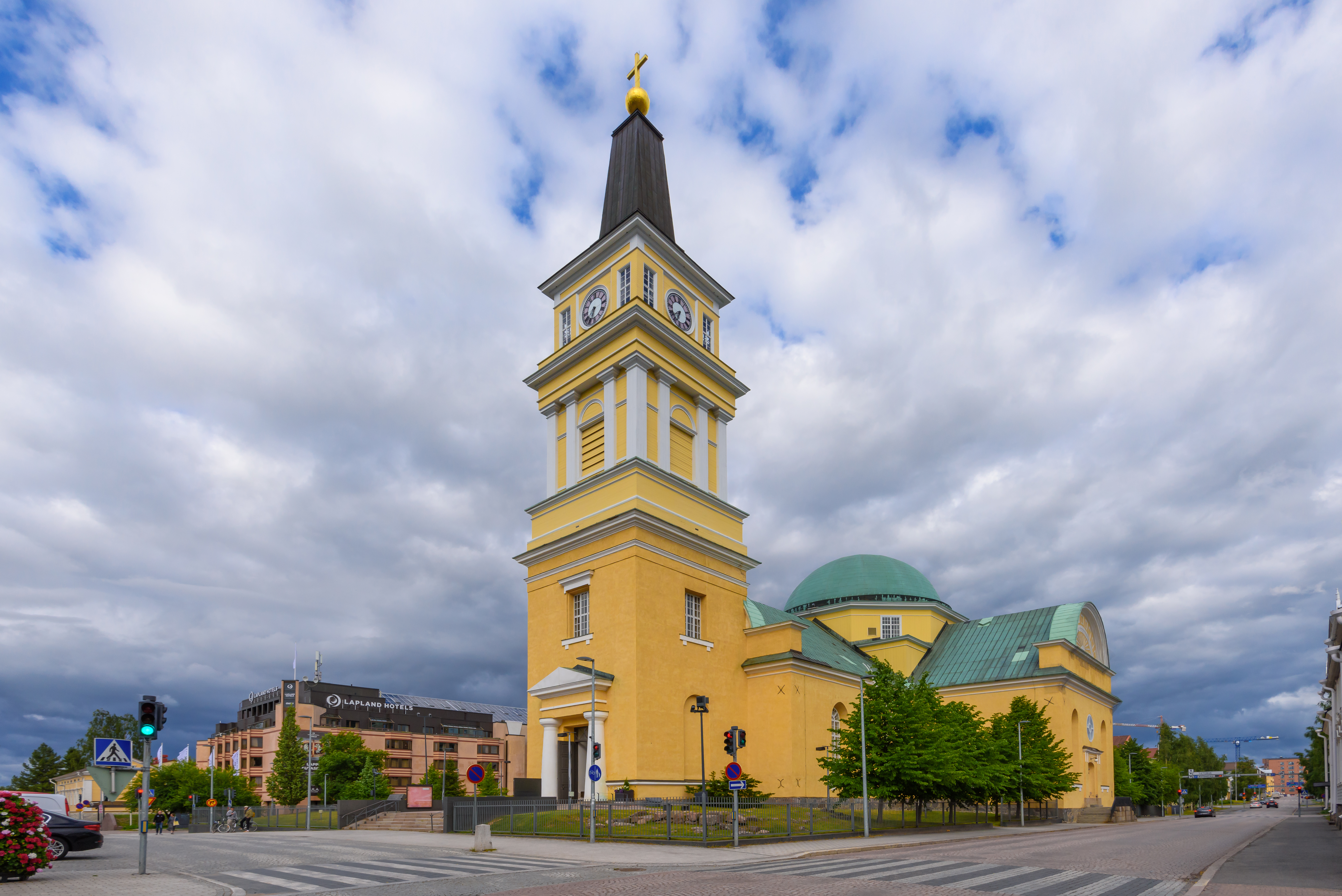
Oulu (Finland), European Capital of Culture for 2026

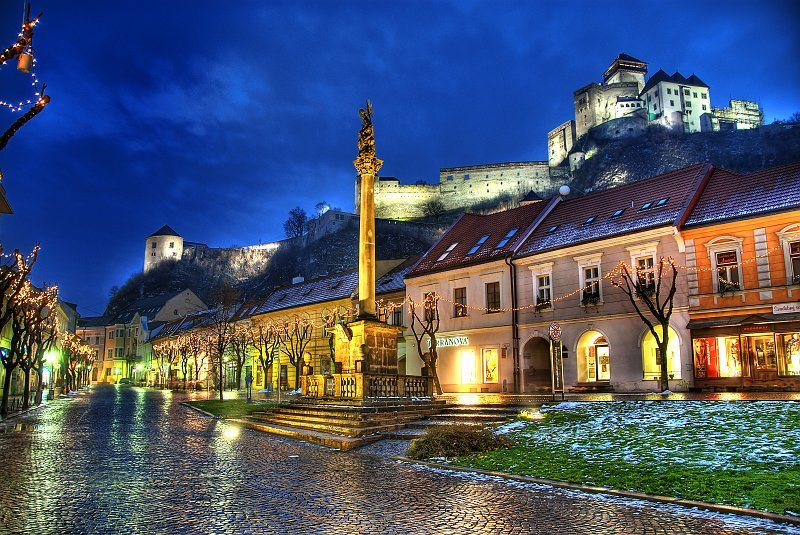
Trenčín (Slovakia), European Capital of Culture for 2026

A European Capital of Culture is a city designated by the European Union (EU) for a period of one calendar year during which it organises a series of cultural events with a strong pan-European dimension. Being a European Capital of Culture can be an opportunity for a city to generate considerable cultural, social, and economic benefits, and it can help foster urban regeneration, change the city's image, and raise its visibility and profile on an international scale. Multiple cities can be a European Capital of Culture simultaneously.

In 1985, Melina Mercouri, Greece's Minister of Culture, and her French counterpart Jack Lang came up with the idea of designating an annual City of Culture to bring Europeans closer together by highlighting the richness and diversity of European cultures and raising awareness of their common history and values.

The Commission of the European Union manages the title, and each year the Council of Ministers of the European Union formally designates European Capitals of Culture: more than 60 cities have been designated so far. The current European Capitals of Culture for 2026 are Oulu in Finland and Trenčín in Slovakia.

== Selection process ==
An international panel of cultural experts is in charge of assessing the proposals of cities for the title according to criteria specified by the European Union.

For two of the capitals each year, eligibility is open to cities in EU member states only. From 2021 and every three years thereafter, a third capital will be chosen from cities in countries that are candidates or potential candidates for membership, or in countries that are part of the European Economic Area (EEA)– an example of the latter being Stavanger, Norway, which was a European Capital of Culture in 2008.

A 2004 study conducted for the commission, known as the "Palmer report", demonstrated that the choice of European Capital of Culture served as a catalyst for cultural development and the transformation of the city. Consequently, the beneficial socio-economic development and impact for the chosen city are now also considered in determining the chosen cities.

Bids from five United Kingdom cities to be the 2023 Capital of Culture were disqualified in November 2017, because the UK was planning to leave the EU before 2023.

== History ==
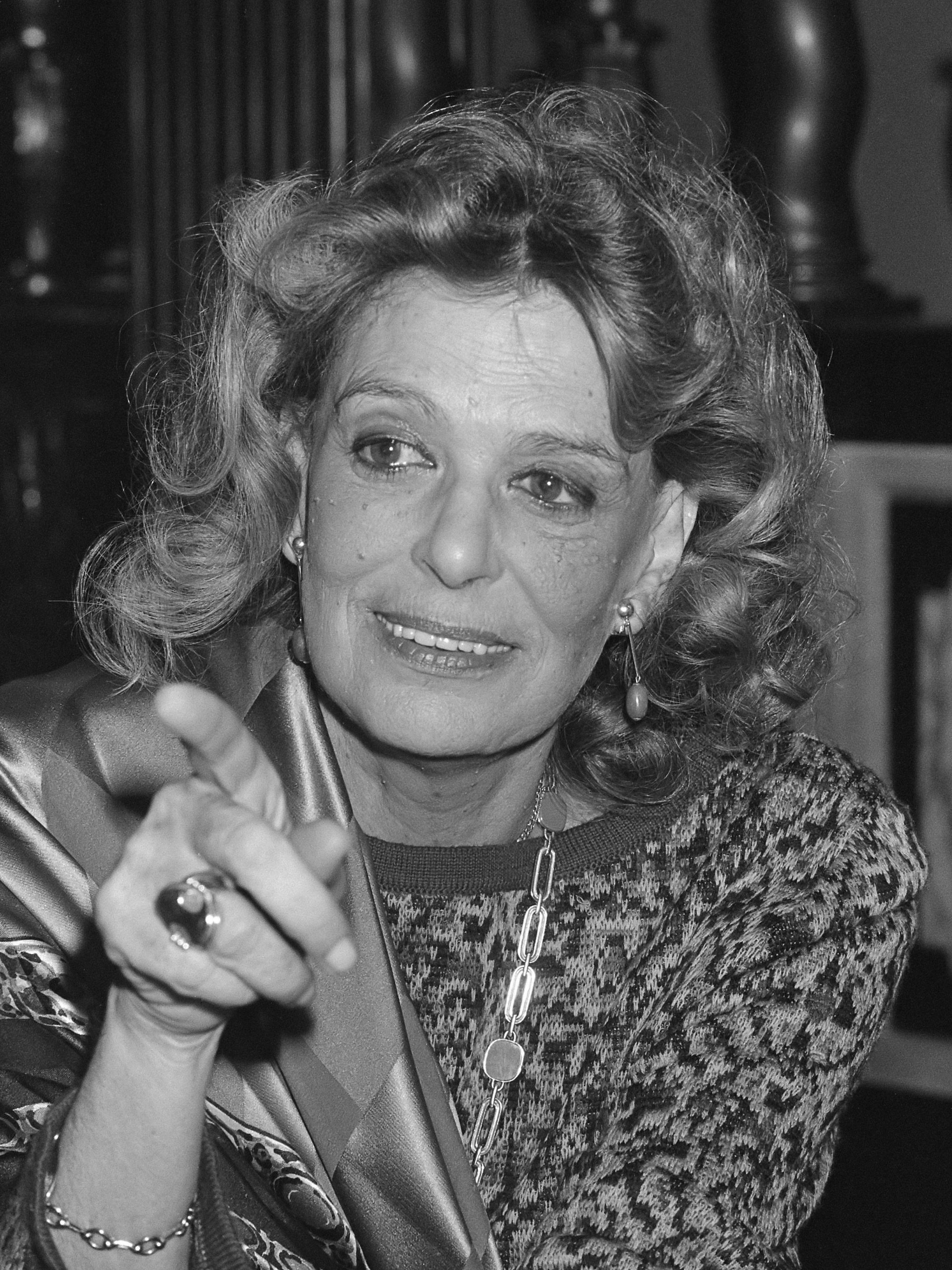
Melina Mercouri

The European Capital of Culture programme was initially called the European City of Culture and was conceived in 1983, by Melina Mercouri, then serving as minister of culture in Greece. Mercouri believed that at the time, culture was not given the same attention as politics and economics and a project for promoting European cultures within the member states should be pursued.

The European City of Culture programme was launched in the summer of 1985 with Athens being the first title-holder. In 1999, the European City of Culture program was renamed to European Capital of Culture.

== List of European Capitals of Culture ==
Year	City	Country	Notes/Links	Candidate cities
1985	Athens	Greece		
1986	Florence	Italy		
1987	Amsterdam	Netherlands		
1988	West Berlin	West Germany	City under Western Allied occupation until 1990; territory was claimed by the Federal Republic of Germany. The name "European City of Culture" was used instead of "Capital" in order to not provoke the East German government.	
1989	Paris	France		
1990	Glasgow	United Kingdom	Glasgow Garden Festival	
1991	Dublin	Ireland		
1992	Madrid	Spain		
1993	Antwerp	Belgium		
1994	Lisbon	Portugal		
1995	Luxembourg City	Luxembourg		
1996	Copenhagen	Denmark		
1997	Thessaloniki	Greece		
1998	Stockholm	Sweden		
1999	Weimar	Germany		
2000	Avignon	France	The year 2000 was called the millennium year and treated in a special way, in order to emphasize the enduring heritage and contribution of European cities to world culture and civilization. Because of that, nine locations were chosen, including two cities of states that were to join the EU on 1 May 2004.	
2000	Bergen	Norway	The year 2000 was called the millennium year and treated in a special way, in order to emphasize the enduring heritage and contribution of European cities to world culture and civilization. Because of that, nine locations were chosen, including two cities of states that were to join the EU on 1 May 2004.	
2000	Bologna	Italy	The year 2000 was called the millennium year and treated in a special way, in order to emphasize the enduring heritage and contribution of European cities to world culture and civilization. Because of that, nine locations were chosen, including two cities of states that were to join the EU on 1 May 2004.	
2000	Brussels	Belgium	The year 2000 was called the millennium year and treated in a special way, in order to emphasize the enduring heritage and contribution of European cities to world culture and civilization. Because of that, nine locations were chosen, including two cities of states that were to join the EU on 1 May 2004.	
2000	Helsinki	Finland	The year 2000 was called the millennium year and treated in a special way, in order to emphasize the enduring heritage and contribution of European cities to world culture and civilization. Because of that, nine locations were chosen, including two cities of states that were to join the EU on 1 May 2004.	
2000	Kraków	Poland	The year 2000 was called the millennium year and treated in a special way, in order to emphasize the enduring heritage and contribution of European cities to world culture and civilization. Because of that, nine locations were chosen, including two cities of states that were to join the EU on 1 May 2004.	
2000	Prague	Czech Republic	The year 2000 was called the millennium year and treated in a special way, in order to emphasize the enduring heritage and contribution of European cities to world culture and civilization. Because of that, nine locations were chosen, including two cities of states that were to join the EU on 1 May 2004.	
2000	Reykjavík	Iceland	The year 2000 was called the millennium year and treated in a special way, in order to emphasize the enduring heritage and contribution of European cities to world culture and civilization. Because of that, nine locations were chosen, including two cities of states that were to join the EU on 1 May 2004.	
2000	Santiago de Compostela	Spain	The year 2000 was called the millennium year and treated in a special way, in order to emphasize the enduring heritage and contribution of European cities to world culture and civilization. Because of that, nine locations were chosen, including two cities of states that were to join the EU on 1 May 2004.	
2001	Porto	Portugal		
2001	Rotterdam	Netherlands		
2002	Bruges	Belgium		
2002	Salamanca	Spain		
2003	Graz	Austria		
2004	Genoa	Italy		
2004	Lille	France		
2005	Cork	Ireland	Cork Caucus	Galway, Limerick, Waterford
2006	Patras	Greece		
2007	Luxembourg City	Luxembourg		
2007	Sibiu	Romania		
2008	Liverpool	United Kingdom		Birmingham, Bristol, Cardiff, Newcastle and Gateshead (joint bid), Oxford
2008	Stavanger	Norway		
2009	Linz	Austria	Linz 2009	
2009	Vilnius	Lithuania		
2010	Essen	Germany	Representing the whole Ruhr as Ruhr.2010.	Braunschweig, Bremen, Görlitz, Halle an der Saale, Karlsruhe, Kassel, Lübeck, Potsdam, Regensburg
2010	Istanbul	Turkey		
2010	Pécs	Hungary		
2011	Tallinn	Estonia		
2011	Turku	Finland	Turku 2011	
2012	Guimarães	Portugal		
2012	Maribor	Slovenia		
2013	Košice	Slovakia	Košice 2013	
2013	Marseille	France	Marseille-Provence 2013	Bordeaux, Lyon, Toulouse
2014	Riga	Latvia		
2014	Umeå	Sweden		
2015	Mons	Belgium	Mons 2015	
2015	Plzeň	Czech Republic		
2016	San Sebastián	Spain	Donostia/San Sebastián 2016 (Donostia 2016)	Burgos, Córdoba, Las Palmas de Gran Canaria, Segovia, Zaragoza
2016	Wrocław	Poland		Gdańsk, Katowice, Lublin, Warsaw
2017	Aarhus	Denmark	Aarhus 2017	Sønderborg
2017	Paphos	Cyprus	Pafos 2017	Limassol, Nicosia
2018	Leeuwarden	Netherlands		Eindhoven, Maastricht, The Hague, Utrecht
2018	Valletta	Malta	Valletta 2018	
2019	Matera	Italy	Matera 2019	Cagliari, Lecce, Perugia, Ravenna, Siena
2019	Plovdiv	Bulgaria	Plovdiv 2019	Sofia, Varna, Veliko Turnovo
2020 – April 2021	Galway	Ireland	Galway 2020	Limerick, The Three Sisters (joint bid Waterford, Wexford, Kilkenny)
2020 – April 2021	Rijeka	Croatia	Rijeka 2020	Dubrovnik, Osijek, Pula
2022	Esch-sur-Alzette	Luxembourg	Esch-sur-Alzette 2022	
2022	Kaunas	Lithuania	Kaunas 2022	Klaipėda
2022	Novi Sad	Serbia	Novi Sad 2022 (Coronavirus postponement)	
2023^{1}	Eleusis	Greece	Eleusis 2023 (Coronavirus postponement)	Kalamata, Rhodes
2023^{1}	Timișoara	Romania	Timișoara 2023 (Coronavirus postponement)	Baia Mare, Bucharest, Cluj-Napoca
2023^{1}	Veszprém	Hungary	Veszprém 2023	Debrecen, Győr
2024	Bad Ischl	Austria	Salzkammergut 2024	Dornbirn, St. Pölten
2024	Bodø^{2}	Norway	Bodø 2024	Banja Luka, Mostar
2024	Tartu	Estonia	Tartu 2024	Kuressaare, Narva
2025	Chemnitz	Germany	Chemnitz 2025	Hannover, Hildesheim, Magdeburg, Nuremberg
2025	Nova Gorica/Gorizia joint bid	Slovenia; Italy	GO! 2025	Ljubljana, Piran, Ptuj
2026	Oulu	Finland	Oulu 2026 (Theme: "Cultural Climate Change")	Savonlinna, Tampere
2026	Trenčín	Slovakia	Trenčín 2026 (Theme: "Cultivating Curiosity")	Nitra, Žilina
2027	Évora	Portugal	Évora 2027	Aveiro, Braga, Ponta Delgada
2027	Liepāja	Latvia	Liepāja 2027	Daugavpils, Valmiera
2028	Bourges	France	Bourges 2028	Clermont-Ferrand, Montpellier, Rouen, Saint-Denis
2028	České Budějovice	Czech Republic	České Budějovice 2028	Broumov, Brno, Liberec
2028	Skopje^{2}	North Macedonia	Skopje 2028	Budva
2029	Kiruna	Sweden	Kiruna 2029	Uppsala
2029	Lublin	Poland	Lublin 2029	Bielsko-Biała, Katowice, Kołobrzeg
2030	Larnaca	Cyprus	Larnaca 2030	Limassol, Nicosia
2030	Leuven	Belgium	Leuven 2030	Molenbeek, Namur, Bruges, Ghent, Kortrijk
2030	Nikšić	Montenegro	Nikšić 2030	Lviv
2031	Victoria	Malta	Victoria 2031	Birgu
2031	TBA 3 December 2026	Spain		shortlisted: Cáceres, Granada, Las Palmas de Gran Canaria, Oviedo eliminated: Burgos, Jerez de la Frontera, Palma, Potries, Toledo
2032	TBA in 2028	Bulgaria		shortlisted: Burgas, Veliko Tarnovo-Gabrovo
2032	TBA end-2027	Denmark		shortlisted: Aalborg, Elsinore
2033	TBA	Netherlands	bid invitation bid deadline: 1 September 2027	potential candidates: Den Haag, Heerlen, Nijmegen, Groningen
2033	TBA	Italy		potential candidates: Turin, Pesaro/Urbino, Viterbo
2033	TBA^{2}	TBA		

^{1} The European Capital of Culture was due to be in the UK in 2023. However, due to its decision to leave the European Union, UK cities would no longer be eligible to hold the title after 2019. The European Commission's Scotland office confirmed that this would be the case on 23 November 2017, only one week before the UK was due to announce which city would be put forward. The candidate cities were Dundee, Leeds, Milton Keynes, Nottingham and a joint bid from Northern Irish cities of Belfast and Derry and the town of Strabane.

^{2} A new framework makes it possible for cities in candidate countries (Albania, Bosnia and Herzegovina, Georgia, Moldova, Montenegro, North Macedonia, Serbia, Turkey, Ukraine), potential candidates for EU membership (Kosovo) or EFTA member states (Iceland, Liechtenstein, Norway, Switzerland) to hold the title every third year as of 2021. This will be selected through an open competition, meaning that cities from various countries may compete with each other.

Locations of European Capitals of Culture. Green designates current cities; red is for past cities; and blue for future cities.

== See also ==
- American Capital of Culture – Latin American and Caribbean initiative
- Arab Capital of Culture – Arab League effort to promote and celebrate Arab culture
- European Green Capital Award – Award for a European city based on its environmental record
- European Youth Capital – One year city award
- European Region of Gastronomy – Regional title
- UK City of Culture – Cultural designation in the United Kingdom
- University Network of the European Capitals of Culture – International non-profit association
