= Bouts-Rimés =

Poetic game

Bouts-rimés (French, literally 'rhymed-ends') is a poetic game defined by Addison in the Spectator as "lists of words that rhyme to one another, drawn up by another hand, and given to a poet, who was to make a poem to the rhymes in the same order that they were placed upon the list".

The more odd and perplexing the rhymes are, the more ingenuity is required to give a semblance of common sense to the production. For instance, the rhyme scheme breeze, elephant, squeeze, pant, scant, please, hope, pope is submitted, and the following stanza is the result:

Escaping from the Indian breeze,
The vast, sententious elephant
Through groves of sandal loves to squeeze
And in their fragrant shade to pant;
Although the shelter there be scant,
The vivid odours soothe and please,
And while he yields to dreams of hope,
Adoring beasts surround their Pope.

The invention of bouts-rimés is attributed to a minor French poet of the 17th century named Dulot, of whom little else is remembered. According to the Menagiana, about the year 1648, Dulot was complaining one day that he had been robbed of a number of valuable papers, and, in particular, of three hundred sonnets. Surprise being expressed at his having written so many, Dulot explained that they were all blank sonnets, that is to say, that he had put down the rhymes and nothing else. The idea struck everyone as amusing, and what Dulot had done seriously was taken up as a jest. Bouts-rimés became the fashion, and in 1654 Jean François Sarrazin composed a satire against them, entitled La Défaite des bouts-rimés ('The defeat of the rhymed-ends'), which enjoyed a great success. Nevertheless, they continued to be abundantly composed in France throughout the 17th century and a great part of the 18th century.

The Academy of Toulouse contributed to the vitality of bouts-rimés by holding an annual contest of 14-line poems in honor of King Louis XIV; the victorious sonnet was rewarded with a medal. An instance of this is the following one, filled out by Jean Commire:

Tout est grand dans le Roi, l'aspect seul de son buste	Everything is great about the king; the mere aspect of his bust
Rend nos fiers ennemis plus froids que des glaçons:	turns our proud enemies colder than ice:
Et Guillaume n'attend que le temps des moissons,	and William is only awaiting harvest-time,
Pour se voir succomber sous un bras si robuste.	to see himself succumb under so robust an arm.
Qu'on ne nous vaute plus les miracles d'Auguste;	Let nobody vaunt to us the miracles of Augustus;
Louis de bien régnir lui feroit des leçons:	Louis would teach him lessons in good governance:
Horace en vain l'égale aux dieux dans ses chansons.	Horace vainly likens him to the gods in his songs.
Moins que n'est mon héros, il étoit sage et juste, etc.	No less than my hero, he was wise and just; etc.

In 1701 Etienne Mallemans (d. 1716) published a collection of serious sonnets, all written to rhymes selected for him by the duchess of Maine. Neither Piron, nor Marmontel, nor La Motte disdained this ingenious exercise, and early in the 19th century the fashion was revived. The most curious incident, however, in the history of bouts-rimés is the fact that the elder Alexandre Dumas, in 1864, took them under his protection. He issued an invitation to all the poets of France to display their skill by composing to sets of rhymes selected for the purpose by the poet, Joseph Méry (1798-1866). No fewer than 350 writers responded to the appeal, and Dumas published the result, as a volume, in 1865.

W. M. Rossetti, in the memoir of his brother prefixed to Dante Gabriel Rossetti's Collected Works (1886), mentions that, especially in 1848 and 1849, he and Rossetti constantly practised their pens in writing sonnets to bouts-rimés, each giving the other the rhymes for a sonnet, and Dante Gabriel writing off these exercises in verse-making at the rate of a sonnet in five or eight minutes. Most of W. M. Rossetti's poems in The Germ were bouts-rimés experiments. Many of Dante Gabriel's, a little touched-up, remained in his brother's possession, but were not included in the Collected Works. Their sister, Christina Rossetti, was considered particularly good. Dante prized the following sonnet she had composed in this fashion:

Methinks the ills of life I fain would shun;
But then I must shun life, which is a blank.
Even in my childhood oft my spirit sank,
Thinking of all that had still to be done.
Among my many friends there is not one
Like her with whom I sat upon the bank
Willow-o'ershadowed, from whose lips I drank
A love more pure than streams that sing and run.
But many times that joy has cost a sigh;
And many times I in my heart have sought
For the old comfort and not found it yet.
Surely in that calm day when I shall die
The painful thought will be a blessed thought
And I shall sorrow that I must forget.
