= Heterotopia =

Heterotopia may refer to:

- Heterotopia (medicine), the displacement of an organ from its normal position
- Heterotopia (space), a concept of "other spaces" created by the philosopher Michel Foucault
- Heterotopia (ballet) of 2006 by William Forsythe
- "Heterotopia" (song) of 2017 by music duo Oliver featuring Yelle

== See also ==
- Heterotopy
