= Oulipo =

French literary movement

Oulipo (French pronunciation: [ulipo], short for French: Ouvroir de littérature potentielle; roughly translated as "workshop of potential literature", stylized OuLiPo) is a loose gathering of (mainly) French-speaking writers and mathematicians who seek to create works using constrained writing techniques. It was founded in 1960 by Raymond Queneau and François Le Lionnais. Other notable members have included novelists Georges Perec and Italo Calvino, poets Oskar Pastior and Jean Lescure, and poet/mathematician Jacques Roubaud.

The group defines the term littérature potentielle as (rough translation): "the seeking of new structures and patterns which may be used by writers in any way they enjoy". The group has therefore defined a series of literary methods and documented how they work, so that others can replicate and adapt these constraints. Queneau described Oulipians as "rats who construct the labyrinth from which they plan to escape."

Constraints are used as a means of triggering ideas and inspiration, most notably Perec's "story-making machine", which he used in the construction of Life: A User's Manual. As well as established techniques, such as lipograms (Perec's novel A Void) and palindromes, the group devises new methods, often based on mathematical problems, such as the knight's tour of the chessboard and permutations.

== History ==
Oulipo was founded on November 24, 1960, as a subcommittee of the Collège de 'Pataphysique and titled Séminaire de littérature expérimentale. At their second meeting, the group changed its name to Ouvroir de littérature potentielle, or Oulipo, at Albert-Marie Schmidt's suggestion. The idea had arisen two months earlier, when a small group met in September at Cerisy-la-Salle for a colloquium on Queneau's work. During this seminar, Queneau and François Le Lionnais conceived the society.

During the subsequent decade, Oulipo (as it was commonly known) was only rarely visible as a group. As a subcommittee, they reported their work to the full Collège de 'Pataphysique in 1961. In addition, Temps Mêlés (in French) devoted an issue to Oulipo in 1964, and Belgian radio broadcast one Oulipo meeting. Its members were individually active during these years and published works which were created within their constraints. The group as a whole began to emerge from obscurity in 1973 with the publication of La Littérature Potentielle, a collection of representative pieces. Martin Gardner helped to popularize the group in America when he featured Oulipo in his February 1977 Mathematical Games column in Scientific American. In 2012 Harvard University Press published a history of the movement, Many Subtle Channels: In Praise of Potential Literature, by Oulipo member Daniel Levin Becker.

Oulipo was founded by a group of men in 1960 and it took 15 years before the first woman was allowed to join; this was Michèle Métail who became a member in 1975 and has since distanced herself from the group. Since 1960 only seven women have joined Oulipo, with Clémentine Mélois joining in June 2017 and Louise Rose in 2026. Mélois left Oulipo in May 2026, citing the group's difficulty integrating women as one reason for her departure. As Oulipo's rules do not permit leaving the group except in the case of death, Mélois staged a pretend suicide at a café in Paris to announce her departure.

One extension of the group is Alamo (Atelier de Littérature Assistée par la Mathématique et les Ordinateurs, or Workshop for Literature Assisted by Mathematics and Computers) founded in July 1981 by Paul Braffort and Jacques Roubaud.

== Oulipian works ==
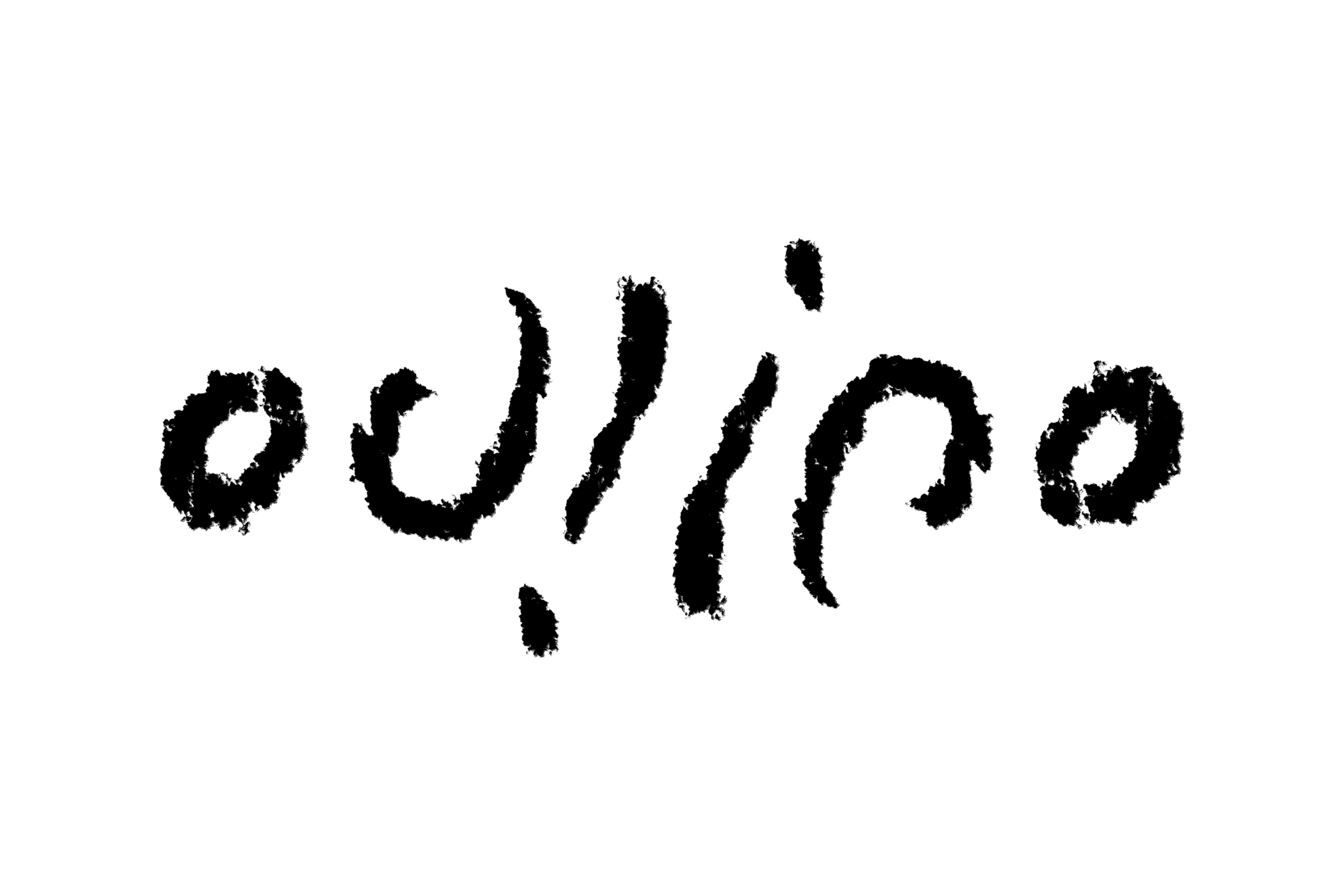
Ambigram Oulipo

Some examples of Oulipian writing:

- Queneau's Exercices de Style is the recounting ninety-nine times of the same inconsequential episode, in which a man witnesses a minor altercation on a bus trip; each account is unique in terms of tone and style.
- Queneau's Cent Mille Milliards de Poèmes is inspired by children's picture books in which each page is cut into horizontal strips that can be turned independently, allowing different pictures (usually of people: heads, torsos, waists, legs, etc.) to be combined in many ways. Queneau applies this technique to poetry: the book contains 10 sonnets, each on a page. Each page is split into 14 strips, one for each line. The author estimates in the introductory explanation that it would take approximately 200 million years to read all possible combinations.
- Perec's novel La Disparition, translated into English by Gilbert Adair and published under the title A Void, is a 300-page novel written without the letter "e", an example of a lipogram. The English translation, A Void, is also a lipogram. The novel is remarkable not only for the absence of "e", but it is a mystery in which the absence of that letter is a central theme. Perec would go on to write with the inverse constraint in Les Revenentes, with "e" the only vowel present in the work. Ian Monk would later translate Les Revenentes into English under the title The Exeter Text: Jewels, Secrets, Sex.
- Singular Pleasures by Harry Mathews describes 61 different scenes, each told in a different style (generally poetic, elaborate, or circumlocutory) in which 61 different people (all of different ages, nationalities, and walks of life) masturbate.

== Constraints ==
Some Oulipian constraints:

S+7, sometimes called N+7
Replace every noun in a text with the seventh noun after it in a dictionary. For example, "Call me Ishmael. Some years ago..." becomes "Call me Ishmael. Some yes-men ago...". Results will vary depending upon the dictionary used. This technique can also be performed on other lexical classes, such as verbs.

Snowball, or a Rhopalism
A poem in which each line is a single word, and each successive word is one letter longer.

Stile
A method wherein each "new" sentence in a paragraph stems from the last word or phrase in the previous sentence (e.g. "I descend the long ladder brings me to the ground floor is spacious…"). In this technique the sentences in a narrative continually overlap, often turning the grammatical object in a previous sentence into the grammatical subject of the next. The author may also pivot on an adverb, prepositional phrase, or other transitory moment.

Lipogram
Writing that excludes one or more letters. The previous sentence is a lipogram in B, F, J, K, Q, V, Y, and Z (it does not contain any of those letters).

Prisoner's constraint, also called Macao constraint
A type of lipogram that omits letters with ascenders and descenders (b, d, f, g, h, j, k, l, p, q, t, and y).

Palindromes
Sonnets and other poems constructed using palindromic techniques.

Eodermdrome
Use of words constructed from a set of letters in such a way that they have a non-planar spelling net.

Univocalism
A poem using only one vowel letter. In English and some other languages the same vowel letter can represent different sounds, which means that, for example, "born" and "cot" could both be used in a univocalism. (Words with the same American English vowel sound but represented by different 'vowel' letters could not be used – e.g. "blue" and "stew".)

Pilish
A method of writing wherein one matches the length of words (or number of words in a sentence) to the digits of pi.

Mathews' Algorithm
Elements in a text are moved around by a set of predetermined rules

== Members ==
=== Founding members ===
The founding members of Oulipo represented a range of intellectual pursuits, including writers, university professors, mathematicians, engineers, and "pataphysicians."

=== Living members ===
- Valérie Beaudouin
- Marcel Bénabou
- Eduardo Berti
- Bernard Cerquiglini
- Samuel Deshayes
- Frédéric Forte
- Paul Fournel
- Anne F. Garréta
- Jacques Jouet
- Hervé Le Tellier
- Étienne Lécroart
- Daniel Levin Becker
- Guillaume Marie
- Pablo Martín Sánchez
- Michèle Métail
- Louise Rose
- Olivier Salon

=== Deceased and former members ===
- Noël Arnaud
- Michèle Audin
- Jacques Bens
- Claude Berge
- André Blavier
- Paul Braffort
- Italo Calvino
- François Caradec
- Ross Chambers
- Stanley Chapman
- Marcel Duchamp
- Jacques Duchateau
- Luc Etienne
- Michelle Grangaud
- Emmanuel Peillet ("Latis")
- François Le Lionnais
- Jean Lescure
- Harry Mathews
- Clémentine Mélois
- Ian Monk
- Oskar Pastior
- Georges Perec
- Raymond Queneau
- Jean Queval
- Pierre Rosenstiehl
- Jacques Roubaud
- Albert-Marie Schmidt

== See also ==
- La Bibliothèque oulipienne
- Anticipatory plagiarism
- One-letter word
- E-Prime
- Modernist poetry
- Ouxpo
- Outrapo
- Ougrapo
- Oubapo
