= European Youth Capital =

One year city award

- Logo
- Awarded for: Awarded to a city with innovative ideas, projects and activities that aim to raise up young voices and bring a new youth perspective to all aspects of city life.
- Presented by: European Youth Forum
- First award: 2009
- Website: Official website

The European Youth Capital (EYC) is a title awarded by the European Youth Forum to a European city annually, designed to empower young people, boost youth participation and strengthen European identity through projects focused on youth-related cultural, social, political and economic life and development. The European Youth Capital is an initiative by the European Youth Forum and is awarded for a period of one year. The first capital was chosen in 2009. Since 2014, the Congress of Local and Regional Authorities of the Council of Europe is an official partner the European Youth Capital title. The current capital for the 2026 calendar year is Tromsø, Norway. It is the northernmost city to ever hold the title, with a programme focused on climate resilience, youth participation in the Arctic, and the inclusion of indigenous Sámi culture.

== Goals ==
The European Youth Capital aims to promote intra-European co-operation between young people. Among the most important aspects of the institution is the betterment of everyday life of the youth in the city selected as youth capital, not just for the duration of the festivities, but in the long term. Additionally, participation of the youth in the design and implementation of the plans for each capital of youth is encouraged by the EYC. Ensuring that the youth are informed and actively involved in society and given opportunities for a better future is also a priority for the EYC initiative. Tourism and increased international prestige are some of the additional benefits of being named European Youth Capital.

== Capitals (2009–2026) ==
Since 2009, there have been the following European Youth Capitals:

European Youth Capital
Year	City	Country	Notes
2009	Rotterdam	Netherlands	
2010	Turin	Italy	
2011	Antwerp	Belgium	
2012	Braga	Portugal	Info
2013	Maribor	Slovenia	Info
2014	Thessaloniki	Greece	Info finalists: (Russia) Ivanovo, (Greece) Heraklion, other candidates: (Spain) Barcelona, (Turkey) Konya, (Russia) Perm, (Turkey) Trabzon
2015	Cluj-Napoca	Romania	Info finalists: (Russia) Ivanovo, (Lithuania) Vilnius, (Bulgaria) Varna other candidates: (Poland) Katowice, (Spain) La Laguna, (Spain) Badajoz, (Azerbaijan) Ganja, (Italy) Lecce and (Russia) Perm
2016	Ganja	Azerbaijan	other candidates: (Bulgaria) Varna, (Lithuania) Vilnius, (Spain) La Laguna and (Spain) Badajoz
2017	Varna	Bulgaria	other candidates: (Portugal) Cascais, (Republic of Ireland) Galway, (United Kingdom) Newcastle upon Tyne and (Italy) Perugia
2018	Cascais	Portugal	other candidates: (Hungary) Kecskemét, (United Kingdom) Manchester, (Serbia) Novi Sad and (Italy) Perugia
2019	Novi Sad	Serbia	other candidates: (France) Amiens, (United Kingdom) Derry/Strabane, (Republic of Ireland) Galway, (United Kingdom) Manchester and (Italy) Perugia
2020	Amiens	France	other candidates: (Moldova) Chișinău, (Lithuania) Klaipėda, (Romania) Timișoara and (Austria) Villach
2021	Klaipėda	Lithuania	other candidates: (Moldova) Chișinău, (Cyprus) Greater Nicosia, (Croatia) Varaždin and (Russia) Yaroslavl
2022	Tirana	Albania	other candidates: (Romania) Baia Mare, (Russia) Kazan, (Poland) Poznań and (Croatia) Varaždin
2023	Lublin	Poland	other candidates: (Romania) Baia Mare, (Russia) Kazan, (Turkey) İzmir, (Ukraine) Lviv and (Poland) Poznań
2024	Ghent	Belgium	other candidates: (Moldova) Chișinău, (Ukraine) Lviv and (Hungary) Veszprém
2025	Lviv	Ukraine	other candidates: (Spain) Fuenlabrada, (Turkey) İzmir and (Norway) Tromsø
2026	Tromsø	Norway	Other candidates: (Turkey) İzmir, (Spain) Málaga, (Bosnia and Herzegovina) Sarajevo and (Portugal) Vila do Conde
2027	Parma	Italy	other candidates: (Moldova) Chișinău, (Spain) Fuenlabrada, (Spain) Málaga, (North Macedonia) Skopje
2028	Podgorica	Montenegro	Other candidates: (Moldova) Chișinău, (Netherlands) Leeuwarden, (Cyprus) Paralimni and (Bulgaria) Pernik

Locations of European Youth Capitals. Green designates current cities; red is for past cities; and blue for future cities.

== See also ==
- European Capital of Culture
- European Region of Gastronomy
