= Pat Walsh (author) =

Author and publishing consultant

Pat Walsh (born 1968) is an author, independent publishing consultant/book packager, and former editor-in-chief at MacAdam/Cage.

Walsh began his career as a reporter for the San Francisco Chronicle. In 1998, Walsh joined David Poindexter as an editor at the newly-formed publishing house, MacAdam/Cage, where he worked for a decade. Walsh was instrumental in acquiring some of the house’s most successful titles, including Ella Minnow Pea by Mark Dunn, The Contortionist’s Handbook by Craig Clevenger, and The Time Traveler’s Wife by Audrey Niffenegger.

After MacAdam/Cage, Walsh was director of North American operations for MP Publishing, a United Kingdom–based publisher of fiction and memoir, and director of subsidiary and foreign rights for Dzanc Books where he oversaw the sales and contractual terms for translation, audio, television, and film rights before launching his own publishing consultancy firm.

After the closing of MacAdam/Cage in 2014 due to the death of David Poindexter and bankruptcy, Walsh worked with the Author’s Guild and played a critical role in clearing up the house’s financial obligations and rights reversion.

Walsh is the author of 78 Reasons Why Your Book May Never Be Published and 14 Reasons Why it Just Might (Penguin), a book outlining the challenges that face writers and authors today; and How to Win the World Series of Poker (Or Not) (Penguin), a memoir. Walsh also co-wrote with David Hitz How to Castrate a Bull: Unexpected Lessons on Risk, Growth, and Success in Business.

Walsh has also written for The New York Times. among other publications.
