= Welcome to Higby =

2002 novel by Mark Dunn

- First edition (US)
- Author: Mark Dunn
- Language: English
- Genre: Comedy
- Publisher: MacAdam/Cage (US); Methuen (UK)
- Publication date: 2002 (US), 2004 (UK)
- Publication place: United States
- Media type: Print & eBook
- Pages: 352 or 339
- ISBN: 1-931561-17-6

Welcome to Higby is the second novel by Mark Dunn published in 2002 by MacAdam/Cage. and dedicated to his twin brother Clay.

== Plot introduction ==
The novel concerns the interconnected lives of the inhabitants of Higby, a fictional town in northern Mississippi, during the Labor Day weekend in 1993. Five separate story lines are woven together featuring 25 main characters which include the Revd. Oren Cullen, struggling to cope with the death of his wife and behaviour of his son Clint (who starts the weekend by falling off a water tower) who is drawn to the manageress of the local massage parlour and Talitha Leigh, kidnapped by an extremist vegan cult and renamed 'Blithe'.

== Reception ==
- A review from The Independent says the novel is 'undemanding but often hilarious', 'a cross between John Irving and the Coen brothers'.
- Publishers Weekly describe it as a 'witty and intricate book', 'both laugh-out-loud funny and sweetly touching','Dunn, a playwright, has a wonderful ear for dialogue; his rich and enticing prose, elegant structuring and wonderful attention to the smallest of details make this novel a delight.'
- Leif Enger compared the book to Modern Baptists by James Wilcox and Texasville by Larry McMurtry
