= Portez ce vieux whisky au juge blond qui fume =

French-language panagram

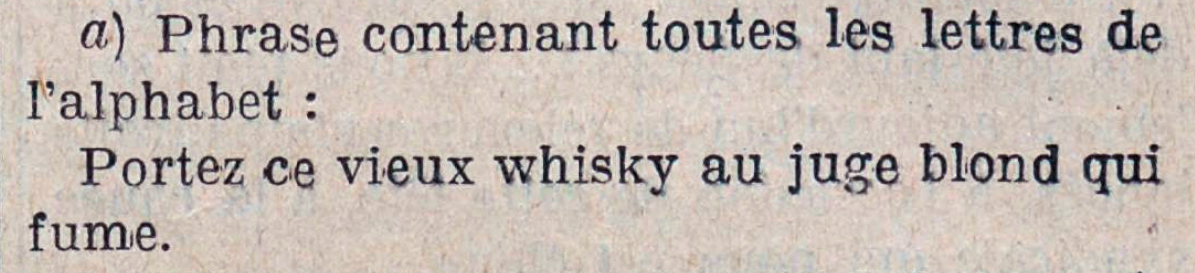
The pangram printed in Charles Triouleyre's "Causerie dactylographique", 1921

"Portez ce vieux whisky au juge blond qui fume" ("Take this old whisky to the blond judge who is smoking") is a French language pangram, that is, a sentence that uses every letter of the alphabet (not including accents nor ligatures) (Note: A famous English language pangram is “The quick brown fox jumps over the lazy dog”.). It is also an alexandrine.

The pangram contains 37 letters and does not repeat any consonants. Though not the oldest or shortest pangram, (Note: Le Soir notes the similar pangram Jugez vite faux whisky blond parmi cinq ("Quickly find fake blond whisky among these five") has four fewer letters.) it is the best known. It is often used by people learning to type, is familiar to many French speakers, and is a standard piece of text to test typography and printing equipment, sometimes used as a placeholder. Some firmware in printers produced for the French market has the pangram stored in its internal code. Sometimes an expanded version, "au juge blond qui fume la pipe", which covers all lower-case letters, is used.

The pangram became popular after being published in Albert Navarre's Manuel d’organisation du bureau in 1924. The first widespread commercial publication of the pangram has been attributed to the French-language comic series Journal de Mickey.

The author of the phrase has sometimes been claimed to be the novelist and essayist Georges Perec, but this is not believed to be correct. In the absence of certainty, a cross-checking of clues allowed the Canadian pangram expert Jean Fontaine to think that it was created between 1910 and 1924 and that the author could be the champion typist Charles Triouleyre. The writer Claude Gagnière has praised the pangram as a "superb sentence" and a "model of the genre".

An alternative used to test communication circuits (such as radioteletype) is "Voyez le brick géant que j'examine près du wharf" ("Look at the giant brig I'm examining next to the wharf").
