= Lipogram =

Writing that avoids specific letters

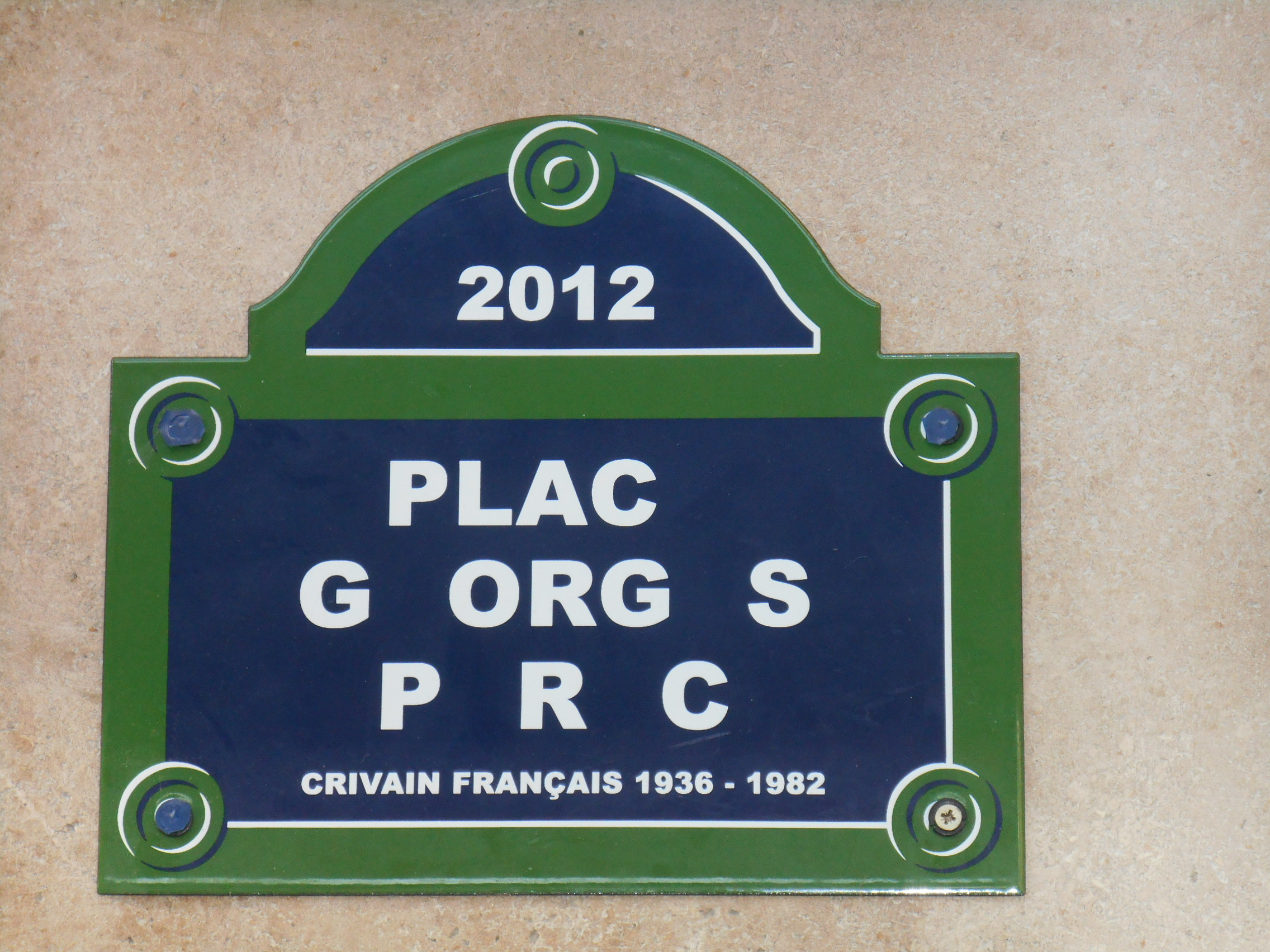
Plaque in tribute to Georges Perec by Christophe Verdon. Café de la Mairie, Place Saint-Sulpice in Paris

A lipogram (from Ancient Greek: λειπογράμματος, romanized: leipográmmatos, "leaving out a letter") is a kind of constrained writing or word game consisting of writing paragraphs or longer works in which a particular letter or group of letters is avoided. Extended Ancient Greek texts avoiding the letter sigma are the earliest examples of lipograms.

Writing a lipogram may be a trivial task when avoiding uncommon letters like Z, J, Q, or X, but it is much more challenging to avoid common letters like E, T, or A in the English language, as the author must omit many ordinary words. Grammatically meaningful and smooth-flowing lipograms can be difficult to compose. Identifying lipograms can also be problematic, as there is always the possibility that a given piece of writing in any language may be unintentionally lipogrammatic. For example, Poe's poem The Raven contains no Z, but there is no evidence that this was intentional.

A pangrammatic lipogram is a text that uses every letter of the alphabet except one. For example, "The quick brown fox jumped over the lazy dog" omits the letter S, which the usual pangram includes by using the word jumps.

== History ==
Lasus of Hermione, who lived during the second half of the sixth century BCE, is the most ancient author of a lipogram. This makes the lipogram, according to Quintus Curtius Rufus, "the most ancient systematic artifice of Western literature". Lasus did not like the letter sigma, and excluded it from one of his poems, entitled Ode to the Centaurs, of which nothing remains; as well as a Hymn to Demeter, of which the first verse remains:

Original

Δάματρα μέλπω Κόραν τε Κλυμένοι᾽ ἄλοχον
μελιβόαν ὕμνον ἀναγνέων
Αἰολίδ᾽ ἂμ βαρύβρομον ἁρμονίαν

Transliteration

Dámatra mélpô Kóran te Klyménoi᾽ álochon
melibóan hýmnon anagnéôn
Aiolíd᾽ ám barýbromon harmonían

English translation

I chant of Demeter and Kore, Wife of the famed [Hades]
Lifting forth a gentle-voiced hymn
In the deep-toned Aeolian mode.

The Greek poets from late antiquity Nestor of Laranda and Tryphiodorus wrote lipogrammatic adaptations of the Homeric poems: Nestor composed an Iliad, which was followed by Tryphiodorus' Odyssey. Both Nestor's Iliad and Tryphiodorus' Odyssey were composed of 24 books (like the original Iliad and Odyssey) each book omitting a subsequent letter of the Greek alphabet. Therefore, the first book omitted alpha, the second beta, the third gamma, and so forth.

Twelve centuries after Tryphiodorus wrote his lipogrammatic Odyssey, in 1711, the influential London essayist and journalist Joseph Addison commented on this work (although it had been lost), arguing that "it must have been amusing to see the most elegant word of the language rejected like "a diamond with a flaw in it" if it was tainted by the proscribed letter".

Petrus Riga, a canon of Sainte-Marie de Reims during the 11th century, translated the Bible, and due to its scriptural obscurities called it Aurora. Each canto of the translation was followed by a resume in Lipogrammatic verse; the first canto has no A, the second has no B, the third has no C, and so on. There are two hundred and fifty manuscripts of Petrus Riga's Bible still preserved.

There is a tradition of German and Italian lipograms excluding the letter R dating from the seventeenth century until modern times. While some authors excluded other letters, it was the exclusion of the R which ensured the practice of the lipogram continued into modern times. In German especially, the R, while not the most prevalent letter, has a very important grammatical role, as masculine pronouns, etc. in the nominative case include an R (e.g. er, der, dieser, jener, welcher). For the Italian authors, it seems to be a profound dislike of the letter R which prompted them to write lipograms excluding this letter (and often only this letter).

There is also a long tradition of vocalic lipograms, in which a vowel (or vowels) is omitted. This tends to be the most difficult form of the lipogram. This practice was developed mainly in Spain by the Portuguese author Alonso de Alcala y Herrera who published an octavo entitled Varios efectos de amor, en cinco novelas exemplares, y nuevo artificio para escribir prosa y versos sin una de las letras vocales. From Spain, the method moved into France and England.

One of the most remarkable examples of a lipogram is Ernest Vincent Wright's novel Gadsby (1939), which has over 50,000 words but not a single letter E. Wright's self-imposed rule prohibited such common English words as the and he, plurals ending in -es, past tenses ending in -ed, and even abbreviations like Mr. (since it is short for Mister) or Rob (for Robert). Yet the narration flows fairly smoothly, and the book was praised by critics for its literary merits.

Wright was motivated to write Gadsby by an earlier four-stanza lipogrammatic poem of another author.

Even earlier, Spanish playwright Enrique Jardiel Poncela published five short stories between 1926 and 1927, each one omitting a vowel; the best known are "El Chofer Nuevo" ("The new Driver"), without the letter A, and "Un marido sin vocación" ("A Vocationless Husband"), without the E.

Interest in lipograms was rekindled by Georges Perec's novel La Disparition (1969) (openly inspired by Wright's Gadsby) and its English translation A Void by Gilbert Adair. Both works are missing the letter E, which is the most common letter in French as well as in English. A Turkish translation is likewise missing the letter E, while the Spanish translation instead omits the letter A, the second most common letter in that language. Perec subsequently wrote Les Revenentes (1972), a novel that uses no vowels except for E. Perec was a member of Oulipo, a group of French authors who adopted a variety of constraints in their work. La Disparition is, to date, the longest lipogram in existence.

== Analysing lipograms ==
Lipograms are sometimes dismissed by academia. "Literary history seems deliberately to ignore writing as practice, as work, as play".

In his book Rethinking Writing, Roy Harris notes that without the ability to analyse language, the lipogram would be unable to exist. He argues that "the lipogram would be inconceivable unless there were writing systems based on fixed inventories of graphic units, and unless it were possible to classify written texts on the base of the presence or absence of one of those units irrespective of any phonetic value it might have or any function in the script". He argues that as the Greeks were able to invent this system of writing as they had a concept of literary notation. Harris then argues that the proof of this knowledge is found in the Greek invention of "a literate game which consists, essentially, in superimposing the structure of a notation on the structure of texts".

== Pangrammatic lipogram ==
A pangrammatic lipogram or lipogrammatic pangram uses every letter of the alphabet except one. An example omitting the letter E is:

A jovial swain should not complain
Of any buxom fair
Who mocks his pain and thinks it gain
To quiz his awkward air.

A longer example is "Fate of Nassan", an anonymous poem dating from pre-1870, where each stanza is a lipogrammatic pangram using every letter of the alphabet except E.

Bold Nassan quits his caravan,
A hazy mountain grot to scan;
Climbs jaggy rocks to spy his way,
Doth tax his sight, but far doth stray.

Not work of man, nor sport of child
Finds Nassan on this mazy wild;
Lax grow his joints, limbs toil in vain—
Poor wight! why didst thou quit that plain?

Vainly for succour Nassan calls;
Know, Zillah, that thy Nassan falls;
But prowling wolf and fox may joy
To quarry on thy Arab boy.

One other pangrammatic lipogram omitting only the letter E is:

Now focus your mind vigorously on this paragraph and on all its words. What’s so unusual about it? Don’t just zip through it quickly. Go through it slowly. Tax your brain as much as you can.

The KJV Bible unintentionally contains two lipogrammatic pangrams: Ezra 7:21 lacks only J, and 1 Chronicles 12:40 lacks only Q.

== Dropping letters ==
Another type of lipogram, which omits every instance of a letter from words that would otherwise contain it, as opposed to finding other words that do not contain the letter, was recorded by Willard R. Espy in 181 Missing O's, based on C. C. Bombaugh's univocalic 'Incontrovertible Facts'.

N mnk t gd t rb r cg r plt.
N fl s grss t blt Sctch cllps ht.
Frm Dnjn's tps n rnc rlls.
Lgwd, nt Lts, flds prt's bwls.
Bx tps, nt bttms, schl-bys flg fr sprt.
Trps f ld tsspts, ft, t st, cnsrt.
N cl mnsns blw sft n xfrd dns,
rthdx, dg-trt, bk-wrm Slmns.
Bld strgths f ghsts n hrrr shw.
n Lndn shp-frnts n hp-blssms grw.
T crcks f gld n dd lks fr fd.
n sft clth ftstls n ld fx dth brd.
Lng strm-tst slps frlrn, wrk n t prt.
Rks d nt rst n spns, nr wd-ccks snrt,
N dg n snw-drp r n cltsft rlls,
Nr cmmn frg cncct lng prtcls.

The above is also a conventional lipogram in omitting the letters A, E, I, O, and U.

American author James Thurber wrote The W[o]nderful [O] (1957), a fairy tale in which villains ban the letter 'O' from the use by the inhabitants of the island of [Oo]r[oo].

The book Ella Minnow Pea by Mark Dunn (2001) is described as a "progressively lipogrammatic epistolary fable": the plot of the story deals with a small country that begins to outlaw the use of various letters as the tiles of each letter fall off of a statue. As each letter is outlawed within the story, it is (for the most part) no longer used in the text of the novel. It is not purely lipogrammatic, however, because the outlawed letters do appear in the text proper from time to time (the characters being penalized with banishment for their use) and when the plot requires a search for pangram sentences, all twenty-six letters are obviously in use. Also, late in the text, the author begins using letters serving as homophones for the omitted letters (i.e., PH in place of an F, G in place of C), which may be considered cheating. At the beginning of each chapter, the alphabet appears along with a sentence, "The quick brown fox jumps over the lazy dog". As the letters are removed from the story, the alphabet, and sentence changes.

Chapter 1: ABCDEFGHIJKLMNOPQRSTUVWXYZ "The quick brown fox jumps over the lazy dog".
Chapter 2: ABCDEFGHIJKLMNOPQRSTUVWXY* "The quick brown fox jumps over the la*y dog".
Chapter 3: ABCDEFGHIJKLMNOP*RSTUVWXY* "The *uick brown fox jumps over the la*y dog".
Chapter 4: ABCDEFGHI*KLMNOP*RSTUVWXY* "The *uick brown fox *umps over the la*y dog".
Chapter 5: ABCDEFGHI*KLMNOP*RSTUVW*Y* "The *uick brown fo* *umps over the la*y dog".

== Other examples ==
In Rebeccah Giltrow's Twenty-Six Degrees, each of the twenty-six chapters, narrated by a different character, deliberately excludes one of the twenty-six letters while using the other twenty-five at least once. Each of the twenty-six letters is excluded from one and only one chapter (the first chapter excludes A, the second chapter excludes B, the third chapter excludes C, etc., the last (twenty-sixth) chapter excludes Z).

Cipher and Poverty (The Book of Nothing), a book by Mike Schertzer (1998), is presented as the writings of "a prisoner whose world had been impoverished to a single utterance ... who can find me here in this silence". The poems that follow use only the vowels A, E, I, and O, and consonants C, D, F, H, L, M, N, R, S, T, and W, taken from that utterance.

Another example is the book Eunoia written by Canadian author Christian Bök (2001). The title uses every vowel once and each of the five chapters is its own lipogram. The first chapter only uses words that have the vowel "A" and no other vowels, the second exclusively uses words that only have the vowel "E", the third only uses words with just the vowel "I", and so on.

In December 2009, a collective of crime writers, Criminal Brief, published eight days of articles as a Christmas-themed lipogrammatic exercise.

In June 2013, finance author Alan Corey published "The Subversive Job Search", a non-fiction lipogram that omitted the letter "Z".

In the ninth episode of the ninth season of How I Met Your Mother, "Platonish", Lily and Robin challenge Barney to obtain a girl's phone number without using the letter E.

A website called the Found Poetry Review asked each of its readers (as part of a larger series of challenges) to compose a poem avoiding all letters in the title of the newspaper that had already been selected. For example, if the reader was using the New York Times, then they could not use the letters E, I, K, M, N, O, R, S, T, W, and Y.

Grant Maierhofer's Ebb, a novel published in 2023, by Kernpunkt Press, was written entirely without the letter "A".

== Non-English examples ==
In Turkey the tradition of "Lebdeğmez atışma" or "Dudak değmez aşık atışması" (literally: two troubadours throwing verses at each other where lips do not touch each other) that is still practiced, a form of instantaneously improvised poetry sung by opposing Ashiks taking turns for artfully criticising each other with one verse at a time, usually by each placing a pin between their upper and lower lips so that the improvised song, accompanied by a Saz (played by the ashik himself), consists only of labial lipograms i.e. without words where lips must touch each other, effectively excluding the letters B, F, M, P and V from the text of the improvised songs.

The seventh- or eighth-century Dashakumaracharita by Daṇḍin includes a prominent lipogrammatic section at the beginning of the seventh chapter. Mantragupta is called upon to relate his adventures. However, during the previous night of vigorous lovemaking, his lips have been nibbled several times by his beloved; as a result, they are now swollen, making it painful for him to close them. Thus, throughout his narrative, he is compelled to refrain from using any labial consonants (प,फ,ब,भ,म).

In France, J. R. Ronden premièred la Pièce sans A (The Play without A) in 1816. Jacques Arago wrote in 1853 a version of his Voyage autour du monde (Voyage around the world), but without the letter a. Georges Perec published in 1969 La Disparition, a novel without the letter e, the most commonly used letter of the alphabet in French. Its published translation into English, A Void, by Gilbert Adair, won the Scott Moncrieff Prize in 1995.

In Sweden, a form of lipogram was developed out of necessity at the Linköping University. Because files were shared and moved between computer platforms where the internal representation of the characters Å, Ä, Ö, å, ä, and ö (all moderately common vowels) were different, the tradition to write comments in source code without using those characters emerged.

Zanzō ni Kuchibeni o (1989) by Yasutaka Tsutsui is a progressively lipogrammatic novel in Japanese. The first chapter is written without the syllable あ (a), the second without あ and い (i), the third without あ, い, and う (u), and so on; usable syllables decrease as the story advances. In the last chapter, the last syllable, ん (n), vanishes and the story is closed.

Zero Degree (1991) by Charu Nivedita is a lipogrammatic novel in Tamil. The entire novel is written without the common word ஒரு (oru, "one", also used as the indefinite article), and there are no punctuation marks in the novel except dots. Later the novel was translated into English.

Russian 18th-century poet Gavriil Derzhavin avoided the harsh R sound (and the letter Р that represents it) in his poem "The Nightingale" to render the bird's singing.

The seventh-century Arab theologian Wasil ibn Ata gave a sermon without the letter rāʾ (R). However, it was the 19th-century Mufti of Damascus, Mahmud Hamza "al-Hamzawi" (d. 1887), who produced perhaps the most remarkable work of this genre with a complete commentary of the Quran (published in two volumes) without dotted letters in either the introduction or interlinear commentary. This is all the more remarkable because dotted letters make up about half of the Arabic alphabet.

In Hungarian language, the game "eszperente" is a game where people only speak using words that contain the vowel "e"; as this makes otherwise straightforward communication complicated, a lot of creative thinking is required in describing common terms in roundabout ways.

In Spanish, Mexican author Óscar de la Borbolla, published in 1991 Las vocales malditas (the cursed vowels), a compilation of five short stories composed using a single different vowel: "Cantata a Satanás" (Cantata to Satan), "El hereje rebelde" (the rebel heretic), "Mimí sin bikini" (Mimi without a bikini), "Los locos somos otro cosmos" (we the fools are another cosmos), and "Un gurú vudú" (a voodoo guru).

== Non-literary lipograms ==
While a lipogram is usually limited to literary works, there are also chromatic lipograms, works of music that avoid the use of certain notes. Examples avoiding either the second, sixth, and tenth notes, or the third, seventh, and eleventh notes in a chromatic scale have been cited.

== Reverse lipogram ==
A reverse lipogram, also known as an antilipo or transgram is a type of constrained writing where each word must contain a particular letter in the text. For example, this is a short antilipo where each word contains the letter "O":

Once someone’s gone, nobody loses; also, victory’s not for people who don’t know about world history.

== See also ==
- Pangram (The quick brown fox jumps over the lazy dog)
- Palindrome
- Letter frequency
