= Dermaphoria =

2005 novel by Craig Clevenger

- First edition cover
- Author: Craig Clevenger
- Cover artist: Jacket design by Dorothy Carico Smith
- Language: English
- Genre: Novel
- Publisher: MacAdam/Cage
- Publication date: October 9, 2005
- Publication place: United States
- Media type: Print (Hardcover, Paperback)
- Pages: 214 pp (first edition, hardback)
- ISBN: 1-931561-75-3
- OCLC: 60972005
- Dewey Decimal: 813/.6 22
- LC Class: PS3603.L49 D47 2005
- Preceded by: The Contortionist's Handbook

Dermaphoria (2005) is a novel written by American author Craig Clevenger.

== Plot summary ==
Eric Ashworth awakens in jail, unable to remember how he got there or why. All he does remember is a woman's name: Desiree.

Bailed out and holed up in a low rent motel, Eric finds the solution to his amnesia in a strange new hallucinogen. By synthesizing the sense of touch, the drug produces a disjointed series of sensations that slowly allow Eric to remember his former life as a clandestine chemist. With steadily increasing doses, Eric reassembles his past at the expense of his grip on the present, and his distinction between truth and fantasy crumbles as his paranoia grows in tandem with his tolerance.

== Characters ==
- Eric Ashworth
- Desiree
- Manhattan White
- Toe Tag
- Hoyle
- Otto
- Detective Anslinger
- Jack and the Beanstalk

== Reviews ==
- Woozy memories of a drugmaker - June Sawyers - San Francisco Chronicle
- You are what you read - Ben Popper - Memphis Flyer Online
- Dermaphoria - Luan Gaines - Curled Up
- Dermaphoria - Thomas Scott McKenzie - PopMatters

== Film Adaptation ==
The book was adapted into a film, which premiered on June 13, 2014 at the East End Film Festival. It was directed by Ross Clarke and starred Joseph Morgan, Ron Perlman, Kate Walsh, and Walton Goggins.

== U.S. editions ==
- MacAdam/Cage Publishing, October 2005. Paperback Edition. ISBN 1-931561-75-3
- MacAdam/Cage Publishing, September 2006. Paperback Edition. ISBN 1-59692-102-1

== See also ==
- Neo-noir
