= AP English Language and Composition =

Advanced Placement course and exam

Logo of Advanced Placement English Language and Composition as of 2025

Advanced Placement (AP) English Language and Composition (also known as AP English Language, APENG, AP Lang, ELAP, AP English III, or APEL), is an American course and examination offered by the College Board as part of the Advanced Placement Program.

== Course ==
AP English Language and Composition is a course in the study of rhetoric taken in high school. Many schools offer this course primarily to juniors and the AP English Literature and Composition course to seniors. Other schools reverse the order, and some offer both courses to both juniors and seniors. The College Board advises that students choosing AP English Language and Composition be interested in studying and writing various kinds of analytic or persuasive essays on non-fiction topics, while students choosing AP English Literature and Composition be interested in studying literature of various periods and mediums (fiction, poetry, drama) and using this wide reading knowledge in discussions of literary topics.

== Exam ==
=== Format ===
The AP English Language and Composition exam is typically administered on a Tuesday or Wednesday morning in the second week of May. The exam consists of two sections: a one-hour multiple-choice (MCQ) section, and a two-hour fifteen-minute free-response (FRQ) section. The exam is further divided as follows:

	# of Questions	Percentage of score	Time Allowed
Section I: Multiple-Choice	45	45	60 Minutes
Section II: Free-Response	3	55	15 minutes (reading portion); 120 minutes (writing portion)

==== Section I: Multiple Choice ====
The multiple-choice (MCQ) section of the test features 45 questions, divided between 23–25 reading questions and 20–22 writing questions. There are typically 4 short passages divided between pre-20th century non-fiction prose, and 20th and 21st century non-fiction prose. The questions assess students ability to understand rhetorical situations, claims and evidence, reasoning and organization, and style. Students have 60 minutes to answer all 45 questions, and the section accounts for 45% of the students' scores.

==== Section II: Free-Response Writing ====
The free-response (FRQ) section of the test consists of three prompts, each of a different type: synthesis, rhetorical analysis, and argument. Each is scored on a scale from 0 to 6, including a potential maximum 1 point for a thesis statement, 4 points for evidence and commentary, and 1 point for "sophistication".

With the introduction of the synthesis essay in 2007, the College Board allotted 15 additional minutes to the free-response exam portion to allow students to read and annotate the three prompts, as well as the passages and sources provided. During the reading time, students may read the prompts and examine the documents. They may use this time to make notes, or begin writing their essay.

The synthesis prompt typically requires students to consider a scenario, then formulate a response to a specific element of the scenario using at least three of the accompanying sources for support. While a total of six or seven sources accompany the prompt, using information from all of the sources is not necessary, and may even be undesirable. The source material used must be cited in the essay in order to be considered legitimate.

The rhetorical analysis prompt typically asks students to read a short (less than 1 page) passage, which may have been written at any time, as long as it was originally written in modern English. After reading the passage, students are asked to write an essay in which they analyze and discuss various techniques the author uses in the passage. The techniques differ from prompt to prompt, but may ask about strategies, argumentative techniques, motivations, or other rhetorical elements of the passage, and how such techniques effectively contribute to the overall purpose of the passage. The prompt may mention specific techniques or purposes, but some leeway of discussion is left to the student.

The argument prompt typically gives a position in the form of an assertion from a documented source. Students are asked to consider the assertion, and then form an argument that defends, challenges, or qualifies the assertion using supporting evidence from their own knowledge or reading.

== Scoring ==
The multiple-choice section is scored by computer. Formerly, the test was scored by awarding 1 point for correct answers, while taking off a 1/4 point for incorrect answers. No points were taken away for blank answers. However, the College Board discontinued the policy for all AP Exams in 2011; now, they only award 1 point for each correct answer, with no 1/4 point deductions.

The free-response section is scored individually by hundreds of educators each June. Each essay is assigned a score from 0–6, 6 being high. The student's thesis may earn one point, their argument and evidence may earn up to four points, and an extra point may be earned for holistic complexity and sophistication of the argument or of the essay as a whole.

The FRQ scoring was changed in 2019 from a 9 point holistic scale.

The scores from the three essays are added and integrated with the adjusted multiple-choice score (using appropriate weights of each section) to generate a composite score. The composite is then converted into an AP score of 1–5 using a scale for that year's exam.

Students generally receive their scores by mail in mid-July of the year they took the test. Scores can be viewed on the College Board website using My AP. Alternatively, they can receive their scores by phone as early as July 1 for a fee. Sub-scores are not available for students for the English Language and Composition Exam.

Instructors of all AP courses each receive a score sheet showing the individual score for each of their students, as well as some score information and national averages.

=== Grade distributions ===
The grade distributions since 2008 are shown below:

Year	Score percentages					% of Scores 3 or Higher	Mean	Standard Deviation	Number of Students
Year	5	4	3	2	1	% of Scores 3 or Higher	Mean	Standard Deviation	Number of Students
2008	8.7%	18.2%	31.4%	30.5%	11.3%	58.2%	2.82	1.12	306,479
2009	10.5%	19.0%	30.2%	28.4%	11.9%	59.7%	2.88	1.16	337,441
2010	10.7%	20.8%	29.3%	27.6%	11.6%	60.8%	2.91	1.17	374,620
2011	11.1%	20.0%	30.1%	27.5%	11.3%	61.2%	2.92	1.17	412,466
2012	11.0%	20.2%	28.9%	27.9%	11.9%	60.2%	2.90	1.18	443,835
2013	10.2%	16.2%	28.6%	29.8%	15.2%	55.0%	2.77	1.19	476,277
2014	9.6%	17.9%	28.4%	30.1%	14.1%	55.8%	2.79	1.17	505,244
2015	9.9%	18.3%	27.3%	29.7%	14.8%	55.5%	2.79	1.19	527,274
2016	10.7%	17.6%	27.1%	32.1%	12.6%	55.4%	2.82	1.18	547,575
2017	9.1%	18.3%	27.7%	30.7%	14.2%	55.0%	2.77	1.17	579,426
2018	10.6%	17.7%	28.8%	29.3%	13.5%	57.2%	2.83	1.19	580,043
2019	9.9%	18.2%	26.2%	31.2%	14.5%	54.3%	2.78	1.19	573,171
2020	12.6%	20.4%	29.1%	26.2%	11.8%	62.1%	2.96	1.20	535,478
2021	9.1%	22.9%	25.8%	29.3%	12.9%	57.7%	2.86	1.18	518,548
2022	10.4%	21.1%	24.2%	29.8%	14.5%	55.7%	2.83	1.21	520,771
2023	10.3%	19.7%	26.1%	29.5%	14.4%	56.1%	2.82	1.20	562,328
2024	9.8%	21.4%	23.5%	28.8%	16.6%	54.6%	2.79	1.23	597,097
2025	13.4%	28.0%	32.8%	16.1%	9.7%	74.3%	3.19	1.15	616,294
2026	15%	28%	32%	15%	10%	75%			631,000

After 2010, the AP English Language and Composition test overtook the AP United States History test as the most taken in the AP program.

=== Composite score range ===
The College Board has released information on the composite score range (out of 150) required to obtain each grade: This score table is not absolute, and the ranges vary with each administration of the test. With the addition of the synthesis essay in 2007, the scoring tables were revised to account for the new essay type in Section II of the test.

Final Score	Range (2001)	Range (2002)
5	108–150	113–150
4	93–107	96–112
3	72–92	76–95
2	43–71	48–75
1	0–42	0–47

=== Recent changes ===
In 2007, there was a change in the multiple choice portion of the exam. Questions began to be included about documentation and citation. These questions are based on at least one passage which is a published work, including footnotes or a bibliography.

In 2024, College Board announced the Multiple Choice Question portion of the exam would have four answer choices, rather than the previous five. This change was reflected in the 2025 AP English Language and Composition exam.
