= Ametsuchi no Uta =

Japanese pangram

The Ametsuchi no Uta (天地の歌) or Ametsuchi no Kotoba (天地の詞) is a Japanese pangram, first appearing in the 9th century AD in the Minamoto Shitagōshū (Collection of Minamoto Shitagō), which is credited as being the oldest perfect pangram in the Japanese language. Its name roughly translates to "Song (or Words) of the Universe".

== The text ==
The text of the pangram written in hiragana (including the now archaic ゐ wi and ゑ we as well as the also archaic 𛀁 ye. ん n is not included as it had not been invented yet)

あめ つち ほし そら
やま かは みね たに
くも きり むろ こけ
ひと いぬ うへ すゑ
ゆわ さる おふせよ
えの 𛀁を なれゐて

The text of the pangram written in kanji:

天 地 星 空
山 川 峰 谷
雲 霧 室 苔
人 犬 上 末
硫黄 猿 生ふせよ
榎の枝を 慣れ居て

The text of the pangram written in Hepburn romaji:

Ame tsuchi hoshi sora
Yama kaha mine tani
Kumo kiri muro koke
Hito inu uhe suwe
Yuwa saru ofuseyo
Eno yewo narewite

A rough and necessarily nonsensical English translation:

Heaven, earth, star, sky,
Mountain, river, ridge, valley,
Cloud, fog, mudhouse, moss,
Person, dog, top, end,
Sulfur, monkey, grow!
Hackberry branch! Keep getting more familiar!

== See also ==
- Iroha
- Japanese literature
