= Ibid (disambiguation) =

Ibid or Ibid. is a Latin abbreviation used in scholarly writing, meaning "the same place". It can also refer to:

- "Ibid" (short story), a 1927/28 short story by H. P. Lovecraft
- Ibid: A Life, a 2004 novel by Mark Dunn
- Ion beam-induced deposition, a process of decomposing gaseous molecules by focused ion beam
