= Ella Minnow Pea =

2001 novel by Mark Dunn

- First edition cover
- Author: Mark Dunn
- Language: English
- Genre: Epistolary
- Publisher: MacAdam/Cage (US) / Methuen (UK)
- Publication date: October 2001
- Publication place: United States
- English publication date: 2001 (US); 2002 (UK)
- Media type: Print (hardback & paperback)
- Pages: 208 pp (first edition, hardback)
- ISBN: 0-385-72243-5 (first edition, hardback)
- OCLC: 49531039

Ella Minnow Pea is a 2001 novel by Mark Dunn. The full title of the hardcover version is Ella Minnow Pea: a progressively lipogrammatic epistolary fable, while the paperback version is titled Ella Minnow Pea: A Novel in Letters or Ella Minnow Pea: A Novel without Letters.

== Plot summary ==
The plot is conveyed through mail or notes sent between various characters. The book is "progressively lipogrammatic"—as the story proceeds, more and more letters of the alphabet are excluded from the characters' writing. As letters disappear, the novel becomes more and more phonetically or creatively spelled, and requires more effort to interpret.

The novel is set on the fictitious island of Nollop, off the coast of South Carolina, which is home to Nevin Nollop, the supposed creator of the well-known pangram, "The quick brown fox jumps over the lazy dog." This sentence is preserved on a memorial statue to its creator on the island and is taken very seriously by the government of the island. Throughout the book, tiles containing the letters fall from the inscription beneath the statue, and as each one does, the island's government bans the contained letter's use from written or spoken communication. A penalty system is enforced for using the forbidden characters, with public censure for a first offence, lashing or stocks (violator's choice) upon a second offence and banishment from the island nation upon the third. By the end of the novel, most of the island's inhabitants have either been banished or have left of their own accord.

The island's high council becomes more and more nonsensical as time progresses and the alphabet diminishes, promoting Nollop to a divine status. Uncompromising in their enforcement of Nollop's "divine will", they offer only one hope to the frustrated islanders: to disprove Nollop's omniscience by finding a pangram of 32 letters (in contrast to Nollop's 35). With this goal in mind "Enterprise 32" is started, a project involving many of the novel's main characters. With but five characters left (L, M, N, O, and P), the elusive phrase is eventually discovered by Ella in one of her father's earlier letters: "Pack my box with five dozen liquor jugs," which has only 32 letters. The council accepts this and restores the right to all 26 letters to the populace.

== Characters ==
=== Ella Minnow Pea ===
Ella Minnow Pea is the 18-year-old protagonist of the novel. Her name is a play on words as it sounds like the pronunciation of the letters "LMNOP", fitting with the content of the novel. She is a strong and intelligent young woman who uses her determination and persistence to survive the hardship placed on the island of Nollop by the high council. Towards the end of the novel, she is the only one in her family left on the island and is in charge of Enterprise 32. She eventually runs across a sentence in her father's farewell letter that will save the citizens of Nollop from the oppression they are experiencing, and allow her family to return to the island.

=== Gwenette Minnow Pea ===
Gwenette is Ella's mother and Mittie Purcy's sister. She is a very strong woman who instills the qualities of determination and hope in her daughter. Eventually, she, along with the others in her family, becomes banished to the States after her third offence.

=== Amos Minnow Pea ===
Amos is Ella's father. He makes liquor jugs and other ceramic vessels for a living, and he is a recovering alcoholic. The insanity of the forbidden letter laws become too much later in the story, and he returns to his old ways of excessive drinking. He also commits a third offence and is banished. His farewell letter to Ella and his wife contains the sentence that eventually frees Nollop from the rules and regulations concerning the use of restricted letters.

=== Mittie Purcy ===
Mittie is Ella's aunt. She is a teacher at the local elementary school. Because of her career, she finds the laws passed by the council quite difficult to follow and obey. This, in turn, creates serious problems for her. She commits her first offence while explaining to her students that 12 eggs are equal to a dozen. The laws and restrictions put on the use of language on the island create a sense of depression in her life. She, along with her daughter and Nate Warren, travels to the States to escape her daughter's death sentence.

=== Tassie Purcy ===
Tassie is Ella's cousin and best friend, being only a few months older. She falls in love with Nate Warren, the writer and scholar, and gets into serious trouble with the council for sending them death threats because of their new legislation. Her threats, though admirable, create much trouble for her. Nate eventually returns to the island after his banishment to rescue her from her punishment due to her rebellion of the council's laws. Her temperament is rather hot-headed, and she is quick to see the negatives of a situation.

=== Nathaniel Warren ===
Nathaniel Warren is a researcher who lives in Georgia and travels to Nollop when he hears about the government rulings against taboo letters. He is willing to pose as "an old family friend" of the Purcys and use his knowledge and resources to help the people of Nollop find a logical solution to the "forbidden letter fiasco." He brings to Mr. Lyttle, a council member, that the tiles falling is a result of the adhesive breaking down of the fixative holding them in place. Unfortunately, this report doesn't affect the decisions of the council, although it brings about the sentence challenge. He is later discovered to be the scholarly writer he really is and is sent back to the States. He falls in love with Tassie Purcy.

=== Rederick Lyttle ===
Mr. Lyttle is the high priest on the council, and he seems to be the most sensible of those on the council. Although he doesn't accept the scientific solution to the tiles falling presented by Nate Warren, he is the man who proposes the idea of the Nollopians creating a 32-letter sentence containing all the letters in the alphabet to free themselves from the regulations pertaining to the forbidden letters. Not only does he propose a challenge to find the sentence, but he himself also participates and searches for the sentence that will free the citizens of Nollop.

=== Nevin Nollop ===
He is the idolized creator of the phrase "The quick brown fox jumps over the lazy dog." The island country is named after him. A cenotaph in the center of town is dedicated to Nollop and the immortal pangram he is said to have penned. When lettered tiles begin to fall from the memorial the High Island Council believes it is Nollop from beyond the grave demanding each fallen letter be stricken from society.

=== Dr. Mannheim ===
Dr. Mannheim is a professor at the local university. He plays a vital role in the attempt to find a pangram that fits the qualifications set by the council (also known as Enterprise 32). He and Tom, his assistant, lead the way in finding a sentence. He manages to create a sentence that is 37 letters in length, but his quest for a 32-letter sentence is ended abruptly when he refuses banishment and is shot and killed by island officials.

=== Georgeanne Towgate ===
Georgeanne Towgate is a citizen of Nollop who, at first, believes strongly in following the laws set up by the council. Her view of the issue quickly changes when her family is directly affected by the law, when her son, Timmy is shipped away. Her loneliness is obvious, and she begins to slowly lose her mind as the story progresses. Towards the end of the novel, she decides to paint her entire body for fun. This act leads to lead poisoning from the paint, and she dies from the poisoning.

== Major themes ==
=== Totalitarianism ===
One of the main themes of the story is totalitarianism, in that the government attempts to control every aspect of written communication among the citizens, even sexual relations. Once the laws begin to be passed, the people of Nollop are scared even to attempt to rebel against the council for fear of the harsh penalties. This theme is brought to the forefront in the first letter of the novel. Ella writes to Tassie saying that "in the end, our assessments and opinions counted for (and continue to count for) precious little, and we have kept our public speculation to a minimum for fear of government reprisal". Ella Minnow Pea focuses on this theme when considering, "We slowly conclude that without language, without culture— the two are inextricably bound— existence is at stake".

=== Freedom of speech ===
The novel also addresses the importance of freedom of speech. Not only are the citizens of Nollop not allowed to use certain letters, but they are not allowed to speak out about how unjust the new laws are. If they interpret this particular situation any other way besides that of the council, they will be punished. In the council's letter to the citizens, the council writes that no alternate interpretations can be made because they are considered heresy, and heresy will be punished.

=== Good citizenship vs. freedom ===
The citizens of Nollop are torn between being good citizens by following the unjust laws or rebelling against the government by fighting for their precious freedoms. They realize that if they speak out for their freedom of speech, they will be punished. Many decide that living on the island under this tyranny is not worth it, so they rebel in order to be banished. Others rebel to stir up the emotions of the other citizens. There are many that just follow the orders of the council, but, once affected by them, decide that a change must be made. The citizens have two distinct choices: submit to the rules and live a life of misery or stand up for what is rightfully theirs and live a life of freedom.

== Awards and nominations ==
Ella Minnow Pea was selected as Borders' Book of the Year.

Ella Minnow Pea was a "Barnes & Noble Discover Great New Writers and a Borders Original Voices pick (and a finalist for Original Voices Book of the Year), but it ranked second on the Top Ten BookSense 76 Picklist."

Larson Award-winning writers Scott Burkell (script/lyrics) and Paul Loesel (composer) selected it out of many books to be produced as a musical. Its first full production was in November 2008 at the Arthur Miller Theatre on the University of Michigan campus, performed by auditioned students in the musical theater program. Anne Markt and Derek Carley starred. The full story can be read at Playbill.

== Translations ==
Despite the highly linguistic nature of this book it has been translated several times.

Ella Minnow Pea has been translated into French as L'Isle Lettrée by Marie-Claude Plourde, into Italian as Lettere: Fiaba epistolare in lipogrammi progressivi by Daniele Petruccioli, into German as Nollops Vermächtnis by Henning Ahrens, and into Spanish as Ella Minnow Pea by José Antonio Poderoso Miranda.
