= The quick brown fox jumps over the lazy dog =

Sentence containing all letters of the English alphabet

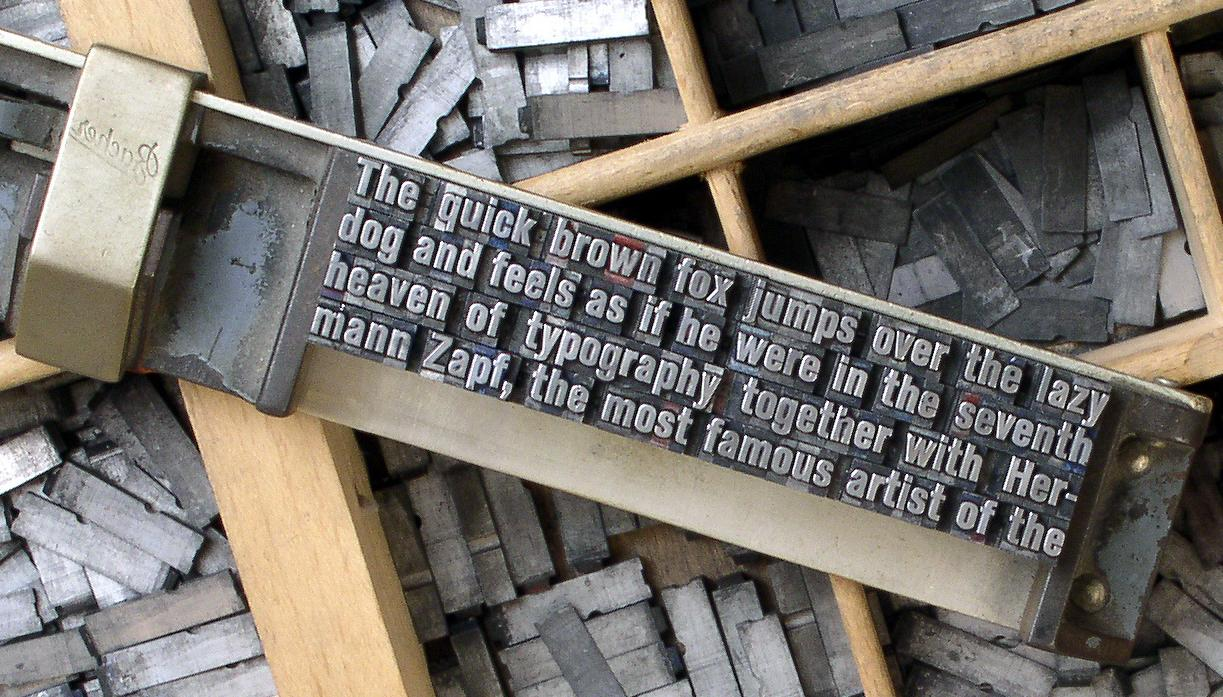
The phrase shown in metal moveable type, used in printing presses (image reversed for readability)

"The quick brown fox jumps over the lazy dog" is an English-language pangram; it contains all 26 letters of the English alphabet. Because of this, the phrase is commonly used for touch-typing practice, testing typewriters and computer keyboards, displaying examples of fonts, and other applications involving text where the use of all letters in the alphabet is desired.

== History ==
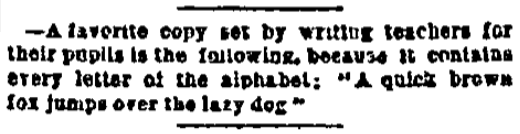
Item from the February 9, 1885, edition of The Boston Journal mentioning the phrase "A quick brown fox jumps over the lazy dog."

The earliest known appearance of the phrase was in The Boston Journal. In an article titled "Current Notes" in the February 9, 1885, edition, the phrase is mentioned as a good practice sentence for writing students: "A favorite copy set by writing teachers for their pupils is the following, because it contains every letter of the alphabet: 'A quick brown fox jumps over the lazy dog.'" Dozens of other newspapers published the phrase over the next few months, all using the version of the sentence starting with "A" rather than "The", which still contains all 26 letters as "the" is used later in the sentence. The earliest known use of the phrase starting with "The" is from the 1888 book Illustrative Shorthand by Linda Bronson. The modern form (starting with "The") became more common even though it is two letters longer than the original (starting with "A").

A 1908 edition of the Los Angeles Herald Sunday Magazine records that when the New York Herald was equipping an office with typewriters "a few years ago", staff found that the common practice sentence of "now is the time for all good men to come to the aid of the party" did not familiarize typists with the entire alphabet, and ran onto two lines in a newspaper column. They write that a staff member named Arthur F. Curtis invented the "quick brown fox" pangram to address this.

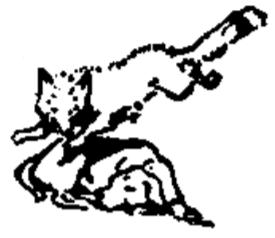
Pictorial depiction of the pangram from Scouting for Boys (1908)

As the use of typewriters grew in the late 19th century, the phrase began appearing in typing lesson books as a practice sentence. Early examples include How to Become Expert in Typewriting: A Complete Instructor Designed Especially for the Remington Typewriter (1890), and Typewriting Instructor and Stenographer's Hand-book (1892). By the turn of the 20th century, the phrase had become widely known. In the January 10, 1903, issue of Pitman's Phonetic Journal, it is referred to as "the well known memorized typing line embracing all the letters of the alphabet". Robert Baden-Powell's book Scouting for Boys (1908) uses the phrase as a practice sentence for signaling.

The first message sent on the Moscow–Washington hotline on August 30, 1963, was the test phrase "THE QUICK BROWN FOX JUMPED OVER THE LAZY DOG'S BACK 1234567890". Later, Soviet diplomat Andrei Gromyko asked American Secretary of State Dean Rusk what the phrase meant.

During the 20th century, technicians tested typewriters and teleprinters by typing the sentence.

It is the sentence used in the annual Zaner-Bloser National Handwriting Competition, a cursive writing competition which has been held in the U.S. since 1991.

== Computer usage ==
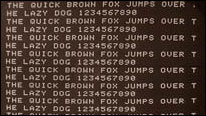
The phrase being used in a BBC Ceefax test from 1972

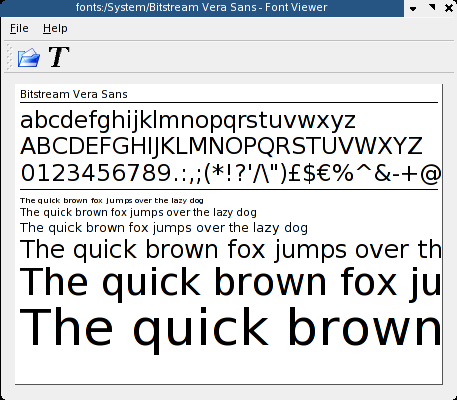
The phrase used to preview a computer typeface

In the age of computers, this pangram is commonly used to display font samples and for testing computer keyboards. In cryptography, it is commonly used as a test vector for hash and encryption algorithms to verify their implementation, as well as to ensure alphabetic character set compatibility.

Microsoft Word has a command to auto-type the sentence, in versions up to Word 2003, using the command =rand(), and in Microsoft Office Word 2007 and later using the command =rand.old().

== Cultural references ==
Numerous references to the phrase have occurred in movies, television, books, video games, advertising, websites, and graphic arts.

The lipogrammatic novel Ella Minnow Pea by Mark Dunn is built entirely around the "quick brown fox" pangram and its inventor. It depicts a fictional island off the South Carolina coast that idealizes the pangram, chronicling the effects on literature and social structure as various letters are banned from daily use by government dictum.

The NASA Space Shuttle flew a teleprinter that used the phrase "THE LAZY YELLOW DOG WAS CAUGHT BY THE SLOW RED FOX AS HE LAY SLEEPING IN THE SUN", a reference to the eponymous phrase, as part of its self-test program. While the phrase is not a pangram, as it lacks J, K, M, Q, and V, it was selected to be exactly 80 characters wide to match the length of the teleprinter's drum.

== Other pangrams ==
With 35 letters, this is not the shortest pangram. Shorter examples include:

- "Quick nymph bugs vex fjord waltz." (27 letters; U repeated)
- "Waltz, bad nymph, for quick jigs vex." (28 letters)
- "Sphinx of black quartz, judge my vow." (29 letters)
- "How vexingly quick daft zebras jump!" (30 letters)
- "The five boxing wizards jump quickly." (31 letters)
- "Pack my box with five dozen liquor jugs." (32 letters)

If abbreviations and non-dictionary words are allowed, it is possible to create a perfect pangram that uses each letter only once, such as "Mr. Jock, TV quiz PhD, bags few lynx".

== See also ==
- Filler text
  - Etaoin shrdlu – Common metal-type printing error
  - Lorem ipsum – Placeholder text used in publishing and graphic design
- Thousand Character Classic – Chinese educational poem
- Iroha – Japanese pangram poem
