= Mike Schertzer =

Canadian poet and artist

Mike Schertzer (born May 27, 1965, in Brantford, Ontario) is a Canadian poet and artist.

Schertzer graduated in 1987 from the University of British Columbia with a B.Sc. in biology, and lived for some time in Vancouver, British Columbia. In 2017 he obtained a PhD from the Université Pierre-et-Marie-Curie/Sorbonne Universités (ED515, Complexité du Vivant). He currently lives and works in Paris, France.

According to his personal homepage, he has worked as a research technician since 1987, and as of 2009, he has been employed as a molecular biologist at the Curie Institute in Paris, France. Of his artistic work, he says

"I practice a unique form of collage, which I call 'Sublimage' (paper and acrylic on glass). I also create text-based art, mostly overpainted books (negatexts). I also do performances and interventions that typically run for at least 8 hours."

He claims to have devised the longest acronym in the English language, Acronymic in his book Cipher and Poverty.

== Books ==
The following are some books by Schertzer:

- The House of Misfortune (1994). Tonguenail Books.
- Short Films from the 14th Century (1994). Exile Editions.
- A Hand for the Drowned (1994). Ekstasis Editions.
- A Personal Dictionary (1997). Tonguenail Books.
- Cipher and Poverty (The Book of Nothing) (1998). Ekstasis Editions.
- Absulation(1998). Self-published.
- Devil's Wine (2003). Self-published.
- Peindicy (2007). Exile Editions.

== Performances and interventions ==
- Opacity. Vancouver (2000)
- Les Essais
- Diderot 2013
- Les Ville Invisibles (Nuit Blanche 2015, Bruxelles)
- Pain Proust

== See also ==
- Lipogram
- Constrained writing
