= Note (typography) =

Text placed at the bottom of a page or at the end of a chapter

In publishing, a note is a brief text in which the author comments on the subject and themes of the book and names supporting citations. In the editorial production of books and documents, typographically, a note is usually several lines of text at the bottom of the page, at the end of a chapter, at the end of a volume, or a house-style typographic usage throughout the text. Notes are usually identified with superscript numbers or a symbol.

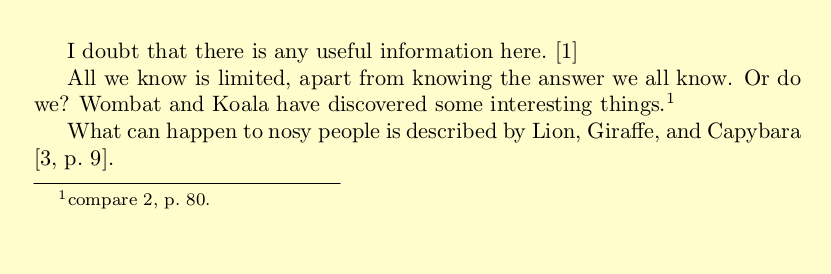
Standard usage of a footnote.

Footnotes are informational notes located at the foot of the thematically relevant page, whilst endnotes are informational notes published at the end of a chapter, the end of a volume, or the conclusion of a multi-volume book. Unlike footnotes, which require manipulating the page design (text-block and page layouts) to accommodate the additional text, endnotes are advantageous to editorial production because the textual inclusion does not alter the design of the publication. However, graphic designers of contemporary editions of the Bible often place the notes in a narrow column in the page centre, between two columns of biblical text.

== Numbering and symbols ==
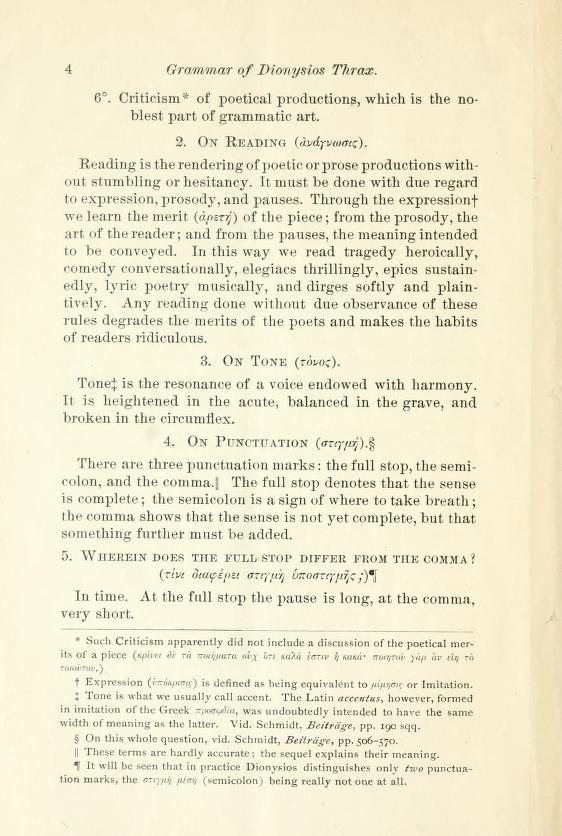
A page from The grammar of Dionysios Thrax, tr. Thomas Davidson, published in 1874, showing use of the unusual symbolic footnote indicators.

In English-language typesetting, footnotes and endnotes are usually indicated with a superscript number appended to the pertinent block of text. Typographic symbols are sometimes used instead of numbers, with their traditional ordering being:

1. Asterisk (*)
2. Dagger (†)
3. Double dagger (‡)
4. Section sign (§)
5. Double vertical bar (‖)
6. Pilcrow (¶)

Additional typographic characters used to identify notes include the number sign (#), the Greek letter delta (Δ), the diamond-shaped lozenge (◊), the downward arrow (↓), and the manicule (☞)—a hand with an extended index finger.

However, after the asterisk, the order of symbols may vary. For example, Northern Illinois University specifies that, after an asterisk, the order goes as:

1. Double asterisk (**)
2. Dagger (†)
3. Double dagger (‡)
4. Section sign (§)
5. Double vertical bar (||)
6. Number sign (#)
7. Pilcrow (¶)

United Nations specifies to use the order:

1. Asterisk (*)
2. Double asterisk (**)
3. Triple asterisk (***)
4. Quadruple asterisk (****)
5. Dagger (†)
6. Double dagger (‡)
7. Section sign (§)

United Nations further specifies that "When more than seven footnotes are needed, numbers are used instead of symbols." Custom or themed symbols are also possible. For example, Shift Happens: A book about keyboards by Marcin Wichary features "footnote symbols [...] custom designed for the book, inspired by keyboard symbols throughout the ages" On page 813, a ⌘ is used. On page 688, a ⎈ is used.

== Location ==
Footnote reference numbers ("cues") in the body text of a page should be placed at the end of a sentence if possible, after the final punctuation. This minimizes the interruption of the flow of reading and allows the reader to absorb a complete sentence-idea before having their attention redirected to the content of the note.

The cue is placed after any punctuation (normally after the closing point of a sentence). ... Notes cued in the middle of a sentence are a distraction to the reader, and cues are best located at the end of sentences.

== Academic usage ==
Notes are most often used as an alternative to long explanations, citations, comments, or annotations that can be distracting to readers. Most literary style guidelines (including the Modern Language Association and the American Psychological Association) recommend limited use of foot- and endnotes. However, publishers often encourage note references instead of parenthetical references. Aside from use as a bibliographic element, notes are used for additional information, qualification, or explanation that might be too digressive for the main text. Footnotes are heavily utilized in academic institutions to support claims made in academic essays covering myriad topics.

In particular, footnotes are the normal form of citation in historical journals. This is due, firstly, to the fact that the most important references are often to archive sources or interviews that do not readily fit standard formats, and secondly, to the fact that historians expect to see the exact nature of the evidence that is being used at each stage.

The MLA (Modern Language Association) requires the superscript numbers in the main text to be placed following the punctuation in the phrase or clause the note is about. The exception to this rule occurs when a sentence contains a dash, in which case the superscript would precede it. However, MLA is not known for endnote or footnote citations, and APA and Chicago styles use them more regularly. Historians are known to use Chicago style citations.

Aside from their technical use, authors use notes for a variety of reasons:

- As signposts to direct the reader to information the author has provided or where further useful information is pertaining to the subject in the main text.
- To attribute a quote or viewpoint.
- As an alternative to parenthetical references; it is a simpler way to acknowledge information gained from another source.
- To escape the limitations imposed on the word count of various academic and legal texts which do not take into account notes. Aggressive use of this strategy can lead to a text affected by "foot and note disease" (a derogation coined by John Betjeman).

== Government documents ==
The US Government Printing Office Style Manual devotes over 660 words to the topic of footnotes. NASA has guidance for footnote usage in its historical documents. The Energy Information Administration also published a guide, which itself refers to many more examples and sources.

== Legal writing ==
Former Associate Justice Stephen Breyer of the Supreme Court of the United States is famous in the American legal community for his writing style, in which he never uses notes. He prefers to keep all citations within the text (which is permitted in American legal citation). Richard A. Posner has also written against the use of notes in judicial opinions. Bryan A. Garner, however, advocates using notes instead of inline citations.

== HTML ==
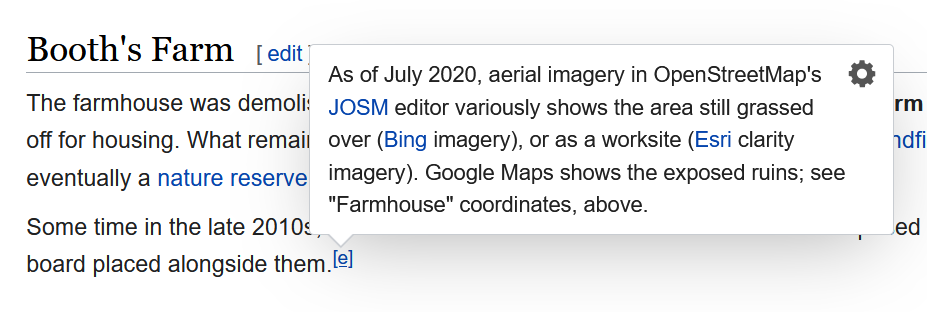
A footnote on the Wikipedia article "William Booth (forger)", rendered as a "pop up" over the relevant text

HTML, the predominant markup language for web pages, has no mechanism for adding notes. Despite a number of different proposals over the years, the working group has been unable to reach a consensus on it. MediaWiki, for example, has had to introduce its own <ref></ref> tag for citing references in notes.

The hyperlink partially eliminates the need for notes, being the web's way to refer to another document. However, it does not allow citing to offline sources, and if the destination of the link changes, the link can become dead or irrelevant. One solution is the use of a digital object identifier. As of 2024, the HTML Living Standard has provided several workarounds for including footnotes based on their length or type of annotation.

In instances where a user needs to add an endnote or footnote using HTML, they can add the superscript number using <sup></sup>, then link the superscripted text to the reference section using an anchor tag. Create an anchor tag by using <a name="ref1"></a> and then link the superscripted text to "ref1".

== History ==
Chuck Zerby identifies Richard Jugge's 1568 printing of the Bishops' Bible as an early example of footnote-like notes, with the reference marks "(f)" and "(g)" in Job directing readers to notes placed at the bottom of the page.

Early printings of the Douay–Rheims Bible used a four-dot punctuation mark (represented in Unicode as U+2E2C ⸬ SQUARED FOUR DOT PUNCTUATION) to indicate a marginal note. It can often be mistaken for two closely-spaced colons.

== Literary device ==
At times, notes have been used for their comical effect, or as a literary device.

- James Joyce's Finnegans Wake (1939) uses footnotes along with left and right marginal notes in Book II Chapter 2. The three types of notes represent comments from the three siblings doing their homework: Shem, Shaun, and Issy.
- J. G. Ballard's "Notes Towards a Mental Breakdown" (1967) is one sentence ("A discharged Broadmoor patient compiles 'Notes Towards a Mental Breakdown,' recalling his wife's murder, his trial and exoneration.") and a series of elaborate footnotes to each one of the words.
- Mark Z. Danielewski's House of Leaves (2000) uses what are arguably some of the most extensive and intricate footnotes in literature. Throughout the novel, footnotes are used to tell several different narratives outside of the main story. The physical orientation of the footnotes on the page also works to reflect the twisted feeling of the plot (often taking up several pages, appearing mirrored from page to page, vertical on either side of the page, or in boxes in the centre of the page, in the middle of the central narrative).
- Flann O'Brien's The Third Policeman (1967) utilizes extensive and lengthy footnotes for the discussion of a fictional philosopher, de Selby. These footnotes span several pages and often overtake the main plot-line, and add to the absurdist tone of the book.
- David Foster Wallace's Infinite Jest includes over 400 endnotes, some over a dozen pages long. Several literary critics suggested that the book be read with two bookmarks. Wallace uses footnotes, endnotes, and in-text notes in much of his other writing as well.
- Manuel Puig's Kiss of the Spider Woman (originally published in Spanish as El beso de la mujer araña) also makes extensive use of footnotes.
- Garrison Keillor's Lake Wobegon Days includes lengthy footnotes and a parallel narrative.
- Mark Dunn's Ibid: A Life is written entirely in endnotes.
- Luis d'Antin van Rooten's Mots d'Heures: Gousses, Rames (the title is in French, but when pronounced, sounds similar to the English "Mother Goose Rhymes"), in which he is allegedly the editor of a manuscript by the fictional François Charles Fernand d'Antin, contains copious footnotes purporting to help explain the nonsensical French text. The point of the book is that each written French poem sounds like an English nursery rhyme.
- Terry Pratchett has made numerous uses within his novels. The footnotes will often set up running jokes for the rest of the novel.
- B.L.A. and G.B. Gabbler's meta novel The Automation makes uses of footnotes to break the fourth wall. The narrator of the novel, known as "B.L.A.," tells the fantastical story as if true, while the editor, Gabbler, annotates the story through footnotes and thinks the manuscript is only a prose poem attempting to be a literary masterwork.
- Susanna Clarke's 2004 novel Jonathan Strange & Mr Norrell has 185 footnotes, adumbrating fictional events before and after those of the main text, in the same archaic narrative voice, and citing fictional scholarly and magical authorities.
- Jonathan Stroud's The Bartimaeus Trilogy uses footnotes to insert comical remarks and explanations by one of the protagonists, Bartimaeus.
- Michael Gerber's Barry Trotter parody series used footnotes to expand one-line jokes in the text into paragraph-long comedic monologues that would otherwise break the flow of the narrative.
- John Green's An Abundance of Katherines uses footnotes, about which he says: "[They] can allow you to create a kind of secret second narrative, which is important if, say, you're writing a book about what a story is and whether stories are significant."
- Dr Carol Bolton uses extensive footnotes to provide the modern reader with a cipher for a novel about the travels of the fictional Spanish traveller Don Manuel Alvarez Espriella, an early 19th-century construct of Robert Southey's, designed to provide him with vehicle to critique the societal habits of the day.
- Jasper Fforde's Thursday Next series exploits the use of footnotes as a communication device (the footnoterphone) which allows communication between the main character's universe and the fictional bookworld.
- Ernest Hemingway's Natural History of the Dead uses a footnote to further satirize the style of a history while making a sardonic statement about the extinction of "humanists" in modern society.
- Pierre Bayle's Historical and Critical Dictionary follows each brief entry with a footnote (often five or six times the length of the main text) in which saints, historical figures, and other topics are used as examples for philosophical digression. The separate footnotes are designed to contradict each other, and only when multiple footnotes are read together is Bayle's core argument for Fideistic skepticism revealed. This technique was used in part to evade the harsh censorship of 17th-century France.
- Mordecai Richler's novel Barney's Version uses footnotes as a character device that highlights unreliable passages in the narration. As the editor of his father's autobiography, the narrator's son must correct any of his father's misstated facts. The frequency of these corrections increases as the father falls victim to both hubris and Alzheimer's disease. While most of these changes are minor, a few are essential to plot and character development.
- In Vladimir Nabokov's Pale Fire, the main plot is told through the annotative endnotes of a fictional editor.
- Bartleby & Co., a novel by Enrique Vila-Matas, is stylized as footnotes to a non-existent novel.
- The works of Jack Vance often have footnotes, detailing and informing the reader of the background of the world in the novel.
- Stephen Colbert's I Am America (And So Can You!) uses both footnotes and margin notes to offer additional commentary and humor.
- Doug Dorst's novel S. uses footnotes to explore the story and relationship of characters V.M. Straka and F.X. Caldeira.
- Terry Pratchett and Neil Gaiman's collaboration, Good Omens, frequently uses footnotes to add humorous asides.
- The short story "The Fifth Fear" in Terena Elizabeth Bell's collection Tell Me What You See uses footnotes to make the science fiction story resemble a historical document.
- Douglas Adams used footnotes frequently in his Hitchhiker's Guide to the Galaxy series.

== See also ==
- Annotation
- Citation
- Hyperkino
- Ibid.
- Nota bene
- Wikipedia style guide for references
