= Pangram =

Sentence that uses every letter of a language's alphabet

A pangram, or holoalphabetic sentence, phrase, or word, uses every letter of a given alphabet at least once. Pangrams can be utilised to display typefaces, test equipment, or develop skills in handwriting, calligraphy, and typing, amongst other uses.

== Origins ==
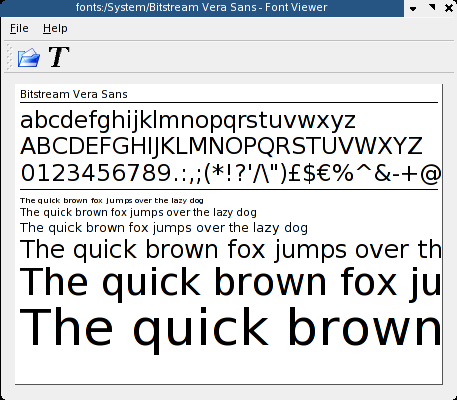
Font preview software using the English pangram "The quick brown fox jumps over the lazy dog" to demonstrate the typeface Bitstream Vera Sans at different sizes.

The best-known English pangram is "The quick brown fox jumps over the lazy dog". It has been used since at least the late 19th century and was used by Western Union to test Telex/TWX data communication equipment for accuracy and reliability. Pangrams like this are now used by a number of computer programs to display computer typefaces.

== Short pangrams ==
Short pangrams in English are more difficult to devise, and may require uncommon words or unlikely sentences. Longer pangrams afford more opportunity for clever or humorous turns of phrase.

The following table lists several pangrams of 35 letters or fewer that use no abbreviations or proper nouns:

Pangram	Number of words	Number of letters	Repeated letters	Refs
Quick nymph bugs vex fjord waltz.	6	27	U	
Waltz, bad nymph, for quick jigs vex.	7	28	A, I	
Glib jocks quiz nymph to vex dwarf.	7	28	I, O	
Sphinx of black quartz, judge my vow!	7	29	A, O, U	
How quickly daft jumping zebras vex!	6	30	A, E, I, U	
The five boxing wizards jump quickly.	6	31	E, I, U	
Jackdaws love my big sphinx of quartz.	7	31	A, I, O, S	
Pack my box with five dozen liquor jugs.	8	32	E, I, O, U	
The quick brown fox jumps over the lazy dog.	9	35	E, H, O, R, T, U	

== Perfect pangrams ==
A perfect pangram contains every letter of the alphabet only once; as such, it is an anagram of the alphabet. The only known perfect pangrams of the English alphabet use abbreviations or other non-dictionary words, such as "Blowzy night-frumps vex'd Jack Q." or "Mr. Jock, TV quiz PhD, bags few lynx." or they include words so obscure that the phrase is challenging to understand, such as "Cwm fjord-bank glyphs vext quiz", in which cwm is a loan word from Welsh meaning an amphitheatre-like glaciated depression, vext is an uncommon way to spell vexed, and quiz is used in an archaic sense to mean a puzzling or eccentric person. Taken together, it means "Symbols in the bowl-like depression on the edge of a long steep sea inlet confused an eccentric person".

Other writing systems may present more options: The Iroha is a well-known perfect pangram of the Japanese syllabary, while the Hanacaraka is a perfect pangram for the Javanese script and is commonly used to order its letters in sequence.

== Other languages ==
=== Using the Latin script ===
Whereas the English language uses all 26 letters of the Latin script in native and naturalized words, many other languages using the same alphabet do not. Pangram writers in these languages are forced to choose between only using those letters found in native words or incorporating exotic loanwords into their pangrams. Some words, such as the Gaelic-derived whisk(e)y, which has been borrowed by many languages and uses the letters k, w and y, are frequent fixtures of many foreign pangrams.

There are also languages that use other Latin characters that do not appear in the traditional 26 letters of the Latin alphabet. This differs further from English pangrams, with letters such as ç, ä, and š.

==== Azerbaijani ====
Zəfər, jaketini də papağını da götür, bu axşam hava çox soyuq olacaq
Zafar, take your jacket and cap, it will be very cold tonight
Gecə ürəyiyumşaq əjdaha paxıl ovçunun tüfəngini söküb kağıza bükdü
At the night kind dragon wrapped in paper the rifle of the envious hunter

==== Czech ====
Příliš žluťoučký kůň úpěl ďábelské ódy
A horse that was too yellow moaned devilish odes
The most commonly used one, especially to test alphabet support with fonts. This sentence includes all Czech letters with diacritics, but not all basic letters.
Nechť již hříšné saxofony ďáblů rozezvučí síň úděsnými tóny waltzu, tanga a quickstepu
May the sinful saxophones of devils echo through the hall with dreadful melodies of waltz, tango and quickstep
Used to include all basic letters, including letters that only occur in loanwords (g, q, w, x).

==== Danish ====
Høj bly gom vandt fræk sexquiz på wc
Tall shy groom won naughty sexquiz on wc
A perfect pangram, using every letter exactly once (including the more unusual letters as q, w, and x, and including the Danish æ, ø, and å)

==== Dutch ====
Pa's wijze lynx bezag vroom het fikse aquaduct
Dad's wise lynx piously looked at the sizable aqueduct

==== Esperanto ====
Eble ĉiu kvazaŭ-deca fuŝĥoraĵo ĝojigos homtipon
Maybe every quasi-fitting bungle-choir makes a human type happy
Laŭ Ludoviko Zamenhof bongustas freŝa ĉeĥa manĝaĵo kun spicoj
According to Ludwig Zamenhof, fresh Czech food with spices tastes good
Eĥoŝanĝoj ĉiuĵaŭde
Echo-changes every Thursday
Doesn't contain every letter but contains all accented letters.

==== Estonian ====
See väike mölder jõuab rongile hüpata
This little miller can jump on a train

==== Ewe ====
Dzigbe zã nyuie na wò, ɣeyiɣi didi aɖee nye sia no see, ɣeyiɣi aɖee nye sia tso esime míeyi suku.
Ŋdɔ nyui, ɛ nyteƒe, míagakpɔ wò ake wuieve kele ʋ heda kpedeŋu.
Have a nice birthday tonight, it's been a long time no see, it's been a while since we were in school.
Good afternoon, yes, see you again at twelve o'clock in the morning.
A two-part pangram consisting of a statement and response.

==== Filipino ====
Buwitre ang pumukol kay Señor Hudas.
The vulture is the one who hit Mister Judas.
Kumusta Roxas, di ba aalis na kayo nina Victoria sa Quezon at pupunta ng Naga? Titingnan niyo ba ang Peñafrancia? Kung gayon huwag niyo na isama si Juan.
Hi Roxas, aren't you and Victoria leaving Quezon and going to Naga? Are you going to check out the Peñafrancia? If so don't bring Juan.

==== Finnish ====
Törkylempijävongahdus
Although difficult to translate because of its non-practical use, it roughly means a whinge of a sleazy lover
A perfect pangram not using any of the special letters used in Finnish only for foreign words (b, c, f, q, š, w, x, z, ž, å)
Albert osti fagotin ja töräytti puhkuvan melodian
Albert bought a bassoon and blew a puffing tune
An imperfect pangram not using some of the special letters used in Finnish only for foreign words (q, w, x, z, å) but which makes perfect everyday sense.
On sangen hauskaa, että polkupyörä on maanteiden jokapäiväinen ilmiö
It is rather fun that bicycles are a daily phenomenon on the countryroads
An imperfect pangram not containing the previously mentioned special letters.
Wieniläinen siouxia puhuva ökyzombi diggaa Åsan roquefort-tacoja
A/the Viennese rich zombie who can speak Sioux likes Åsa's Roquefort tacos
Contains all the letters of the Finnish alphabet.

==== French ====
Portez ce vieux whisky au juge blond qui fume
Take this old whisky to the blond judge who is smoking
Uses each basic consonant once, though not any letters with diacritics.
Les naïfs ægithales hâtifs d'Aÿ pondant à Noël où il gèle sont sûrs d'être déçus en voyant leurs drôles d'œufs abîmés
The naive, hasty aegithales of Aÿ who lay eggs at Christmas when it's freezing are sure to be disappointed when they see their funny eggs damaged
Contains the letters with diacritics, including ÿ (only found in place names) as well as the ligature letters œ (common in French) and æ (only used in loanwords).

==== German ====
Victor jagt zwölf Boxkämpfer quer über den großen Sylter Deich
Victor chases twelve boxers across the Great Levee of Sylt
Contains all letters, including the umlauted vowels (ä, ö, ü) and ß. The letter y is limited to loanwords and proper names like Sylt. (Note: Per the Deutsches Wörterbuch, the letter y was common in the German language until around the 16th century, when standardisation due to the rise of the printing press largely replaced it with the letter i. It remained in use in some cases until the 19th century, during which further spelling reforms restricted it to loanwords and proper names.)

==== Hungarian ====
Egy hűtlen vejét fülöncsípő, dühös mexikói úr Wesselényinél mázol Quitóban
An angry Mexican gentleman, pinching the ear of his unfainthful son-in-law, paints at Wesselényi's in Quito
Contains all letters of the Hungarian alphabet, for a total of 64 letters. "Fülöncsípő" is transliterated here to "pinching the ear", but can also mean catching someone.
Árvíztűrő tükörfúrógép
Flood-proof mirror-drilling machine
This nonsensical short phrase contains all diacritic variations of letters in the Hungarian alphabet and is usually used to test how fonts handle these accent marks.

==== Icelandic ====
Kæmi ný öxi hér, ykist þjófum nú bæði víl og ádrepa
If a new axe were here, thieves would feel increasing deterrence and punishment
Contains all 32 letters in the Icelandic alphabet including the vowels with diacritics (á, é, í, ó, ú, ý, and ö) as well as the letters ð, þ, and æ.

==== Indonesian ====
Muharjo seorang xenofobia universal yang takut pada warga jazirah, contohnya Qatar.
Muharjo is a universal xenophobic who fears the peninsula residents, such as Qatar
Contains all 26 letters in the Indonesian alphabet, including the foreign letters f, q, v, x and z.
Tokoh qari bonceng juru xilofon di vespanya muzawir.
The Quran reciter figure gives the xylophone expert a ride on the tour guide's moped.
Contains all 26 letters in the Indonesian alphabet. It also contains only words that are in the Kamus Besar Bahasa Indonesia.

==== Irish ====
D'ith cat mór dubh na héisc lofa go pras
A large black cat ate the rotten fish promptly
Has 31 letters and includes all 18 letters found in native Irish words, but does not include the accented á, í, or ú, nor the non-accented e.
Chuaigh bé mhórshách le dlúthspád fíorfhinn trí hata mo dhea-phorcáin bhig
A maiden of large appetite with an intensely white, dense spade went through the hat of my good little porker
Uses 64 letters and includes all 18 letters found in native Irish words plus all vowels with and without accents.
If written with old-style poncanna séimhithe—
Ċuaiġ bé ṁórṡáċ le dlúṫspád fíorḟinn trí hata mo ḋea-ṗorcáin ḃig
—it uses 54 letters and also shows every letter capable of lenition with and without a dot.
D'fhuascail Íosa Úrmhac na hÓighe Beannaithe pór Éabha agus Ádhaimh
Jesus, Son of the blessed Virgin, redeemed the seed of Eve and Adam
Has 58 letters and shows all 18 letters found in native Irish words. Shows all accented vowels as capitals.

==== Italian ====
Pranzo d'acqua fa volti sghembi
A lunch of water makes twisted faces
has 26 letters and includes all 21 letters found in native Italian words. It does not include the five letters which are only found in loanwords: j, k, w, y, and x.
Quel vituperabile xenofobo zelante assaggia il whisky ed esclama: alleluja!
That despicable, zealous xenophobe, tastes whisky and exclaims: Hallelujah!
Contains all the 26 letters of the alphabet, including the ones found in loanwords, archaic orthography and/or classical morphemes.

==== Kurdish ====
Cem vî Feqoyê pîs zêdetir ji çar gulên xweşik hebûn
There were more than four beautiful flowers near the filthy Feqo
Has 42 letters and includes all 31 letters found in Kurdish words. This pangram was created by Îrec Mêhrbexş in 2023.

==== Malay ====
Muzafar kerap sembahyang dan baca al-Quran waktu belajar di Universiti Oxford.
Muzafar often prayed and read the Quran while studying at the University of Oxford.
Contains all 26 letters in the Malay Latin alphabet.

==== Norwegian ====
Sær golfer med kølle vant sexquiz på wc i hjemby
Strange golfplayer with club won sexquiz on wc in hometown

==== Polish ====
Zażółć gęślą jaźń
Make the ego yellow with a gusle
Contains all diactrics, but not every letter and is mainly used to test font support.
Pchnąć w tę łódź jeża lub ośm skrzyń fig
Push a hedgehog or eight crates of figs in this boat
Most commonly used, perfect pangram, archaic spelling of osiem.
Mężny bądź, chroń pułk twój i sześć flag
Be brave, protect your regiment and six flags
Another pangram in common use.
Stróż pchnął kość w quiz gędźb vel fax myjń
The watchman pushed the bone/dice into a quiz of the musics or a fax of the washes
A perfect pangram containing all letters, including those used only in loan words: q, v, x.

==== Portuguese ====
Vejo galã sexy pôr quinze kiwis à força em baú achatado.
I see a sexy hunk forcibly stuff fifteen kiwis into a shallow trunk.
Uses all diacritics (but not all diacriticized letters) and all letters from the Portuguese alphabet (including the foreign letters k, w, and y incorporated into the alphabet by the Orthographic Agreement of 1990).

Vejo coxo gritando que fez show sem playback.
I see a hobbler yelling that he performed the show without playback.
Uses all letters from the Portuguese alphabet (including the letters k, w, and y), but no diacritics. Loans the words show and playback from the English language.

==== Romanian ====
Încă vând gem, whisky bej și tequila roz, preț fix.
[I'm] still selling jam, beige whisky, and pink tequila, [with a] fixed price.
Contains all letters, including Romanian diacritics: ă, â, î, ș, and ț. The letters q, w, and y were introduced in the Romanian alphabet in 1982 with the first DOOM dictionary. They are used for loan words such as quodlibet, watt, and yoga. The letter k is also rarely used, mainly for names and international neologisms such as kilogram and folk.

==== Serbian ====
Љубазни фењерџија чађавог лица хоће да ми покаже штос.
Ljubazni fenjerdžija čađavog lica hoće da mi pokaže štos.
A kind lamplighter with a sooty face wants to show me a prank.
Can equally be written in gajica.

==== Spanish ====
Benjamín pidió una bebida de kiwi y fresa. Noé, sin vergüenza, la más exquisita champaña del menú
Benjamin ordered a kiwi and strawberry drink. Noah, without shame, the most exquisite champagne on the menu
Uses all diacritics and the foreign letters k and w.
El veloz murciélago hindú comía feliz cardillo y kiwi. La cigüeña tocaba el saxofón detrás del palenque de paja.
The quick Hindu bat was happily eating cardillo and kiwi. The stork was playing the saxophone behind the straw palenque.
Contains 2 sentences and 92 letters; it is used in Microsoft Windows operating system if the language is set to Spanish (Español).

==== Slovak ====
Vypätá dcéra grófa Maxwella s IQ nižším ako kôň núti čeľaď hrýzť hŕbu jabĺk.
Earl Maxwell's tense daughter with an IQ lower than a horse is forcing farmhands to bite a heap of apples.
Kŕdeľ šťastných ďatľov učí pri ústí Váhu mĺkveho koňa obhrýzať kôru a žrať čerstvé mäso.
A flock of happy woodpeckers by the mouth of the river Váh is teaching a silent horse to nibble on bark and feed on fresh meat.
Missing f, g, j, l, q, w, x, y, as well as the accented vowel ó.

==== Swedish ====
Flygande bäckasiner söka hwila på mjuka tuvor
Flying snipes seek rest on soft tussocks
Missing q, x and z. Uses archaic spellings.
Yxmördaren Julia Blomqvist på fäktning i Schweiz
Axe killer Julia Blomqvist at fencing in Switzerland
Uses the name "Julia Blomqvist" and the Swedish name for Switzerland.
Schweiz för lyxfjäder på qvist bakom ugn
Switzerland brings luxury feather on branch behind oven
Feels quite contrived. The duplicated letters spell out serif.
FAQ om Schweiz: Klöv du trång pjäxby?
FAQ about Switzerland: Did you cleave a narrow village of ski boots?
Uses the English abbreviation FAQ alongside some made-up compounds.
Yxskaftbud, ge vår WC-zonmö IQ-hjälp
Axe-handle carrier, give our WC zone-maiden IQ support
Uses the English abbreviation IQ alongside two made up compounds.
Gud hjälpe Zorns mö qwickt få byx av
God help Zorn's maiden quickly get her pants off
Uses both old-fashioned spelling and the dialectal form byx.
Byxfjärmat föl gick på duvshowen
Foal without pants went to the dove show
Missing q and z.

==== Tamajeq ====
Xa bălla imuzărăn naŋŋin wər gəmmiyăn âr taggaẓt dəɣ Məššina fəl ad agəẓ ṭǝma n ăɣrǝm han măqqăja săkṣoḍnen.

==== toki pona ====
jan li pana e moku tawa sina
The person gives you food
Contains all the letters found in core words. It is commonly used to test constructed writing systems.

==== Turkish ====
Pijamalı hasta yağız şoföre çabucak güvendi
The sick person in pyjamas quickly trusted the swarthy driver
Contains all of the letters in the Turkish alphabet.

==== Welsh ====
Ni pharciais fy nghas gar ffabrig pinc a'm jac codi baw hud llawn dŵr chwerw ger tŷ Mabon ar ddydd Mawrth, ond parciais fe mewn lagŵn rhydlyd
I didn't park my least favourite pink fabric car and my magical digger full of bitter water by Mabon's house on Tuesday, but I parked it in a rusty lagoon
Uses all the letters of the Welsh alphabet including the loan letter j.

==== Vietnamese ====
Trường quê em do bố của em xây kĩ nên sạch và đẹp lắm
My countryside school is built thoroughly by my father, so it's very clean and pretty
A more grammatically correct form of Trường quê sạch và đẹp lắm do bố xây kĩ, and contains all the letters and diacritics of the Vietnamese alphabet.

=== Other alphabetic scripts ===
Non-Latin alphabetic or phonetic scripts such as Greek, Armenian, and others can also have pangrams. In some writing systems, exactly what counts as a distinct symbol can be debated. For example, many languages have accents or other diacritics, but one might count "é" and "e" as the same for pangrams. A similar problem arises for older English orthography that includes the long s ("ſ").

==== Arabic ====
نص حكيم له سر قاطع وذو شأن عظيم مكتوب على ثوب أخضر ومغلف بجلد أزرق
Wise text with a decisive secret and great significance, written on a green cloth and wrapped in blue leather

==== Armenian ====
Չին ֆիզիկոսը օճառաջուր ցողելով բժշկում է հայ գնդապետի փքված ձախ թևը։
The Chinese physicist treats the swollen left arm of the Armenian colonel by spraying it with soapwater

==== Belarusian ====
У Іўі худы жвавы чорт у зялёнай камізэльцы пабег пад'есці фаршу з юшкай
In Iwye, a thin, lively devil in a green vest ran to eat minced meat with soup
Я жорстка заб'ю проста ў сэрца гэты расквечаны профіль, што ходзіць ля маёй хаты
I will brutally kill this flowery profile that walks by my house straight to the heart

==== Bulgarian ====
Под южно дърво, цъфтящо в синьо, бягаше малко пухкаво зайче
Under a southern tree, blooming in blue, ran a little fluffy bunny
За миг бях в чужд, скърцащ плюшен фотьойл
For a moment I was in an unfamiliar squeaky plush armchair
Ах, чудна българска земьо, полюшвай цъфтящи жита!
Oh, wonderful Bulgarian land, whirl blooming wheats!
Я, пазачът Вальо уж бди, а скришом хапва кюфтенца зад щайгите!
Hey, Valyo the guard is pretending to watch, but he's secretly eating meatballs behind the crates!

==== Burmese ====
သီဟိုဠ်မှ ဉာဏ်ကြီးရှင်သည် အာယုဝဍ္ဎနဆေးညွှန်းစာကို ဇလွန်ဈေးဘေးဗာဒံပင်ထက် အဓိဋ္ဌာန်လျက် ဂဃနဏဖတ်ခဲ့သည်။
A wise wizard from Ceylon took on a commitment and explicitly read the recipe for the elixir of life on the almond tree beside the Zalun Market

==== Georgian ====
გვიპყრობდა კვამლი, ჩიტებს გაჰქონდათ ჟღურტული ზეცაში, ძილს უფრთხობს ჭიქების ჯახუნი მიწებში
We were overcome by smoke, the birds were carried away by chirping in the sky, sleep is disturbed by the clatter of glasses on the ground

==== Greek ====
Ξεσκεπάζω την ψυχοφθόρα σας βδελυγμία
I uncover your soul-crushing disgust

==== Hebrew ====
קזחסטן ארץ מעלפת, גדושה בכי
Kazakhstan is a beautiful country, full of tears
שפן אכל קצת גזר בטעם חסה, ודי
A bunny ate some lettuce-flavored carrots, and he had enough
איש עם זקן טס לצרפת ודג בחכה
A man with a beard flew to France and fished with a fishing pole
כך התרסק נפץ על גוזל קטן שדחף את צבי למים
That's how the explosives fell on the little chick that pushed Tzvi into the water
דג סקרן שט בים, מאוכזב ולפתע מצא חברה
A curious fish swimming in the sea is disappointed and suddenly finds a friend

There is also a version with every niqqud included (with repetitions) except the Sin dot:

עֲטַלֵּף אָבָק נָס דֶּרֶךְ מַזְגָן שֶׁהִתְפּוֹצֵץ כִּי חַם
A "dust bat" escaped through the air conditioner, which exploded due to the heat

This version is from the Cairo Geniza, and contains all final letter forms:

הָקֵץ עָצֵל דַּיָּךְ מִנּוּם גָּרֵשׁ כָּזָב פֶּן תֹּסֶף חֵטְא
Awake, sluggard, you have slept enough; cast out falsehood, lest you add sin

==== Korean ====
다람쥐 헌 쳇바퀴에 타고파.
Squirrels ride on the old wheel.
Microsoft Windows uses this phrase to test Korean fonts, which uses all of the basic Hangul consonants but not all of the vowels.
키스의 고유 조건은 입술끼리 만나야 하고 특별한 기술은 필요치 않다.
The unique conditions of a kiss are to meet the lips and do not require any special skills.
This example pangram uses all 24 basic letters.

==== Punjabi (Shahmukhi) ====
ڈِٹھے پار پہاڑ حضوری دے، طلسمی ژالہ باری ظلمت دی ۔
فیر جاکے ٹِبے غار حراء دے، خبر دِتتِی چاراں پاسے۔
اک ذہین زور آور نے فقیری دی۔ ہس کے نالے گج وج کے
ذمے داری نال دسیا ثمر صبر دا، حاصل عشق دا،
جیہڑا ہے کل پیغام

Seen across the mountains of salvation, the enchanted hail of darkness.
Then, at the cave of Hira's mound, the news was spread in all directions.
A wise and powerful one embraced the path of a faqir.
With smiles and resounding calls,
With responsibility,the fruit of patience was shared, and gains of love,
Which is the essence of the entire message.
Punjabi Shahmukhi pangram, written by Akhter Mehmood

==== Persian ====
بر اثر چنین تلقین و شستشوی مغزی جامعی، سطح و پایهٔ ذهن و فهم و نظر بعضی اشخاص واژگونه و معکوس می‌شود.

As a result of such comprehensive indoctrination and brainwashing, the level and some people's minds, understanding, and opinions are turned upside-down and reversed.

==== Russian ====
Съешь ещё этих мягких французских булок, да выпей же чаю
Eat some more of these soft French pastries and drink some tea
Most commonly used. Its variation is used by Windows FontView.
В чащах юга жил бы цитрус? Да, но фальшивый экземпляр!
Would a citrus live in the jungles of the south? Yes, but a fake specimen!
This pangram is used by GNOME.

==== Shan ====
ပေႃးၶႂ်ႈၵျၶႅၼ်ႇၵႂႃႇၸိုင် တေလႆႈႁွင်ႉသြႃႇလီရဵၼ်းႁူႉသွၼ်ၽိုၵ်း
ၺႃးမိူဝ်ႈၾႃႉပၢင်ႇ ၸၢႆးသၢင်ႇလႄႈ ယိင်းဢိူၺ်ႉပေၼိုၵ်း
သိူဝ်းၵျေႃႇတိုၵ်းထႃႈ ၸံလႄႈတင်းၵႆၼၼ်ႉသႃႊ။
To master a craft and excel in the art,
Seek out a wise mentor to guide from the start;
Beneath the clear heavens, Sai Saang and Ying Oei reflect,
Embracing the journey—both near and far—with joy and respect.

==== Thai ====
นายสังฆภัณฑ์ เฮงพิทักษ์ฝั่ง ผู้เฒ่าซึ่งมีอาชีพเป็นฅนขายฃวด ถูกตำรวจปฏิบัติการจับฟ้องศาล ฐานลักนาฬิกาคุณหญิงฉัตรชฎา ฌานสมาธิ
Mr. Sangkhaphant Hengpithakfang – an elderly man who earns a living by selling bottles – was arrested for prosecution by police because he stole Lady Chatchada Chansamat's watch
Contains all the consonant letters in the Thai alphabet, both obsolete and non-obsolete.

==== Ukrainian ====
Єхидна, ґава, їжак ще й шиплячі плазуни бігцем форсують Янцзи
Echidna, hooded crow, hedgehog and also hissing reptiles are crossing Yangtze in a rush

==== Urdu ====
نہ ژالہ باری نہ دھوپ پڑتی نہ ٹمٹماتی ہے چاندنی اب
نہ کوئی ساغر نہ آگ برکھا،عجیب طرز فنا چلی اب
جدا حلاوت ، خفا ظرافت،ضعیف ہر شوق، ڈر نہ صدمہ
ثمر جو ذکر حبیب کا ہے یہ تجھہ کو عرفی ملا سبھی اب
No more hailstorms, no more sunshine, No moonlight flickers in the night.
No goblets raised, no rain of fire — A strange new way of perishing is in sight.
Sweetness is lost, wit is annoyed, Every passion weakened, no fear, no fright.
The only fruit now is the name of the Beloved — This, Urfi, is all you have left in this life.
Urdu pangram written by Syed Irfan Urfi

=== Non-alphabetic scripts ===
Logographic scripts, or writing systems such as Chinese that do not use an alphabet but are composed principally of logograms, cannot produce pangrams in a literal sense (or at least, not pangrams of reasonable size). The total number of signs is large and imprecisely defined, so producing a text with every possible sign is practically impossible. However, various analogies to pangrams are feasible, including traditional pangrams in a romanization.

In Japanese, although typical orthography uses kanji (logograms), pangrams can be made using every kana, or syllabic character. The Iroha is a classic example of a perfect pangram in non-Latin script.

In Chinese, the Thousand Character Classic is a 1000-character poem in which each character is used exactly once; however, it does not include all Chinese characters. The single character 永 (permanence) incorporates all the basic strokes used to write Chinese characters, using each stroke exactly once, as described in the Eight Principles of Yong.

Among abugida scripts, an example of a perfect pangram is the Hanacaraka (hana caraka; data sawala; padha jayanya; maga bathanga) of the Javanese script, which is used to write the Javanese language in Indonesia.

==== Bengali ====
ঊনিশে কার্তিক রাত্র সাড়ে আট ঘটিকায় ভৈরবনিবাসী ব্যাংকের ক্ষুদ্র ঋণগ্রস্ত অভাবী দুঃস্থ প্রৌঢ় কৃষক এজাজ মিঞা হাতের কাছে ঔষধ থাকিতেও ঐ ঋণের ডরেই চোখে ঝাপসা দেখিয়া বুকের যন্ত্রণায় ঈষৎ কাঁপিয়া উঠিয়া উঠানে বিছানো ধূসর রঙের ফরাশের উপর ঢলিয়া পড়িলেন।
On the nineteenth of Kartik, at eight-thirty o’clock at night, Ejaz Mia, a small-loan-indebted, destitute, old farmer residing in Bhairab, despite having medicine at hand, out of fear of that loan, seeing blurry-eyed and trembling slightly from the pain in his chest, collapsed onto the grey-coloured mat spread in the courtyard.

All 50 letters of the Bengali alphabet are present in this pangram published in Shubach Little Mag. This sentence consists of all vowels, vowel diacritics, and consonants, but does not contain all conjunct consonants.

==== Sanskrit ====
Sanskrit pangrams focus on consonants alone, since Sandhi rules make it extremely difficult to create a pangram showing vowels distinctly.

घटाश्च शङ्खाश्च धरन्ति तोयम् ।
शठादिमूढा न भजन्ति सत्यम् ।
वराहयूथानि किलन्ति पुच्छैः ।
गडेषु झञ्झाः सबलं फणन्ते ॥
Earthen pots and conches hold water.
Stupid imposters don't serve the truth.
Herds of pigs play with their tails.
Stormy winds blow gustily through the fences.
The above has been composed by Saurabh B, in the उपेन्द्रवज्रा (Upēndravajrā) meter, and contains all consonants of Classical Sanskrit.

== Self-enumerating pangrams ==
A self-enumerating pangram is a pangrammatic autogram, or a sentence that inventories its own letters, each of which occurs at least once. The first example was produced by Rudy Kousbroek, a Dutch journalist and essayist, who publicly challenged Lee Sallows, a British recreational mathematician resident in the Netherlands, to produce an English translation of his Dutch pangram. In the sequel, Sallows built an electronic "pangram machine", that performed a systematic search among millions of candidate solutions. The machine was successful in identifying the following 'magic' translation:

This pangram contains four As, one B, two Cs, one D, thirty Es, six Fs, five Gs, seven Hs, eleven Is, one J, one K, two Ls, two Ms, eighteen Ns, fifteen Os, two Ps, one Q, five Rs, twenty-seven Ss, eighteen Ts, two Us, seven Vs, eight Ws, two Xs, three Ys, & one Z.

Chris Patuzzo was able to reduce the problem of finding a self-enumerating pangram to the boolean satisfiability problem. He did this by using a made-to-order hardware description language as a stepping stone and then applied the Tseytin transformation to the resulting chip.

== Pangrams in literature ==
The pangram "The quick brown fox jumps over the lazy dog", and the search for a shorter pangram, are the cornerstone of the plot of the novel Ella Minnow Pea by Mark Dunn. The search successfully comes to an end when the phrase "Pack my box with five dozen liquor jugs" is discovered (which has only 6 duplicated vowels).

The scientific paper Cneoridium dumosum (Nuttall) Hooker F. Collected March 26, 1960, at an Elevation of about 1450 Meters on Cerro Quemazón, 15 Miles South of Bahía de Los Angeles, Baja California, México, Apparently for a Southeastward Range Extension of Some 140 Miles has a pangrammatic title.

== See also ==
- Panalphabetic window
- Pangrammatic window
- Pangrammatic lipogram
- Pandigital number, the same idea for integers in a given base
- Abecedarium – Inscription consisting of the letters of an alphabet
- Ambigram – Symmetrical calligraphic or typographic visual pun
- Chromatic scale – Musical scale set of twelve pitches
- Music written in all major or minor keys
- Heterogram – Word, phrase or sentence with no repeated letter
- Lipogram – Writing that avoids specific letters
