= Tula Springs =

Tula Springs is a fictional town in the Florida Parishes of Louisiana, and the setting of a series of novels by the American novelist James Wilcox. Starting with Wilcox's acclaimed debut novel Modern Baptists (1983), Tula Springs has served as the setting for five subsequent novels: North Gladiola (1985), Miss Undine's Living Room (1987), Sort of Rich (1989), Heavenly Days (2003), and Hunk City (2007). Wilcox's other novels (set in New York) include brief mentions of Tula Springs or characters with ties to the town.

Michiko Kakutani wrote in her review of Sort of Rich in The New York Times: "Tula Springs is one of those peculiar outposts of the New South - half suburb, half small town, poised between a quickly receding pastoral past and a greedy, consumerist future. It's the kind of place where people are ignorant about the details of the Civil War, but up on the latest kinds of sunlamps and Jacuzzis; the kind of place where long-haired ex-hippies cheerfully vote for Reagan, and housewives divide their time between therapy sessions and church choir meetings." Other reviewers have compared Tula Springs to William Faulkner's fictional Yoknapatawpha County.
