= The Automation =

2014 anonymous mythpunk novel

- First edition
- Author: Anonymous
- Language: English
- Genre: Fantasy
- Publisher: SOBpublishing
- Publication date: July 7, 2014
- Publication place: United States
- Media type: Print (paperback)
- Pages: 364
- ISBN: 978-0692259719
- Followed by: The Pre-programming

The Automation is an indie, mythpunk novel by an anonymous author using the dual pen names B.L.A. and G.B. Gabbler, about the god Vulcan's Automata which function off their human Master's souls. Gabbler is known as the "Editor" and annotates the story, as if it was just a work of literature, through footnotes while B.L.A. is the "Narrator" and tells the fantastical story as if it were true. The Automation is the first volume in a projected trilogy called the Circo del Herrero series, or The Blacksmith's Circus series.

== Plot summary ==
Odys Odelyn is given a coin by a mysterious man named Pepin Pound just before the man kills himself. The coin is the inanimate form of an Automaton - a creation of the god Vulcan. She is one of nine such creations that the god has left on the earth after serving her previous purpose. Pepin had to kill himself in order to free her for a new Master. Humans with Automata are called Masters, and the Automata are activated by the Master's soul and are just another vessel for their Master, yet with the knowledge and memories of their previous Masters. There is a rogue Master, Leeland, wanting to collect all the Automata under one Master because he believes they are evil and create strife when held individually. The other Masters have banded together to protect themselves, but their organization is threatened when Vulcan hints at a new plan for his creations - one that has been using all their actions and feuds to further his grand design.

The Narrator of the book claims to be a character in the story, though does not reveal their identity until the end. The Editor, Gabbler, claims to know the Narrator personally and believes the story to hold literary merit and contain half-truths. Their genders are kept hidden.

== Characters ==
- Odys Odelyn – The character through whose eyes the reader learns about the Automatons.
- Odissa Odelyn - Odys's twin sister, who is kidnapped so that the other Masters can control him.
- Maud - Odys's new Automaton, activated by his soul upon first skin contact.
- Pepin J. Pound - Maud's previous Master who committed suicide.
- Dorian Dandor - Another Master who is blind and sees through his Automaton, Fletcher.
- Fletcher - Dorian's Automaton who helps Dorian kidnap Odissa.
- Mother - Her real name is "Gwendolyn" but she is the leader of the Masters who have banded against Leeland.
- Leeland - The Master in love with Mother who kills Masters for their Automatons.
- Mecca - The youngest Master, who is actually very old but does not grow up due to having his Automaton, Q.
- Q - The Automaton and babysitter of Mecca.
- Bob - A Master whose husband was killed by Leeland.
- Cestus - Bob's Automaton.
- Madus - The missing Automaton that no one knows what Pepin did with.
- Rosemund - A Master who Odys and Maud have to visit at the end of the novel.
- Bulfinch - Odissa's pet cat.

== Reception ==
Publishers Weekly called the book "amusing," though noted that the meta nature of the novel could draw the reader away from the underlying story. BookLife picked up the book for review and selected it for a complementary curation in PW Select.

Tales of the Talisman gave The Automation 4.5 talismans out of 5, and observed that the characters "are being manipulated by the author and editor, who break the fourth wall in running commentary that bounces between text and the footnotes..." and that the story brings "the gods into the modern world." Kirkus called the 10th anniversary combined edition of volume 1 and 2 a "delightfully unorthodox tale of gods and immortality".

Author Adam Oster calls The Automation "a hard book to categorize. It’s a little experimental, a little goofy, and a little science-fiction-y, while also hosting a bit of Greek myth and hard boiled detective novel-style narration."
