= Iroha =

Japanese pangram poem

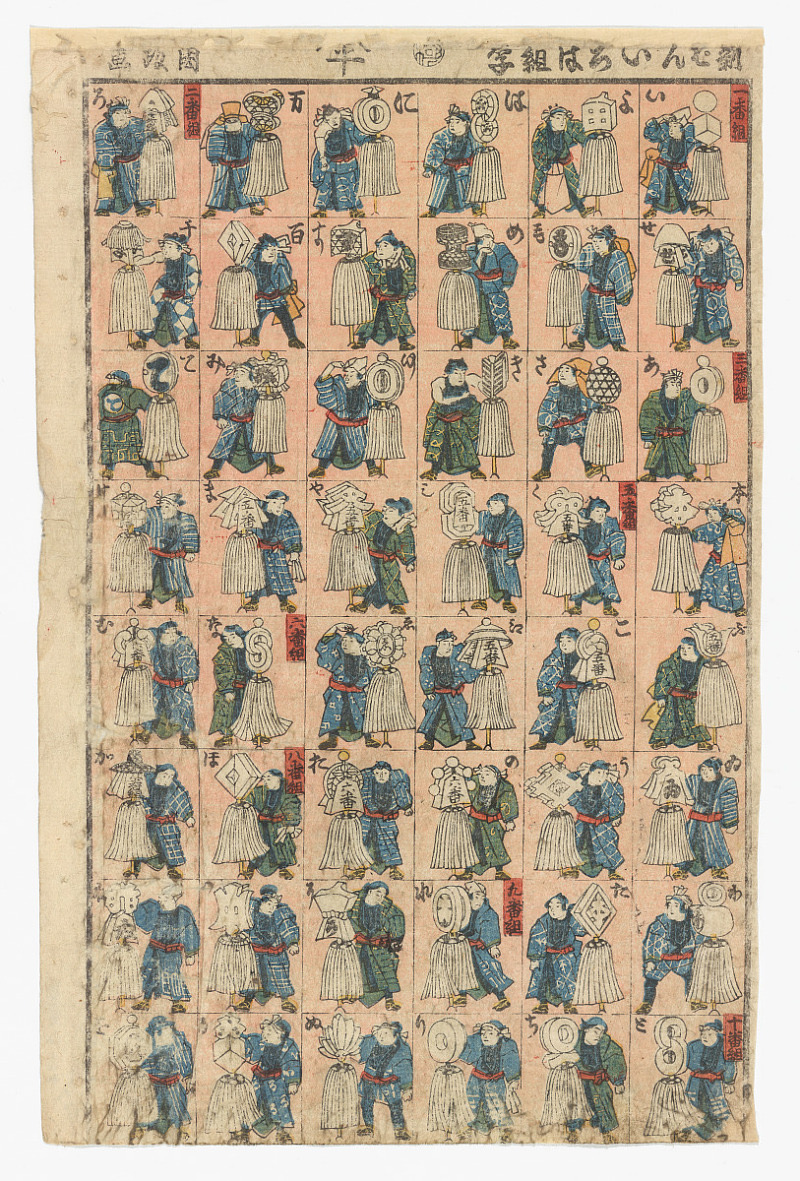
- Firefighters' insignia organized according to the Iroha
- Original title: いろは歌
- Country: Japan
- Language: Japanese/hiragana

The Iroha (いろは) is a Japanese poem. Originally the poem was attributed to Kūkai, the founder of Shingon Buddhism, but more modern research has found the date of composition to be later in the Heian period (794–1179). The first record of its existence dates from 1079. It is famous because it is a perfect pangram, containing each character of the Japanese syllabary exactly once. Because of this, it is also used as an ordering for the syllabary, in the same way as the A, B, C, D... sequence of the Latin alphabet.

== Text ==
The first appearance of the Iroha, in Konkōmyōsaishōōkyō Ongi (金光明最勝王経音義; 'Readings of Golden Light Sutra') was in seven lines: six with seven morae each, and one with five. It was also written in man'yōgana.

以呂波耳本部止
千利奴流乎和加
餘多連曽津祢那
良牟有為能於久
耶万計不己衣天
阿佐伎喩女美之
恵比毛勢須

Structurally, however, the poem follows the standard 7–5 pattern of Japanese poetry (with one hypometric line), and in modern times it is generally written that way, in contexts where line breaks are used. The text of the poem in hiragana (with archaic ゐ and ゑ but without voiced consonant marks) is:

Archaic		Modern		Ordering (see usage)	Translation
hiragana	transliteration	kanji and hiragana	pronunciation	numbers	
いろはにほへと	Iro fa nifofeto	色は匂えど [いろはにおえど]	Iro wa nioedo	1–7	Even the blossoming flowers [Colors are fragrant, but they]
ちりぬるを	Tirinuru wo	散りぬるを [ちりぬるを]	Chirinuru o	8–12	Will eventually scatter
わかよたれそ	Wa ka yo tare so	我が世誰ぞ [わがよだれぞ]	Wa ga yo dare zo	13–18	Who in our world
つねならむ	Tune naramu	常ならん [つねならん]	Tsune naran	19–23	Shall always be? (= つねなろう)
うゐのおくやま	Uwi no okuyama	有為の奥山 [ういのおくやま]	Ui no okuyama	24–30	The deep mountains of conditions—
けふこえて	Kefu koyete	今日越えて [きょうこえて]	Kyō koete	31–35	We cross them today
あさきゆめみし	Asaki yume misi	浅き夢見じ [あさきゆめみじ]	Asaki yume miji	36–42	And we shall not have shallow dreams
ゑひもせす	Wefi mo sesu	酔いもせず [えいもせず]	Ei mo sezu¹ Yoi mo sezu	43–47	Nor be intoxicated.

Note that:

- Archaic, obsolete, and historical hiragana uses ゐ (historic Japanese wi, modern i) and ゑ (historic Japanese we, modern e), which are now only used in proper names and certain Okinawan orthographies.
- Modern writing uses voiced consonant marks (with dakuten). This is used as an indicator of sound changes in the spoken Japanese language in the Heian era.
- The consonant /h/ in Japanese (a voiceless glottal fricative) was historically pronounced as /ɸ/ (a voiceless bilabial fricative) before the occurrence of the so-called hagyō tenko (“'H'-row (kana) sound shift”, ハ行転呼). Due to phonological changes over history, the pangram poem no longer matches today's pronunciation of modern kana.
- The mora e (spelt え & 衣) and ye had merged into /je/ in the 10th century, slightly before the poem was written down in 1079.
- Note 1: The verb form 酔い ("being intoxicated; intoxication") may be read in modern kana pronunciation as either ei, the archaic pronunciation based on the original kana spelling ゑひ (wefi in Classical Japanese), or as yoi, the modern reading after sound changes caused the base verb form eu to shift to you. The difference in reading depends on the intention of the rendering: keeping closer to the original, or keeping closer to modern usage.

An English translation by Professor Ryuichi Abe reads as:

Although its scent still lingers on
the form of a flower has scattered away
For whom will the glory
of this world remain unchanged?
Arriving today at the yonder side
of the deep mountains of evanescent existence
We shall never allow ourselves to drift away
intoxicated, in the world of shallow dreams.

Komatsu Hideo has revealed that the last mora of each line of the Man'yō-gana original (止加那久天之須), when put together, reveals a hidden sentence, toka [=toga] nakute shisu (咎無くて死す), which means "to die without wrong-doing". It is thought that this might be a eulogy in praise of Kūkai, further supporting the notion that the Iroha was written after Kūkai's death.

== Usage ==
The Iroha contains every kana only once, with the exception of ん (-n), which was not distinguished from む mu in writing until the early 20th century (see Japanese script reform). For this reason, the poem was frequently used as an ordering of the kana until the Meiji era reforms in the 19th century. Around 1890, with the publication of the Wakun no Shiori (和訓栞) and Genkai (言海) dictionaries, the gojūon (五十音, literally "fifty sounds") ordering system, which is based on Sanskrit, became more common. It begins with a, i, u, e, o then ka, ki, ku... and so on for each kana used in Japanese. Although the earliest known copy of the gojūon predated the Iroha, gojūon was considered too scholarly and had not been widely used.

Even after widespread use of gojūon in education and dictionaries, the Iroha sequence was commonly used as a system of showing order, similarly to a, b, c... in English. For example, Imperial Japanese Navy submarines during the Second World War had official designations beginning with I (displacement 1,000 tonnes or more), Ro (500 to 999 tonnes), and Ha (less than 500 tonnes). Also, Japanese tanks had official designations partly using Iroha ordering, such as Chi-ha (ha meaning the third model). Other examples include subsection ordering in documents, seat numbering in theaters, and showing go moves in diagrams (kifu).

=== Current uses ===
The Iroha sequence is still used today in many areas with long traditions. Most notably, Japanese laws and regulations officially use Iroha for lower-level subsection ordering purposes, for example 第四十九条第二項第一号ロ (Article 49, Section 2, Subsection 1-ro). In official translation to English, i, ro, ha... are replaced by a, b, c... as in 49(2)(i)(b).

In music, the notes of an octave are named i ro ha ni ho he to, written in katakana.

Musical notes
English, Balkan and Northern European	C	D	E	F	G	A	B
Southern European	Do	Re	Mi	Fa	Sol	La	Si
Japanese	ハ (ha)	ニ (ni)	ホ (ho)	ヘ (he)	ト (to)	イ (i)	ロ (ro)

Iroha was also used in numbering the classes of the conventional train cars of Japanese National Railways (now the JR Group). I was first class (no longer used), ro was second class (now "Green car") and ha was third class (standard carriages).

Some Japanese expressions are only understandable when one has knowledge of the Iroha. The word iroha (イロハ, often in katakana) itself can mean "the basics" in Japanese, comparable to the term "the ABCs" in English. Similarly, Iroha no i (イロハのイ) means "the most basic element of all". I no ichiban (いの一番, "number one of i") means "the very first".

Iroha karuta, a traditional card game, is still sold as an educational toy.

Irohazaka (いろは坂), a one-way switchback mountain road in Nikkō, Tochigi, is named for the poem because it has 48 corners. The route was popular with Buddhist pilgrims on their way to Lake Chūzenji, which is at the top of the forested hill that this road climbs. While the narrow road has been modernized over the years, care has been taken to keep the number of curves constant.

HTML's ordered list tag <ol> supports the CSS property list-style-type=hiragana-iroha (or katakana-iroha) to label the list elements with the Iroha kana instead of the default Arabic numerals.

== Origin ==
Authorship is traditionally ascribed to the Heian era Japanese Buddhist priest and scholar Kūkai (空海) (774–835). However, this is unlikely as it is believed that in his time there were separate e sounds in the a and ya columns of the kana table. The え (e) above would have been pronounced ye, making the pangram incomplete.

It is said that the Iroha is a transformation of the "Gatha on Impermanence" verses in the Nirvana Sutra:

諸行無常
是生滅法
生滅滅已
寂滅為楽

which translates into

All acts are impermanent
That's the law of creation and destruction.
When all creation and destruction are extinguished
That ultimate stillness (nirvana) is true bliss.

The above in Japanese is read

Shogyō mujō
Zeshō meppō
Shōmetsu metsui
Jakumetsu iraku

== See also ==
- Ametsuchi no Uta (an earlier pangram)
- Heavenly stems, a Chinese-originating set of ordinals
- Japanese literature

=== Other languages ===
- Abecedarius
- Alphabet song
- Shiva Sutra, Sanskrit poem with similar function
- Hanacaraka, the traditional arrangement of the letters of the Javanese alphabet
- The quick brown fox jumps over the lazy dog, commonly used English phrase with every letter in the Latin alphabet
- Thousand Character Classic, Chinese poem with similar function, especially used in Korea

== Notes ==
=== References ===
- Abe, Ryuichi (1999). The Weaving of Mantra: Kûkai and the Construction of Esoteric Buddhist Discourse. Columbia University Press. ISBN 0-231-11286-6.
