= Lebdeğmez =

Traditional Turkish poetic competition

"Lebdeğmez atışma" or "Dudak değmez aşık atışması" in Turkey, whose literal meaning in Turkish is "two troubadours throwing verses at each other where lips do not touch each other", is the traditional and still practiced event of oratory match, a form of instantaneously improvised poetry sang by opposing Ashiks taking turns for artfully criticising each other with one verse at a time, is done by each first placing a pin between their upper and lower lips so that the improvised song, usually accompanied by a Saz (played by the ashik himself), consists only of labial lipograms i.e. without words where lips must touch each other, effectively excluding the letters B, F, M, P and V from the text of the improvised songs.

== See also ==
- Flyting
- Battle rap
- Dozens (game)
- Skald
- Minstrel
