= James Wilcox (novelist) =

American novelist

- Born: April 4, 1949 (age 77); Hammond, Louisiana, U.S.
- Education: Yale University
- Occupations: Novelist, professor
- Writing career
- Genre: Literary fiction

James Wilcox (born April 4, 1949, in Hammond, Louisiana) is an American novelist and a professor at Louisiana State University in Baton Rouge. James Wilcox worked at Random House and Doubleday in New York after graduating from Yale. Wilcox was a recipient of a Guggenheim Fellowship in 1986.

== Career ==
Wilcox is the author of nine comic novels mostly set in, or featuring characters from, the fictional town of Tula Springs, Louisiana. Modern Baptists (1983, the first of these works, remains his best known novel. Guest of a Sinner is set in New York City with characters from Tallahassee. Polite Sex (1991) and Plain and Normal are set mainly in New York City, but they do have a few characters who come from Tula Springs.

Wilcox is also the author of three short stories that were published in The New Yorker between 1981 and 1986. He was the subject of an article by James B. Stewart in The New Yorker's 1994 summer fiction issue; entitled "Moby Dick in Manhattan", it detailed his struggle to survive as a writer devoted purely to literary fiction.

Wilcox's book reviews have appeared in The New York Times Book Review, Los Angeles Times Book Review, and Elle. He has been a judge for the PEN/Hemingway Award for the best first-published book of fiction by an American writer published in 1991; for the 1994 Barnes & Noble Discover Great New Writers Award; for the Pirate's Alley Faulkner Society novella contest in 1999; and for the Eudora Welty Prize for Fiction given by The Southern Review in 2005.

He was the recipient of an ATLAS grant for 2007–08. Wilcox was the recipient of the 2011 Louisiana Writer Award presented by the Louisiana Center for the Book in the State Library of Louisiana at its annual Louisiana Book Festival.

He was the Robert Penn Warren Professor at LSU from 2004 to 2007 and then Donald and Velvia Crumbley Professor from 2007 to 2010. LSU recognized him as the 2008 Distinguished Research Master of Arts, Humanities, & Social Sciences. In 2009 he won an LSU Distinguished Faculty Award. Wilcox formerly held the MacCurdy Distinguished Professorship and served as Director of Creative Writing at LSU. He is listed as emeritus Faculty.

== Bibliography ==
- Modern Baptists (1983)
- North Gladiola (1985)
- Miss Undine's Living Room (1987)
- Sort of Rich (1989)
- Polite Sex (1991)
- Guest of a Sinner (1993)
- Plain and Normal (1998)
- Heavenly Days (2003)
- Hunk City (2007)
