= The Contortionist's Handbook =

2002 book by Craig Clevenger

- First edition cover
- Author: Craig Clevenger
- Cover artist: Jacket design by Dorothy Carico Smith
- Language: English
- Genre: Novel
- Publisher: MacAdam/Cage
- Publication date: September 2002
- Publication place: United States
- Media type: Print (Hardcover, Paperback)
- Pages: 199 pp (first edition, hardback)
- ISBN: 1-931561-15-X
- OCLC: 49680096
- Dewey Decimal: 813/.6 21
- LC Class: PS3603.L49 C66 2002
- Followed by: Dermaphoria

The Contortionist's Handbook is the debut novel by American novelist Craig Clevenger.

== Plot summary ==
John Dolan Vincent is a talented young forger with a proclivity for mathematics and drug addiction. In the face of his impending institutionalization, he continually reinvents himself to escape the legal and mental health authorities and to save himself from a life of incarceration. But running turns out to be costly. Vincent's clients in the L.A. underworld lose patience, the hospital evaluator may not be fooled by his story, and the only person in as much danger as himself is the woman who knows his real name.

== Characters ==
John Dolan Vincent

- Daniel John Fletcher:
- Brian Delvine: The alias Vincent used while living in Los Angeles. He then became Martin Kelly to cover up traffic warrants, an eviction, and a drug screening.
- Martin Kelly: "Born to" Liam and Fiona Kelly, a deceased couple that Vincent had picked out of The Boston Globe.
- Paul MacIntyre: The identity Vincent created for the son of a stripper that had left and taken her son to live in Virginia before all of the paperwork could get pushed through.

Keara/Molly Wheeler
"The Evaluator"
Jeremy
Shelly
Mom
Dad
Officer Durrell
Brett
A childhood neighbor to Vincent, first seen meticulously cutting the front lawn while being berated by his mother. Eventually he is found to be visiting the same psychiatric doctor's office that the young John Dolan Vincent went to for treatment of his headaches. Brett is later pacing his front yard sans a lawnmower, being used as a foil to highlight the direction that John could have gone.
Brett's Mom
Dr. Gaines
Dr. Fred Smith
"The Prosecutor"
"The Defense Attorney"
Erica
Dr. Carlisle
Andrea
The sister of Keara's that moved to San Diego from the East Coast for graduate school. Keara visits her while John makes a new home and identities for he and Keara. Andrea also serves as the source of an argument between John and Keara, Keara clearly jealous of her sister (possibly alluding to a prior tryst between Andrea and one of Keara's lovers).
Sudden
The girl that turned John Dolan Vincent onto cocaine. She was a stripper that choked Vincent until he was unconscious while giving him a lap dance and she then stole his money. Three nights later they slept together.
Jimmy
The doorman of the nightclub where Sudden danced. He was Sudden's cocaine hookup, who then became Vincent's hookup, who then introduced him to Ray, Jimmy's hookup. The employers of the club became the source of Vincent's mob connections, as Vincent made social security numbers, passports, etc. for them. Jimmy insisted that Vincent meet with more people to work for, but when Vincent became Paul MacIntyre, Vincent decided to disappear instead.
Sharon
Worked with Sudden at the nightclub Vincent frequented. She needed her life to get cleaned up in order to keep her son that the State was threatening to take, so Vincent gave her and her son Paul new identities. Sharon took her son to live with her parents in Virginia, and so Vincent used the identity that he had made for her son to his advantage.
Natalie
Met Vincent while he was posing as Paul MacIntyre during a show at Coconut Teazer. The relationship was doomed from the start as her lifestyle was that of excess, and his of course one of staying invisible. On their first official date together, they went to a place where Vincent had failed to make a reservation. After waiting twenty-eight minutes, she gets indignant with him. He responds and she slaps him, twice. He drags her to her car and they proceed to have sex in the parking lot. The relationship continued on like this, she out of his league, her slumming it, both of them enjoying the violent activity behind closed doors. The relationship ended when she came to the conclusion that it would not work due to the two of them being an Aries.

== Reviews ==
- Tied Up In Knots - Irvine Welsh - http://www.guardian.co.uk
- Counter-Clevenger - Peter Conover - http://www.dailynexus.com

== U.S. editions ==
- MacAdam/Cage Publishing, September 2002. Hardback First Edition. ISBN 1-931561-15-X
- MacAdam/Cage Publishing, September 2003. Paperback Edition. ISBN 1-931561-48-6
- Fourth Estate, April 4, 2005. Hardback Second Edition. ISBN 0-00-719416-1

== See also ==
- Neo-noir
