= Craig Clevenger =

American author (born 1964)

- Born: 1964 (age 61–62); Dallas, Texas, U.S.
- Occupation: Novelist
- Writing career
- Period: 2002–present
- Genres: Transgressional fiction, neo-noir
- Notable works: The Contortionist's Handbook, Dermaphoria
- Website: craigclevenger.com

Craig Clevenger (born 1964) is an American author of contemporary fiction. Born 1964 in Dallas, Texas, he grew up in Southern California, where he studied English at California State University, Long Beach. He is the author of three novels, The Contortionist's Handbook and Dermaphoria, both released by MacAdam/Cage, and Mother Howl, published by Datura. His work has been classified by some as neo-noir and has received praise from such authors as Chuck Palahniuk and Irvine Welsh.

Clevenger lists among his influences Jim Thompson, James M. Cain, Edgar Allan Poe, Richard Matheson, Italo Calvino, Kōbō Abe, Steve Erickson, Mark Danielewski, Will Christopher Baer, Seth Morgan, James Ellroy, Michael Hogan, John O'Brien, Michael Ventura and Rupert Thomson.

Clevenger's third novel, Mother Howl, is based on his short story The Fade, which he adapted into a short film with director Scott Krinsky.

He shares a fan base with fellow authors Will Christopher Baer and Stephen Graham Jones.

== Novels ==
=== The Contortionist's Handbook ===
Clevenger's debut novel, The Contortionist's Handbook, was first published in 2002. It is the story of John Dolan Vincent, a prodigious forger who has been detained for a psychiatric interview following a near-fatal painkiller overdose. As the narrator bluffs his way through the interview in order to avoid being involuntarily institutionalized, he tells the reader his true story - the one he is not telling the psychiatrist - revealing both his past and the true nature of his circumstances. The Contortionist's Handbook has since been translated into five languages - German, Italian, Polish, Spanish and Brazilian Portuguese - as well as published in the United Kingdom by HarperCollins. Several other translations are forthcoming, including Russian and Japanese. Film rights for The Contortionist's Handbook were optioned in 2007 by Greenestreet Films. Miguel Sapochnik has been linked as director and Channing Tatum as star.

=== Dermaphoria ===
In 2005, MacAdam/Cage released Clevenger's second novel, Dermaphoria, the diary of an amnesiac LSD chemist who becomes addicted to a drug which synthesizes the feeling of human touch. Documentary film maker Ross Clarke will be making his narrative directorial debut with a film adaptation of the book adaptation. It has toured film festivals under the new name "Desiree" and now has a website. The director says news about its release will be released as soon as they are decided. It was filmed in New Orleans and stars Joseph Morgan, Ron Perlman, Walton Goggins and Kate Walsh. Musician Bill Brown composed the score for the film.

=== Mother Howl ===
Clevenger published his third novel, Mother Howl, in June 2023, through Angry Robot.

== Works ==
=== Fiction ===
- The Contortionist's Handbook
  - Hardcover, 2002; ISBN 1-931561-15-X
  - Paperback, 2003; ISBN 1-931561-48-6
- Dermaphoria
  - Hardcover, 2005; ISBN 1-931561-75-3
  - Paperback, 2006; ISBN 1-931561-75-3
- Mother Howl
  - Paperback, 2023 ISBN 978-1915523037

=== Short fiction ===
- "The Fade" on craigclevenger.com (2005)
- "The Numbers Game" in San Francisco Noir 2 (2009)
- "Mother Howl" on chuckpalahniuk.net (2009)
- "Subcarrier" on chuckpalahniuk.net (2009)
- "Mercury" in Sensitive Skin issue 3 (2010)
- "Act of Contrition" in Warmed and Bound (2011)
- "Obsolescence" in In Search of a City: Los Angeles in 1,000 Words (2011)
- "Drunk & DC" in Barrelhouse magazine, issue 10 (2012)
- "Chicken Wire" in //Black Clock// n°16 (2013)
- "The Confession of Adelai Shade" in The Booked Anthology (2013)
- "Vapor Trail" in The Sunday Rumpus (2014)

=== Nonfiction ===
- "Thirteen Hours at the Oakland Strike" on Huffington Post (2011)
- "Scotty's Last Name" on OccupyWriters.com (2011)
- "Neglected Authors: Seth Morgan" on LitReactor.com (2013)
- "High Priest of the Godless: A Jim Thompson Primer" on LitReactor.com (2013)

=== Short film ===
"Smoke and Mirrors" (2015) available from Six Finger Films (2015) due to this Kickstarter

== Sources ==
- MacAdam/Cage bio for Craig Clevenger
- Transcript of Chuck Palahniuk's Audio Blog Monday, August 18, 2003
- "Tied Up in Knots," Irvine Welsh for The Guardian, April 16, 2005
- "Greenestreet Books Deal" Variety.com May 2007
