= Modern Baptists =

1983 novel by James Wilcox

- First edition
- Author: James Wilcox
- Language: English
- Publisher: Bookthrift Co.
- Publication date: July 1983
- Publication place: United States
- Media type: Print
- Pages: 239
- ISBN: 0-385-27868-3
- Followed by: North Gladiola

Modern Baptists is the debut novel by American author James Wilcox, and his best known work. It was published in 1983.

== Plot introduction ==
Set in the fictional town of Tula Springs, Louisiana, the novel concerns middle-aged bachelor Bobby Pickens, the assistant manager of Sunny Boy Bargain Store and his half-brother F.X. A former actor and cocaine dealer, F.X. has just been released from Angola Prison and moves in with Bobby, his presence throwing all Bobby's foibles into sharp relief, leading to mistaken identity, romantic entanglement and a nervous breakdown, climaxing in a Christmas Eve party in a cabin on a poisoned swamp.

== Reception ==
Robert Penn Warren commented, "James Wilcox has made a tale that is realistic and fantastic, painfully comic, and, in a strange way, psychologically penetrating….There is no writer exactly like him. He is an original." On the front page of The New York Times Book Review, Anne Tyler wrote, "Every reviewer, no doubt, has methods for marking choice passages in a book. Mine is a system of colored paper clips; yellow means funny. Modern Baptists should be thick with yellow clips on every page, but it does even better than that. While I was reading it, I laughed so hard I kept forgetting my paper clips. Mr. Wilcox has real comic genius. He is a writer to make us all feel hopeful." Walker Percy called the novel "a beauty."

== Recognition ==
Modern Baptists has been included in Harold Bloom's The Western Canon and listed in GQ's 45th anniversary issue as one of the best works of fiction published in the past 45 years. In 1998 in U.S. News & World Report Toni Morrison counted Modern Baptists among her three "favorite works by unsung writers." In 2005 Modern Baptists was reissued in Great Britain in a Penguin Modern Classics edition with an introduction by the novelist Jim Crace. Moments of grace in Modern Baptists have been explored by Charles Pastoor.
