= MacAdam/Cage =

Book publisher

- Status: Defunct
- Founded: 1998
- Founder: David Poindexter
- Country of origin: United States
- Headquarters location: San Francisco
- Publication types: Books

MacAdam/Cage was a small publishing firm located in San Francisco, California. It was founded by publisher David Poindexter in 1998. In 2003, it published around 30 to 45 titles per year, primarily fiction, short story collections, history, biography, and essays, and had twelve employees. Most notably, it published The Time Traveler's Wife by Audrey Niffenegger and The Contortionist's Handbook by Craig Clevenger, and Sunset Terrace by Rebecca Donner. Publishers Weekly describes MacAdam/Cage as "one of the West Coast's most literary" independent publishing firms.

== History ==
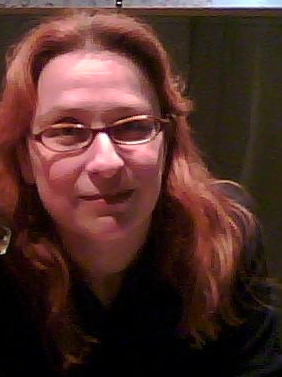
Audrey Niffenegger's The Time Traveler's Wife is the most successful book MacAdam/Cage has published.

Two years after founding MacAdam/Cage, Poindexter bought MacMurray & Beck, which added "an impressive backlist" to the firm, including Susan Vreeland's Girl in Hyacinth Blue and William Gay's The Long Home. The company's most successful publication has been Audrey Niffenegger's The Time Traveler's Wife, which had sold 2.5 million copies as of March 2009. Until then, its most successful publication had been Mark Dunn's Ella Minnow Pea, which sold 30,000 copies.

In 2004, the company launched a children's book division, headed by Chandler Crawford. The bulk of the children's books published by MacAdam/Cage are translations into English and out-of-print works. In the beginning, the company hoped to issue about eight titles a year and sell them to independent bookstores in particular.

In 2009, the company entered a debt crisis, unable to meet financial obligations. This led to lawsuit and complaints by writers regarding nonpayment, including Ed Cline known for his Sparrowhawk novels, Linda Robertson (What Rhymes with Bastard?) and Susan Vreeland over royalties for Girl in Hyacinth Blue. Other problems cited included a distribution channel change, issues with investors and the loss of an editor-in-chief. In early 2012, the company reported its debt problems had returned to manageable levels, in part through paring its staff to 3 with freelancers hired as-needed and resolving outstanding author claims through payment or rights reversion agreements. After a long hiatus, a spring catalog was presented in 2012.

The company filed for Chapter 7 bankruptcy on 17 January 2014.

== Mission ==
According to MacAdam/Cage, the company aims to "publ[ish] authors, not books", meaning they attempt to foster careers. Some of the authors they have signed include Mark Dunn, Michael Kun, Norman Gautreau, and Amanda Eyre Ward. According to Publishers Weekly, the firm is "earning a reputation for going to great lengths both to find and serve its authors". For example, MacAdam/Cage paid Stephen Elliott, author of Life Without Consequences, a stipend as he worked on his novel.

In 2004, The Observer reported that the company received about 100 unsolicited manuscripts each week, all of which are read. In the case of The Time Traveler's Wife, then-editor Anika Streitfield and Poindexter were so impressed with Niffinegger's novel that they offered her $100,000 at an auction for the rights, the largest advance they had ever offered an author. Although MacAdam/Cage was outbid, Niffenegger still chose the firm, explaining, "Once we [she and her agent] realised how committed they were to the book and how much they wanted to publish it, it was a pretty easy decision. In any case, my own natural inclination is to go small. My background is in punk music - I'd always pick the indie company over the giant corporation." Niffenegger described her relationship with MacAdam/Cage as "like being a member of a family".

Initially, the publishing house was devoted to literary fiction. With the resumption of operations, its catalog expanded to include genres such as true crime and automatic writing.

== Operations ==
The firm's editorial offices are located in San Francisco, California.

PGW was the firm's distributor. In April 2006, Random House Canada became its distributor in Canada with Doubleday Canada publishing the paperback versions of MacAdam's hardcovers there. In late 2008, as noted, the company experienced a "cash crunch", causing it to lay off several employees and delay new acquisitions.
