= Mark Dunn =

American author & playwright (b.1956)

- Born: July 12, 1956 (age 70); Memphis, Tennessee, U.S.
- Education: Memphis State University; University of Texas at Austin
- Occupations: Author, playwright

Mark Dunn (born July 12, 1956) is an American author and playwright. He studied film at Memphis State University (now the University of Memphis) followed by post-graduate work in screenwriting at the University of Texas at Austin moving to New York in 1987 where he worked in the New York Public Library while writing plays in his free time.

Among the 35 plays Dunn has written (as of 2023), Belles and Five Tellers Dancing in the Rain have been produced more than 150 times. Dunn served as playwright-in-residence with the New Jersey Repertory Company and the Community Theatre League in Williamsport, Pennsylvania.

Dunn is the author of the popular "progressively lipogrammatic" novel Ella Minnow Pea (2001).

In 1998, Dunn sued the writers, distributors and producers of The Truman Show, claiming that the story was based on a play he had written and performed Off-Broadway in 1992, Frank's Life.

== Personal life ==
Originally from Memphis, Dunn now resides with his wife, Mary, in Santa Fe, New Mexico.

== Published full-length plays ==
- Belles (1989)
- Minus Some Buttons (1991)
- Sand Pies and Scissorlegs (1992)
- Five Tellers Dancing in the Rain (1994)
- Judge and Jury (1994)
- Frank's Life (1998)
- Cabin Fever: A Texas Tragicomedy (2000)
- The Deer and the Antelope Play (2001)
- Helen's Most Favorite Day (2005)
- Dix Tableaux (2007)
- A Delightful Quarantine (2007)
- PIGmalion (2010)
- Seven Interviews (2014)
- LMNOP (2015)
- Belles: The Reunion (2016)
- Happily Ever After: A Wedding Comedy (2016)
- The Glitter Girls (2018)
- The Puzzle with the Piazza (2022)

== Books ==
- Ella Minnow Pea (2001)
- Welcome to Higby (2002)
- Ibid: A Life (2004)
- Zounds! A Browser's Dictionary of Interjections (2005)
- The Calamitous Adventures of Rodney And Wayne (2009)
- Under the Harrow (2012)
- American Decameron (2012)
- We Five (2015)
- Pentaptych (2018)
- Quizzing America: Television Game Shows and Popular Culture in the 1950s (2018)
- Texas People's Court: The Fascinating World of the Texas Justice of the Peace (2022)
