= Le Condottière =

Posthumous novel by Georges Perec

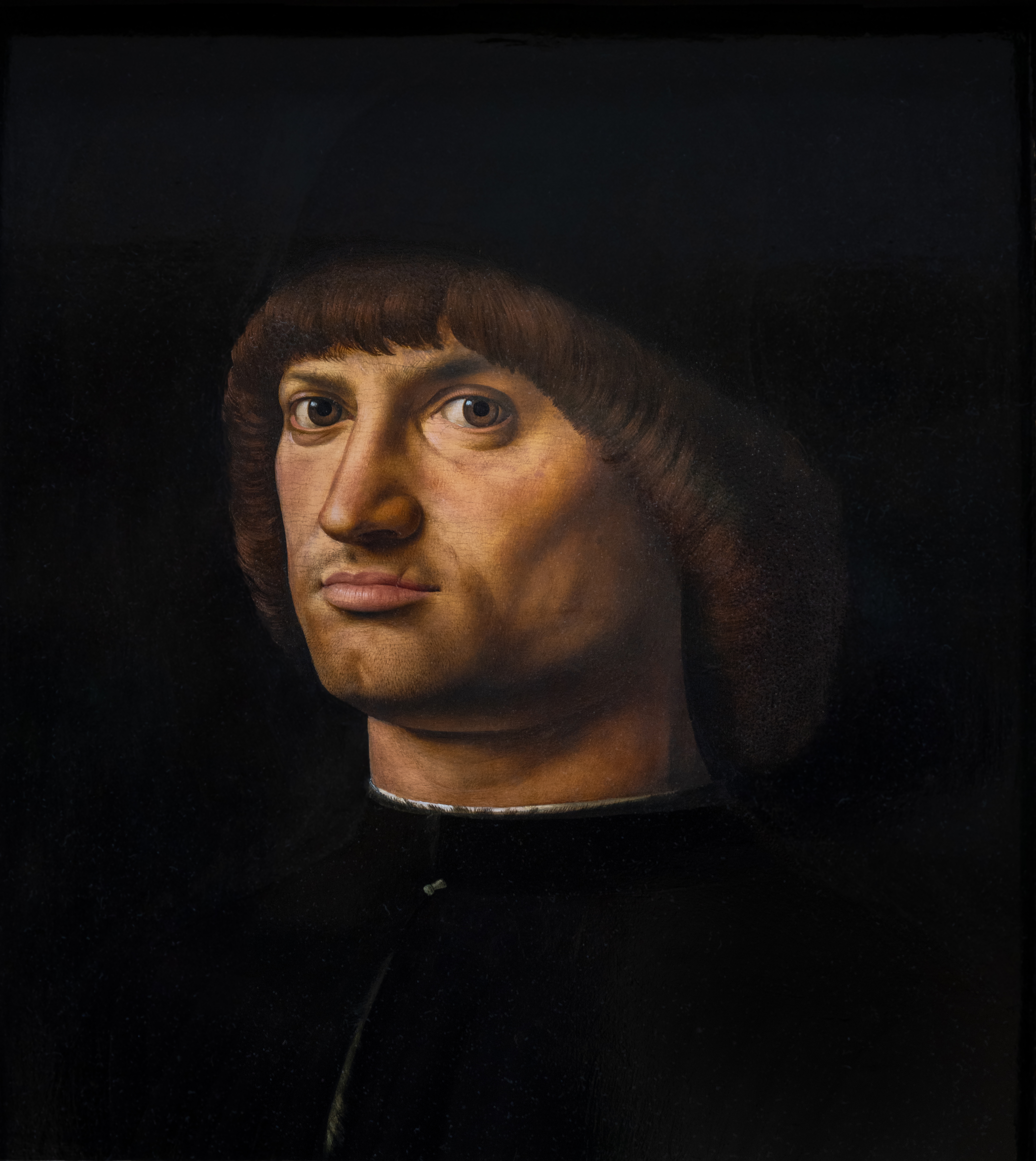
- Author: Georges Perec
- Illustrator: Antonello da Messina
- Language: French
- Genre: Narrative, Novel, Psychological thriller
- Publisher: Éditions du Seuil France
- Publication date: March 1, 2012
- Media type: Book
- Pages: 224
- Preceded by: Vœux
- Followed by: L'Attentat de Sarajevo

Le Condottière is a posthumous novel by the French writer Georges Perec, originally written between 1957 and 1960, but published in 2012 by the publishing house Seuil, in its collection "Librairie du XXe et du XXIe siècles" directed by Maurice Olender.

Its protagonist is Gaspard Winckler, a prominent forger of paintings by famous painters who has murdered his boss, Anatole Madera, after trying in vain to finish what would be his masterpiece, a condottiero that he would pass off as a creation of Antonello da Messina.

The book is dedicated to Jacques Lederer, with whom he corresponded, venting about the editorial rejection of the novel. Part of the contents of these letters, along with other editorial information, are included in a foreword written by Claude Burgelin, who also provides some biographical information about the author.

== Structure ==
The novel is narrated in multiple voices, jumping from the first person (soliloquy) to the second (self-interpellation) or third (novelistic narration). It also varies in verb tenses, sometimes referring to the present, sometimes to the past and sometimes to the future.

The work is divided into fourteen unnumbered sections. The first of these are mainly concerned with the dizzying thoughts of the protagonist, an artist who plans to escape from his basement-prison. After he manages to escape, towards the middle of the book, a more leisurely dialogue or interrogation between the protagonist and an interlocutor takes place, interrupted only by a first-person confession by the protagonist or by the aforementioned changes in the narrator's voice.

== Plot ==
The story centers around Gaspard Winckler, who is a remarkable thirty-three year old French forger of paintings, who since 1947 and for twelve years has forged more than a hundred paintings by various famous painters.

Like many others, I have descended into hell and, like some, I came out in part.

— Michel Leiris, Age of man, First epigraph of the book.

I will first recall the things which, received by the senses, I formerly held to be true, and the grounds on which my belief rested; then I will examine the reasons which have compelled me, later on, to call them into question. And, lastly, I will consider what I must now believe.

— René Descartes, Meditations on First Philosophy, Second epigraph.

Coming from a wealthy but distant family, he lived an idle youth, during which he discovered his painting skills. In 1943, at the age of seventeen, he met Jérôme in Geneva, who became his teacher. They worked together for two years, before graduating in one year as a restorer at the Rockefeller University in New York. After spending another six months at the Ecole du Louvre, he returned to Geneva, where Jérôme introduced him to Rufus, director of the Musée d'Art et d'Histoire, for whom he began working as a forger for the sheer joy of it. Just two years before, Rufus introduced him to Anatole Madera, who turned out to be the real boss of the business. Madera and Jérôme began working together in 1920, both in their early twenties. Rufus had joined the business in 1940, when he was in his early twenties.

Winckler worked incognito, taking no risks, enjoying a good salary and being pampered with all the comforts; however, over time he became aware of the false, lonely and enslaving world in which he found himself. He feared the same fate as his master Jérôme, who was also an enslaved counterfeiter: after suffering a premature old age that prevented him from continuing to work, he was given a generous pension and retired to Annemasse where, abandoned and with nothing to do, he died just two years later, in 1958.

More than a year and a half before, Madera asked Winckler personally to forge the painting of some Italian Renaissance painter. Despite his tedium, Winckler accepted the request, but for this occasion he set out to create a true masterpiece, rather than just a technically perfect reproduction. He thus decided to paint a condottiero, based exclusively on Antonello da Messina's Il Condottiero. He moved to the French commune of Dampierre, to the refurbished basement of Madera, where he worked for fifteen months, except for short breaks, enduring the impatience of his boss, who was used to him normally taking about two months for this type of painting. In the midst of his isolation, he learned of the death of his master and became irreconcilably estranged from his Parisian partner, Geneviève. Finally, the painting, almost finished, did not satisfy him and he considered it a failure. In desperation, he began to get drunk and to calm him down Rufus took him on vacation to Gstaad, a place that Winckler thought was a bad copy of his esteemed Altenberg and that did not manage to calm him down at all.

The narrative of the novel begins with the events after all that has been said above, in Orly, with Winckler carrying the beheaded body of Madera, whom he has murdered in cold blood and without remorse, after having decided to abandon his work with Il Condottiero. Outside the cellar where he is locked up, Otto Schnabel, Madera's valet, is waiting for him. Winckler fears that Otto is trying to communicate with Rufus and that Rufus may decide to kill him in revenge. Later, the protagonist manages to escape from the house by digging a hole in the walls with a chisel. He arrives at Streten's house in Paris, (Note: Claude Burgelin suggests that the dialogue in the second part of the novel is rather set somewhere in Yugoslavia) in whose workshop he had previously worked. Streten listens to him and Wickler confesses his crime. Now calmer, he acknowledges his fit of euphoria and irrationality, for in reality he had never been in real danger; although he did not regret Madera's death, he had no real reason to kill him either. Finally, Winckler decides to live on his savings for a few months, to abandon his activity as a forger and to start a new life.

== Interest in Il Condottiero ==
In his book W or the Memory of Childhood (1975), Perec himself comments on the empathy he feels for Antonello da Messina's painting Il Condottiero, partly because of the scar on the sitter's upper lip, a physical trait that Perec also possessed since his childhood. This scar was so significant to the author that he used it as the hallmark of one of the characters in A Void (1969) and was instrumental in the choice of actor Jacques Spiesser to star in his film Un Homme qui dort (1974). The painting by da Messina appears in that film and is mentioned in his book of the same name, A Man Asleep (1967).

== Publishing history ==
It was written by Perec between 1957 and 1960 in Paris, Navarrenx and Druyes-les-Belles-Fontaines. It was considered his first finished work, until the posthumous publication of L'Attentat de Sarajevo, written in 1957, when he was 21 years old.

Le Condottière changed its title, size and content several times. A first version was entitled La Nuit, which later became Gaspard, whose first version, of around three hundred and fifty pages, was rejected by Luc Estang for the Seuil publishing house. A new version, this time under the name Gaspard pas mort, of which only small fragments have survived, was closer to the structure of Le Condottière: a boy from Belleville (the Quarters of Paris where the author lived with his parents in his early childhood) longs to become a famous forger, but fails to copy a Giotto and must therefore flee from the police. The plot of this version was difficult to understand, and its structure seemed complex, being made up of subdivisions in powers of two: 22=4 parts of 24=16 chapters, 26=64 subchapters and 28=256 paragraphs. One of these versions of Gaspard pas mort met with the approval of Georges Lambrichs, director of the "Le Chemin" collection of Éditions Gallimard. Thanks to Lambrichs, in May 1959 Perec was given an advance of seventy-five thousand francs to round out his novel. Out of this instance came the first manuscript of Le Condottière in its present version, some one hundred and fifty-seven typewritten pages. Excerpts from a manuscript of Gaspard pas mort or Le Condottière written between 1958 and 1959 were previously published in Parcours Perec (1990).

The definitive version was written with several detentions, partly due to discouragement due to previous rejections, to his project for the magazine La Ligne générale and above all to the military service he had to perform between January 1958 and December 1959. Despite all these changes, the first sentence of the book ("Wood was heavy") was kept from the first versions. Finally, Le Condottière was rejected again in December 1960, while Perec was with his wife in Sfax, which caused him great disappointment. Shortly after this version, which is the one known, the author tried again to publish in 1961 a variation entitled J'avance masqué. This manuscript, which has been lost, was again rejected by Gallimard. Later, during a move in 1966, several other manuscripts were lost, including those of this novel. Perec believed until his death that the copies of this work had been completely lost. (Note: Perec laments the loss of the manuscripts of ''Le Condottière'' in his book W or the memory of childhood.)

Despite the above, Perec's English translator and biographer David Bellos, while in the early 1990s researching biographical material on the author for his book Georges Perec, une vie dans les mots (1994), found some duplicates of apparently lost manuscripts of the author, among them two copies of Le Condottière. The first copy was found at the home of L'Humanité expert journalist Alain Guérin. The second copy was one of several that Perec gave to his friends at the time he was working on the project for the magazine La Ligne générale. Claude Burgelin himself had received one of these copies, longer than the final published version, where Perec extended Winckler's excavation and Winckler fled through a subway passage.

== Reception and critique ==
Claude Burgelin, author of the prologue to the work, did not initially like the earlier, extended version of this novel and did not understand it. As for the version finally published, considering it in retrospect, he considered it a revealing and "exciting" re-reading, a "rough and sophisticated, rough and illuminating" text, related to the police novel.

Once published, the novel received a positive reception from the specialized critics. Christine Montalbetti in Le Monde highlighted this premature work by Perec as a way of approaching the author's biography from a new perspective. Baptiste Liger, for Lire magazine, also highlights its nods to the detective novel and its playful and existential character, so characteristic of his future novels. Philippe Lançon for Libération recognizes in it a first attempt by the author to approach what would later become his masterpieces. Tiphaine Samoyault, for La Quinzaine littéraire, relates this novel and the rest of his work to that of Jorge Luis Borges.

== Work analysis ==
This posthumous book, written at the beginning of Georges Perec's literary career, provides several antecedents to his subsequent books. The theme of imposture is used by the author later in the rest of his work, especially in books such as Life: A User's Manual and The Cabinet of an Amateur. Gaspard Winckler's name, for its part, reappears in W or the memory of childhood and Life: A User's Manual. Tedium and existentialism also reappear in A Man Asleep, while "the challenge of the impossible feat" in A Void, Les Revenentes, Life: A User's Manual, The Cabinet of an Amateur, among others. The use of physical space as a "mental prison" was also replicated in A Man Asleep, Life: A User's Manual and some other stories.

For Claude Burgelin, "Le Condottière is the story of a liberation" preceded by "the narration of a failure", as well as "the story of a revenge, as in Life: A User's Manual" is the relationship between the artisan Gaspard Winckler and the cold multimillionaire Percival Bartlebooth, who assumes a role similar to Anatole Wood, whose name in turn is significantly similar to that of Antonello da Messina. The author himself hoped it would be read as a "coming to consciousness."

Murder for the protagonist is here a liberating act, totally opposed to the absurdism of Albert Camus' The Stranger. Gaspard Winckler, as an assembler of puzzles from other and diverse works, is a "precursor" of the writer Georges Perec himself, who creates books instead of paintings. In "Les lieux d'un ruse", a text from the book Thinking/Classifying referring to his psychotherapy, the author resembles Winckler in his liberating desire to confront something that was only made for himself.

Burgelin also highlights the rootless past of the protagonist, as well as the eloquent mentions throughout the work of concentration camps, ghettos and Yugoslavia, which relate it to the childhood of the author from a Jewish family.

== Bibliography ==
- Perec, Georges (2003). W o el recuerdo de la infancia (in Spanish) (1st ed.). Barcelona: El Aleph Editores. p. 208. ISBN 84-7669-609-4.
- Perec, Georges (2013). El Condotiero (in Spanish) (1st ed.). Barcelona: Anagrama. p. 191. ISBN 978-84-339-7853-0.
- Several authors (1992). Georges Perec: Poética narrativa y teoría literaria (selección de textos). La experimentación oulipiana (in Spanish). Barcelona: Anthropos Editorial. p. 153. ISSN 1130-2089.
- Varios autores (2011). Pere(t)c: tentativa de inventario (in Spanish) (1st ed.). Madrid: Fundación Luis Seoane, Círculo de Bellas Artes, MAIA Ediciones. p. 424. ISBN 978-84-92724-26-0.
