= The Art of Asking Your Boss for a Raise =

Work by French author Georges Perec

- Author: Georges Perec
- Original title: L'art et la manière d'aborder son chef de service pour lui demander une augmentation
- Translator: David Bellos
- Language: French
- Genre: Prose
- Publisher: Verso Books
- Publication date: 1968
- English publication date: 2011
- ISBN: 178478656X

The Art of Asking Your Boss for a Raise (Note: The US version of the book has the title The Art of Asking Your Boss for a Raise on the cover) is a book by French writer Georges Perec (1936–1982). In 2011, publishing house Verso Books published a translation into English by David Bellos.

The original idea by Perec consists of:

- a longform text that consists of a single grammatical sentence in the second person plural, without punctuation, published in 1968 under the title L'art et la manière d'aborder son chef de service pour lui demander une augmentation;
- a 6-part radio play written by Perec in collaboration with his German translator, Eugen Helmlé, and broadcast by Saarländischer Rundfunk in 1969 under the German title Wucherungen; (Note: English: Proliferations)
- a 6-character play titled L'augmentation, (Note: English: The raise) which premiered on 26 February 1970 at the Théâtre de la Gaîté-Montparnasse in Paris, directed by Marcel Cuvelier.

== Publishing history ==
According to Bellos, who also wrote the prologue to the 2011 edition, the text was first published in December 1968 in issue 4 of journal Enseignement programmé (Hachette Livre), an academic review devoted to what was then called Programmed Learning, or computer-assisted education. The source text is based on a formal flowchart drawn up by Jacques Perriault, a researcher at the Computing Service of the Humanities Research Centre in Paris. Perriault came up with the idea to challenge an artist to write within a constraint that approximated the limitations of a computer's operations, that is, following or imitating a series of algorithms.

Around the time of its first publication, Perec was asked by his German translator, Eugen Helmlé, if he might come up with something suitable to broadcast on the radio. This became the radio play Wucherungen, broadcast by Saarländischer Rundfunk on 12 November 1969. (Note: There is also evidence of this radio play in a letter written by Perec to Maurice Nadeau, which was published posthumously in Je suis né (1990). The radio play was rebroadcast by Saarländischer Rundfunk on 9 September 1970, 16 October 1983, and possibly later. It was also broadcast by Westdeutscher Rundfunk on 27 January 1970 and 18 June 1981.) The huge success of this radio play prompted requests for more material.

For instance, in 1973, a slightly abridged version was published in journal Communications et langages. Then, in 1981, Hachette published the play L'Augmentation as part of its P.O.L. collection, along with the play La Poche Parmentier, in the book Théâtre I. La Poche Parmentier précédé de l'Augmentation.

In November 2007, while working on the Spanish translation of L'Augmentation, Pablo Moíño Sánchez found a copy of the 1967 edition at the Association Georges Perec. Thanks to this discovery, Hachette Livre was able to publish a new edition of the text in its original language, this time as a book, in November 2008.

== Structure ==
According to the language used by the OuLiPo group, the structure of these texts, based on the exhaustive description of all possible paths in a flowchart and with almost no progression in the events, corresponds to an "anti-arborescence", contrary to the "arborescent stories" that, in accordance to graph theory, seek to bifurcate events as much as possible, based on the consequences generated by the multiple possible alternatives. An example of Oulipo's independent arborescent stories are children's books in the Choose Your Own Adventure series.

Perec also used a similar structure in other texts, such as 81 fiches-cuisine à l'usage des débutants (in Penser/Classer, Hachette Livre, 1985 ISBN 2-01-011554-6), Deux cent quarante-trois cartes postales en couleurs vèritables (in L'Infra-ordinaire, Éditions du Seuil, 1989, ISBN 2-02-010899-2), and Exemple d'anagramme saturé (in Atlas de littérature potentielle, Éditions Gallimard, 1988, ISBN 2070325008).

== L'Augmentation theater play ==
Flowchart describing the structure of the play. Colors represent the chronological order in which each event is first described. Reiterations have been omitted. The highlighted box in the center represents the acceptance by the head of the department of the employee's request to go into his office; the basket represents the rejection of the request for a pay raise.

This play—the full title of which is L'Augmentation (ou Comment, quelles que soient les conditions sanitaires, psychologiques, climatiques, économiques ou autres, mettre le maximum de chances de son [sic] côte en demandant à votre chef de service un réajustement de votre salaire) (Note: English: The raise (or how to, regardless of the health, psychological, climatic, economic, or other conditions, get the maximum number of chances on your side by asking your head of department for a salary adjustment))—corresponds to the exhaustive description of a flowchart portraying various obstacles through which the employee of a company he has served for many years must pass in order to be able to meet with his department head and, unsuccessfully, ask him for a pay raise.

The characters in the play are not the individuals spoken about, such as the employee, his boss, and the latter's secretary, but rather the various components of the diagram, namely:

1. The proposition (represented by a rectangle);
2. the alternative (represented by a rhombus);
3. the positive hypothesis (what could happen if the arrow with the "yes" alternative is chosen);
4. the negative hypothesis (what could happen if the arrow with the "no" alternative is chosen);
5. the choice (the arrow chosen with the "yes" or "no" alternative); the conclusion (the rectangle or rhombus reached from the previous choice).

In addition, a character named Rubéole appears, which precisely represents this disease, mentioned in certain parts of the diagram.

The diagram that gives structure to the play is a simplified version of the one drawn in the book, which is in turn the one described in The Art and Craft of Approaching Your Head of Department to Submit a Request for a Raise.

=== Theatrical performances ===
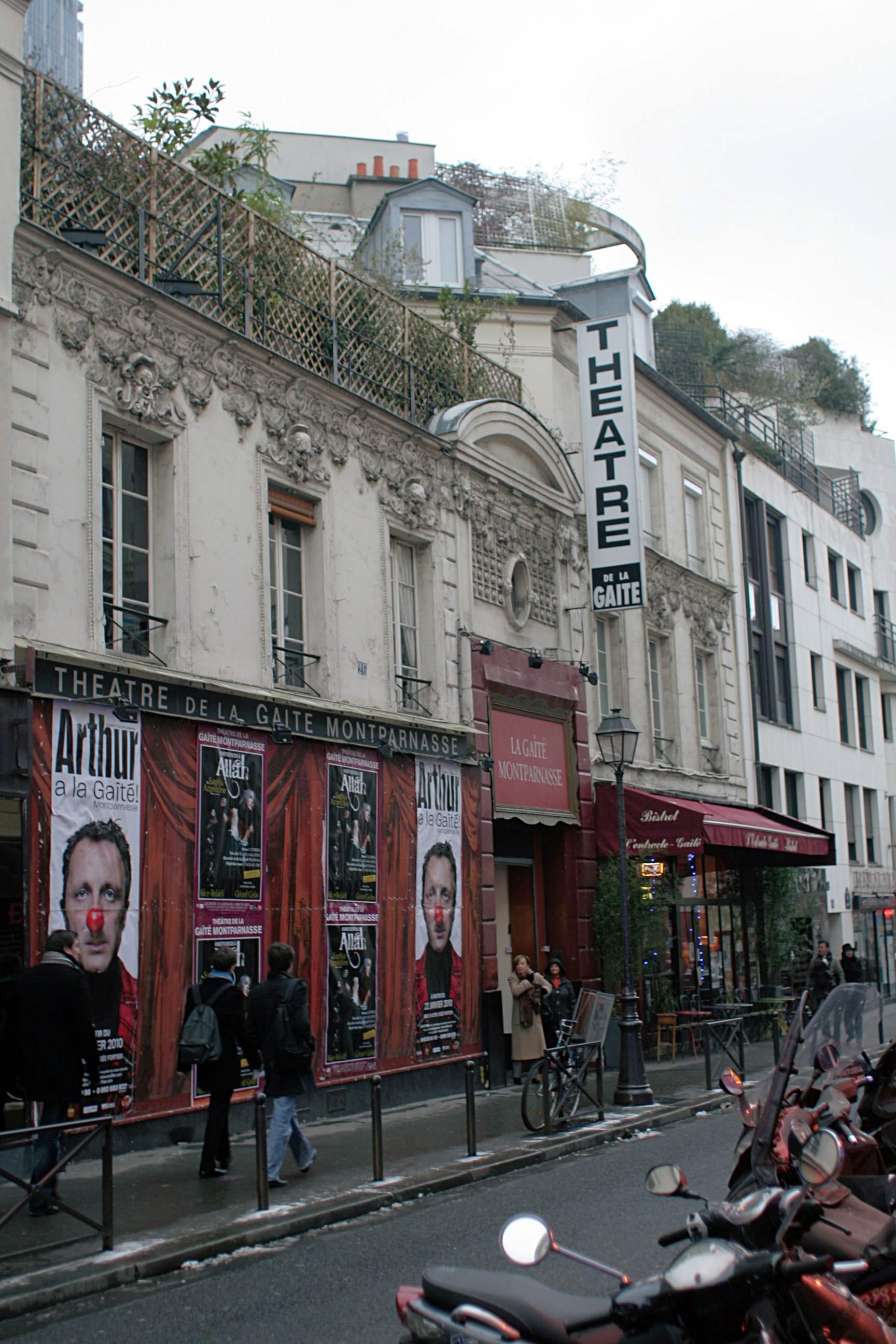
Théâtre de la Gaîté-Montparnasse in Paris, where the play was first performed in 1970.

This play was first performed on 26 February 1970 at the Théâtre de la Gaîté-Montparnasse in Paris, directed by Marcel Cuvelier. The cast was as follows:

- Marcel Cuvelier: The proposal
- Oliver Lebeaut: The alternative
- Monique Saintey: The positive hypothesis
- Frédérique Villedent: The negative hypothesis
- Yves Peneau: The choice
- Thérèse Quentin: The conclusion

The rubella character was replaced by a voice-over, played by Danielle Lebrun. A recording of these performances was broadcast on France Culture radio on 5 March 1972 under the title AudioPerec, along with other radio works by the writer.

Critical acclaim for the premiere was understated, but it achieved greater success at its revival in January 1981, at the Théâtre de la Comédie in Saint-Étienne, and for a three-month season starting in February 1982 at the Théâtre de la Huchette in Paris. Since then, the play has been staged by various theatre companies in France and abroad.

In German, it was directed by Anette Spola under the title Die Gehaltserhöhung, (Note: English: The pay raise) and premiered at the Theater am Sozialamt in Munich in November 1972. It was then performed in Münster, Wiesbaden, and other cities between February and June 1973.

In April 1988, playwright Sergi Belbel translated and staged a version in Catalan, with a minimalist staging and the title L'augment, (Note: English: The raise) at the Institut del Teatre in Barcelona.

Two years later, Enrico Groppali translated it into Italian as L'Aumento, (Note: English: The raise) and under the direction of Alessandro Marinuzzi it was staged in Udine and Trieste in 1990, and in Milan in May 1991. Between October and December 1991, Magnus Hedlund's Swedish version Löneförhöjningen (Note: English: The pay raise) was presented in Stockholm, directed by Karl Dunér.

Around the year 2000, Jesús Díez staged the play once again in Catalan, but this time using a baroque, Brechtian aesthetic that played with farce and clown elements. The production was staged at Teatreneu, and featured performances by, among others, actors Pep Anton Muñoz and Carles Sales, the latter playing the characters of "The conclusion" and Perec himself.

The play was translated into Spanish by Argentine director Carlos Mathus in 2001 with the title El aumento de sueldo. (Note: English: The pay raise) He directed and staged it that same year at Teatro Empire in Buenos Aires. A few years later, the play was staged in Chile by director Carolina Sagredo. The adaptation consisted of a monologue performed by José Soza with music by Andrés Núñez, thanks to funding by FONDART. After more than a year of rehearsals, it premiered with fourteen performances, between 18 March and 10 April 2016, at the Centro Cultural Matucana 100.

== The longform text ==
Flowchart described exhaustively in the text, which corresponds to the one drawn in the book. The content of each box is excluded here.

This text follows the same plot of the play, but describes a longer outline. It is not written as a theater play, but rather as a long text without any punctuation marks. Nevertheless, the same idea is maintained of describing first a proposition, then the two possible alternatives, the positive and negative hypotheses, and finally the choice and its corresponding conclusion, thus starting again with a new proposition of the scheme.

Interspersed throughout the text are eleven drawings that are related to the plot, some of which are repeated: a woman, a clock, a fish, some girls, an egg, a man, a woman, an egg, a man, a fish, and a clock.

According to Bellos:

An algorithm, as defined for this experiment, is an ordered sequence of instructions written in a programming language for input into a computer, usually laid out as a flow chart for human understanding. Perec's commission was to turn into a text the flow-chart representing the steps that a lowly employee would take in order to obtain a pay rise. The plot itself is a pun, since the French word for a pay rise or increment (augmentation) also signifies "incrementation," the procedure used by a computer to mark its path around an algorithm. The idea was originally conceived by Jacques Perriault for the Bull computer company and then amended by Perec before he began to write out his text.

== Analysis of the works ==
Jesús Camarero described these texts as a "combinatorial drama." The bureaucracy that exists in large companies and, in particular, the difficulties that an employee has to go through to obtain a meeting with his boss and be able to ask for a salary adjustment, are not exclusive to these two works by the author. Perec also deals with this subject in the story of the Réol family in his novel Life: A User's Manual. Because of their subject matter, these texts have also been associated with the article Vuelva usted mañana, (Note: English: Come back tomorrow) written in the 19th century by Mariano José de Larra. Journalist Eric Libiot, writing for L'Express, highlights Perec's ability to raise the subject of a pay rise to the level of an act of political art:

Lorsque Perec écrit ces lignes dans une revue confidentielle, en octobre 1968, il est, depuis un an, membre de l'Oulipo, l'Ouvroir de littérature potentielle, où, notamment avec Queneau, il s'amuse à montrer que les contraintes d'écriture stimulent l'imagination. Mais, comme toujours avec l'auteur de La Vie mode d'emploi, ses jeux littéraires vont au-delà du simple exercice de style. Ils sont une façon de dire que la littérature, se fabriquant, est un acte politique autant qu'artistique. Demander une augmentation à son chef aussi. (Note: English: When Perec wrote these lines in a confidential review in October 1968, he had been a member of Oulipo (Ouvroir de littérature potentielle), for a year, where, with Queneau in particular, he had fun demonstrating that writing constraints stimulate the imagination. But, as always with the author of La Vie mode d'emploi, his literary games go beyond a simple exercise in style. They are a way of saying that literature, in the making, is as much a political act as an artistic one.)

— Eric Libiot, L'Express (20 November 2008)

According to theater critic Colette Godard, in her essay Comment fonctionne la machine? (1970), both Perec and Cuvelier said of L'ugmentation that the six actors represent the machine, but its efficiency lies in formulating, in its breakdown, all the thoughts that run through the head of a man; here, a man who is going to ask for a raise. The play can represent the duration of a life or the duration of a thought, that of a man imprisoned by a bureaucratic system, by a hierarchy, a man who knows that he can do nothing against that abstract force that denies his existence. The human element: despair or resignation, ends up ripping apart the machine.

In this sense, Cuvelier relates the confrontation with power present in these texts to the work of Franz Kafka and his mathematical games without a practical purpose, and to the work of Lewis Carroll. The hesitations that never lead to the set goal, as well as the "merciless humour," for their part, link them to the work of Anton Chekhov.

The notion of "increase," which appears in the titles of both texts, is developed in three different ways: from a financial (wage increase), rhetorical (grouping of arguments to arrive at a consequence), and mathematical (combinatorial recursion) point of view.

== Bibliography ==
- Perec, Georges (1973). "L'art et la manière d'aborder son chef de service pour lui demander une augmentation". Communication & Langages (in French). 17 (17): 41–56. doi:10.3406/colan.1973.3984.
- — (1981). Théâtre I : La Poche Parmentier precede de l'Augmentation (in French). Paris: Hachette Livre. ISBN 9782010076831.
- — (1990). Je suis né (in French). Paris: Éditions du Seuil. ISBN 9782020126540.
- — (2008). L'art et la manière d'aborder son chef de service pour lui demander une augmentation (in French). Paris: Hachette Livre. ISBN 978-2-01-237643-4.
- — (2009). El aumento. Seguido de: El arte de abordar a su jefe de servicio para pedirle un aumento (in Spanish). Translated by Moíño Sánchez, Pablo. Segovia, Spain: La uÑa RoTa. ISBN 978-8495291141.
- — (2011). The Art and Craft of Approaching Your Head of Department to Submit a Request for a Raise. Translated by Bellos, David. London: Verso Books. ISBN 978-1784786564.

=== By other authors ===
- Bellos, David (1993). Georges Perec. A Life in Words. Boston: Godine. ISBN 0879239808.
- Camarero, Jesús, ed. (September 1992). "Georges Perec: Poética narrativa y teoría literaria (selección de textos). La experimentación oulipiana" [Georges Perec: Narrative Poetics and Literary Theory (selection of texts). The Oulipian Experiment.]. Suplementos. Materiales de Trabajo Intelectual. (in Spanish) (34). Barcelona: Editorial Anthropos. ISSN 1130-2089.
- Godard, Colette (25 February 1970). "Comment fonctionne la machine?" [How does the machine work?]. Les Lettres Françaises (in French) (1323). ISSN 0024-1393.
- Nichet, Jacques (2005). ""L'Augmentation" de Georges Perec, ou le visage caché" [Georges Perec's "L'Augmentation", or the Hidden Face]. Littérature (in French). 138 (138. "Théâtre : Le retour du texte ?"): 27–33. doi:10.3406/litt.2005.1891. ISSN 0047-4800.
