= 53 Jours =

Unfinished novel by Georges Perec

53 Jours, stylised as "53 Jours" with quotation marks, is an unfinished novel by Georges Perec, published posthumously in 1989 by P.O.L and later by Gallimard. The text, published together with Perec's working notes, was edited by Harry Mathews and Jacques Roubaud. Perec brought the manuscript of the work back with him in October 1981 after returning from a stay at the University of Queensland in Brisbane.

The title and the novel are connected with The Charterhouse of Parma, the novel by Stendhal that was written in fifty-three days. (Note: Other origins of the title have also been suggested: it may refer to the number of days required to travel from Zagora to Timbuktu, or to the baptismal certificate of Perec's father, André, which bears the number 53.) The title is written in quotation marks, while 53 Days without quotation marks refers to a manuscript that plays a role in the plot. Thus, the title of Perec's novel is itself the quotation of another title. The published book contains eleven of the twenty-eight chapters planned by the author, together with notes and drafts that make it possible to reconstruct the continuation of the story in the remaining seventeen chapters. According to Perec:

It is not a book; it is stories looking at one another. It is rather as if a book were placed before a mirror, and what one sees on the other side of the mirror is its opposite. It is the reverse image.

== Contents ==
The novel concerns the disappearance of the writer Robert Serval, who has left behind an unfinished manuscript entitled La Crypte (The Crypt), a manuscript that ends with two interpretations of the mystery it presents without actually favouring either one, thereby allowing for multiple interpretations. Perec also encrypts a thirteenth word by means of 12 other words within the novel. (Note: Perec also used this principle in the Jeux intéressants column of Ça m'intéresse, which he wrote with Jacques Bens from March 1981 until his death.)

== Interpretation ==
Anne Roche notes the journalistic tone employed by Perec, which contrasts with his novel Les Choses. According to Roche, this journalistic style, describing the fictional Arab dictatorship of Grianta, is deliberately consensual and creates the impression of an unquestionable truth beyond interrogation, suggesting a form of indifference on the author's part toward what appears to be self-evident. She therefore regards the novel as a regression compared with Les Choses (which evokes Tunisia): although it seems politically engaged, it is in fact detached, and its essential meaning must be sought beyond its initial satire. Roche also observes a "deterritorialization" of the fictional dictatorship, since Perec's notes refer to France, thereby refusing to identify Grianta too readily with Morocco, Algeria, or Tunisia. This contrasts with his earlier works, which contain numerous references to the Arab world, and may reflect the author's growing distance from his earlier ambition to describe and transform the world.

In this work, as in several of his others, Georges Perec makes repeated references to the theme of collecting (there are seven occurrences related to this theme), the first three of which are nested within one another. On page 18, the reader learns that the consul is a collector; on page 48, the narrator reads a book in which one of the characters is a collector; and on page 55, within that same book being read by the narrator, there is another book in which a collector of walking sticks displays his collection. Tiphaine Samoyault sees this as a reference to Perec's novel A Gallery Portrait (Un cabinet d'amateur): the painting entitled Un cabinet d'amateur, which reflects the scene depicted in the painting infinitely within itself, becomes what she calls a textual model in "53 Days".

Georges Perec’s approach in this novel could be compared to that of Bartlebooth (who paints 500 watercolors and sends them to Gaspard Winckler, who cuts them into a jigsaw puzzle that Bartlebooth must then reassemble and return to the port where they were painted, so they can finally be submerged in a liquid that erases the ink, leaving a blank sheet of paper) in the novel Life: A User’s Manual, since Perec writes in "53 Days": "The Crypt is a detective novel, a two-part detective novel in which the second part meticulously destroys everything the first part has strived to establish."

The novel is also thought to contain new autobiographical elements. Perec refers to an episode involving the French Resistance in the Vercors maquis. This has been linked to the theory of Philippe Lejeune, who argued that autobiography imposed itself upon Perec as a "transitional phase" before receding into the background after that period.

== Author's notes ==
Georges Perec, who regularly used lists in his preparatory work, prepared anagrams of "BRISBANE", references to Stendhal, lists of Stendhal's pseudonyms, and possible sentences derived from the epigraph un R est un M qui se P le L de la R (a N is a M that Ws itself along the R), a reduction of a definition taken from a work by Stendhal. (Note: This definition of the novel appears several times in the works of Stendhal, who attributes it to Saint-Réal, a seventeenth-century author. Perec also invited his Australian students to propose variations on the definition based on its algebraic reduction: A N is a M that P's itself the L of R. One proposed variation was: A novelist is a maniac who sets himself the lemma of reality.) Perec even verified the exact origin of Stendhal's famous definition, "a novel is a mirror carried along a road (where road replaced path)". He also made projections regarding the time required to write the novel, planning to complete the manuscript in 140 days, deliver it on 3 May, and have it published on 15 June.

== Legacy ==
In 2009, Pierre Jodlowski composed the radio opera Jour 54 ("Day 54") on commission from Radio France. The work was also a finalist for the Prix Italia that same year. The radio opera was conceived from Georges Perec's notebooks.

== Published editions ==
- Georges Perec (1989). « 53 jours ». Paris: P.O.L. ISBN 2-86744-161-7.
- Georges Perec (1993). « 53 jours ». Folio. Vol. 2547. Paris: Gallimard. ISBN 2-07-038783-6
- Georges Perec (2022). « 53 jours ». L'Imaginaire. Vol. 735. Paris: Gallimard. ISBN 978-2-07-297950-7, , with a preface by Hervé Le Tellier and Michèle Audin.
