= Jacques Mercanton =

French cinematographer

- Born: 22 November 1909; Neuilly-sur-Seine, France
- Died: 27 September 1997 (aged 87); Grasse, Alpes-Maritimes, France
- Occupation: Cinematographer
- Years active: 1934-1974 (film)

Jacques Mercanton (1909–1997) was a French cinematographer.

== Selected filmography ==
- The Bread Peddler (1934)
- Zouzou (1934)
- Girls of Paris (1936)
- Gibraltar (1938)
- Ultimatum (1938)
- Personal Column (1939)
- Happy Go Lucky (1946)
- A Change in the Wind (1949)
- Jour de fête (1949)
- Voyage for Three (1950)
- Paris Vice Squad (1951)
- Alone in Paris (1951)
- Passion (1951)
- Wild Fruit (1954)
- Tides of Passion (1956)
- Girls of the Night (1958)
- Women's Prison (1958)
- Prostitution (1963)

== Bibliography ==
- David Bellos. Jacques Tati: His Life and Art. Random House, 2001.
