= Pierre Jodlowski =

French composer of mixed music (born 1971)

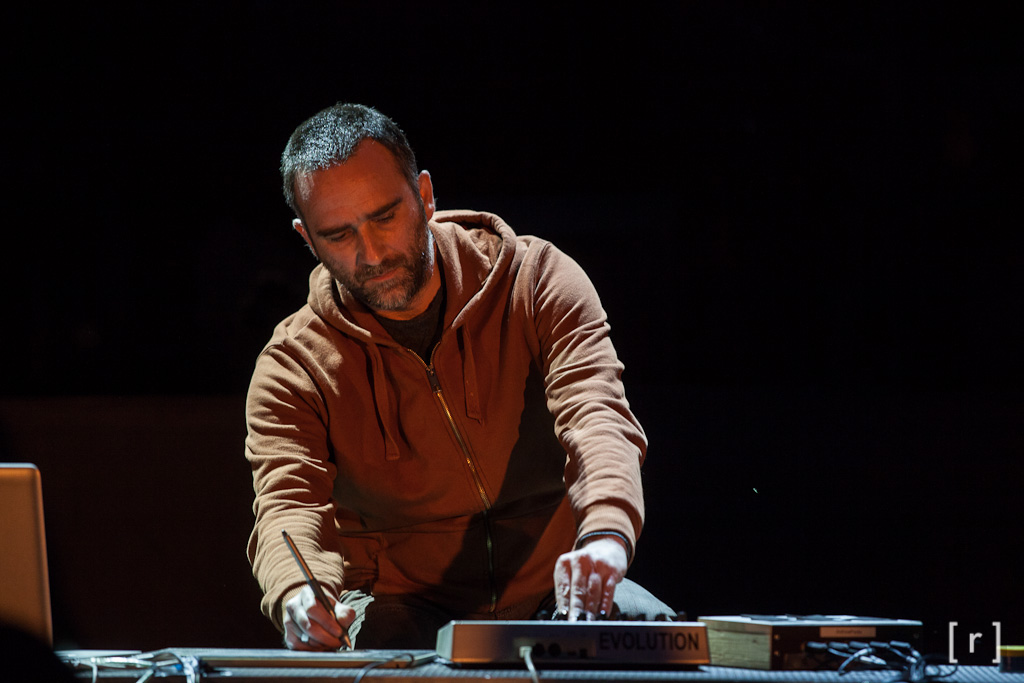
- Jodlowski in 2015
- Born: 9 March 1971 (age 55); Toulouse, France
- Education: Conservatoire de Toulouse (First Prize); University of Toulouse; University of Lyon (DEUST); Conservatoire de Lyon (DNESM); IRCAM
- Occupation: Composer
- Years active: 1990s–present
- Style: Mixed music
- Website: www.pierrejodlowski.com

Pierre Jodlowski (born 9 March 1971) is a French composer of mixed music. He works in particular on intermediality, music informatics, staging, image and interactive arts.

== Biography ==
=== Beginnings in electronic music ===
Born in Toulouse, Jodlowski began his musical studies at the Conservatoire de Toulouse, where he got a First Prize in music theory in 1991. His instrumental training included piano, saxophone and electric bass. He realized several projects in jazz and rock and achieved the course of composition in Scientific and Technical Studies (DEUST) at the University of Toulouse. He began composing in 1993 with Cinq poèmes by Jacques Dupin, an electronic piece fixed on a magnetic tape.

In 1995, he got his degree in Music and Musicology from the University of Lyon and in 1996, his Music National Diploma of Higher Studies (DNESM) in electroacoustic composition at the Conservatoire National de Lyon. He then moved on to IRCAM, where he studied composition and computer music. He completed his training by obtaining the certificate of proficiency as professor of electroacoustic composition in 1998. All the works composed by Jodlowski during this period move towards mixed music in real time, as in his piece Dialog / No Dialog (1997), with a flautist on stage accompanied by a virtual voice.

=== Mixed music and intermediality ===
After this period of study, Jodlowski continued to produce mixed music works and tried to establish multiple relationships between the instruments on stage and the sounds projected by loud speakers. He very quickly identified the question of gesture as essential in the development of his writing, and in several works he gave it an important role: De Front (1999) (Prix de Bourges / Mixed Music category), Mixtion (2002), Barbarismes (2001) and Mecano 1 (2004), a piece for percussion opposing a musician to a small automaton, a kind of metronome, an essential tool for the musician.

In the same period, the Cinémathèque de Toulouse commissioned him for an electronic creation of Eisenstein's first film, La Grève. After its creation in 2000, he presented this project on various European stages. It has become internationally well known since.

Between 2001 and 2003, he stayed in residence at the Berlin Academy of Arts and worked on a first cycle of works leading to a stage show: the three pieces were linked under the title "Berlin Random Memories" and included new media: in N, N, N (2002) for a solo dancer, he explored the possibilities of motion sensors and in Is it This?, a real time video.

Between 2004 and 2006, he composed Time and Money, a piece for percussion and electronics, for which he got the High School Prize for Composers in 2015. This creation highlights the major themes of Jodlowski's work: questioning about the world, political commitment, the question of theatricality in musical creation, how to write the gesture, integration of visual and scenic media in the process of composition. All these points were developed in an article published in the Inouï review of the Institute for Research and Acoustic Coordination / Music (IRCAM) in 2016, "The gesture, a question in composition".

=== Cycles of works and show projects ===
Since 2006, Jodlowski has been developing cycles of works, especially the Series for piano and soundtrack. After the creation of Série Noire for the Orléans Piano Competition, he composed Série Blanche, Série Bleue, Série Rose, Série Rouge... each of these works connecting visual universes (generally inspired by films) and the soloist on stage.

Another cycle was imagined between 2006 and 2008, initiating what Jodlowski calls a cumulative writing system. In these works, the principle was based on the successive and cumulative looping of all the elements played on stage. These works could be similar to American minimalism because of the use of looping, but the number of accumulated loops (more than 40 in general) generates a very strong dramatic tension characteristic of his aesthetics. Among them, Limite Circulaire, for flute, inspired by the painting of M. C. Escher and Respire, for 11 musicians and video.

He also started large-scale projects that gradually integrated all scenic mediums: lights, video, scenography. Lifetime in 2007 which includes Time and Money, Labyrinthe, People Time; collaborations with dance (the Narcisse cycle with the Lamaison Company), collaborations with the new circus (Les Beaux Orages with the Petit Travers Company in 2011).

He tried the radio art genre with Jour 54, a work inspired by Georges Perec's unfinished novel: 53 jours. This work gave rise to a stage version presented in France and Canada with a video directed by scenographer Pierre Nouvel.

In 2011, he created his first musical drama: L'Aire du Dire, a one-hour oratorio about the issue of speech, featuring 12 singers who either use spoken voice or sung voice.

=== Presence and use of voice ===
Jodlowski integrated voice in his very first works. Initially, it is often a distilled presence in the electronic parts; he often uses cinematographic voice-overs. After L' Aire du Dire, his first truly vocal work, he composed Ombra della Mente, for soprano, bass clarinet and electronic, based on Alda Merini's poetry.

Then came Soleil Noir, a long composition for soprano, ensemble and electronic on the theme of the First World War and where spoken and sung vocal parts alternate, especially in the extracts devoted to Shakespeare's Henry V. In 2017, he created La Ralentie, a scenic work on the eponymous text by Henri Michaux.

Even in his purely instrumental works, voice remains present, as in Diary Random and Pickles, composed in 2016 where musicians must speak up excerpts from newspapers; or in his show Ghostland, commissioned by the Percussions de Strasbourg in 2017 and where a recorded voice sings the texts of great German romanticists.

=== Interactive sound installations ===
Jodlowski is also interested in the question of interactivity, spectators take an active part in some of his works: with some gestures (spotted by sensors), they may control the evolution of sound and visual elements. Its first installation, Mendel (2005), exploited different types of sensors and technologies in a futuristic environment. GrainStick 2.0 (2010) is a work inspired by video games. Soleil blanc (2016), an interactive audiovisual installation provides a scenery which attracts the visitor inside a First World War barracks and places him at the center of an interactive process.

Since 2009, Jodlowski has been working more particularly on one of his installations: Passage. In this project, consisting of an interactive, 10-meter-long tunnel, the visitor is confronted to the memory of another individual which he can then explore by moving as he pleases in this space.

The question of memory, central in Jodlowski's aesthetics is declined in the various versions of this installation, each of them being devoted to a particular theme: intimacy, ecology, time, city portraits, refugees' memories...

=== Societal and political commitment ===
At the end of his studies, Jodlowski gathered a group of composers in his hometown Toulouse and created the Novelum Festival. For 17 years, he has co-directed with Bertrand Dubedout and developed a program that reflected his interests as regards stage performance. Éole Studio, located in Odyssud Cultural Center in Blagnac, hosts the productions of this group of artists and ensures the development of projects at national and international levels.

Jodlowski has always claimed a political commitment in his works. He tackles societal issues as in Time and Money, with a deep humanistic thought. In Ultimatum, for a string orchestra and recorded voice, a young teenager chants with great violence Fernando Pessoa's famous Ultimatum, a critical manifesto against men of power. During lectures or master classes, Jodlowski insists on the societal role of the composer who can no longer, according to him, stay away from the world but must commit himself in order to preserve a free and experimental expression of contemporary musical art.

== Works ==
- Cinq Poèmes de Jacques Dupin, 1993
- Éclats de ciel, 1995
- Vola, 1995
- L'Envers du décor, 1995
- IRMA, 1995
- Mise en bouche acousmatique, 1996
- Lignes d'incidences, 1996
- Focales, 1997
- Dialog/No Dialog, 1997
- À John, Chorus III, 1998
- De front, 1999
- Tryptique à la nuit, 2000
- Mendel, 2000
- La grève, 2000
- Forfaiture, 2000
- Figures pour un espace en mouvement, 2000
- Mental Vortex, 2001
- Is it is ?, 2001
- Barbarismes, Trilogie de l'an mil, 2001
- N, N, N, 2002
- Mixtion, 2002
- People/Time, 2003
- Géo-métries, 2003
- Chorus 1A, 2003
- Berlin, mémoires aléatoires, 2003
- Mecano 1, 2004
- In [et] Out 1, 2004
- Série noire, 2005
- Lifetime, 2005
- Labyrinthe, 2005
- Time and Money, 2006
- Le grand dehors, 2006
- Artaud Corpus fragments, 2006
- 60 Loops, 2006
- Wind, 2007
- Série blanche, 2007
- Drones, 2007
- Cycle des rituels, 2007
- Criogenesis, 2007
- Collapsed, 2007
- 24 Loops, 2007
- Respire, 2008
- Limite Circulaire, 2008
- Coliseum, 2008
- Suite 54, 2009
- Passage, 2009
- Narcisse – O, 2009
- Jour 54, 2009
- Le royaume d'en bas, 2010
- GrainStick 2.0, 2010
- Ghost woman, 2010
- Typologies du regard, 2011
- Série-C, 2011
- L'aire du dire, 2011
- Série rose, 2012
- Something out of Apocalypse, 2012
- Hyperspeed disconnected motions, 2012
- Série bleue, 2013
- Ombre della Mente, 2013
- Le dernier songe de Samuel Beckett, 2013
- Post Human Computation, 2014
- Induction, 2014
- Twins Peak, 2015
- Soleil noir, 2015
- Lesson of Anatomy n°1, 2015
- Ultimatum, 2016
- This leads to an emotional stasis, 2016
- Tadmor, 2016
- Soleil blanc, 2016
