= Thérèse Quentin =

French actress

- Born: 5 July 1929; Ixelles, Belgium
- Died: 20 February 2015 (aged 85); Paris, France
- Occupation: Actress
- Years active: 1954–2015

Thérèse Quentin (5 July 1929 – 20 February 2015) was a French actress. She was married to the actor and stage director Marcel Cuvelier (1924–2015), with whom she had a daughter, actress Marie Cuvelier.

== Filmography ==
- Les Aventuriers (1967, directed by Robert Enrico) as the aunt, Madame Dubreuil
- Le Grand Meaulnes (1967, directed by Jean-Gabriel Albicocco) as Madame Seurel
- L'Enlèvement (1973, TV Movie, directed by Jean L'Hôte) as Madame Corbier
- Voyage en Grande Tartarie (1974, directed by Jean-Charles Tacchella), as a friend at the funeral
- Madame Bovary (1974, TV Movie, by Pierre Cardinal) as Madame Homais
- Les Rosenberg ne doivent pas mourir (1975, TV Movie, directed by Stellio Lorenzi) as Madame Harris
- Je suis Pierre Rivière (1976, directed by Christine Lipinska) as the mother
- Commissaire Moulin (1976, TV Series) as La femme de Pinocchio
- Hôtel Baltimore (1976, TV Movie, directed by Alexandre Arcady) as Madame Oxenham
- Diabolo menthe (1977, directed by Diane Kurys) as Mademoiselle Dumas
- Cinéma 16 (1977-1978, TV Series) as La directrice du lycée / La bouchère, la patronne du café, l'employée de l'ANPE, la suiveuse
- Les Dossiers de l'écran (1978, TV Series, directed by Alexandre Astruc) as the cook
- Il y a longtemps que je t'aime (1979, directed by Jean Charles Tacchella) as Marie-Jeanne, the wife of Christian
- La Dérobade (1979, directed by Daniel Duval)
- Les 400 coups de Virginie (1979-1980, TV Mini-Series, directed by Bernard Queysanne) as Mme Lecran
- Nous te mari-e-rons (1981, TV Movie, directed by Jacques Fansten) as Gisèle
- Les Amours des années grises (1982, TV Series, directed by Marlène Bertin and Stéphane Bertin) as Madame d'Aunay
- Les Amours des années grises (1982, TV Series, directed by Marion Sarraut) as Madame d'Aunay
- La Tendresse (1982, TV Movie, directed by Bernard Queysanne) as Thérèse
- Sans un mot (1982, TV Movie, directed by Gérard Poitou-Weber) as the mayor's wife
- Après tout ce qu'on a fait pour toi (1982, TV Movie, directed by Jacques Fansten)
- Les Enquêtes du commissaire Maigret (1984–1985, TV Series) as Madame Pardon
- Espionne et tais-toi (1986, TV Series, directed by Claude Boissol) as Helena Mechanik
- Le Squale (1991, TV Series, directed by Claude Boissol) as Séverine's mother
- Halal police d'État (2011, directed by Rachid Dhibou) as Mme Granger
- My Little Princess (2011, directed by Eva Ionesco) as Vieille dame église
- The Chef (2012, directed by Daniel Cohen) as Résidente
- In the Shadow of Women (2015, directed by Philippe Garrel) as Henri's wife

== Theatre ==
- 1965: Archiflore by Jeannine Worms, directed by Nicolas Bataille, Grand Guignol
- 1968: La Leçon by Eugène Ionesco, directed by Jacques Mauclair, Carcassonne Festival, Collioure Festival, Théâtre du Midi
- 1969: Exit the King by Eugène Ionesco, directed by Jacques Mauclair, Bellac Festival
- 1970: Exit the King by Eugène Ionesco, directed by Jacques Mauclair, Théâtre de l'Athénée
- 1977: Iphigénie-Hôtel by Michel Vinaver, directed by Antoine Vitez, Théâtre des Quartiers d’Ivry
- 1980: Pour l'amour de l'humanité by Marcel Cuvelier, directed by Jean-Christian Grinevald and Marcel Cuvelier, Théâtre Marie Stuart
- 1982: Spectacle Ionesco by Eugène Ionesco, directed by Roger Planchon, TNP Villeurbanne, Théâtre de l'Odéon in 1984
- 1986: Rhapsodie-Béton by Georges Michel, directed by Marcel Cuvelier, Théâtre de la Huchette
- 1990: Comme tu me veux by Luigi Pirandello, directed by Maurice Attias, Théâtre de la Madeleine
- 1996: Théâtre en miettes by Eugène Ionesco, directed by Marcel Cuvelier, Théâtre de la Huchette
- 1999: Le Domaine des femmes by Anton Chekhov, directed by Marcel Cuvelier, Théâtre de la Huchette
- 2002: Histoires de On by Jean-Claude Grumberg, directed by Marcel Cuvelier, Théâtre de la Huchette
- Le Point de vue d'Emmy by David Hare, directed by Bernard Murat, Tournée
- Je ne me souviens plus de rien by Arthur Miller, Théâtre du Tourtour
- Lillian, Théâtre du Tourtour
- Le Belvédère by Ödön von Horváth, directed by A. Alexis, Théâtre de Gennevilliers
- Douce Nuit by H. Huller, directed by Alexis Barsacq
- Vinci avait raison by Roland Topor
- Equus, Théâtre de l'Athénée
- Hotel Baltimore, directed by Alexandre Arcady, Espace Cardin
- L'Augmentation by Georges Perec, Théâtre de la Gaîté
- Demain une fenêtre sur rue by Jean-Claude Grumberg
- Premier Avertissement by August Strindberg, Théâtre des Champs-Élysées
- Oblomov by Ivan Goncharov, directed by Marcel Cuvelier, Théâtre des Champs-Élysées
- L'Homme du destin by George Bernard Shaw, Théâtre de l'Alliance française
- La Grande Catherine by George Bernard Shaw, Théâtre de l'Alliance française
- Scabreuse Aventure by Dostoievski, Théâtre du Vieux-Colombier
- La Buanderie, Théâtre de la Huchette
- The Bald Soprano and La Leçon by Eugène Ionesco, Théâtre de la Huchette
- La Lettre perdue by Courgiale, Théâtre de Poche
- Le Jeu de l'amour et de la mort by Rollaud, Théâtre de Poche
