= Which Moped with Chrome-plated Handlebars at the Back of the Yard? =

Book by Georges Perec

- Author: Georges Perec
- Original title: Quel petit vélo à guidon chromé au fond de la cour?
- Translator: Ian Monk
- Language: French
- Publisher: Les Lettres Nouvelles
- Publication date: 1966
- Publication place: France
- Preceded by: Things: A Story of the Sixties
- Followed by: A Man Asleep

Which Moped with Chrome-plated Handlebars at the Back of the Yard? is a comic novella by Georges Perec. Perec's second published work, it was originally published in 1966 in French as Quel petit vélo à guidon chromé au fond de la cour? The English translation by Ian Monk was published in Three by Perec by David R. Godine, Publisher in 2004. The Review of Contemporary Fiction called Monk's translation "gorgeous and eloquent".

The book is the story of the efforts of a French Sergeant, Henri Pollak, and his friends to rescue a fellow soldier from being sent overseas to fight in the Algerian War of Independence. It is written in a rambunctiously comic style, with an exaggerated use of rhetorical devices and a mix of registers, a style inspired by Raymond Queneau and popularized in Zazie in the Metro, and by rhetoric lessons Perec was taking from Roland Barthes. Common rules of grammar and spelling are frequently broken, and even basic conventions such as the consistency of character's names are flouted for humorous effect. The book includes an index of "ornamentations and flowers of rhetoric" used in the text, from abstract (pg 20) to psittacism ("assuredly"), and including anadiplosis, epistrophe, and metalepsis. Many of the characters and scenes, including the moped-riding protagonist, were based on real-life friends of Perec.

Which Moped... was published shortly after Perec received the Renaudot Prize for his debut novel Things, but it did not meet with the same widespread critical success. Its farcical tone was in contrast to the controlled classical writing and criticism of consumer society found in Things, and it received little notice in the press, although the few reviews that were published (by Les Echos and Le Figaro, among others) were favorable.

Perec dedicated the book to "Lg", an abbreviation for La Ligne générale (after The General Line, a film by Sergei Eisenstein), a group of French literary intellectuals who provided Perec with his first family of friends and second education, and of which Perec was a leading member prior to his involvement in Oulipo.
