= Georges Schéhadé =

Lebanese playwright and poet

- جورج شحادة
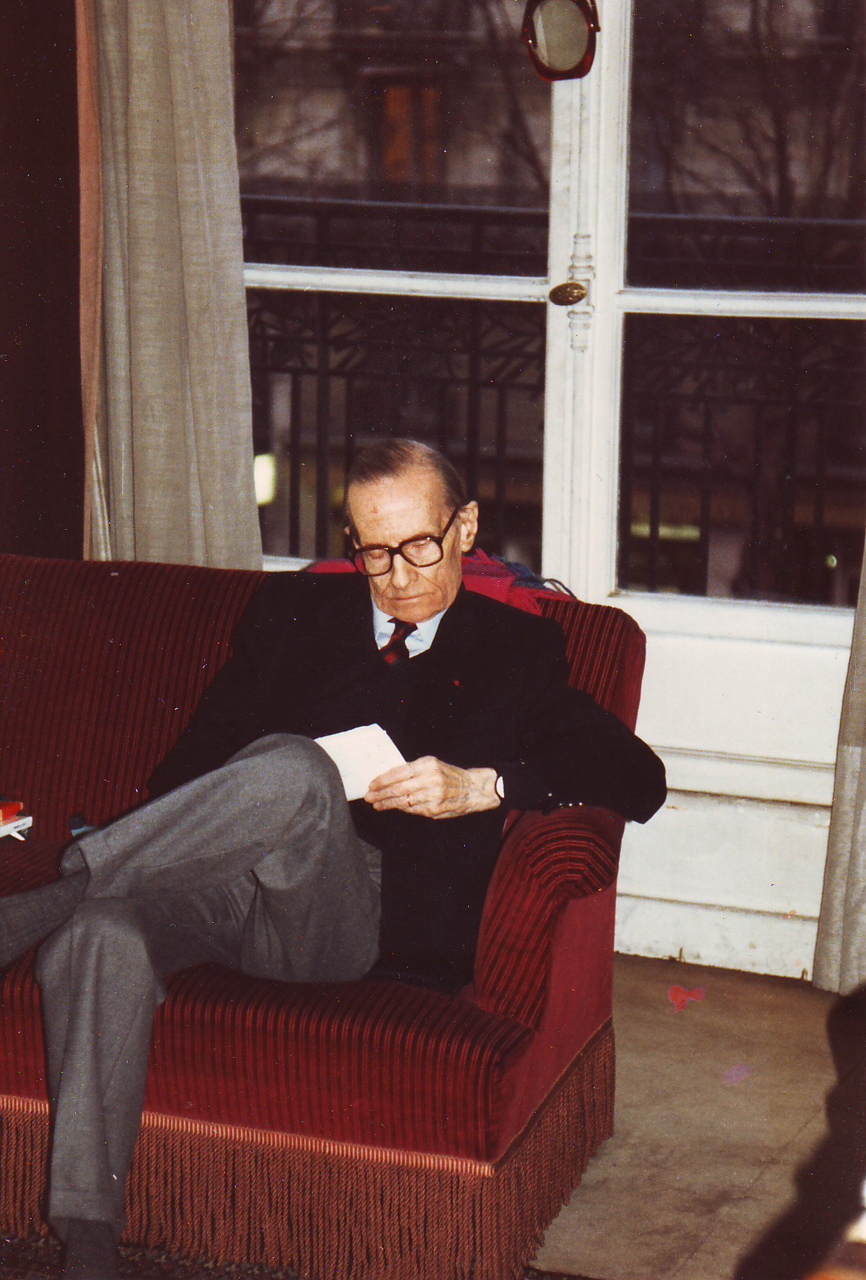
- Georges Schehadé in Paris, 1987
- Born: 1905; Alexandria, Egypt
- Died: 1989 (aged 83–84); Paris, France
- Burial place: Montparnasse Cemetery
- Occupations: Poet, writer, screenwriter
- Awards: Grand prix de la francophonie (1986)

Georges Schehadé (Arabic: جورج شحادة; 2 November 1905 – 17 January 1989) was a Lebanese playwright and poet writing in French.

== Life and career ==
Georges Schehadé was born in Alexandria, Egypt, into an aristocratic Lebanese Greek Orthodox family. He spent most of his life in Beirut, Lebanon. His sister was the novelist, Laurice Schehadé. He studied law at the American University of Beirut and became a general secretary at the Ecole Supérieure de Lettres in 1945.

In 1930, Saint-John Perse published Schehadé's first poems in the literary magazine Commerce. During his first travel to Europe in 1933 he met Max Jacob and Jules Supervielle. After World War II, he frequently stayed in Paris where he sympathized with the Surrealists, especially with André Breton and Benjamin Péret.

Between 1938 and 1951, Georges Schehadé wrote four small books of poetry that Gallimard published in 1952 under the title Les Poésies.

The year before Georges Vitaly produced Schehadé's first play, Monsieur Bob'le, at the Théâtre de la Huchette, and it got very controversial reviews. Most critics didn't like it at all but several poets and actors – amongst them André Breton, René Char, Georges Limbour, Benjamin Péret, Henri Pichette and Gérard Philipe – were very fond of it and wrote a couple of articles in Le Figaro Littéraire.

In 1954, Jean-Louis Barrault produced his second play, La Soirée des proverbes, that hadn't any success either. Only in 1956, with his third play, Histoire de Vasco (world premièred at Schauspielhaus Zürich), Schehadé wrote a work that was staged all over the world and translated into more than 25 languages. In 1974, the British composer Gordon Crosse (translation and libretto by Ted Hughes) made an opera out of this play: The Story of Vasco, premièred by Sadler's Wells Opera at the Coliseum Theatre in London.

From 1960 to 1965, Schehadé wrote three other plays, Les Violettes (1960), Le Voyage (1961) and L'Emigré de Brisbane (1965) that entered the repertoire of the Comédie-Française in 1967. It was his last play.

In 1985, after a long period of silence, Georges Schehadé published his last book of poetry, Le Nageur d'un seul amour, a collection of poems he had written between the late 1960s and the early 1980s.

== Death ==
He died on 17 January 1989 in Paris and was buried in the Cimetière du Montparnasse. His wife Brigitte died in 1998.

Georges Schehadé was mentioned to have influenced Nassim Nicholas Taleb in Taleb's youth, mentioned the postface of The Bed of Procrustes.

== Works ==
=== Poetry ===
- Étincelles, Edition de la Pensée latine, Paris 1928
- Poésies I, GLM, Paris 1938
- Poésies II, GLM, Paris 1948
- Poésies III, GLM, Paris 1949
- Poésies Zéro ou L'Écolier Sultan (written in 1928/29), GLM, Paris 1950
- Si tu rencontres un ramier (later called Poésies IV), GLM, Paris 1951
- Les Poésies (Poésie I–IV), Gallimard, Paris 1952, reprinted in paperback edition Poésie/Gallimard 1969, 2001 and 2009
- Poésies V (1972)
- Le Nageur d'un seul amour (= Poésies VI), Gallimard, Paris 1985
- Poésies VII (last poems), Editions Dar An-Nahar, Beyrouth 1998

=== Plays ===
- Monsieur Bob'le, Gallimard, Paris 1951
- La Soirée des proverbes, Gallimard, Paris 1954
- Histoire de Vasco, Gallimard, Paris 1956
- Les Violettes, Gallimard, Paris 1960
- Le Voyage, Gallimard, Paris 1961
- L'Émigré de Brisbane, Gallimard, Paris 1965
- L'Habit fait le prince (written in 1957), pantomime, Gallimard, Paris 1973

=== Other works ===
- Rodogune Sinne ("novel", published in 1942, 1947; written in 1929)
- Goha (screenplay), 1958
- Anthologie du vers unique, Ramsay, Paris 1977
