= Georges Vitaly =

French actor, theater director and theater manager

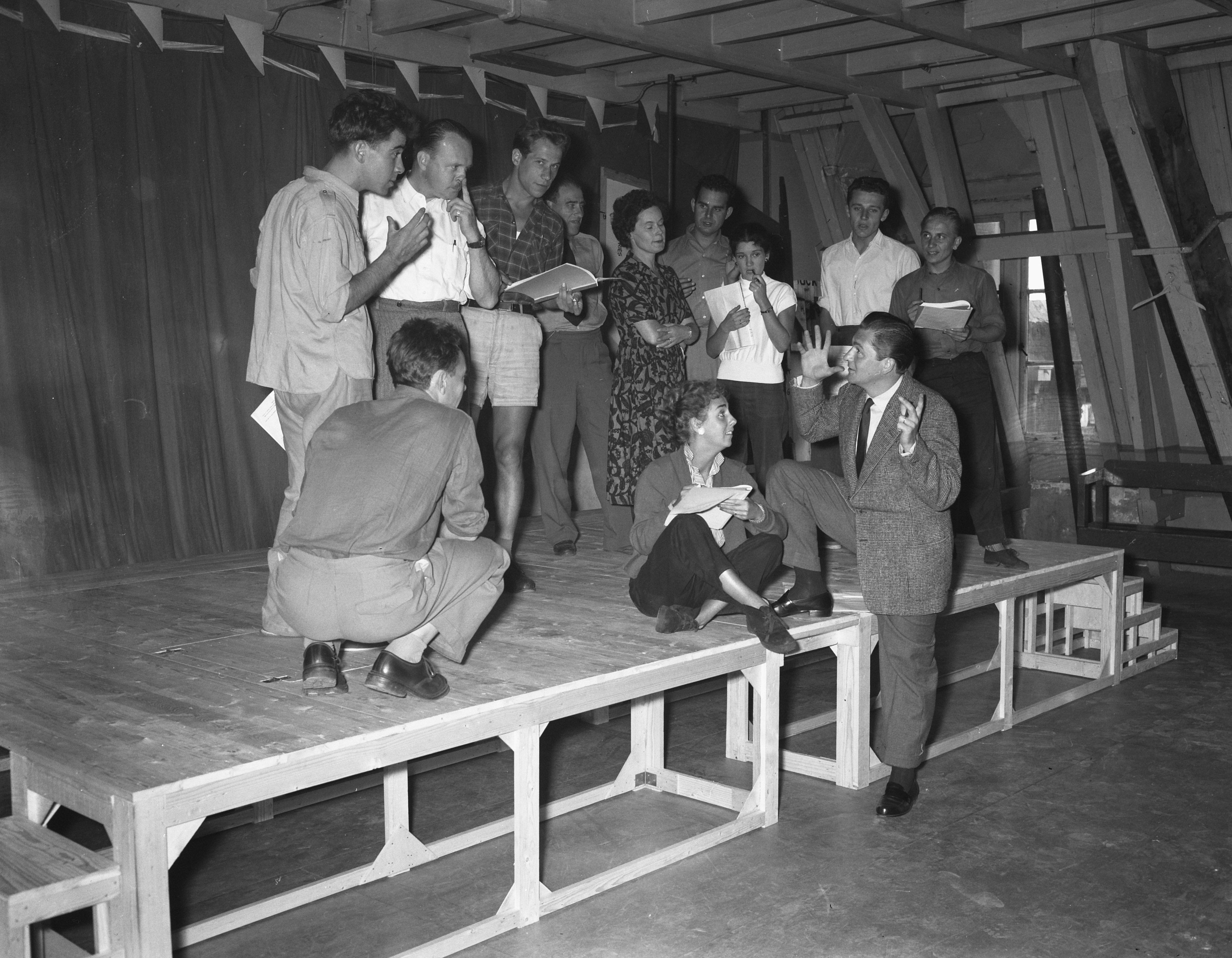
- Vitaly (1955)
- Born: Vitali Garcouchenko; 15 January 1917; Simferopol
- Died: 2 January 2007 (aged 89); Paris
- Occupation(s): Theater director, theater manager, actor.

Georges Vitaly, real name Vitali Garcouchenko, (15 January 1917 – 2 January 2007), was a 20th-century French actor, theater director and theater manager.

The son of immigrants from the Russian Revolution, he trained as actor from 1934. In 1947, he won the concours des jeunes compagnies with Le Mal court by Jacques Audiberti with Suzanne Flon. In 1947 he founded the Théâtre de la Huchette which he directed until 1952. Then, from 1954 to 1970, he was director of the Théâtre La Bruyère, in Paris. From 1970 to 1975, he was director of the Maison de la culture in Nantes.

He was married to the comedian Monique Delaroche.

== Filmography ==
=== Cinema ===
- 1959: Double Agents by Robert Hossein
- 1960: Les Canailles by Maurice Labro
- 1964: L'Enfer by Henri-Georges Clouzot (unfinished)

=== Television ===
- 1970: La Hobereaute (spoken opera by Jacques Audiberti), directed by Georges Vitaly, en différé de l'Hôtel de Sully dans le cadre du Festival du Marais, TV director Philippe Laïk
- 1970: The Moods of Marianne by Alfred de Musset
- 1981: Le Petit Théâtre d'Antenne 2 : Un dirigeable ensorcelé by André Halimi, TV direction

=== Au théâtre ce soir ===
Director

- 1970 : Cherchez le corps, Mister Blake by Frank Launder, Sidney Gilliat, TV director Pierre Sabbagh, Théâtre Marigny
- 1976 : La Sainte Famille by André Roussin, TV director Pierre Sabbagh, Théâtre Édouard VII
- 1976 : Le monsieur qui attend by Emlyn Williams, TV director Pierre Sabbagh, Théâtre Édouard VII
- 1977 : Appelez-moi maître by Renée and Gabriel Arout, TV director Pierre Sabbagh, Théâtre Marigny
- 1978 : Une femme trop honnête by Armand Salacrou, TV director Pierre Sabbagh, théâtre Marigny
- 1979 : Good Bye Charlie by George Axelrod, adaptation Pierre Barillet and Jean-Pierre Gredy, réalisation Pierre Sabbagh, Théâtre Marigny
- 1980 : La Claque by André Roussin, TV director Pierre Sabbagh, Théâtre Marigny
- 1981 : La Quadrature du cercle by Valentin Kataev, TV director Pierre Sabbagh, Théâtre Marigny
- 1984 : Un parfum de miel by Éric Westphal, TV director Pierre Sabbagh, Théâtre Marigny
- 1984 : Pomme, pomme, pomme by Jacques Audiberti, TV director Pierre Sabbagh, Théâtre Marigny

== Theatre ==
=== Comedian ===
- 1944: Hyménée by Nikolai Gogol, directed by Pierre Valde, Théâtre du Vieux-Colombier
- 1945: Caligula by Albert Camus, directed by Paul Œttly, Théâtre Hébertot
- 1947: Le Mal court by Jacques Audiberti, directed by Georges Vitaly, Théâtre Charles de Rochefort, Théâtre de Poche Montparnasse
- 1947: Les Amants de Noël by Pierre Barillet, directed by Pierre Valde, théâtre de Poche
- 1948: La Fête noire by Jacques Audiberti, directed by Georges Vitaly, Théâtre de la Huchette
- 1949: La Quadrature du cercle by Valentin Kataev, directed by Georges Vitaly, Théâtre de la Huchette
- 1951: Monsieur Bob'le by Georges Schehadé, directed by Georges Vitaly, Théâtre de la Huchette
- 1960: L'Homme à l'ombrelle blanche by Charles Charras, directed by Georges Vitaly, Poche Montparnasse

=== Theatre director ===
- 1945: La Cinquantaine by Georges Courteline, L’Anniversaire de la fondation and La Noce by Anton Chekhov, Théâtre de Poche
- 1946: Les Pères ennemis by Charles Vildrac, Théâtre Édouard VII
- 1947: Le Mal court by Jacques Audiberti, Théâtre Charles de Rochefort, Théâtre de Poche, Comédie des Champs-Élysées, Théâtre des Noctambules
- 1947: Les Épiphanies by Henri Pichette, Théâtre des Noctambules
- 1948: Le Sang clos by René Maurice Picard, Théâtre de la Huchette
- 1948: La Fête noire by Jacques Audiberti, Théâtre de la Huchette
- 1949: Les Indifférents by Odilon-Jean Périer, Théâtre de la Huchette
- 1949: Les Taureaux by Alexandre Arnoux, Théâtre de la Huchette
- 1949: La Quadrature du cercle by Valentin Kataev, Théâtre de la Huchette
- 1950: Pépita by Henri Fontenille and Maurice Chevit, Théâtre de la Huchette
- 1950: Pucelle by Jacques Audiberti, Théâtre de la Huchette
- 1951: La Belle Rombière by Jean Clervers & Guillaume Hanoteau, Théâtre de la Huchette, Théâtre de l'Œuvre
- 1951: Edmée by Pierre-Aristide Bréal, Théâtre de la Huchette
- 1951: Monsieur Bob'le by Georges Schehadé, Théâtre de la Huchette
- 1952: Médée by Robinson Jeffers, Théâtre Montparnasse
- 1952: Les Taureaux by Alexandre Arnoux, Théâtre Montparnasse
- 1952: La Petite Femme de Loth by Tristan Bernard, Théâtre Montparnasse
- 1952: A Flea in Her Ear by Georges Feydeau, Théâtre Montparnasse
- 1952: La Farce des ténébreux by Michel de Ghelderode, Théâtre du Grand-Guignol
- 1952: Les Barbes nobles by André Roussin, Théâtre du Grand-Guignol
- 1953: La Délaissée by Max Maurey,
- 1953: Crime parfait by Frederick Knott, Théâtre des Ambassadeurs
- 1953: Du plomb pour ces demoiselles by Frédéric Dard, Théâtre du Grand-Guignol
- 1953: L'Énigme de la chauve-souris by Mary Roberts Rinehart, Théâtre du Grand-Guignol
- 1953: Les Naturels du Bordelais by Jacques Audiberti, Théâtre La Bruyère
- 1953: La Danseuse et le comédien by Claude Schnerb, Théâtre La Bruyère
- 1954: A Flea in Her Ear by Georges Feydeau, Théâtre des Célestins
- 1954: Crime parfait by Frederick Knott, Théâtre de l'Ambigu
- 1954: Les Mystères de Paris by Albert Vidalie after Eugène Sue, Théâtre La Bruyère
- 1954: Si jamais je te pince !... by Eugène Labiche, Théâtre La Bruyère
- 1955: Lady 213 by Jean Guitton, Théâtre de la Madeleine
- 1955: Doit-on le dire ? by Eugène Labiche, Théâtre La Bruyère
- 1955: Un cas intéressant by Dino Buzzati, adaptation Albert Camus, Théâtre La Bruyère
- 1955: Monsieur et Mesdames Kluck by Germaine Lefrancq, Théâtre La Bruyère
- 1955: Le Mal court by Jacques Audiberti, Théâtre La Bruyère
- 1955: Ce diable d'ange by Pierre Destailles and Charles Michel, Comédie-Wagram
- 1956: Le Prince endormi by Terence Rattigan, Théâtre de la Madeleine
- 1957: Une femme trop honnête by Armand Salacrou, Théâtre Édouard VII
- 1957: La Petite Femme de Loth by Tristan Bernard, Théâtre La Bruyère
- 1957: Hibernatus by Jean Bernard-Luc, Théâtre de l'Athénée
- 1957: The Taming of the Shrew by William Shakespeare, Théâtre de l'Athénée
- 1957: La terre est basse by Alfred Adam, Théâtre La Bruyère
- 1957: Les Taureaux by Alexandre Arnoux, Théâtre La Bruyère
- 1958: Le Ouallou by Jacques Audiberti, Théâtre La Bruyère
- 1958: Le Chinois by Pierre Barillet and Jean-Pierre Gredy, Théâtre La Bruyère
- 1958: Don Juan by Henry de Montherlant, Théâtre de l'Athénée
- 1958: Le Système Ribadier by Georges Feydeau, Théâtre La Bruyère
- 1958: Le Serment d'Horace by Henry Murger, Théâtre La Bruyère
- 1958: La Petite Femme de Loth by Tristan Bernard, Théâtre La Bruyère
- 1959: L'Effet Glapion by Jacques Audiberti, Théâtre La Bruyère
- 1959: Edmée by Pierre-Aristide Bréal, Théâtre La Bruyère
- 1960: Le Mariage de Monsieur Mississippi by Friedrich Dürrenmatt, Théâtre La Bruyère
- 1960: L'Homme à l'ombrelle blanche by Charles Charras, Poche Montparnasse
- 1961: Monsieur chasse ! by Georges Feydeau, Théâtre La Bruyère
- 1961: Le Rêveur by Jean Vauthier, Théâtre La Bruyère
- 1962: Frank V by Friedrich Dürrenmatt, Théâtre national de Belgique
- 1962: Irma la douce by Alexandre Breffort and Marguerite Monnot
- 1962: Catharsis de Michel Parent, Festival des nuits de Bourgogne Dijon
- 1962: Pomme, pomme, pomme by Jacques Audiberti, Théâtre La Bruyère
- 1962: La Queue du diable by Yves Jamiaque, Théâtre La Bruyère
- 1962: Cherchez le corps, Mister Blake by Frank Launder and Sidney Gilliat, Théâtre La Bruyère
- 1963: Les Passions contraires by Georges Soria, Théâtre La Bruyère
- 1963: Le Mal court by Jacques Audiberti, Théâtre La Bruyère
- 1963: Les Rustres by Carlo Goldoni, Pays-Bas
- 1964: 2+2=2 by Staf Knop, Théâtre La Bruyère
- 1964: Marie Stuart by Friedrich von Schiller, Festival des nuits de Bourgogne
- 1965: El Greco by Luc Vilsen, Théâtre du Vieux-Colombier
- 1966: Le Mal court by Jacques Audiberti, Tréteaux de France
- 1966: Eris de Lee Falk, Théâtre La Bruyère
- 1966: Le Grand Cérémonial by Fernando Arrabal, Théâtre des Mathurins
- 1966: Mêlées et démêlées by Eugène Ionesco, Théâtre La Bruyère
- 1966: La Fête noire by Jacques Audiberti, Festival du Marais Hôtel de Sully, Théâtre La Bruyère
- 1967: Un parfum de fleurs by James Saunders, Théâtre La Bruyère
- 1967: Les Caprices de Marianne by Alfred de Musset, Festival des Nuits de Bourgogne, Festival du Languedoc
- 1968: Quoat-Quoat by Jacques Audiberti, Théâtre La Bruyère
- 1968: Le Mal court by Jacques Audiberti, Tréteaux de France, tournée au Moyen-orient Égypte, Liban, Turquie)
- 1969: Guerre et paix au café Sneffle by Rémo Forlani, Théâtre La Bruyère
- 1969: La Fête noire by Jacques Audiberti, Théâtre La Bruyère
- 1969: la Hobereaute by Jacques Audiberti, Hôtel de Sully
- 1970: Des pommes pour Ève by Gabriel Arout, Théâtre La Bruyère
- 1970: Caligula by Albert Camus, Théâtre La Bruyère, Théâtre Graslin
- 1970: The Resistible Rise of Arturo Ui by Bertolt Brecht, Maison de la Culture de Nantes
- 1971: La Logeuse by Jacques Audiberti, Théâtre La Bruyère
- 1971: Vézelay la colline éternelle son et lumière, text Maurice Druon
- 1972: L'Ingénu d'Auteuil by Jean Le Marois, Théâtre La Bruyère
- 1972: The Brothers Karamazov by Fyodor Dostoyevsky, Théâtre Graslin
- 1973: Série blême by Boris Vian, Théâtre de Boulogne-Billancourt
- 1973: Le Dernier des métiers by Boris Vian, Maison de la Culture de Nantes
- 1974: Le Barbier de Séville by Beaumarchais, Maison de la Culture de Nantes
- 1975: Deux sur la Tamise by Sophie Darbon, Théâtre La Bruyère
- 1978: Punk et Punk et Colégram by Fernando Arrabal, Théâtre du Lucernaire
- 1979: La Baignoire by Victor Haïm, Théâtre du Lucernaire
- 1979: Série blême by Boris Vian, Théâtre du Lucernaire
- 1980 : Pétrolimonade de Max Naldini, Théâtre Beaubourg
- 1980: Juin 40 by Pierre Bourgeade, Théâtre du Lucernaire
- 1981: Le Merveilleux Complet couleur glace à la noix de coco by Ray Bradbury, Chateauvallon
- 1981: Faut pas faire cela tout seul, David Mathel de Serge Ganzl, Théâtre du Lucernaire
- 1981: Le Roi des balcons by Jean-Jacques Varoujean, Théâtre du Coupe-Chou Beaubourg
- 1982: Un parfum de miel by Eric Westphal, Théâtre du Lucernaire
- 1982: Le Mal court by Jacques Audiberti, Théâtre du Tourtour
- 1984: Ubu enchaîné by Alfred Jarry, Théâtre du Lucernaire
- 1985: La Fête noire by Jacques Audiberti, Théâtre du Lucernaire
- 1986: Le Mal court by Jacques Audiberti, Théâtre Mouffetard
- 1989: Flüchtlingsgespräche by Bertolt Brecht, Théâtre du Lucernaire
- 1989: Le Dépôt des locomotives by Michel Diaz, Théâtre Mouffetard
- 1991: Les Patients by Jacques Audiberti, Petit Montparnasse
- 1991: Amours et jalousies by Molière, maison Armande Béjart Meudon
- 1995: La Société des Alloqués by Guy Foissy, Théâtre du Lucernaire

== Prizes and honours ==
- 2002 : Prix du Brigadier : Brigadier d'honneur for all of his career.

== Biography ==
- Maquillage de théâtre de Georges Vitaly, 1947
- En toute vitalyté : 50 ans de théâtre de Georges Vitaly, Éditions Nizet, 1995
- Le Fabuleux Roman du théâtre de la Huchette de Gonzague Phélip, Gallimard, 2007
- Malva, Éditions Alna, 2005.
