= Pichette =

Pichette is a surname of French origin. People with that name include:

- Dave Pichette (born 1960), Canadian ice hockey player
- Henri Pichette (1924–2000), French writer and poet
- J. Roger Pichette (1921–2002), Canadian politician
- Jean-François Pichette (born 1962), Canadian Francophone actor from Quebec
- Patrick Pichette (born before 1987), Canadian business executive, formerly with Google Inc
- Pierre Pichette (born 1954), Canadian ice sledge hockey player who competed in the 1994, 1998 and 2002 Winter Paralympics

== See also ==
- fr:Pichette, a disambiguation page in French Wikipedia
