= Georges Perec: A Life in Words =

1993 biography of Georges Perec by David Bellos

- Author: David Bellos
- Language: English
- Subject: Georges Perec
- Genre: Biography
- Publisher: David R. Godine, Publisher
- Publication date: 1993
- Publication place: United States

Georges Perec: A Life in Words is a biography of Georges Perec by David Bellos, Professor of French and Comparative Literature and Director of the Program in Translation and Intercultural Communication at Princeton University, who also translated Perec's major novel Life: A User's Manual (1978) from French into English. His prize-winning biography contains a full list of Perec's works.

The first American edition was published in 1993 by David R. Godine, Publisher.
