= Hocus Bogus =

Book by Romain Gary

- First edition
- Author: Émile Ajar (Romain Gary)
- Original title: Pseudo
- Translator: David Bellos
- Language: French
- Publisher: Mercure de France
- Publication date: 1976
- Publication place: France
- English publication date: 2010
- Pages: 213

Hocus Bogus (French: Pseudo) is a 1976 novel by the French writer Romain Gary, published under the pseudonym Émile Ajar. The book was written after Paul Pavlowitch, the son of Gary's cousin, had been presented as the man behind the pseudonym Ajar. It asserts to tell the story of Pavlowitch's literary experiences from his own perspective, and comments on the recent success with The Life Before Us, the subsequent speculation that the author might be Gary, as well as explains his reclusiveness with the revelation that he has schizophrenia.

== Reception ==
Michael Dirda reviewed the book in The Washington Post in 2010, and wrote that "In truth, Hocus Bogus is an utterly convincing impersonation of an artistically gifted schizophrenic, worthy to stand on the same shelf as Paul Ableman's classic I Hear Voices and Louis Wolfson's Le Schizo et les Langues." Dirda commented on how the book successfully had suppressed the rumours that Ajar was somebody else than Pavlowitch, and continued: "Nowadays, we can more fully appreciate the tour de force that Gary brings off[.] ... To read Hocus Bogus in Bellos's superb translation is to marvel at its dizzyingly distorted syntax ('I don't speak Danish, but not well enough'), constant wit ('reptiles are always first in the firing line when it comes to hate speech') and sheer energy."

== See also ==
- 1976 in literature
- 20th-century French literature
