= Laurice Schehadé =

Lebanese novelist and poet

Laurice Schehadé (also Laurice Schehadé-Benzoni; 1908–2008) was a Lebanese novelist and poet.

== Biography ==
Born in Egypt of French-speaking Lebanese parents. There was at least one sibling, a brother, Georges Schehadé. The family was of Greek orthodox aristocratic French-speaking ancestry. Schehadé studied in Beirut. In 1934, she married an Italian diplomat, the Marquis Giorgio Benzoni, whom she met in Damascus, and then lived abroad in Sarajevo, Poland, Czechoslovakia, Paris, and Holland.

Schehadé published short-run booklets, which were largely autobiographical fictions, returning to her past and expressing in fluid poetic language her nostalgia for Lebanon and the days of her childhood. Several of these short texts were collected in 1999 under the title Les Livres d'Anne; included is a historical depiction of violence in Lebanon.

== Selected works ==
- Journal d'Anne (1947; ISBN 2-84289-279-8)
- Récit d'Anne (1950)
- Le temps est un voleur d'images (1952)
- La Fille royale et blanche (1953).
- Fleurs de chardon (1955)
- Portes disparues (1956)
- Jardins d'orangers amers (1956)
- Les Grandes horloges (1961)
- Le Batelier du vent (1961)
- J'ai donné au silence ta voix (1962)
- Du ruisseau de l'aube (1966)
- Un jeu d'enfant (2000)
- Les larmes ont la couleur de l'eau (2004)
