= The Wanderer (1967 film) =

- Directed by: Jean-Gabriel Albicocco
- Starring: Brigitte Fossey; Jean Blaise
- Release date: 29 September 1967
- Running time: 1h 55min
- Country: France
- Language: French

The Wanderer (French: Le Grand Meaulnes) is a 1967 French drama film based on the novel Le Grand Meaulnes by Alain-Fournier.

== Cast ==
- Brigitte Fossey - Yvonne de Galais
- Jean Blaise - Augustin Meaulnes
- Alain Libolt - François Seurel
- Alain Noury - Frantz de Galais
- Juliette Villard - Valentine Blondeau
- Christian de Tillière - Ganache
- Marcel Cuvelier - Monsieur Seurel
- Thérèse Quentin - Madame Seurel
