= Ludmila Mikaël =

French actress (born 1947)

- Born: 27 April 1947 (age 79); Bois-Colombes, France
- Occupation: Actress
- Years active: 1965–present
- Spouse: Terry Hands (1974–1980; divorced)
- Children: Marina Hands

Ludmila Mikaël (born 27 April 1947) is a French actress.

She has appeared in more than eighty films since 1967.

== Selected filmography ==
Film
Year	Title	Role	Notes
2003	Le Cœur des hommes	Françoise	
2002	Seaside	Anne	
2001	15 August	Louise Abel	
1992	Dien Bien Phu	Béatrice Vergnes	
1989	Noce Blanche	Catherine Hainaut	Nominated—César Award for Best Supporting Actress
1988	Natalia	Catherine Valence	
1979	The Police War	The Magistrate	
1974	Vincent, François, Paul and the Others	Marie	
1974	The Man Who Sleeps	Narrator	Voice
1968	The Sergeant	Solange	

TV
Year	Title	Role	Notes
2011	Braquo	Irène Bleuvenne	Irène Bleuvenne
