= Jacques Tati: His Life and Art =

1999 Biography by David Bellos

- Author: David Bellos
- Language: English
- Subject: Jacques Tati
- Publisher: Harvill Press
- Publication date: 1999
- Publication place: United Kingdom
- Pages: 382
- ISBN: 9781860466519

Jacques Tati: His Life and Art is a biography of the French filmmaker, actor and comedian Jacques Tati by the English writer David Bellos. It covers Tati's life and work, including his family background, his influences, his differences compared to filmmakers such as Charles Chaplin, and how his combination of limited understanding of the economic side of filmmaking and full creative control came to halt his career.
