= Mixed music =

Music combining acoustic instruments and electronics

Mixed music describes music combining acoustic instruments and electronics. Mixed music is a subcategory of electroacoustic music. While this term may be applied to many genres, the it generally refers to contemporary classical music and, is therefore distinct from live electronic music.

The term Mixed music is probably a calque of the French musique mixte.

== History ==
Electroacoustic music originated in the late 1940s through early 1950s through the musique concrète movement spearheaded by Pierre Schaeffer and the Groupe de recherches musicales based in Paris, France and the development of sound synthesis at the Studio for Electronic Music of Cologne, Germany. The practice of using magnetic tape as a recording medium gave rise to the genre of tape music, wherein the musical composition is stored on and played from tape, without any live performance. Mixed music began as an integration between tape music and traditional performance, where human musicians perform simultaneously with an electronic part played on tape.

=== Significant early works ===
- Bruno Maderna: Musica su due dimensioni (1952) for flute, tape, and percussion
- Otto Luening: Invention in Twelve Tones (1952) for flute and tape
- Edgar Varèse: Déserts (1954) for 14 winds (brass and woodwinds), 5 percussionists, piano & tape
- Bruno Maderna: Musica su due dimensioni (1958) for flute and tape
- Iannis Xenakis: Analogique A et B (1959) for three violins, three cellos, three contrabasses & tape
- Luigi Nono: La Fabbrica illuminata (1964) for soprano & tape

== Technical categories ==
Over the years, three main technical categories of mixed music have developed, reflecting the evolving role of the electronics and the degree of interactivity with the performers.

- Fixed media and performer refers to an electronic part that does not interact with the performers. All sounds are precomposed for the performers and electronics, without any possibility for the performer's gestures to influence the sound.
- Live electronics introduces the possibility of interaction between the performers and electronics through manipulating the sound captured live via microphone, such as adding live effects or interpreting certain sonic parameters of a performance and using it to influence subsequent sonic output.
- Augmented performer involves modifying instruments or performers' bodies to affect and capture the resulting sound of the performance gestures. This could capture otherwise inaudible sounds, such as keyclicks in a flute, or capture non-sonic gestures such as movement to influence the resulting sound.

== Associated institutions & significant works ==
A number of institutions have been key in the evolution of technologies pertinent to the creation of mixed music:

- L'Institut de Recherche et Coordination Acoustique/Musique (IRCAM), Paris
  - Boulez, Pierre Répons (1981, revised 1984) for six soloists, chamber orchestra, and live-electronics
  - Boulez, Pierre Dialogue de l'ombre double (1985) for clarinet & fixed-media playback
  - Manoury, Philippe Jupiter (1987) for flute & live-electronics
  - Manoury, Philippe En Echo (1993–94) for soprano & live-electronics
  - Boulez, Pierre …explosante-fixe… (1993) version for midi-flute, two solo flutes chamber ensemble & live-electronics
- Experimentalstudio des SWR, Freiburg
  - Nono, Luigi Prometeo (1981, revised 1985) for five vocal soloists, two speakers, choir, orchestra & combined live-electronics & fixed-media playback
- Studio for Electronic Music Westdeutscher Rundfunk, Cologne
  - Stockhausen, Karlheinz Kontakte (1960) for piano, percussion & fixed-media playback
  - Stockhausen, Karlheinz Mixtur (1964) for orchestra, four sine-wave generators & four ring-modulators
  - Stockhausen, Karlheinz Mikrophonie I (1964) for two tam-tams & microphones with band-pass filters
  - Stockhausen, Karlheinz Mikrophonie II (1965) for twelve singers, Hammond organ, four ring-modulators & fixed-media playback
  - Stockhausen, Karlheinz Hymnen (1969), version for orchestra & fixed-media playback
  - Stockhausen, Karlheinz Mantra (1970) for two pianos with ring-modulation
- Center for Computer Research in Music and Acoustics (CCRMA), Stanford
- Center for New Music and Audio Technologies (CNMAT), Berkeley
- Columbia-Princeton Electronic Music Center, New York

== Suggested further reading ==
- Puckette, Miller The Theory and Technique of Electronic Music, May 23, 2007; World Scientific Publishing Company (978-9812700773)
- Schaeffer, Pierre In Search of a Concrete Music, January 8, 2013; University of California Press (978-0520265745)
- Manoury, Philippe La musique du temps reél, 2012, Éditions MF (978-2915794564)
