= Pierre Albuisson =

French postage stamp engraver and designer

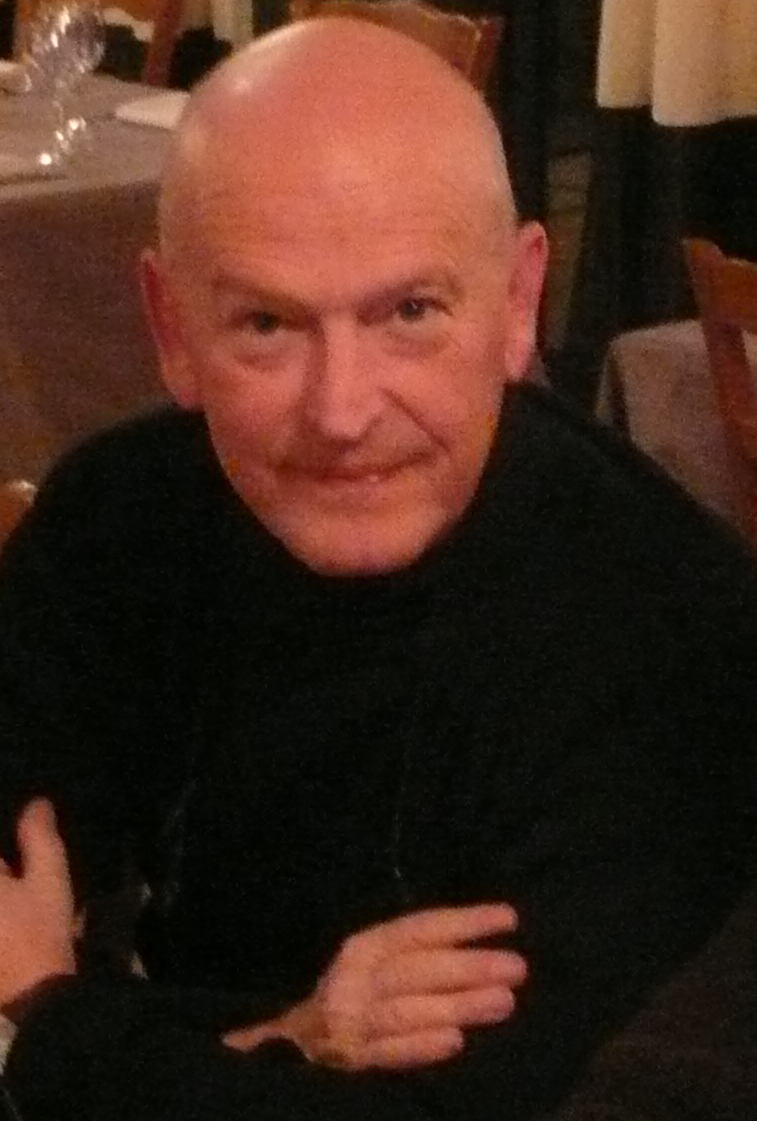
Pierre Albuisson (2008)

Pierre Albuisson (born 26 September 1952 in Madagascar) is a French postage stamp engraver and designer.

== Biography ==
In the 1970s he studied in the École des Beaux-Arts in Mâcon. He was quickly awarded with the French title of Meilleur Ouvrier de France in the different arts of engraving on copper in 1979 and 1986 and on steel in 1986.

He illustrated some novels before designing postage stamps, starting in 1981 with a stamp for Mali representing Pierre Curie. His first stamp for Metropolitan France was issued 1984 and represented the Postman Cheval's Ideal Palace.

Since February 2005, he presides the Art du timbre gravé association whose goal is to promote the use of intaglio for stamp designing.

== Stamps ==
Albuisson has designed stamps for the postal administrations of France, Monaco and several previous French colonies.

== Books illustrations ==
- Roger Caillois, Trois leçons des ténèbres, Fata Morgana, 1978 and 1989
- Marguerite Yourcenar, Écrit dans un jardin, Fata Morgana, 1992
