= The Man Who Sleeps =

- Theatrical release poster
- French: Une homme qui dort
- Directed by: Georges Perec; Bernard Queysanne
- Screenplay by: Georges Perec
- Based on: A Man Asleep by Georges Perec
- Starring: Jacques Spiesser
- Narrated by: Ludmila Mikaël
- Cinematography: Bernard Zitzermann
- Edited by: Andrée Davanture; Agnès Molinard
- Music by: Philippe Drogoz; Eugénie Kuffler
- Production companies: Dovidis; SATPEC
- Release date: 24 April 1974 (France)
- Running time: 77 minutes
- Country: France
- Language: French

The Man Who Sleeps (French: Un homme qui dort) is a 1974 French drama film directed by Bernard Queysanne and Georges Perec, based on Perec's 1967 novel A Man Asleep.

The story centers on an unnamed university student, referred to as "you" by the narrator, as he suddenly quits attending school, cuts off his friends, and attempts to lead a fully automaton-like life devoid of human interaction. His inner thoughts are narrated in the form of an unwritten diary by Ludmila Mikaël in the original French version, and Shelley Duvall in English. A sense of paranoia and claustrophobia develops until he ultimately determines that, no matter what he does, life is futile. As a result, he dismisses isolation as a radical practice, and returns to normal life.

The film is the directorial debut of both Bernard Queysanne and Georges Perec. The film's script is borrowed completely from the text of the novel itself, though many parts were condensed to be brought to screen. The film was almost lost before being restored on DVD in 2007.

The film was a small critical success, with reviewers citing its psychological drama and unique filmic structure. The film won the Prix Jean Vigo in 1974.

== Plot ==
An alienated young student (Jacques Spiesser) wanders the streets of Paris. His inner thoughts are narrated in the form of an unwritten diary by Ludmila Mikaël. The English language version is narrated by Shelley Duvall.

== Production ==
=== Origin ===
Before starting work on the film, Perec had written dozens of unpublished film scripts and published many critical reviews of other filmmakers. He met his partner, film director Catherine Binet, in 1974, and this may have inspired him to start work on a film of his own. He met Queysanne around the same time, and the two bonded over their shared love of Jerry Lewis, Billy Wilder, and other melodramatic works, as well as French auteurs Georges Franju and Jean Grémillon. Queysanne later said that despite the influences, Un homme qui dort bears no resemblance to the works of any of these artists.

Before starting production, Queysanne and Perec watched Hiroshima mon amour together repeatedly, and Perec even included specific references to it in the film's script despite objections.

Perec was long discouraged from filmmaking because he thought it was too consumerist, saying the industry was "entirely dominated by market ideology which [...] functions in 99% of cases as a reductive constraint."

=== Pre-production ===
Queysanne pitched the film as, "three different works, image, text, sound, which form a story, a story which creates emotion," while Perec pitched it as "a feature film where there is only one character, no story, no events, no dialogue, but only a text read by voice-over." The pair received funding from Dovidis, company known for supporting radically experimental filmmaking. Additionally, the pair was able to get funds from SATPEC, a production company based in Queysanne's home country of Tunisia.

=== Filming ===
Principal photography was done in Paris, France, primarily in a one-room chambre de bonne rented by the title character. In the room, he is recorded reading the works of Raymond Aron and Henri Lefebvre, two of the directors' favorite authors. He is also recorded roaming around fields and public squares, frequently visiting cheap restaurants and cinemas. Other locations include Perec's childhood home in rue Vilin. The pair intended to film in Clichy as well, but abandoned the idea. The film was recorded in black-and-white, despite color film being easily available. The score was composed by Philippe Drogoz and Eugénie Kuffler, working together in the contemporary cabaret ensemble 010. Though most of the recording was done in mundane environments, some non-realist settings are also used. Filming was also done in many open environments, such as abandoned classrooms and empty city areas. Perec particularly wished to use travelling shots, citing their influence on his literary work. He also wished to depict the protagonists environment as three-dimensional, organizing the images and drawing a vanishing point in every frame.

Cinematography was done by Bernard Zitzermann, with the film being his first job as a cinematographer. He later went on to shoot for many popular directors, including Claude Chabrol. The film was edited by Andrée Davanture and Agnès Molinard, who attempted to make the film feel fluid and cyclical, ending the film on the same frame it starts with and using slow cross dissolves to transition between shots.

=== Distribution ===
The film was released theatrically on 24 April 1974. It was later restored and released on DVD in 2007, bundled with copies of the film's script.

== Reception ==
=== Critical response ===
Un homme qui dort received some critical acclaim among its small audience. There is no entry for it on Rotten Tomatoes or Metacritic.

The film won the Prix Jean Vigo in 1974. The film was shown out of competition at the 1974 Cannes Film Festival.
