= Marcel Cuvelier =

French actor

- Born: 14 May 1924; Glageon, Nord, France
- Died: 6 January 2015 (aged 90); Paris, Ile-de-France, France
- Occupation: Actor
- Years active: 1958–2008 (Film and TV)

Marcel Cuvelier (1924–2015) was a French film, stage and television actor. He was also a theatre director. He appeared in character roles in French cinema for several decades. He was married to the actress Thérèse Quentin.

== Selected filmography ==
- Elevator to the Gallows (1958)
- No Burials on Sunday (1960)
- La Vérité (1960)
- Le Combat dans l'île (1962)
- Le Doulos (1962)
- Don't Tempt the Devil (1963)
- The War Is Over (1966)
- The Wanderer (1967)
- Lagardère (1967, TV series)
- The Confession (1970)
- The New Adventures of Vidocq (1971, TV series)
- Kamouraska (1973)
- The Inheritor (1973)
- Eugène Sue (1974)
- Stavisky (1974)
- Les Ambassadeurs (1975)

== Bibliography ==
- Kahn, Douglas & Higgins, Hannah. (ed.) Mainframe Experimentalism: Early Computing and the Foundations of the Digital Arts. University of California Press, 2023.
- Rubin, Don, Nagy, Peter & Rouyer, Phillippe. (ed.) World Encyclopedia of Contemporary Theatre: Volume 1: Europe. Taylor & Francis, 2013.
