= A Man Asleep =

1967 novel

- First American edition of the English-language translation
- Author: Georges Perec
- Original title: Un homme qui dort
- Translator: Andrew Leak
- Language: French
- Publisher: Éditions Denoël
- Publication date: 1967
- Publication place: France
- English publication date: 1990
- Pages: 167

A Man Asleep (French: Un homme qui dort) is a 1967 novel by the French writer Georges Perec. It uses second-person narrative and follows a 25-year-old student who one day decides to be indifferent about the world. A Man Asleep was adapted into a 1974 film, The Man Who Sleeps.

== Publication ==
The novel was published in France through Éditions Denoël in 1967. An English translation by Andrew Leak was published in 1990 through Collins Harvill in the United Kingdom and David R. Godine, Publisher in the United States, in a shared volume with Perec's first novel, Things: A Story of the Sixties.

== Reception ==
Upon the American release, Richard Eder of the Los Angeles Times compared the two novels of the volume—Things and A Man Asleep—and wrote that Things was "the more engaging of the two, though less focused and ultimately, perhaps, less memorable." He wrote that in A Man Asleep, "Perec shows a beauty on the far side of the void; a humanity on the far side of refusal."

== See also ==
- 1967 in literature
- 20th-century French literature
