= Philippe Lejeune =

French professor and essayist

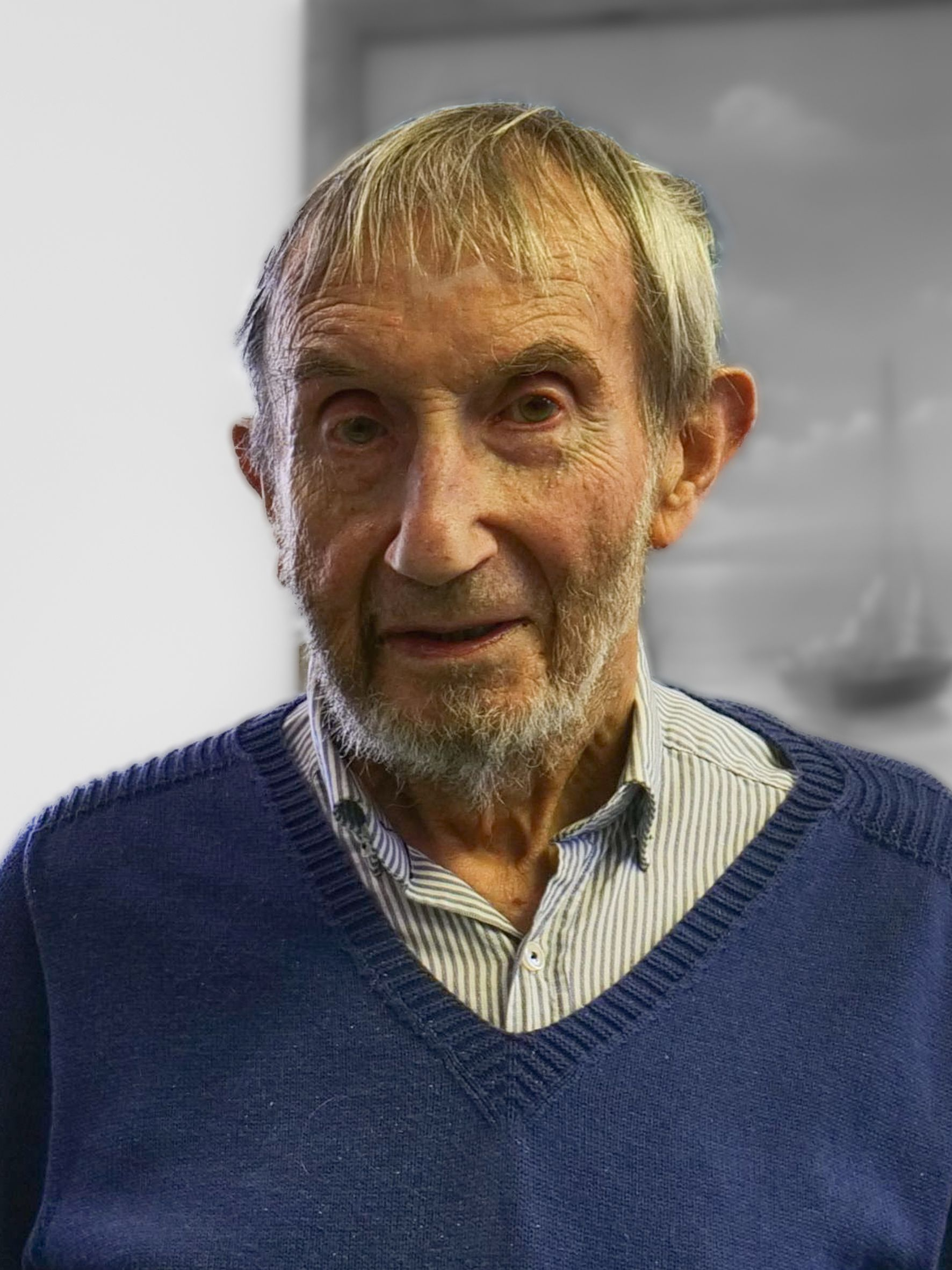
- Philippe Lejeune
- Born: 13 August 1938; France
- Occupation: Writer
- Years active: 1970–2008

Philippe Lejeune (French pronunciation: [filip ləʒœn]; born 13 August 1938) is a French professor and essayist, known as a specialist in autobiography. He is the author of numerous works on the subject of autobiography and personal journals. He is a cofounder of the Association pour l'autobiographie et le patrimoine autobiographique (Association for Autobiography and Autobiographical Heritage) created in Paris in 1992.

As Lejeune notes in The Practice of the Private Journal, "the diary is a social outcast, of no fixed theoretical address," a problematic profile that has caused one of the most widely practiced autobiographical forms to be largely ignored or misrepresented. Lejeune’s scholarship has been instrumental in revising such intellectual snobbery (including his own, as he readily admits). — Laurie McNeill

In this sense, Lejeune tried to establish a basic theory that allows scholars to better classify this popular genre beginning by providing a definition of autobiography: "[it is] the retrospective record in prose that a real person gives of his or her own being, emphasizing the personal life and in particular the 'story of life'." He also formulated the underlying concept of this narrative form: "In order to create an autobiography, the author enters into a pact or contract with the readers, promising to give a detailed account of his or her life, and of nothing but that life."

So the autobiography is characterized by the dual approach of introspection and a claim for truth. Nevertheless, he concedes that there are multiple factors (memory deficiencies, untruthfulness or excessive candor, the chosen narrative method etc.) that might constrain the wish to bring one's own life into a readable form.

Novelist and filmmaker Alain Robbe-Grillet, upon writing down his own life in Le Miroir qui revient (1985, English translation by Jo Levy: Ghosts in the Mirror, 1988), opposed Lejeune's concept of the autobiographical pact, which sparked a lengthy controversy about the concept among French intellectuals.

== Works ==
- 1971: L'Autobiographie en France
- 1975: Le Pacte autobiographique
- 1980: Je est un autre. L'autobiographie de la littérature aux médias
- 1986: Moi aussi
  - 1989: On Autobiography, translated by Katherine Leary (U of Minnesota Press 1989)
- 1990 «Cher cahier...» Témoignages sur le journal personnel
- 1990: La Pratique du journal personnel
- 1993 Le Moi des demoiselles. Enquête sur le journal de jeune fille
- 1997: Un journal à soi, ou la passion des journaux intimes
- 1998: Pour l'autobiographie
- 2000: Les Brouillons de soi
- 2000: «Cher écran...» Journal personnel, ordinateur, Internet
- 2005: Signes de vie (Le pacte autobiographique, 2) (2005)
- 2006: Le Journal intime. Histoire et anthologie
  - 2009: English translation by Katherine Durnin: On Diary (University of Hawai'i Press 2009)
- 2013: Autogenèses. Brouillons de soi 2
