= W, or the Memory of Childhood =

Novel by Georges Perec

- Original French edition
- Author: Georges Perec
- Original title: W ou le souvenir d'enfance
- Translator: David Bellos
- Language: French
- Genre: Semi-autobiographical novel
- Published: 1975 Denöel (Original French); 1988 The Harvill Press (English Translation)
- Publication place: France
- Media type: Print (Hardcover, Paperback)

W, or the Memory of Childhood (French: W ou le souvenir d'enfance) is a semi-autobiographical work of fiction by Georges Perec, published in 1975. Perec's novel consists of alternating chapters of autobiography and a fictional story, divided into two parts. The autobiographical thread is a collection of uncertain memories, as well as descriptions of photos which preserve moments from Perec's childhood. The memories in the first part of the book lead up to Perec's separation from his mother when he was evacuated in the Second World War. The second part recollects his life as an evacuee. The adult narrator sometimes provides interpretations of the childhood memories, and often comments on details of the memories which his research showed to be false or borrowed.

== Plot ==
In the first part, the fictional narrator is contacted by a mysterious individual, who informs him of the disappearance of a deaf and dumb boy in a shipwreck. The boy is also called Gaspard Winkler—the adult narrator of the story discovers that he took on the boy's identity after deserting the army, although at that time he believed he had been given forged identity papers.

In the second part, the fictional narrative (apparently based on a story written by Perec at the age of thirteen) recounts the founding and organisation of a remote island country called W, said to be situated near Tierra del Fuego. Life in W, seemingly modeled on the Olympic ideal, revolves around sport and competition. While at first it seems a Utopia, successive chapters gradually reveal the arbitrary and cruel rules that govern the lives of the athletes.

The final autobiographical chapter links back to the fictional narrative by a quotation from David Rousset about the Nazi death camps, where Perec's mother died: by now the reader has discovered that the story of the island is an allegory of life in the camps.

Like much of Perec's work, W is characterized by word play. The title W is a pun on "double vé/vie", referring to the two lives and two stories narrated in the text.

== Publishing history ==
- Georges Perec, W ou le souvenir d'enfance (Paris: Denöel, 1975)
- Georges Perec, W, or the Memory of Childhood trans. by David Bellos (London: Harvill, 1988)
- Georges Perec, W, or the Memory of Childhood trans. by David Bellos (Boston: David R. Godine, Publisher, 2002)
