= David Bellos =

British academic, translator and biographer (1945–2025)

David Michael Bellos (25 June 1945 – 26 October 2025) was a British academic, translator and biographer. He was the Meredith Howland Pyne professor of French and comparative literature at Princeton University in the United States, and was the co-founder and first director, from 2007, of its translation and intercultural communication program.

== Early life and education ==
Bellos was born in Rochford, England, on 25 June 1945, and educated in nearby Southend-on-Sea. He earned an undergraduate degree in medieval and modern languages (French and Russian) in 1967 and a D.Phil in French literature in 1971, both at the University of Oxford.

== Career ==
Bellos wrote literary biographies of Romain Gary and Georges Perec, and published work on Honoré de Balzac; and his The Novel of the Century tells the story of the writing of Les Misérables by Victor Hugo. He composed a biography of the filmmaker Jacques Tati, Jacques Tati: His Life and Art, and appeared in the documentary The Magnificent Tati.

Other works include an introduction to translation studies, Is That a Fish in Your Ear? Translation and The Meaning of Everything (2011) and Who Owns This Sentence. A History of Copyrights and Wrongs, written with Alexandre Montagu and published in 2024.

He translated much of the work of Perec into English, including the novel Life: A User's Manual.

Bellos won the first Man Booker International Prize for translation in 2005 for his translations of works by Albanian author Ismail Kadare, despite not speaking Albanian. His translations were done from previous French translations.

== Personal life and death ==
Bellos' marriages to Hélène Roth-Laszlo and Susan Lendrum ended in divorce. At the time of his death he was married to Pascale Voilley Bellos. He was the father of three children (and seven grandchildren), including writer and broadcaster Alex Bellos. David Bellos died at his vacation home in Doussard, France, on 26 October 2025, at the age of 80.

== Awards and honours ==
- 1988 French-American Foundation prize for translation
- 1994 Prix Goncourt de la Biographie
- 2005 Man Booker International Prize, for translation of works by Ismail Kadare
- 2015 Officier of the Ordre des Arts et des Lettres
- 2017 American Library in Paris Book Award winner for The Novel of the Century
- 2019 Howard T. Behrman Award for Distinguished Achievement in the Humanities, Princeton University

== Publications ==
=== Translations ===
- Georges Perec: Life A User's Manual, 1987 (French-American Foundation's translation prize); new edition, 2008
- Georges Perec: W, or the Memory of Childhood, 1988
- Georges Perec: Things: A Story of the Sixties, 1990
- Georges Perec: 53 Days, 1992
- Ismail Kadare: The Pyramid, 1995
- Ismail Kadare:The File on H, 1996
- Georges Ifrah: A Universal History of Numbers, 2000
- Ismail Kadare: Spring Flowers, Spring Frost, 2001
- Fred Vargas: Have Mercy On Us All, 2003
- Fred Vargas: Seeking Whom He May Devour, 2004
- Ismail Kadare: The Successor, 2005
- Ismail Kadare: Agamemnon's Daughter, 2006
- Ismail Kadare: The Siege, 2008
- Hélène Berr: Journal, 2008
- Georges Perec: Thoughts of Sorts, 2009
- Romain Gary: Hocus Bogus, 2010
- Georges Perec: The Art and Craft of Approaching Your Head of Department to Submit a Request for a Raise, 2011
- Georges Simenon: Pietr the Latvian, 2013
- Daniel Anselme: On Leave, 2014
- Ismail Kadare: Twilight of the Eastern Gods, 2014
- Georges Perec: Portrait of a Man, 2014 (UK), 2015 (USA)
- Georges Perec: I Remember, 2014 (USA) (with Philip Terry)
- Paul Fournel, Dear Reader, 2014 (UK)
- Georges Simenon: The Pitards, 2015
- Frédéric Dard, Bird in a Cage2016 (UK)
- Delphine Horvilleur, Anti-Semitism Revisited, 2021 (UK)
- Maxime Rovere, How To Deal With Idiots (and stop being one yourself), 2021 (UK)
- Victor Hugo, Seventeen Ninety-Three, forthcoming 2026 (UK)

=== Biographies ===
- Georges Perec. A Life in Words, 1993. (Prix Goncourt de la biographie). French edition, 1994. Japanese edition, 2014. Hebrew edition, 2016. New edition in French, 2022; German translation, 2023; Turkish and Chinese translations in progress.
- Jacques Tati: His Life and Art, 1999. French edition, 2002; Italian edition, 2022. German edition, 2024
- Romain Gary. A Tall Story, Harvill Secker, November 2010

=== Other books ===
- Balzac Criticism in France, 1850–1900. The Making of a Reputation. Oxford, 1976
- La Cousine Bette. A Critical Guide. London, 1981
- Old Goriot (Landmarks of World Literature). Cambridge, 1987. Hebrew translation, Tek Aviv, 1990.
- Is That a Fish in Your Ear? Translation and the Meaning of Everything. London and New York, 2011. Paperback edition, 2012.
  French translation by Daniel Loayza as Le poisson & le bananier, Flammarion, 2012, republished in 2017 as La Traduction dans tous ses états. Spanish translation by Vicente Campos, as Un Pez en la higuera. Ariel, 2012. German translation by Silvia Morawetz as Was macht der Fisch in meinem Ohr?, Eichborn, 2013. Russian translation by Natalia Shahova, Azbuka, 2019. Traditional Chinese translation, Rye Field, Taipei, 2019. Also translated into Simplified Chinese, Korean, Japanese and Persian.
- The Novel of the Century: The Extraordinary Adventure of Les Misérables. London and New York, 2017. Korean edition, 2018. Japanese edition, 2018. Chinese edition, 2019
- Who Owns This Sentence? A History of Copyrights and Wrongs. With Alexandre Montagu. London and New York, 2024. Italian edition 2024. Korean edition 2024. Spanish edition 2025.
