= Théâtre de la Huchette =

Theatre in Paris, France

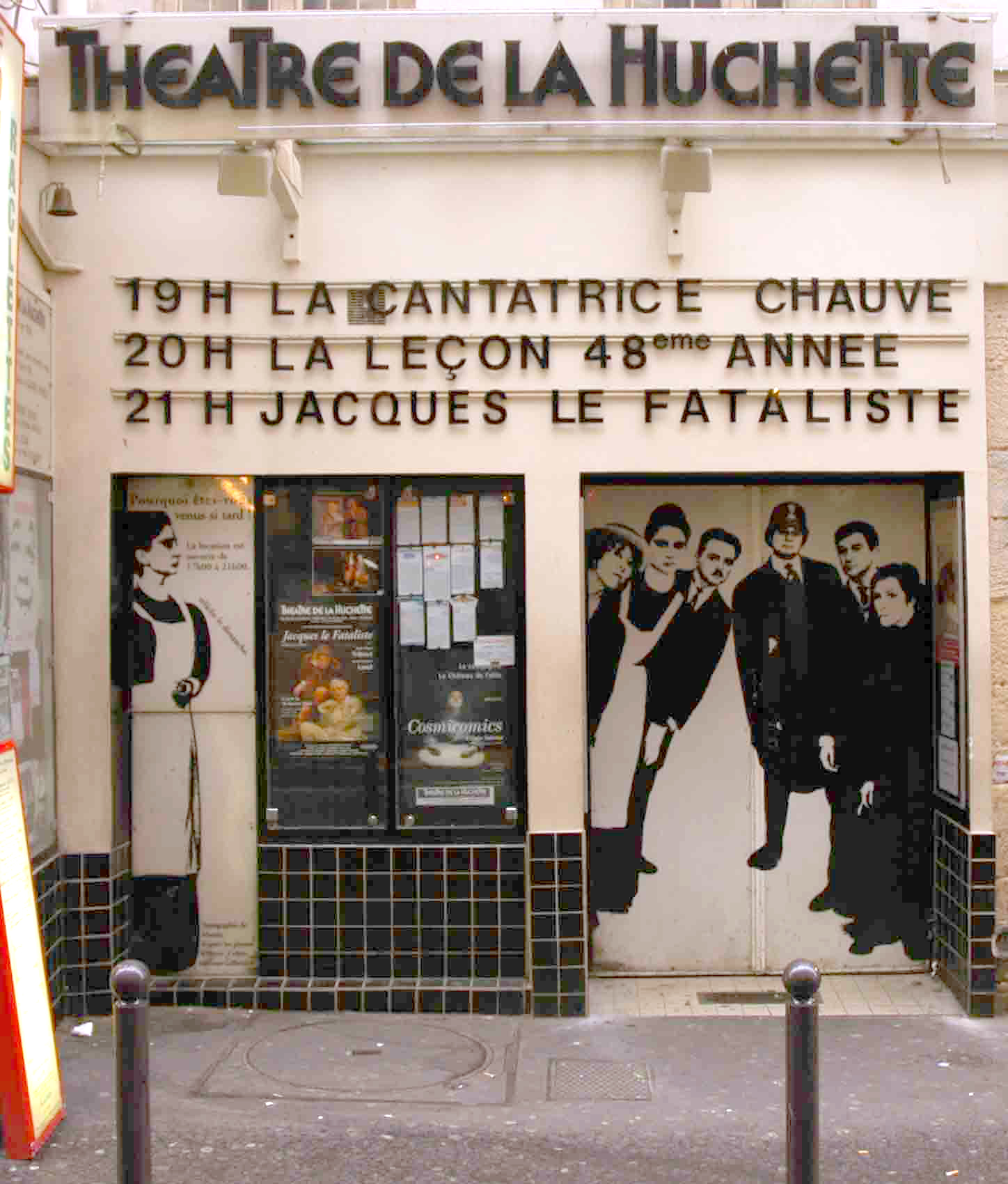
- Facade of the theatre

- Location in Paris
- Address: 23 rue de la Huchette
- Location: Paris, France
- Coordinates: 48°51′11″N 2°20′43″E
- Capacity: 85
- Event: Theatre
- Production: The Lesson and The Bald Soprano
- Public transit: Saint-Michel (Métro), Saint-Michel – Notre-Dame (RER)

Construction
- Opened: 1948

Website
- www.theatre-huchette.com

The Théâtre de la Huchette (French pronunciation: [teɑtʁ də la yʃɛt]) is a theatre in Paris.

This small theatre in Paris' Left Bank, located at 23 rue de la Huchette in the 5th arrondissement, is known for playing Eugène Ionesco's absurdist double-bill of The Lesson and The Bald Soprano in permanent repertory since 1957, as Spectacle Ionesco. Today, a third play is presented and this changes from time to time. Despite the theatre's tiny size of only 85 seats, a total of over one and a half million spectators have attended the show.

The theatre's first production, by Georges Vitaly, was Albertina by Valentino Bompiani. The date was 26 April 1948. In 1951, he premièred Georges Schehadés first play Monsieur Bobl'le.

In 1952, Marcel Pinard took over as owner, and brought to the theatre the works of Jean Genet, Federico García Lorca, Ivan Turgenev, Eugène Ionesco and Jean Tardieu.

The closest métro and RER stations are: Saint-Michel and Saint-Michel – Notre-Dame.

== History ==
The theater was created in 1948 by Georges Vitaly and had its first production on April 26, 1948, Albertina by Valentino Bompiani. The theater was a part of the explosion of creativity and culture following the end of the occupation of Paris.

The theater began showing Ionesco's The Bald Soprano (La Cantatrice chauve) followed directly by The Lesson on 16 February 1957. This was a revival of The Bald Soprano, as the play on its own had been poorly received by critics and the public on its own, performed at Théàtre des Noctambules in 1950 before being stopped after only 25 performances. As of February 2017, the two plays have been performed more than 18,000 times at the theater, holding the record for longest running show without interruption at a single theater.

In 1975, owner Marcel Pinard suffered a fatal heart attack in the theater's box office. Following his death the actors who had played the Ionesco double bill since 1957 battled to prevent the closure of the theater, eventually forming their own theater company to continue production.
