= Things: A Story of the Sixties =

Novel by Georges Perec

- First English-language translation
- Author: Georges Perec
- Original title: Les Choses
- Translator: Helen R. Lane
- Language: French
- Subject: Consumerism, modernity
- Published: 1965 by Julliard
- Publication place: France
- English publication date: 1968 by Grove Press
- Pages: 157
- Awards: Prix Renaudot
- ISBN: 978-2266197816

Things: A Story of the Sixties (French: Les Choses: Une histoire des années soixante) is a 1965 novel by Georges Perec, his first.

The novel met with popular and critical success and won the Prix Renaudot in 1965.

== Publication history ==
It was first published in French as Les Choses : Une histoire des années soixante in September 1965 by Éditions Julliard in the "Lettres nouvelles" series directed by Maurice Nadeau.

In 1968, the first English translation by Helen Lane was published by Grove Press under the title Les Choses: A Story of the Sixties.

It was translated again in 1990 by David Bellos and published by Collins Harvill in the United Kingdom and David R. Godine in the United States, both editions in a shared volume with A Man Asleep.

== Themes and structure ==
The characters in the novel do not hold as much textual importance as the things (les choses) meticulously described throughout, which are the subject of frequent digressions even in passages focusing on the main characters; no line of dialogue appears until the epilogue. The grammatical tense used by the author progresses from the conditional to the present to the future over the course of the novel. Perec's use of the conditional tense plunges the reader into the dreams of the characters in the novel, most of which focus on their material desires, including residences, furniture, and fashionable clothing. The first chapter consists entirely of a description of a desirable apartment and its furnishings, opening with: "L'œil, d'abord, glisserait sur la moquette grise d'un long corridor, haut et étroit [The eye, at first, would glide over the grey carpet of a long hallway, tall and narrow]."

The main characters are a young couple, the mononymous Jerôme and Sylvie, whose names are first mentioned in the second chapter. The focus on an inseparable couple, rather than a single character, can be seen as a device by which Perec avoids creating any distinct personalities independent of their surroundings.

The first part of the book, which is much longer than the second, does not describe any significant part of the couples' lives in a linear narrative, but reveals that both are in their 20s and work as freelancers in the then-novel fields of opinion polling and market research. This affords them a great deal of leisure time and flexibility, but rarely as much income as they desire, and occasionally so little that they run out of cigarettes and eagerly pursue friends' dinner invitations in order to get enough to eat. Most of their friends have similar jobs, come from similar middle-class backgrounds, and have a few years of post-secondary education behind them. The main characters are equivocal in their work ethic and suspicious of becoming more deeply devoted to a career, although they feel a strong sense of entitlement to the riches and opportunities of the world around them. They are absorbed by a hedonic treadmill in which brief periods of increased prosperity invariably lead back to awareness of new material desires; this cycle is interrupted, but only temporarily, by the Algerian War, during which they turn their attention to anti-fascist political activism. Outside of this interlude, the text focuses on "the ordinary, the banal, the familiar" aspects of the couple's middle-class life, described by Perec as "the sociology of the quotidian."

In the shorter second part of the novel, narrated in the future tense, Jerôme and Sylvie "will attempt to flee" France for a fresh start and find work abroad in Sfax, Tunisia (where the author Georges Perec and his wife lived in 1960–1961). During their 8 months in Sfax, they feel disconnected from the surrounding society and grow increasingly numb even to their formerly intense material desires. After they return to France, the story ends abruptly with a pessimistic view of their future happiness, despite predictions of their increasing material comfort.

The epilogue concludes with a quote from Karl Marx on the means and ends of searching for truth and meaning.
