= Henri Pichette =

French writer and poet (1924–2000)

Henri Pichette (1924–2000) was a French writer and poet.

== Works ==
- Xylophonie (with Antonin Artaud), 1946
- Apoèmes, Gallimard, 1947
- Les Epiphanies, Gallimard, 1948
- Rond-Point, Joyce regular part au futur and pour Pages Chaplin, Mercure de France, 1950
- Lettres Arc-en-Ciel, Lettre rouge, with the response from Max-Pol Fouchet, Lettre Orangée with André Breton, L'Arche, 1950
- Le Point vélique, Mercure de France, 1950
- Nuclear, L'Arche, 1952
- Les Revendications, Mercure de France, 1958
- Odes à chacun, Gallimard, 1961
- Tombeau de Gérard Philipe, Gallimard, 1961
- Dents de lait, dents de loup, Gallimard 1962
  - Epiphanies, definitive edition, Poetry / Gallimard, 1969
- Poèmes offerts, Granit, 1982, Gallimard, 2009
- Notebooks Henri Pichette 1: Défense et illustration, Granit, 1991
- Notebooks Henri Pichette 2: Les Enfances Granit 1995
- Apoèmes, regular Lambeaux d'un amour et d'manuscrit Fragments du "Sélénite" Poetry / Gallimard, 1995
- Notebooks Henri Pichette 3: with Les Epiphanies, The Rubeline, 1997
- Dents de lait, dents de loup, novel, 2005 edition
- Les Ditelis du rouge-gorge, Gallimard, 2005
