= Jet of Blood =

Play written by Antonin Artaud

Jet of Blood (Jet de Sang), also known as Spurt of Blood, is an extremely short play by the French theatre practitioner, Antonin Artaud, who was also the founder of the "Theatre of Cruelty" movement. Jet of Blood was completed in Paris, on January 17, 1925, perhaps in its entirety on that day alone. The original title was Jet de Sang ou la Boule de Verre, but the second half of the title was dropped prior to the first publication and production of the work.

== Characters ==
- A Young Man
- A Young Girl
- A Knight
- A Nurse (Wet-Nurse)
- A Priest
- A Shoemaker
- A Sexton
- A Madam
- A Judge
- A Street Peddler
- A Thunderous Voice
- A scorpion

== Synopsis ==
The play begins with the Young Man and the Young Girl onstage. They declare their love for one another multiple times, in a variety of absurd ways. Then, a hurricane separates the two young lovers. Two stars crash into each other, causing a series of dismembered human body parts to rain down on the stage. As more items fall down, they are to fall more and more slowly. Then, three scorpions, a frog, and a beetle. After reacting to this, the Young Man and Young Girl exit.

The characters of the Knight and the Nurse (or Wet-Nurse) enter. The Knight is wearing a suit of armor from the Middle Ages and the Nurse has enormous swollen breasts. It is implied that these two are the parents of the Young Girl and are somehow related to the Young Man as well. The Nurse claims that she is watching the Young Man and Young Girl "screwing" and that it is "incest." She throws pieces of Swiss cheese wrapped in paper at the Knight who picks them off the ground and eats them. The Nurse and the Knight exit.

The Young Man returns and describes his surroundings at the town square, naming the town's characters as they appear on stage. The Priest asks the Young Man about his corporeal body, and the Young Man replies by turning the conversation back to God. The Priest says, in a Swiss accent, that he is less interested in God than in the "dirty little stories we hear in the confessional." The young man agrees, and following there is another violent spectacle including an earthquake with thunder, lightning, and general panic. A giant hand appears and grabs the Whore's hair, which bursts into flames. A Thunderous Voice says, "Bitch, look at your body," after which the Whore's dress becomes transparent and her body appears hideous and naked underneath. In turn, she bids God leave her and she bites the wrist of the hand, sending an immense jet of blood across the stage.

The lights come up and almost everyone is dead and scattered across the stage. The Young Man and the Whore are still alive and they are mid-coitus and "devouring each other with their eyes". The Nurse enters carrying the body of the Young Girl, which hits the ground and is "flat as a pancake." The Nurse's chest has become completely flat as well. The Knight enters demanding more cheese and the Nurse responds by lifting her dress. The Young Man says, "Don’t hurt Mommy" as though he is suspended in the air like a marionette. The Knight covers his face as scorpions crawl out from the Nurse's vagina. Depending on the translation, the scorpions swarm onto either the Nurse's or the Knight's genitalia, which swells up and bursts or splits, becoming glassy/transparent and shining like the sun.

The Young Man and the Whore run away. The Young Girl wakes up dazed and says the final line of the play, "The Virgin! Ah, so that’s what he was looking for."

The final stage direction is simply, "Curtain."

== Themes and interpretation ==
Artaud presents a fantastic temporal spectrum of creation and destruction speeded up and slowed down, like a phonograph record. Associating gluttony and lust, sex and violence, even innocence and swinishness, The Spurt of Blood attacks the senses with bizarre sights and sounds as it reaches toward our subconscious impulses and fears. (Cardullo and Knoff 2001, 377)

Some conventional interpretations of this unconventional text address the following themes:

- Cruelty (as described in Artaud's Theatre of Cruelty)
- The creation of the world and its desecration by people
- Mocking of contemporary attitudes while objectifying inner life
- The inversion of innocence, love, and security to depravity, lust, and fear
- Juxtaposition of virtuous archetypes with their degenerate actions (e.g. the Knight and the Priest)
- Blasphemy and human transgressions against God
- The wrath of nature
- "Le mal du ciel" or "heaven-sickness" (Cohn, 317)

Images of destruction are recurring in Jet de Sang, with Artaud starting the audience out with a simple, well-ordered world and repeatedly destroying it, using natural disasters, plagues, and storms to throw typical bourgeois characters into chaos and disarray. It is argued that the ruin left in the wake of this destruction is not the ultimate goal. "Despite its violent overturning of cosmic order… Artaud’s literary transgressions are always matched by cries for reunion with a oneness that has been lost," (Jannarone, 42).

Since the original title of Jet of Blood was Jet de Sang ou la Boule de Verre, it is argued that Artaud may have written Jet of Blood in part as a parody of a one-act play by one of his contemporaries, a surrealist named Armand Salacrou. La Boule de Verre has many apparent correlations with Jet de Sang. In both plays the four main characters are the Young Man, the Young Girl, a Knight, and a Nurse. In La Boule de Verre, as in Le Jet de Sang, the young couple exchanges declarations of love, then the couples disappear. The Knight and Nurse reveal they are the Young Girl's parents as well in La Boule de Verre, and the Knight picks up candy wrappers instead of wrapped cheese. There are other associations between the characters in both plays, including the anachronism of the Knight, dependence of the Nurse (Wetnurse), fidelity of the Young Girl, and the idealism of the Young Man (Cohn, 315).

== Publication and production history ==
When Jet of Blood was written in 1925, it was included with Artaud's other writings Paul les Oiseaux and Le Vitre d’Amour in a folder labeled Trois Contes. After its completion, Jet of Blood was not mentioned in Artaud's published letters, nor was it discussed by his acquaintances or biographers. Despite this apparent omission, Artaud included the play in his second book L’Ombilic de Limbes, published by the Nouvelle Revue Francaise. There are several published translations, including English translations by Ruby Cohn, Victor Corti, Lawrence Ferlinghetti, Helen Weaver, and George Wellwarth.

The 1926 publicity blurb for Artaud's Theatre Alfred Jarry listed the premiere of Jet of Blood in their season. However the production was never mounted. The first production took place almost 40 years after it was written, during the Royal Shakespeare Company 'Season of Cruelty' in 1964.

Ruby Cohn's translation of Jet of Blood was the inspiration for Worship, the concluding scene of the stage play Gospel.

Macabre Theatre Ensemble staged the production in 2013 in Ithaca, NY. The production was co-directed by Owen McIlmail and Sean Pollock.

New York-based performance ensemble FOLD staged an adaptation of the work in October 2015. The production was directed by Etienne Pierre Duguay and took place at Manhattan's Albertine, a project of the Cultural Services of the French Embassy. [1] [2] [3]

Montreal-based performance theatre creator, Marissa Blair, presented the play at the 2019 St.-Ambroise Montreal Fringe Festival.

== Bibliography ==
- Benedikt, Michael and George E Wellwarth. Modern French Theatre: An Anthology of Plays. New York: E.P. Dutton & Co., 1966.
- Cardullo, Bert and Robert Knopf. Theatre of the Avant Garde, 1890-1950: A Critical Anthology. New Haven and London: Yale University Press, 2001.
- Cohn, Ruby. "Artaud’s ‘Jet de Sang’: Parody or Cruelty?" Theatre Journal. 31.3 (1979): 312-318.
- Jannarone, Kimberly. "Exercises in Exorcism: The Parodoxes of Form in Artaud’s Early Works." French Forum. 29.2 (2004): 36–53.
