= Tania Balachova =

French actress (1902-1973)

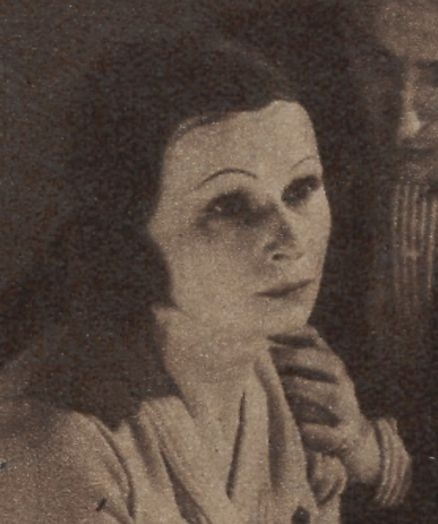
- Born: Tatiana Pavlovna Balachova; 5 February 1902; St. Petersburg, Russia
- Died: 4 August 1973 (aged 71); Bagnoles-de-l'Orne, France
- Education: Royal Conservatory of Brussels
- Occupations: Actor, director, acting teacher
- Spouse: Raymond Rouleau

Tatiana Pavlovna Balachova (Russian: Татьяна Павловна Балашова; 25 February 1902–4 August 1973), known as Tania Balachova, was a Russian-French actress and director. After World War II, she became one of the most influential acting tutors in France.

== Early life ==
Balachova was born in Saint Petersburg on 25 February 1902. Her family emigrated to Brussels, where she studied at the Royal Conservatory. It was at the conservatory that she met her future husband, Belgian actor Raymond Rouleau.

== Career ==
Balachova and Rouleau married and moved together to Paris. There, they collaborated with Gaston Baty, Charles Dullin, Louis Jouvet, Georges Pitoëff, and Antonin Artaud, among others. They separated in 1940, though they continued to work together professionally. She originated the role of Inès in Jean-Paul Sartre's Huis Clos [No Exit] at the Vieux-Colombier Theatre in May 1944.^{:30}

She went on to become an acting tutor in France, training many of its talent in theatre and cinema.

== Death ==
She died in Bagnoles-de-l'Orne on 4 August 1973 of a heart attack.

== Notable students ==
- Niels Arestrup
- Danièle Delorme^{:155}
- Maurice Garrel
- Michael Lonsdale
- Christian Marquand
- Antoine Vitez^{:416}
- Daniel Emilfork

== Selected theatre works ==
Date	Role	Play	Author	Director	Theatre	Reference
January 1928		The Dybbuk	S. Ansky	Gaston Baty	Studio des Champs-Élysées	
2 & 9 June 1928	Indra's Daughter/Agnes	A Dream Play	August Strindberg	Antonin Artaud	Théâtre Alfred Jarry	
May 1944	Inès	Huis Clos [No Exit]	Jean-Paul Sartre	Raymond Rouleau	Théâtre du Vieux-Colombier	
