= Ansgar Allen =

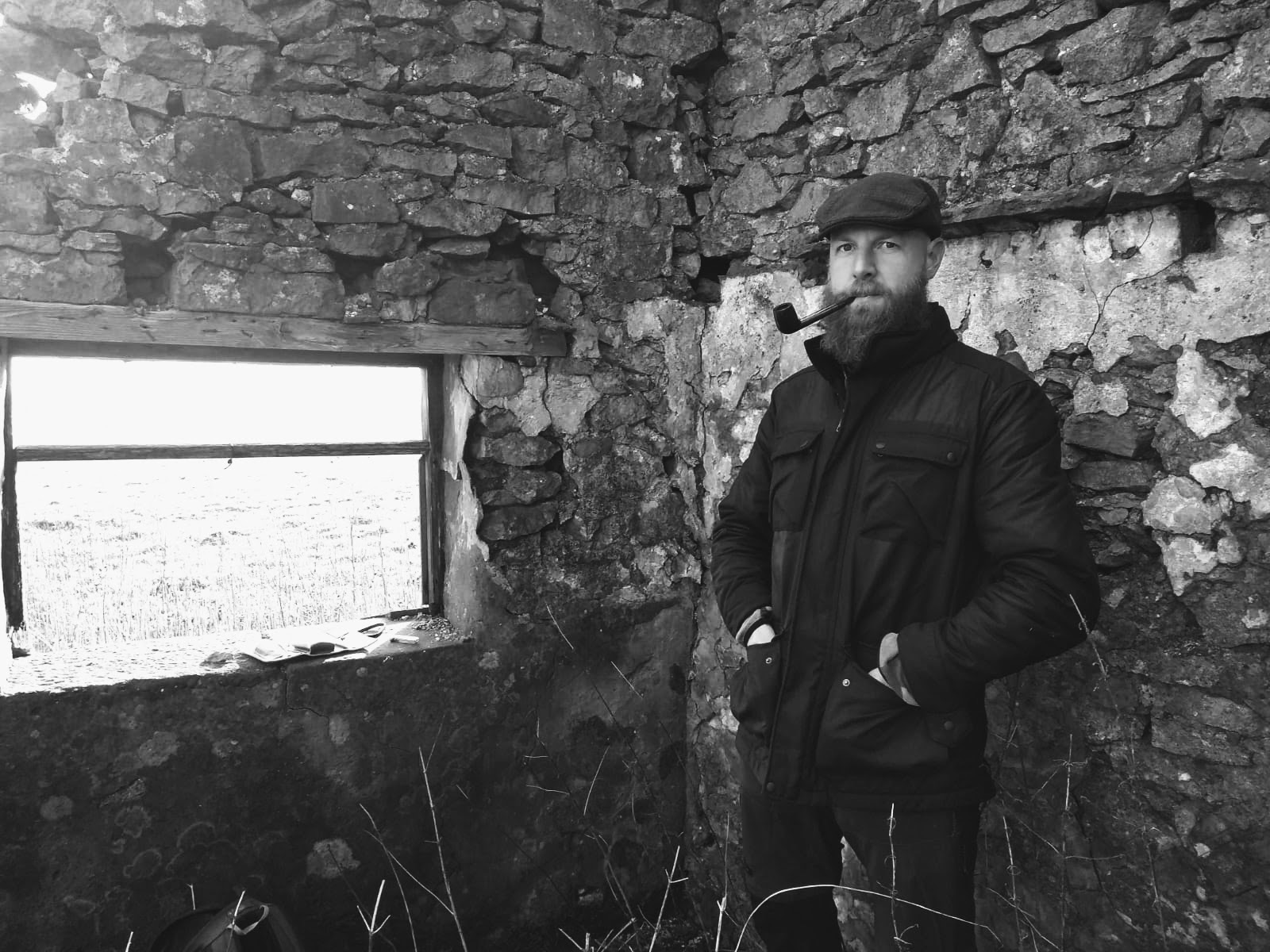
Ansgar Allen at Middleton Moor, Derbyshire, UK

Ansgar Allen is a writer and novelist whose work strays between fiction, philosophy, and critical theory. He is editor-in-chief at Erratum Press which seeks to 'infiltrate literature with "calculated acts of cultural barbarism"'. In addition to his work as a novelist, Allen is known for his academic contributions to the field of educational philosophy and theory, as well as the study of ancient and modern Cynicism.

His works have been widely translated. The novel Wretch (2020) was republished in Spanish translation by the Bogotá-based press, Ediciones Vestigio as Ruin (2023, tr. Ramiro Sanchiz). His volume Cynicism (2020), part of the MIT Press Essential Knowledge series, was republished in Japanese translation by Newton Press (2021, tr. Masamichi Ueno), in Chinese translation by The Commercial Press (2023 tr. Ni Jianqing), and in Persian translation by Maziar Publications (2023 tr. Toraj Hori).

== Style and themes ==
Allen's literary approach is characterised by fragmented narratives, metafictional techniques, "targeted irreverence", and a "radically intertextual" narrative style. It interrogates institutional structures, especially those of education by enacting what David Vichnar has called "a pedagogy of failure":

[Allen's work] foregrounds uncertainty, digression, fragmentation, and the impossibility of closure. In so doing, Allen liberates critique from the authority it often presumes, rewiring it as lived, embodied, and self‑questioning: a critique that teaches through collapse... His texts sidestep the expectation that philosophical discourse be coherent, linear, or authoritative. Instead, they teach through artful disintegration, ambiguous gestures, and the construction of ruin. As both theorist and writer, Allen offers a pedagogy of the fragment, a critique that educates by refusing the confidence of normative knowledge.

His work is marked, too, by an attempt to push at the limits of academic writing. As Allen has described his approach:

Most writing about philosophy and theory seems to me overly restrained by the desire not to come across as an idiot, not to have forgotten this relevant text, misread this passage, or neglected a salient point. By breaking with the position of the author as authority and the scholarly habit to identify the mind of the scholar with the content of their writing, a hybrid theoretical/fictional form allows problems to manifest and unfold, often by intuition, with an element of chance...

Allen has engaged a number of key figures in literature and philosophy in his writings, including Thomas Bernhard, Antonin Artaud, Georges Bataille, and Friedrich Nietzsche.

In a 2025 interview Allen stated that when he incorporates such authors in his fictions, it is with the aim of creating a space where their "more disturbing ideas are allowed to persist and interanimate". This is to "allow the ideas themselves...to run amok to some extent...and keep them, as far as is possible, in an unresolved state".

== Reception ==
Allen's work is considered to be an example of necromodernist writing. His work has been compared to that of Samuel Beckett, Italo Calvino, and Jorge Luis Borges, as well as a range of other figures:

Allen re-ignites Beckett, Boris and Arkady Strugatsky, Orwell, Kafka, Burroughs, Conrad and Nietzsche. At the same time, Allen is none of those writers. There seems to be far more interest in losing the ego in order to make a piece of effective work. It’s quite art school, actually. In terms of critical theory, what is happening can trigger a multitude of thinkers: Freud, Derrida, Marx, Lyotard, Foucault, Agamben. Simultaneously, it feels unaligned. It is philosophy or critical theory as strategic art.

Allen's novels have been considered "reminiscent of the work of Lars Iyer, although while Iyer's novels take the form of quasi-Platonic dialogues in which the characters talk about philosophical ideas, Allen's seem more like parables or fables".

His more experimental writing has been described by Simon Palfrey as "like listening to the insomnia of Hamlet", and by Eugen Bacon as "exquisitely weird".

== Bibliography ==
- The Unteachable (2026)
- The Tongue Machine (2026)
- Midden Hill (2025)
- Jonathan Martin (2025)
- The Faces of Pluto (2024)
- Black Vellum (2023)
- The Wake and the Manuscript (2022)
- Plague Theatre (2022)
- Burton's Anatomy (2022)
- The Reading Room (2021)
- The Reaches (2021)
- The Sick List (2021)
- Wretch (2020)
- Cynicism (2020)
- The Cynical Educator (2017)
- Education and Philosophy: An Introduction (2017) with Roy Goddard
- Benign Violence: Education in and beyond the Age of Reason (2014)

== See also ==
- Experimental literature
- Metafiction
- Intertextuality
- Cynicism (philosophy)
- Cynicism (contemporary)
