= Theatre Alfred Jarry =

Theatre founded in January 1926 by Antonin Artaud, Robert Aron and Roger Vitrac in France

- Le Théâtre Alfred-Jarry
- Formation: January, 1926
- Founders: Antonin Artaud, Robert Aron, and Roger Vitrac
- Dissolved: July, 1929
- Type: Theatre companies
- Purpose: Publication and performance of works associated with Surrealism, Theatre of the Absurd and Theatre of Cruelty
- Location: Paris, France
- Key people: Antonin Artaud, Robert Aron, Roger Vitrac, Rene Allendy, Yvonne Allendy

The Theatre Alfred Jarry was founded in January 1926 by Antonin Artaud with Robert Aron and Roger Vitrac, in Paris, France. It was influenced by Surrealism, Theatre of the Absurd and the work of Alfred Jarry. It was foundational to Artaud's theory of the Theatre of Cruelty. Though short-lived, productions were attended by an enormous range of European artists, including Arthur Adamov, André Gide, and Paul Valéry.^{:249}

== Foundation ==
The theatre was a "collaborative project" between Antonin Artaud, Robert Aron and Roger Vitrac that "emerged from [their] collective interests."^{:77} They named the theatre after Alfred Jarry, "a key figure in the French avant-garde known for his aggressive and biting satire of bourgeois social mores", best known for his play Ubu Roi.^{:77}

== Productions ==
Locations of theaters where productions by The Theatre of Alfred Jarry were staged.

Between June 1927 and January 1929, the Theatre Alfred Jarry staged seven productions over four seasons.^{:77} They did not have a regular space or company, which changed depending on what was available.^{:78}

The theatre advertised that they would produce Artaud's play Jet de sang in their 1926–1927 season, but it was never mounted and was not premiered until 40 years later.

=== Season 1 ===
- Théâtre de Grenelle (1 - 2 June, 1927)^{:33}
  - Antonin Artaud's Ventre brûlé; ou La Mère folle (Burnt Belly, or the Mad Mother)
    - Maxime Jacob (Musical Composition)
    - Edmond Beauchamp (Le Roi)
    - René Bruyez (Prédestine de l'Opium)
    - Max Joly (Doux Forniente)
    - Laurent Zacharie (Mystére d'Hollywood)
    - Yvonne Vibert (La Reine)^{:254}
  - Robert Aron's Gigogne
    - René Lefèvre (Gigogne)
    - Geymond Vital (Le vieux domestique)
    - Yvonne Vibert (La Nourrice)
    - Edmond Beuchamp (Le Fils légitime)
    - Max Joly, Ulric Straram, Laurent Zacharie, René Bruyez (Les Bâtards)^{:254}
  - Roger Vitrac's Les Mystères de l’amour (The Mysteries of Love)

=== Season 2 ===
- Comédie des Champs-Élysées (14 January 1928)^{:34}
  - Vsevolod Pudovkin's Mother (1926)
  - Act III of Paul Claudel's Le Partage de midi
    - Génica Athanasiou, Ysé ^{:256}

=== Season 3 ===
- Théâtre de L'Avenue, (2 & 9 June, 1928)^{:33}
  - August Strindberg's A Dream Play
    - Antonin Artaud (Theology)
    - Tania Balachova (Indra's Daughter/Agnes)
    - Auguste Boverio (The Poet)
    - Étienne Decroux (The Quarantine Master)
    - Raymond Rouleau (The Officer)
    - Yvonne Save (Mother/Caretaker)
    - Edmond Beauchamp
    - Maxime Fabert
    - Ghita Luchaire
    - Ulric Straram
    - Laurent Zacharie

=== Season 4 ===
- Comédie des Champs-Élysées (24 & 29 December, 1928, & 5 January 1929)^{:34}
  - Roger Vitrac's Victor, ou Les Enfants au pouvoir
    - Marc Darnault (the boy)

== Notable Members ==
- Antonin Artaud - Founder, writer and creative director.
- Robert Aron - Founder, producer for first three seasons.
- Roger Vitrac - Founder and writer.
- Yvonne Allendy - Treasurer. Madame Allendy also took up the role of the creation of promotional materials, such as posters and invitations.
- René Allendy - Investor. Monsieur Allendy was a friend of Artaud, and took interest in his work. Allendy and his wife raised 3,000 francs as an initial investment for its first season.

== Actors ==
The following actors performed at TAJ:^{:43}

- Genica Athanasiou
- Tania Balachova
- Edmond Beauchamp
- Andre Berley
- Jeanne Bernard
- Domenica Blazy
- Auguste Boverio
- René Bruyez
- Henri Cremieux
- Max Dalban
- Dalle
- Marc Darnault
- Etienne Decroux
- Maxime Fabert
- Edith Farnese Gilles
- Jacqueline Hopstein
- Max Joly
- Elizabeth Lannay
- René Lefèvre
- Robert Le Flon
- Ghita Luchaire
- Jean Mamy
- Germaine Ozier
- Alexandra Pecker
- Raymond Rouleau
- Sarantidis
- Yvonne Save
- Ulric Straram
- Yvonne Vibert
- Geymond Vital
- De Vos
- Laurent Zacharie
