= Theatre of the absurd =

Theatrical genre since the 1950s

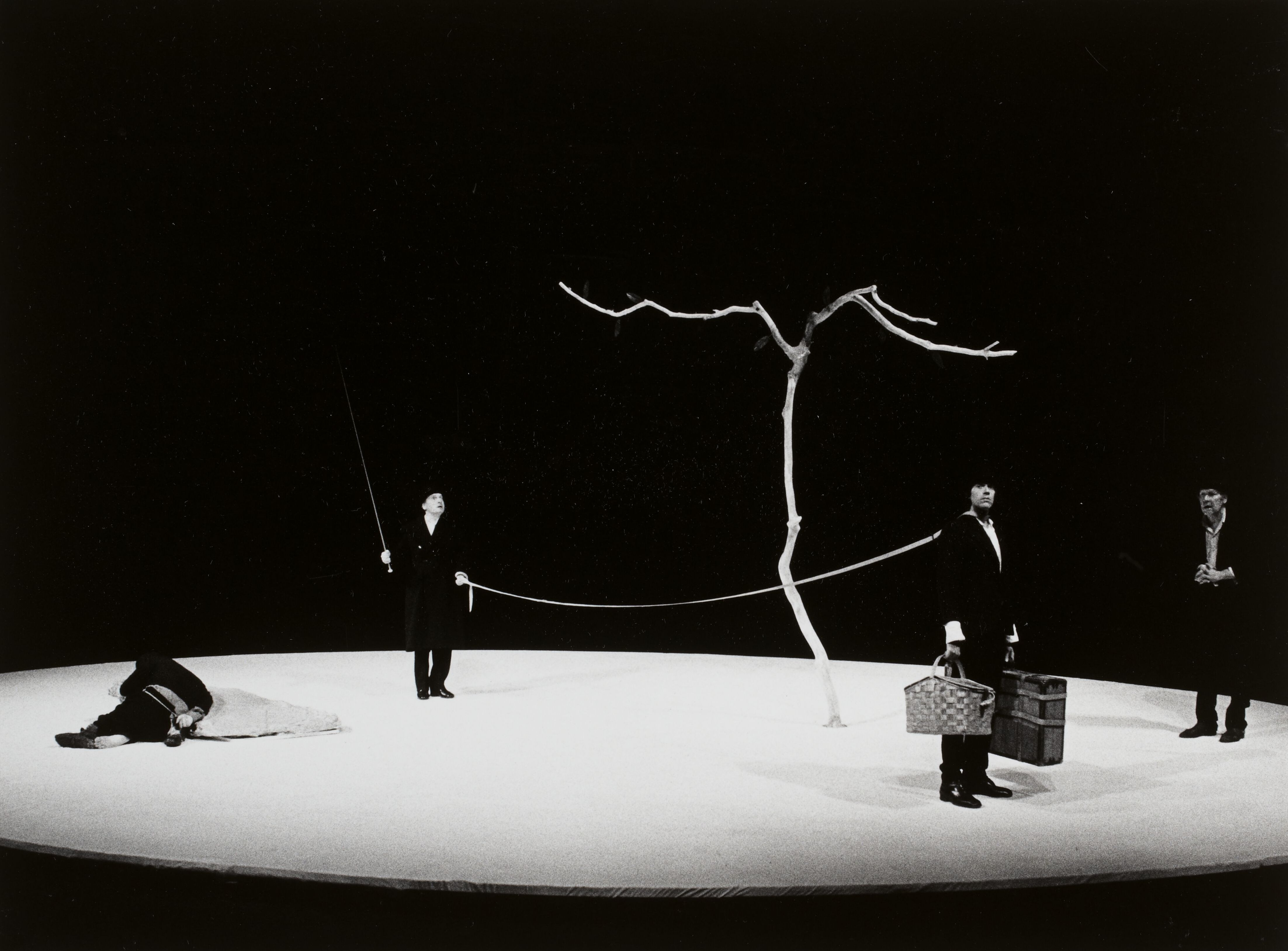
Waiting for Godot, a herald for the theatre of the absurd. Festival d'Avignon, dir. Otomar Krejča, 1978.

The theatre of the absurd (French: théâtre de l'absurde [teatʁ(ə) də lapsyʁd]) is a post–World War II designation for particular plays of absurdist fiction written by a number of primarily European playwrights in the late 1950s. It is also a term for the style of theatre the plays represent. The plays focus largely on ideas of existentialism and express what happens when human existence lacks meaning or purpose and communication breaks down. The structure of the plays is typically a round shape, with the finishing point the same as the starting point. Logical construction and argument give way to irrational and illogical speech and to the ultimate conclusion—silence.

== Origin ==
Critic Martin Esslin coined the term in his 1960 essay "The Theatre of the Absurd", which begins by focusing on the playwrights Samuel Beckett, Arthur Adamov, and Eugène Ionesco. Esslin says that their plays have a common denominator—the "absurd", a word that Esslin defines with a quotation from Ionesco: "absurd is that which has no purpose, or goal, or objective." The French philosopher Albert Camus, in his 1942 work The Myth of Sisyphus, describes the human situation as meaningless and absurd.

The absurd in these plays takes the form of man's reaction to a world apparently without meaning, or man as a puppet controlled or menaced by invisible outside forces. This style of writing was first popularized by the Eugène Ionesco play The Bald Soprano (1950). Although the term is applied to a wide range of plays, some characteristics coincide in many of the plays: broad comedy, often similar to vaudeville, mixed with horrific or tragic images; characters caught in hopeless situations forced to do repetitive or meaningless actions; dialogue full of clichés, wordplay, and nonsense; plots that are cyclical or absurdly expansive; either a parody or dismissal of realism and the concept of the "well-made play".

In his introduction to the book Absurd Drama (1965), Esslin wrote:

The Theatre of the Absurd attacks the comfortable certainties of religious or political orthodoxy. It aims to shock its audience out of complacency, to bring it face to face with the harsh facts of the human situation as these writers see it. But the challenge behind this message is anything but one of despair. It is a challenge to accept the human condition as it is, in all its mystery and absurdity, and to bear it with dignity, nobly, responsibly; precisely because there are no easy solutions to the mysteries of existence, because ultimately man is alone in a meaningless world. The shedding of easy solutions, of comforting illusions, may be painful, but it leaves behind it a sense of freedom and relief. And that is why, in the last resort, the Theatre of the Absurd does not provoke tears of despair but the laughter of liberation.

== Etymology ==
In the first edition of "The Theatre of the Absurd", Esslin quotes the French philosopher Albert Camus's essay "The Myth of Sisyphus", as it uses the word "absurdity" to describe the human situation: "In a universe that is suddenly deprived of illusions and of light, man feels a stranger. … This divorce between man and his life, the actor and his setting, truly constitutes the feeling of Absurdity."

Esslin presents the four defining playwrights of the movement as Samuel Beckett, Arthur Adamov, Eugène Ionesco, and Jean Genet, and in subsequent editions he added a fifth playwright, Harold Pinter. Other writers associated with this group by Esslin and other critics include Tom Stoppard, Friedrich Dürrenmatt, Fernando Arrabal, Edward Albee, Boris Vian, and Jean Tardieu.

== Precursors ==
=== Tragicomedy ===
The mode of most "absurdist" plays is tragicomedy. As Nell says in Endgame, "Nothing is funnier than unhappiness … it's the most comical thing in the world". Esslin cites William Shakespeare as an influence on this aspect of the "absurd drama". Shakespeare's influence is acknowledged directly in the titles of Ionesco's Macbett and Stoppard's Rosencrantz and Guildenstern Are Dead. Friedrich Dürrenmatt says in his essay "Problems of the Theatre", "Comedy alone is suitable for us … But the tragic is still possible even if pure tragedy is not. We can achieve the tragic out of comedy. We can bring it forth as a frightening moment, as an abyss that opens suddenly; indeed, many of Shakespeare's tragedies are already really comedies out of which the tragic arises."

Though layered with a significant amount of tragedy, theatre of the absurd echoes other great forms of comedic performance, according to Esslin, from Commedia dell'arte to vaudeville. Similarly, Esslin cites early film comedians and music hall artists such as Charlie Chaplin, the Keystone Cops and Buster Keaton as direct influences. (Keaton even starred in Beckett's Film in 1965.)

=== Formal experimentation ===
As an experimental form of theatre, many theatre of the absurd playwrights employ techniques borrowed from earlier innovators. Writers and techniques frequently mentioned in relation to the theatre of the absurd include the 19th-century nonsense poets, such as Lewis Carroll or Edward Lear; Polish playwright Stanisław Ignacy Witkiewicz; the Russians Daniil Kharms, Nikolai Erdman, and others; Bertolt Brecht's distancing techniques in his "epic theatre"; and the "dream plays" of August Strindberg.

One commonly cited precursor is Luigi Pirandello, especially Six Characters in Search of an Author. Pirandello was a highly regarded theatrical experimentalist who wanted to bring down the fourth wall presupposed by the realism of playwrights such as Henrik Ibsen. According to W. B. Worthen, Six Characters and other Pirandello plays use "metatheatre—roleplaying, plays-within-plays, and a flexible sense of the limits of stage and illusion—to examine a highly-theatricalized vision of identity".

Another influential playwright was Guillaume Apollinaire whose The Breasts of Tiresias was the first work to be called "surreal".

=== Pataphysics, surrealism, and Dadaism ===
A precursor is Alfred Jarry whose Ubu plays scandalized Paris in the 1890s. Likewise, the concept of 'pataphysics—"the science of imaginary solutions"—first presented in Jarry's Gestes et opinions du docteur Faustroll, pataphysicien (Exploits and Opinions of Dr. Faustroll, pataphysician) was inspirational to many later absurdists, some of whom joined the Collège de 'pataphysique, founded in honor of Jarry in 1948 (Ionesco, Arrabal, and Vian were given the title "transcendent satrape of the Collège de 'pataphysique"). The Theatre Alfred Jarry, founded by Antonin Artaud and Roger Vitrac, housed several absurdist plays, including ones by Ionesco and Adamov.

In the 1860s, a gaucho author established himself as a precursor of the theater of the absurd in Brazilian lands. Qorpo-Santo, pseudonym of José Joaquim de Campos Leão, released during the last years of his life several theatrical works that can be classified as precursors of the theater of the absurd. However, he is little known, even in his homeland, but works such as "Mateus e Mateusa" are gradually being rediscovered by scholars in Brazil and around the world.

Artaud's "Theatre of Cruelty" (presented in Theatre and its Double) was a particularly important philosophical treatise. Artaud claimed theatre's reliance on literature was inadequate and that the true power of theatre was in its visceral impact. Artaud was a surrealist, and many other members of the surrealist group were significant influences on the absurdists.

Absurdism is also frequently compared to surrealism's predecessor, Dadaism (for example, the Dadaist plays by Tristan Tzara performed at the Cabaret Voltaire in Zürich). Many of the absurdists had direct connections with the Dadaists and surrealists. Ionesco, Adamov, and Arrabal for example, were friends with surrealists still living in Paris at the time including Paul Eluard and André Breton, the founder of surrealism, and Beckett translated many surrealist poems by Breton and others from French into English.

=== Relationship with existentialism ===
Many of the absurdists were contemporaries with Jean-Paul Sartre, the philosophical spokesman for existentialism in Paris, but few absurdists actually committed to Sartre's own existentialist philosophy, as expressed in Being and Nothingness, and many of the absurdists had a complicated relationship with him. Sartre praised Genet's plays, stating that for Genet, "Good is only an illusion. Evil is a Nothingness which arises upon the ruins of Good".

Ionesco, however, hated Sartre bitterly. Ionesco accused Sartre of supporting communism but ignoring the atrocities committed by communists; he wrote Rhinoceros as a criticism of blind conformity, whether it be to Nazism or communism; at the end of the play, one man remains on Earth resisting transformation into a rhinoceros. Sartre criticized Rhinoceros by questioning: "Why is there one man who resists? At least we could learn why, but no, we learn not even that. He resists because he is there." Sartre's criticism highlights a primary difference between the theatre of the absurd and existentialism: the theatre of the absurd shows the failure of man without recommending a solution. In a 1966 interview, Claude Bonnefoy, comparing the absurdists to Sartre and Camus, said to Ionesco, "It seems to me that Beckett, Adamov and yourself started out less from philosophical reflections or a return to classical sources, than from first-hand experience and a desire to find a new theatrical expression that would enable you to render this experience in all its acuteness and also its immediacy. If Sartre and Camus thought out these themes, you expressed them in a far more vital contemporary fashion." Ionesco replied, "I have the feeling that these writers – who are serious and important – were talking about absurdity and death, but that they never really lived these themes, that they did not feel them within themselves in an almost irrational, visceral way, that all this was not deeply inscribed in their language. With them it was still rhetoric, eloquence. With Adamov and Beckett it really is a very naked reality that is conveyed through the apparent dislocation of language."

In comparison to Sartre's concepts of the function of literature, Beckett's primary focus was on the failure of man to overcome "absurdity" - or the repetition of life even though the end result will be the same no matter what and everything is essentially pointless - as James Knowlson says in Damned to Fame, Beckett's work focuses, "on poverty, failure, exile and loss — as he put it, on man as a 'non-knower' and as a 'non-can-er' ." Beckett's own relationship with Sartre was complicated by a mistake made in the publication of one of his stories in Sartre's journal Les Temps Modernes. Beckett said, though he liked Nausea, he generally found the writing style of Sartre and Heidegger to be "too philosophical" and he considered himself "not a philosopher".

Later scholars have complicated the relationship between the Theatre of the Absurd and existentialism. Yael Zarhy-Levo argues that Martin Esslin's category helped shape the movement by grouping certain playwrights and formal features under a shared label. Her work suggests that the term influenced how absurdist theatre was organized and understood within theatre history. Carl Lavery and Clare Finburgh have reread absurdist theatre through ecology and the environment, emphasizing postwar instability and the decentering of the human subject. Their interpretation shifts discussion of absurdism beyond existential meaninglessness alone toward environmental anxiety, material instability, and changing ideas about humanity's place within the world. This shift suggests that absurdist theatre is not simply a response to philosophical ideas about meaninglessness. It has also been understood in relation to historical crisis, changing cultural conditions, and evolving critical approaches. In this sense, the Theatre of the Absurd has continued to invite new interpretations over time.

Other critics have interpreted absurdist theatre through political and cross-cultural frameworks. Amina ElHalawani reads Beckett’s influence on Egyptian drama as evidence that absurdist theatre could also function as a vehicle for political critique. Linda Saborio has argued that absurdist techniques were also reworked in Mexican feminist theatre, broadening the tradition beyond the male European canon usually associated with Esslin. Such interpretations indicate that the Theatre of the Absurd has not remained limited to its earliest critical formulations. They also show that the movement has continued to be reexamined through different social, historical, and theatrical perspectives.These readings have also widened the movement’s critical scope beyond existential philosophy. Together, these later interpretations suggest that the Theatre of the Absurd has continued to develop beyond its early philosophical associations and has remained adaptable across different historical, political, and cultural contexts.

== History ==
The "absurd" or "new theater" movement was originally a Paris-based (and a Rive Gauche) avant-garde phenomenon tied to extremely small theatres in the Quartier Latin. Some of the absurdists, such as Jean Genet, Jean Tardieu, and Boris Vian., were born in France. Many other absurdists were born elsewhere but lived in France, writing often in French: Beckett from Ireland; Ionesco from Romania; Arthur Adamov from Russia; Alejandro Jodorowsky from Chile and Fernando Arrabal from Spain. As the influence of the absurdists grew, the style spread to other countries—with playwrights either directly influenced by absurdists in Paris or playwrights labelled absurdist by critics. In England, some of those whom Esslin considered practitioners of the theatre of the absurd include Harold Pinter, Tom Stoppard, N. F. Simpson, James Saunders, and David Campton; in the United States, Edward Albee, Sam Shepard, Jack Gelber, and John Guare; in Poland, Tadeusz Różewicz; Sławomir Mrożek, and Tadeusz Kantor; in Italy, Dino Buzzati; and in Germany, Peter Weiss, Wolfgang Hildesheimer, and Günter Grass. In India, both Mohit Chattopadhyay and Mahesh Elkunchwar have also been labeled absurdists. Other international absurdist playwrights include Tawfiq el-Hakim from Egypt; Hanoch Levin from Israel; Miguel Mihura from Spain; José de Almada Negreiros from Portugal; Mikhail Volokhov from Russia; Yordan Radichkov from Bulgaria; and playwright and former Czech president Václav Havel.

=== Major productions ===
- Genet's The Maids (Les Bonnes) premiered in 1947.
- Ionesco's The Bald Soprano (La Cantatrice Chauve) was first performed on May 11, 1950, at the Théâtre des Noctambules. Ionesco followed this with The Lesson (La Leçon) in 1951 and The Chairs (Les Chaises) in 1952.
- Beckett's Waiting for Godot was first performed on 5 January 1953 at the Théâtre de Babylone in Paris.
- In 1957, Genet's The Balcony (Le Balcon) was produced in London at the Arts Theatre.
- That May, Harold Pinter's The Room was presented at the Drama Studio at the University of Bristol. Pinter's The Birthday Party premiered in the West End in 1958.
- Albee's The Zoo Story premiered in West Berlin at the Schiller Theater Werkstatt in 1959.
- On October 28, 1959, Krapp's Last Tape by Beckett was first performed at the Royal Court Theatre in London.
- Arrabal's Picnic on the Battlefield (Pique-nique en campagne) came out in 1958.
- Genet's The Blacks (Les Nègres) was published that year but was first performed at the Théatre de Lutèce in Paris on 28 October 1959.
- 1959 also saw the completion of Ionesco's Rhinoceros which premiered in Paris in January 1960 at the Odeon.
- Beckett's Happy Days was first performed at the Cherry Lane Theatre in New York on 17 September 1961.
- Albee's Who's Afraid of Virginia Woolf? also premiered in New York the following year, on October 13.
- Pinter's The Homecoming premiered in London in June 1965 at the Aldwych Theatre.
- Weiss's Marat/Sade (The Persecution and Assassination of Jean-Paul Marat as Performed by the Inmates of the Asylum of Charenton Under the Direction of the Marquis de Sade) was first performed in West Berlin in 1964 and in New York City a year later.
- Stoppard's Rosencrantz & Guildenstern Are Dead premiered at the Edinburgh Festival Fringe in 1966.
- Arrabal's Automobile Graveyard (Le Cimetière des voitures) was first performed in 1966.
- Lebanese author Issam Mahfouz's play The Dictator premiered in Beirut in 1969.
- Beckett's Catastrophe—dedicated to then-imprisoned Czech dissident playwright Václav Havel, who became president of Czechoslovakia after the 1989 Velvet Revolution—was first performed at the Avignon Festival on July 21, 1982. The film version (Beckett on Film, 2001) was directed by David Mamet and performed by Pinter, Sir John Gielgud, and Rebecca Pidgeon.

== Theatrical features ==
Plays within this group are absurd in that they focus not on logical acts, realistic occurrences, or traditional character development; they, instead, focus on human beings trapped in an incomprehensible world subject to any occurrence, no matter how illogical. The theme of incomprehensibility is coupled with the inadequacy of language to form meaningful human connections. According to Martin Esslin, absurdism is "the inevitable devaluation of ideals, purity, and purpose" Absurdist drama asks its viewer to "draw his own conclusions, make his own errors". Though Theatre of the Absurd may be seen as nonsense, they have something to say and can be understood". Esslin makes a distinction between the dictionary definition of absurd ("out of harmony" in the musical sense) and drama's understanding of the absurd: "Absurd is that which is devoid of purpose... Cut off from his religious, metaphysical, and transcendental roots, man is lost; all his actions become senseless, absurd, useless."

=== Characters ===
The characters in absurdist drama are lost and floating in an incomprehensible universe and they abandon rational devices and discursive thought because these approaches are inadequate. Many characters appear as automatons stuck in routines speaking only in cliché (Ionesco called the Old Man and Old Woman in The Chairs "übermarionettes"). Characters are frequently stereotypical, archetypal, or flat character types as in Commedia dell'arte.

The more complex characters are in crisis because the world around them is incomprehensible. Many of Pinter's plays, for example, feature characters trapped in an enclosed space menaced by some force the character cannot understand. Pinter's first play was The Room – in which the main character, Rose, is menaced by Riley who invades her safe space though the actual source of menace remains a mystery. In Friedrich Dürrenmatt's The Visit, the main character, Alfred, is menaced by Claire Zachanassian; Claire, richest woman in the world, with a decaying body and multiple husbands throughout the play, has guaranteed a payout for anyone in the town willing to kill Alfred. Characters in absurdist drama may also face the chaos of a world that science and logic have abandoned. Ionesco's recurring character Berenger, for example, faces a killer without motivation in The Killer, and Berenger's logical arguments fail to convince the killer that killing is wrong. In Rhinocéros, Berenger remains the only human on Earth who has not turned into a rhinoceros and must decide whether or not to conform. Characters may find themselves trapped in a routine, or in a metafictional conceit, trapped in a story; the title characters in Stoppard's Rosencrantz & Guildenstern Are Dead, for example, find themselves in a story (Hamlet) in which the outcome has already been written.

The plots of many absurdist plays feature characters in interdependent pairs, commonly either two males or a male and a female. Some Beckett scholars call this the "pseudocouple". The two characters may be roughly equal or have a begrudging interdependence (like Vladimir and Estragon in Waiting for Godot or the two main characters in Rosencrantz & Guildenstern Are Dead); one character may be clearly dominant and may torture the passive character (like Pozzo and Lucky in Waiting for Godot or Hamm and Clov in Endgame); the relationship of the characters may shift dramatically throughout the play (as in Ionesco's The Lesson or in many of Albee's plays, The Zoo Story for example).

=== Language ===
Despite its reputation for nonsense language, much of the dialogue in absurdist plays is naturalistic. The moments when characters resort to nonsense language or clichés—when words appear to have lost their denotative function, thus creating misunderstanding among the characters—make the theatre of the absurd distinctive. Language frequently gains a certain phonetic, rhythmical, almost musical quality, opening up a wide range of often comedic playfulness. Tardieu, for example, in the series of short pieces Theatre de Chambre arranged the language as one arranges music. Distinctively absurdist language ranges from meaningless clichés to vaudeville-style word play to meaningless nonsense. The Bald Soprano, for example, was inspired by a language book in which characters would exchange empty clichés that never ultimately amounted to true communication or true connection. Likewise, the characters in The Bald Soprano—like many other absurdist characters—go through routine dialogue full of clichés without actually communicating anything substantive or making a human connection. In other cases, the dialogue is purposefully elliptical; the language of absurdist theater becomes secondary to the poetry of the concrete and objectified images of the stage. Many of Beckett's plays devalue language for the sake of the striking tableau. Harold Pinter—famous for his "Pinter pause"—presents more subtly elliptical dialogue; often the primary things characters should address are replaced by ellipsis or dashes. The following exchange between Aston and Davies in The Caretaker is typical of Pinter:

Aston: More or less exactly what you...
Davies: That's it … that's what I'm getting at is … I mean, what sort of jobs … (Pause.)
Aston: Well, there's things like the stairs … and the … the bells …
Davies: But it'd be a matter … wouldn't it … it'd be a matter of a broom … isn't it?

Much of the dialogue in absurdist drama (especially in Beckett's and Albee's plays) reflects this kind of evasiveness and inability to make a connection. When language that is apparently nonsensical appears, it also demonstrates this disconnection. It can be used for comic effect, as in Lucky's long speech in Godot when Pozzo says Lucky is demonstrating a talent for "thinking" as other characters comically attempt to stop him:

Lucky: Given the existence as uttered forth in the public works of Puncher and Wattmann of a personal God quaquaquaqua with white beard quaquaquaqua outside time without extension who from the heights of divine apathia divine athambia divine aphasia loves us dearly with some exceptions for reasons unknown but time will tell and suffers like the divine Miranda with those who for reasons unknown but time will tell are plunged in torment...

Nonsense may also be used abusively, as in Pinter's The Birthday Party when Goldberg and McCann torture Stanley with apparently nonsensical questions and non-sequiturs:

Goldberg: What do you use for pajamas?
Stanley: Nothing.
Goldberg: You verminate the sheet of your birth.
Mccann: What about the Albigensenist heresy?
Goldberg: Who watered the wicket in Melbourne?
Mccann: What about the blessed Oliver Plunkett?
Goldberg: Speak up Webber. Why did the chicken cross the road?

As in the above examples, nonsense in absurdist theatre may be also used to demonstrate the limits of language while questioning or parodying the determinism of science and the knowability of truth. In Ionesco's The Lesson, a professor tries to force a pupil to understand his nonsensical philology lesson:

Professor: … In Spanish: the roses of my grandmother are as yellow as my grandfather who is Asiatic; in Latin: the roses of my grandmother are as yellow as my grandfather who is Asiatic. Do you detect the difference? Translate this into … Romanian
Pupil: The … how do you say "roses" in Romanian?
Professor: But "roses", what else? … "roses" is a translation in Oriental of the French word "roses", in Spanish "roses", do you get it? In Sardanapali, "roses"...

=== Plot ===
Traditional plot structures are rarely a consideration in the theatre of the absurd. Plots can consist of the absurd repetition of cliché and routine, as in Godot or The Bald Soprano. Often there is a menacing outside force that remains a mystery; in The Birthday Party, for example, Goldberg and McCann confront Stanley, torture him with absurd questions, and drag him off at the end, but it is never revealed why. In later Pinter plays, such as The Caretaker and The Homecoming, the menace is no longer entering from the outside but exists within the confined space. Other absurdists use this kind of plot, as in Albee's A Delicate Balance: Harry and Edna take refuge at the home of their friends, Agnes and Tobias, because they suddenly become frightened. They have difficulty explaining what has frightened them:

Harry: There was nothing … but we were very scared.
Edna: We … were … terrified.
Harry: We were scared. It was like being lost: very young again, with the dark, and lost. There was no … thing … to be … frightened of, but …
Edna: We were frightened … and there was nothing.

Absence, emptiness, nothingness, and unresolved mysteries are central features in many absurdist plots: for example, in The Chairs, an old couple welcomes a large number of guests to their home, but these guests are invisible, so all we see are empty chairs, a representation of their absence. Likewise, the action of Godot is centered around the absence of a man named Godot, for whom the characters perpetually wait. In many of Beckett's later plays, most features are stripped away and what's left is a minimalistic tableau: a woman walking slowly back and forth in Footfalls, for example, or in Breath only a junk heap on stage and the sounds of breathing.

The plot may also revolve around an unexplained metamorphosis, a supernatural change, or a shift in the laws of physics. For example, in Ionesco's Amédée, or How to Get Rid of It, a couple must deal with a corpse that is steadily growing larger and larger; Ionesco never fully reveals the identity of the corpse, how this person died, or why it is continually growing, but the corpse ultimately – and, again, without explanation – floats away. In Tardieu's "The Keyhole" a lover watches a woman through a keyhole as she removes her clothes and then her flesh.

Like Pirandello, many absurdists use meta-theatrical techniques to explore role fulfillment, fate, and the theatricality of theatre. This is true for many of Genet's plays: for example, in The Maids, two maids pretend to be their mistress; in The Balcony brothel patrons take on elevated positions in role-playing games, but the line between theatre and reality starts to blur. Another complex example of this is Rosencrantz and Guildenstern are Dead: it is a play about two minor characters in Hamlet; these characters, in turn, have various encounters with the players who perform The Mousetrap, the play-within-the-play in Hamlet. In Stoppard's Travesties, James Joyce and Tristan Tzara slip in and out of the plot of The Importance of Being Earnest.

Plots are frequently cyclical: for example, Endgame begins where the play ended – at the beginning of the play, Clov says, "Finished, it's finished, nearly finished, it must be nearly finished" – and themes of cycle, routine, and repetition are explored throughout.
