= Qorpo-Santo =

José Joaquim de Campos Leão, also known as Qorpo-Santo (Triunfo, April 19, 1829 - Porto Alegre May 1, 1883), was a Brazilian journalist and playwright. He is known to have written the very first absurdist theatre plays, long before the term Theatre of the Absurd was coined. His family put him under judicial interdiction in 1861, because he was "writing down everything". As a matter of fact, just in May 1866 he wrote 8 plays, as noted by Guilhermino César. He looked for the best mental doctors in Brazil at that time and got a document telling he was sane, but the judge never took him out of the interdiction.

== Works ==
- Certa identidade em busca de outra
- Eu sou vida eu não sou morte
- Um credor da Fazenda Nacional
- As relações naturais
- Hoje sou um; e amanhã sou outro
- Um assovio
- Um parto
- Hóspede atrevido ou O brilhante escondido
- A impossibilidade da santificação ou A santificação transformada
- Dois irmãos
- A separação de dois esposos
- La
- Lanterna de fogo
- Marinheiro escritor
- Marido extremoso
- Mateus e Mateusa
- Elias e sua loucura bíblica
