= Martin Esslin =

British playwright, theatre critic and scholar (1918–2002)

Martin Julius Esslin
- Born: Julius Pereszlényi; Hungarian: Pereszlényi Gyula Márton; 6 June 1918; Budapest, Austria-Hungary
- Died: 24 February 2002 (aged 83); London, England, UK
- Education: University of Vienna; Reinhardt Seminar
- Occupations: Theatre critic; scholar
- Notable work: The Theatre of the Absurd

Martin Julius Esslin OBE (6 June 1918 – 24 February 2002) was a Hungarian-born British producer, dramatist, journalist, adaptor and translator, critic, academic scholar and professor of drama, known for coining the term "theatre of the absurd" in his 1961 book The Theatre of the Absurd. This work has been called "the most influential theatrical text of the 1960s".

== Life and work ==
Born Pereszlényi Gyula Márton in Budapest, Esslin moved to Vienna with his family at a young age. He studied Philosophy and English at the University of Vienna and later studied directing under Max Reinhardt at the Reinhardt Seminar of Dramatic Arts in 1928; actor Milo Sperber was a classmate. Of Jewish descent (but not of Jewish practice), he fled Austria in the wake of the Anschluss of 1938, moving to Brussels for a year and then moving on to England.

In his book, Theatre of the Absurd, written in 1961, he defined the "Theatre of the Absurd" as follows:

The Theatre of the Absurd strives to express its sense of the senselessness of the human condition and the inadequacy of the rational approach by the open abandonment of rational devices and discursive thought.

This attribute of "absurdity" was not accepted by many of the playwrights associated with this trend. Playwright Eugène Ionesco stated that he did not like labels. Ahmad Kamyabi Mask criticized Esslin for a purported "colonialist" quality of this title for the Avant-garde theater. However, his work inspired other playwrights such as Samuel Beckett, Arthur Adamov, Jean Genet, and Harold Pinter (as well as Ionesco).

He began working for the BBC in 1940, serving as a producer, script writer and broadcaster. He headed BBC Radio Drama from 1963–77, having previously worked for the external European Service. He was later given the position of Head of Radio Drama, in which he tried to bring to life his dream of "national theatre of the air". He and his BBC team also translated many foreign works into English during this time. After leaving the BBC he held senior academic posts at Florida State University from 1969 to 1976 and Stanford University from 1977 to 1988. In 1977, Esslin joined the Magic Theatre as the first resident dramaturg in American theatre, a position now integral to American new playhouses.

Some of the works he adapted and translated from the original German between 1967 and 1990 included many plays of Wolfgang Bauer. Original works included Theatre of the Absurd (1962), Absurd Drama (1965), Brecht: A Choice of Evils (1959), The Anatomy of Drama (1976), The Peopled Wound: The Work of Harold Pinter (1970), Artaud (1976) and The Age of Television (1981), The Field of Drama (1987), and several other essays, articles, and reviews.

In 1947, he married Renate Gerstenberg, and they worked together on many translations (some she did herself but they were published under his name in order to sell better). They had a child named Monica.

== Death and legacy ==
Esslin died in London on 24 February 2002 at the age of 83 after having suffered from Parkinson's disease. Keble College, Oxford, maintains a special collection of more than 3,000 of his personal items, including his own works and books by other prominent dramatists, and the student drama society is named after him.
