= Édouard Toulouse =

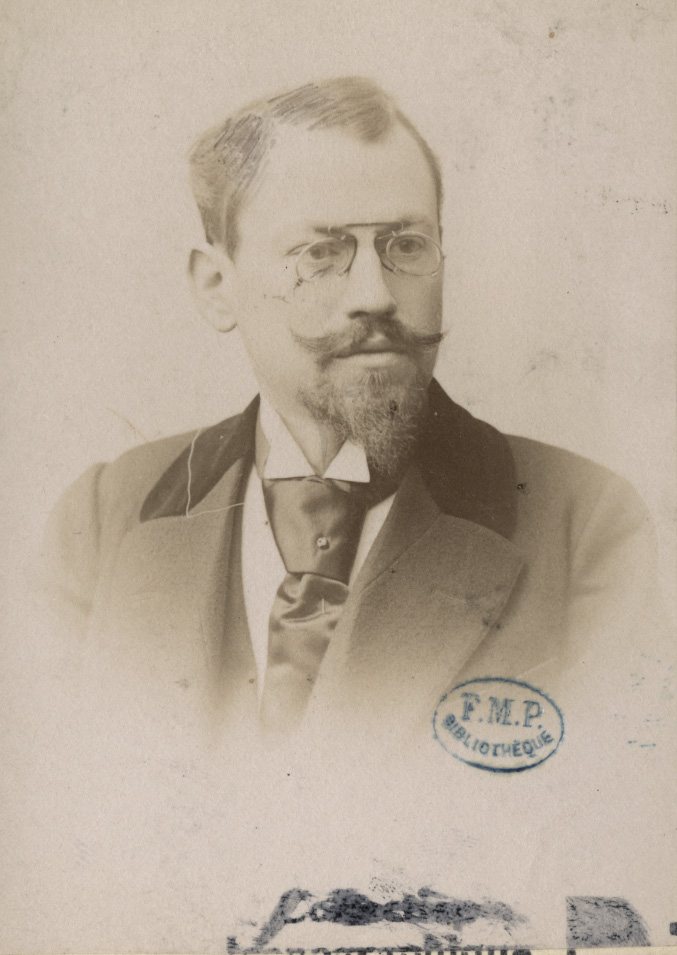
portrait. Credit: Bibliothèque interuniversitaire de santé.

Édouard Toulouse (10 December 1865 in Marseille – 19 January 1947 in Paris) was a French psychiatrist, journalist, and director of the literary magazine Demain.

== Career ==
As a young man, Toulouse worked for a number of newspapers in Marseille as a drama critic.

He later headed the Clinic for Mental Illness at the Paris Faculty.^{:14} Toulouse believed artistic creativity had an important role to play in psychological treatment. He considered himself a novelist, 'and said that he had come to science through literary activity'^{:14} In 1896 he conducted a survey of men of exceptional genius where he profiled writer Émile Zola and French luminaries to identify shared, explainable characteristics. Following this project, Toulouse was named the director of a modern clinic in the Parisian suburb of Villejuif in 1898.

In 1912 he established the fortnightly literary journal Demain, which covered a wide array of topics. A number of important figures worked on the journal, including Antonin Artaud and Jean Paulhan.

At the beginning of World War I, Toulouse conducted a survey of asylum care in France, and looked to "transform asylums of confinement into hospitals of mental health care."

He founded the League of Hygiene and Mental Prophylaxis in December 1920^{:14}
