= Ramiro Sanchiz =

Uruguayan writer, literary critic and translator

- Born: November 6, 1978 (age 47); Montevideo, Uruguay
- Occupation: Writer
- Years active: 2008 – present

Ramiro Sanchiz (born November 6, 1978) is a Uruguayan writer, literary critic and translator. He is known for the creation of "Projecto Stahl", a literary project which hopes to explore the different permutations of a universe that revolves around Federico Stahl, a character that appears in all of Sanchiz's works.

== Biography ==
Ramiro Sanchiz was born on November 6, 1978, in Montevideo. His first science fiction stories were published in science fiction and fantasy magazines and fanzines like the Uruguayan Diaspar and the Argentinian Galileo and Axxón, The first of his stories to be included in a book was "Yocasta" in El descontento y la promesa (Editorial Trilce) in 2008. The following year, Estuario Editora published Perséfone, his first novel, accompanied by a comic illustrated by Matías Bergara. Since then Sanchiz has published more than twenty books.

All of Sanchiz's narrative revolves around the character of Federico Stahl, in whom some, including the Uruguayan literary critic Alicia Torres, believe to have seen an alter ego of the author. A good part of these novels can be included in genres such as science fiction or "new weird".

== Works ==
=== Novels ===
- Perséfone (Estuario Editora, 2009)
- Vampiros porteños, sombras solitarias (Meninas Cartoneras, 2010)
- Nadie recuerda a Mlejnas (Editorial Reina Negra, 2011; Mig21 Editora, 2023)
- La vista desde el puente (Estuario Editora, 2011)
- Los viajes (Editorial Melón, 2012)
- Trashpunk (Ediciones del CEC, 2012; Mig21 Editora, 2021)
- Ficción para un imperio (Editorial Milena Caserola, 2014)
- El orden del mundo (Editorial El Cuervo, 2014; Editorial Fin de Siglo, 2017)
- El gato y la entropía #12 & 35 (Estuario Editora, 2015)
- Dos crímenes por página (Suburbano Ediciones, 2016)
- Verde (Editorial Fin de Siglo, 2016; Editorial Indómita Luz, 2023)
- Las imitaciones (Décima Editora, 2016; Ediciones Vestigio, 2019)
- La expansión del universo (Literatura Random House, 2018)
- Guitarra negra (Estuario Editora, 2019)
- Un pianista de provincias (Random House, 2022)
- Ahab (Editorial Pan, 2022)
- La anomalía 17 (Libros del Cosmonauta, 2023)
- Krautrock (Pez en el hielo, 2023)
- La historia de la ciencia ficción uruguaya (Mig21 Editora, 2025)
- Los acontecimientos (Fondo de Cultura Económica, 2025)
- Somalia (Libros del Cosmonauta, 2025)
- Las dimensiones de la celda (Contramar, 2026)
- La colisión (Vestigio, 2023)

=== Stories ===
- Del otro lado (La Propia Cartonera, 2010)
- Algunos de los otros (Editorial Trilce, 2010)
- Algunos de los otros redux (Editorial Reina Negra, 2012)
- Los otros libros (La Propia Cartonera, 2012)
- El día de la ballena (Mig21 Editora, 2023)
- Le jour de la baleine (L'atinoir, 2024)

=== Essays ===
- Caída libre (Estuario Editora, 2017)
- David Bowie: posthumanismo sónico (Editorial Holobionte, 2020)
- Matrix Acelerada (Editorial Holobionte, 2022)
- Ejercicios de dactilografía (Pez en el Hielo, 2022)
- Blackstar de Bowie (Biblioteca de Chilenia, 2025)

=== Translations ===
- Fanged Noumena vol.1, Nick Land (Editorial Holobionte, 2019)
- Hackear a Coyote, Alan Mills (Ediciones Vestigio, 2021)
- Teleoplexia, Nick Land (Editorial Holobionte, 2021)
- Texto entraña, Mike Corrao (Ediciones Vestigio, 2022. Con Diego Cepeda y Rodrigo Bastidas)
- Peckinpah, D. Harlan Wilson (Ediciones Vestigio, 22. Con Diego Cepeda)

== Recognition ==
- Mention of La vista desde el puente in the National Literature Prize (Uruguay), 2013
- First National Literature Prize (Uruguay) for El orden del mundo, 2016
- Mention of Verde in the National Literature Prize (Uruguay), 2018
- Mention of La expansión del universo in the National Literature Prize (Uruguay), 2020
