= Theatre of Cruelty =

Form of theatre by Antonin Artaud

The Theatre of Cruelty (French: Théâtre de la Cruauté, also Théâtre cruel) is a form of theatre conceptualised by Antonin Artaud. Artaud, who was briefly a member of the surrealist movement, outlined his theories in a series of essays and letters, which were collected as The Theatre and Its Double. The Theatre of Cruelty can be seen as a break from traditional Western theatre and a means by which artists assault the senses of the audience. Artaud's works have been highly influential on artists including Jean Genet, Jerzy Grotowski, Peter Brook, and Romeo Castellucci.

== History and influences ==
Antonin Artaud was well known as an actor, playwright, and essayist who worked in both theatre and cinema.

He was briefly a member of the surrealist movement in Paris from 1924 to 1926, before his "radical independence and his uncontrollable personality, perpetually in revolt, brought about his excommunication by André Breton." Led by André Breton, the surrealist movement argued that the unconscious mind is a source of artistic truth and the artistic works associated with the movement looked to reveal the mind's inner workings. Though only momentarily an official member of the group, he was associated with its members throughout his life time and the movement's theories shaped Artaud's development of the Theatre of Cruelty.

In 1926, in association with expelled surrealist playwright Roger Vitrac, Artaud founded the Theatre Alfred Jarry. He directed all of the productions at the theatre, and explored many of the ideas that he would later articulate in his writings on the Theatre of Cruelty. The theatre lasted only two years.

In 1931, Artaud saw a Balinese dance troupe performance at the Paris Colonial Exhibit. The performance conventions of Balinese dance were different from any Artaud had previously experienced, and he was struck by the intense physicality of the dancers. Artaud went on to publish his major work on the Theatre of Cruelty, The Theatre and Its Double, seven years later in 1938.

== Theory ==
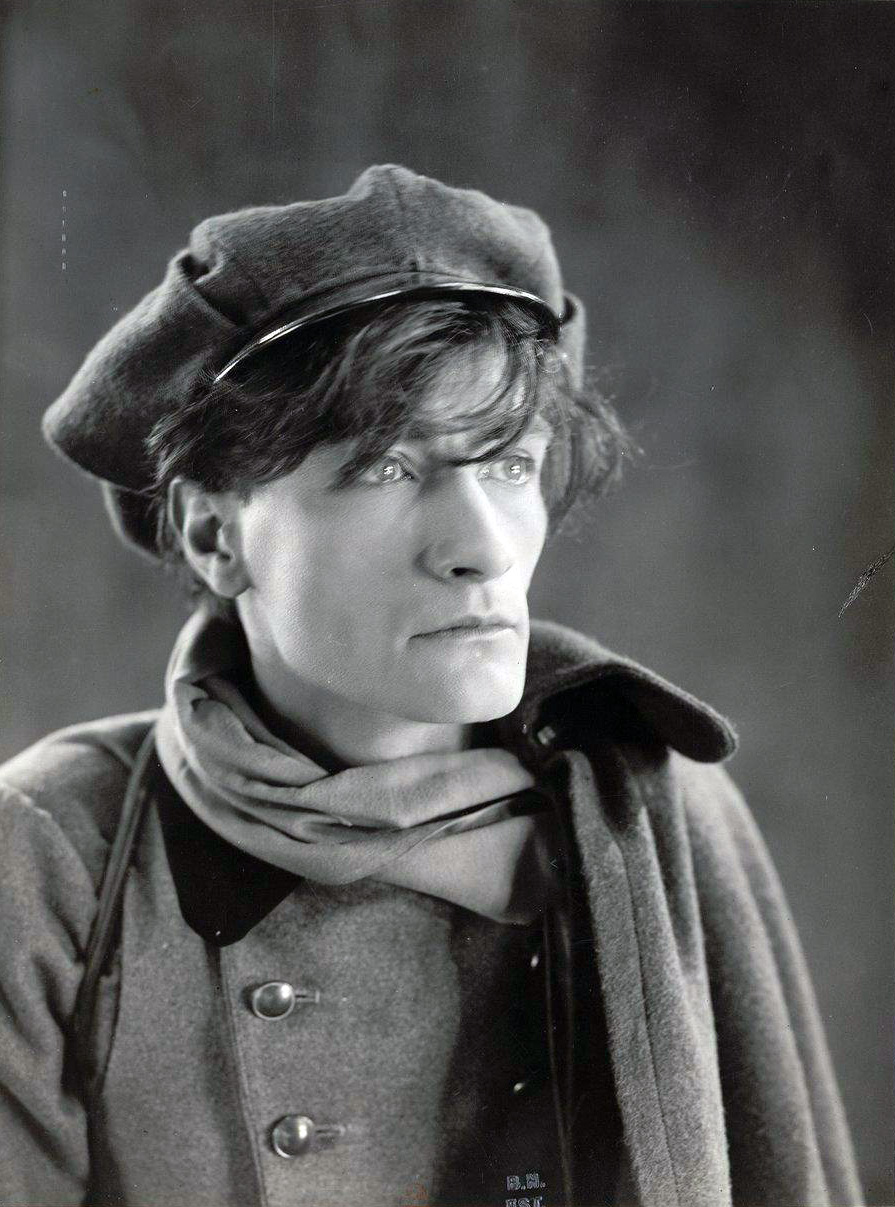
Antonin Artaud

Encyclopædia Britannica describes the Theatre of Cruelty as "a primitive ceremonial experience intended to liberate the human subconscious and reveal man to himself" and points out that Manifeste du théâtre de la cruauté (1932; Manifesto of the Theatre of Cruelty) and Le Théâtre et son double (1938; The Theatre and Its Double) both called for "communion between actor and audience in a magic exorcism; gestures, sounds, unusual scenery, and lighting combine to form a language, superior to words, that can be used to subvert thought and logic and to shock the spectator into seeing the baseness of his world." Artaud warned against the dangers of psychology in theatre and strove to create a theatre in which the mise-en-scène, everything present in the staging of a production, could be understood as a codified stage language, with minimal emphasis on spoken language.

=== Defining Artaud's "theatre" and "cruelty" ===
In his writings on the Theatre of Cruelty, Artaud notes that both "theatre" and "cruelty" are separate from their colloquial meanings. For Artaud, theatre does not merely refer to a staged performance before a passive audience. The theatre is a practice, which "wakes us up. Nerves and heart," and through which we experience "immediate violent action" that "inspires us with the fiery magnetism of its images and acts upon us like a spiritual therapeutics whose touch can never be forgotten."

Similarly, cruelty does not refer to an act of emotional or physical violence. According to scholar Nathan Gorelick,

Cruelty is, more profoundly, the unrelenting agitation of a life that has become unnecessary, lazy, or removed from a compelling force. The Theatre of Cruelty gives expression to everything that is ‘crime, love, war, or madness' in order to ‘unforgettably root within us the ideas of perpetual conflict, a spasm in which life is continually lacerated, in which everything in creation rises up and asserts itself against our appointed rank.

For Artaud, cruelty is not exclusively sadism or causing pain, but just as often a violent, physical determination to shatter a false reality. He believed that text had been a tyrant over meaning, and advocated, instead, for a theatre made up of a unique language, halfway between thought and gesture. Artaud described the spiritual in physical terms, and believed that all theatre is physical expression in space.

The Theatre of Cruelty has been created in order to restore to the theatre a passionate and convulsive conception of life, and it is in this sense of violent rigour and extreme condensation of scenic elements that the cruelty on which it is based must be understood. This cruelty, which will be bloody when necessary but not systematically so, can thus be identified with a kind of severe moral purity which is not afraid to pay life the price it must be paid.

— Antonin Artaud, The Theatre of Cruelty, in The Theory of the Modern Stage (ed. Eric Bentley), Penguin, 1968, p.66

Evidently, Artaud's various uses of the term cruelty must be examined to fully understand his ideas. Lee Jamieson has identified four ways in which Artaud used the term cruelty. First, it is employed metaphorically to describe the essence of human existence.

[Nietzsche's] definition of cruelty informs Artaud's own, declaring that all art embodies and intensifies the underlying brutalities of life to recreate the thrill of experience ... Although Artaud did not formally cite Nietzsche, [their writing] contains a familiar persuasive authority, a similar exuberant phraseology, and motifs in extremis ...

— Lee Jamieson, Antonin Artaud: From Theory to Practice, Greenwich Exchange, 2007, p.21-22

Artaud's second use of the term (according to Jamieson), is as a form of discipline. Although Artaud wanted to "reject form and incite chaos" (Jamieson, p. 22), he also promoted strict discipline and rigor in his performance techniques. A third use of the term was 'cruelty as theatrical presentation'. The Theatre of Cruelty aimed to hurl the spectator into the centre of the action, forcing them to engage with the performance on an instinctive level. For Artaud, this was a cruel, yet necessary act upon the spectator, designed to shock them out of their complacency:

Artaud sought to remove aesthetic distance, bringing the audience into direct contact with the dangers of life. By turning theatre into a place where the spectator is exposed rather than protected, Artaud was committing an act of cruelty upon them.

— Lee Jamieson, Antonin Artaud: From Theory to Practice, Greenwich Exchange, 2007, p.23

Artaud wanted to put the audience in the middle of the 'spectacle' (his term for the play), so they would be 'engulfed and physically affected by it'. He referred to this layout as being like a 'vortex' – a constantly shifting shape – 'to be trapped and powerless'. He also placed a great emphasis on sound rather than words or dialogue, by incorporating loud cries, screams, eerie sounds, or noises causing the audience to become uncomfortable. Words were an insufficient medium of expression.

Finally, Artaud used the term to describe his philosophical views.

=== Break with Western theatre ===
In The Theatre and Its Double, Artaud expressed his admiration for Eastern forms of theatre, particularly the Balinese. Artaud felt that the focus of theatre in the west had become far too narrow—primarily examining the psychological suffering of individuals or the societal struggles of specific groups of people. He wanted to delve into the aspects of the subconscious that he believed were often the root cause of human being's mistreatment of one another. Through an assault on the audiences' senses, Artaud was convinced that a theatrical experience could help people purge destructive feelings and experience the joy that society forces them to repress. For Artaud, "the theatre has been created to drain abscesses collectively."

=== Insufficiency of language ===
Artaud believed that language was an entirely insufficient means to express trauma. Accordingly, he felt that words should be stripped of meaning and chosen for their phonic elements. According to scholar Robert Vork, "Speech on the Theatre of Cruelty's stage is reduced to inarticulate sounds, cries, and gibbering screams, no longer inviting a subject into being but seeking to preclude its very existence." Somewhat paradoxically, Artaud claims that his characters are able to express things that others are unable to say. Vork claims, "Artaud seems to be suggesting that his play reveals emotions and experiences that we all attempt to proscribe and are unwilling to acknowledge, but which nevertheless occur."

=== "Impossible theatre" ===
Stephen Barber explains that "the Theatre of Cruelty has often been called an 'impossible theatre'—vital for the purity of inspiration which it generated, but hopelessly vague and metaphorical in its concrete detail." This impossibility has not prevented others from articulating a version of his principles as the basis for explorations of their own. "Though many of those theatre-artists proclaimed an Artaudian lineage," Susie Tharu argues, "the Artaud they invoke is marked by a commitment as ahistorical and transcendent as their own." There is, she suggests, another Artaud and "the tradition he was midwife to."

== Productions and staging ==
Artaud wanted to abolish the stage and auditorium, and to do away with sets and props and masks. He envisioned the performance space as an empty room with the audience seated in the center and the actors performing all around them. The stage effects included overwhelming sounds and bright lights in order to stun the audience's sensibilities and completely immerse them in the theatrical experience. Artaud believed that he could erode an audience's resistance by using these methods, "addressed first of all to the senses rather than to the mind," because, "the public thinks first with all of its senses."

In his lifetime, Artaud only produced one play that put the theories of the Theatre of Cruelty into practice. He staged and directed Les Cenci, adapted from the dramatic work of the same title by Percy Bysshe Shelley, in 1935 at the Théâtre des Folies-Wagram in Paris. The play was neither a commercial or critical success and ran for only 17 performances. Artaud, however, believed that, while he was forced to limit the scope of his vision due to financial constraints, Les Cenci succeeded in exemplifying the tenets of the Theatre of Cruelty.

== Legacy ==
According to scholar Pericles Lewis, the influences of the Theatre of Cruelty can most clearly be seen in the works of Jean Genet, a post World War II playwright. His plays featured ritualized murder and systemic oppression in order to show the negative consequences and suffering caused by political subjugation. In the 1960s, a number of directors began to incorporate Artaud's theories and staging practices in their work, including Jerzy Grotowski at the Polish Laboratory Theatre. In England, famed theatre director Peter Brook experimented with the Theatre of Cruelty in a series of workshops at the Royal Shakespeare Company (RSC). These experiments are reflected in his direction and staging of RSC's lauded 1966 production of Marat/Sade, a play with music by Peter Weiss. Marat/Sade uses dramatic devices developed by both Artaud and Brecht to depict class struggle and human suffering in the midst of changing social structures.

The German dramatist Heiner Müller argues that we have yet to feel or to appreciate fully Artaud's contribution to theatrical culture; his ideas are, Müller implies, 'untimely': "The emergency is Artaud. He tore literature away from the police, theatre away from medicine. Under the sun of torture, which shines equally on all the continents of this planet, his texts blossom. Read on the ruins of Europe, they will be classics."

== Modern activist application ==
In 2011, a group of geography and sociology professors used the Theatre of Cruelty as a conceptual, experience-based technique to explore the agrarian struggle and deforestation in the Amazon Basin. These professors: "…suggest that theater, more generally, provides structure for cruel performance, and that violent land conflict, together with forest destruction, constitutes a predictable tragedy of theatrical events. In other words, violent land conflict in Amazonia, with all its terrible implication for people and environment, can be grasped as a theatrical structure with philosophic and material consequences for mind and body."

== See also ==
- Theatre of the Absurd
- Living Theatre
- Panic Movement
- Viennese Actionism
- Experimental theatre
- Theatre of France
