= Arthur Adamov =

Playwright (1908–1970)

- Born: Artur Adamian; 23 August 1908; Kislovodsk, Terek Oblast, Russian Empire
- Died: 15 March 1970 (aged 61); Paris, France
- Resting place: Ivry Cemetery, Ivry-sur-Seine
- Writing career
- Language: French
- Literary movement: Theatre of the absurd

Arthur Adamov (23 August 1908 – 15 March 1970) was a Russian playwright, and is widely condidered to be one of the foremost exponents of what Martin Esslin called 'The Theatre of the Absurd'.

== Early life ==
Adamov (originally Adamian) was born in Kislovodsk in the Terek Oblast of the Russian Empire to a wealthy Armenian family.^{:92} At the outbreak of the First World War, the family was at risk of being interned as "enemy citizens", and only "through the special intervention of the King of Wurttemberg" were they able to escape to Geneva, Switzerland.^{:93} Adamov was educated in Switzerland and Germany,^{:93} with French as his primary language. In 1924, when he was sixteen years old, he moved to Paris, France.^{:93} There he met artists associated with the Surrealist Movement and edited the surrealist journal Discontinuité.^{:93}

== Postwar career ==
He began to write plays at the end of World War II.^{:98} La Parodie (1947) was his first play, which Martin Esslin has identified as "an attempt to come to terms with neurosis, to make psychological states visible in concrete terms".^{:98} His work influenced by August Strindberg,^{:98} is often dream-like and later works in particular have a political element influenced by Bertolt Brecht. The title character of one of his best known works, Le Professeur Taranne (1953), is accused of various things (public nudity, littering, plagiarism), all of which he strenuously denies, only to have his denials turned against him into more evidence of misdemeanours. This particular play was directly influenced by a dream Adamov had.

Lesser known to the public is his prose work with short stories such as "Fin Août" (in Je... Ils..., 1969). Their themes revolve around topics including masochism, which the author regarded as "immunisation against death". Adamov translated a number of works by German authors (Rilke, Büchner) and Russian classics (Gogol, Chekhov) into French.

A supporter of left-wing politics throughout his life, the Algerian War radicalised his political views and in the 1960s he became a Communist. During his later years, he began to drink and use drugs which severely impacted his health.

Adamov's death in 1970 was due to an overdose of barbiturates.

== Selected works ==
- L'Aveu (The Confession, 1946)
- La Parodie (The Parody, 1950)
- L'Invasion (The Invasion, 1950)
- La Grande et la Petite Manoeuvre (The Grand and Small Manoeuvre, 1950)
- Le Sens de la Marche (The Way to Go, 1953)
- Tous contre tous (All against all, 1953)
- Le Professeur Taranne (Professor Taranne, 1953)
- Le Ping-Pong (Ping Pong, 1955)
- Paolo Paoli (1957)
- Le Printemps '71 (Spring '71, 1960)
- La Politique des Restes (The Politics of Rubbish, 1963)
- Ici et Maintenant (Here and Now, 1964)
- Sainte Europe (Holy Europe, 1966)
- M. le Modéré (Mr. Moderate, 1968)
- Off Limits (1969)
- Si l'été revenait (If Summer Came Again, 1970)
