= The Theatre and Its Double =

1938 essay collection by Antonin Artaud

The Theatre and Its Double (Le Théâtre et son Double) is a 1938 collection of essays by French poet and playwright Antonin Artaud. It contains his most famous works on the theatre, including his manifestos for a Theatre of Cruelty.

== Composition and publication history ==
The Theatre and Its Double was originally published 1 February 1938 as part of Gallimard's Métamorpheses Collection in an edition limited to 400 copies.^{:51} The books consists of Artaud's collected essays on theatre dating from the early thirties, many of which were published in Nouvelle Revue Française (NRF). Artaud was in "a near catatonic state in the mental hospital of Sainte-Anne" in Paris when the book was finally published.^{:51} He had been able to correct the text's proofs between his journeys to Ireland and Mexico.^{:104}

=== Chronological release ===
Title	Date	Publication	Notes
On the Balinese Theatre	1931	NRF	Part 1 was published as 'The Balinese Theatre at the Colonial Exhibition' in NRF (no. 217, Oct. 1931)^{:106}
Production and Metaphysics	1932	NRF	Originally presented as a lecture at the Sorbonne (10 Dec 1931). Published in NRF (no. 221, 1st Feb. 1932).^{:105}
Alchemist Theatre'/'El teatro alquemico	1932	Sur	Published in Spanish in the Buenos Aires-based magazine Sur (no. 6, Sept. 1932)^{:106}
The Theatre of Cruelty	1932	NRF	Published in NRF (no. 229, 1st Oct. 1932).^{:105}
Second Manifesto of The Theatre of Cruelty	1933	Éditions Denoël	Originally published as a sixteen-page booklet by Éditions Denoël (Fontenay-Au-Roses, 1933).^{:111}
Theatre and the plague	1933/34	NRF	Originally presented as a lecture at the Sorbonne (6 April 1933), it was revised and published in NRF (no. 253, 1st Oct. 1934).^{:105} Artaud developed the essay while undergoing acupuncture therapy. He was 'surprised and amazed' at how the treatment pinpointed 'with precision and remarkable accuracy the deep, debilitating and demoralizing troubles that have afflicted [him] for so long', something he related to 'the "exteriorization" of "latent cruelty" causing the "organic disorder" (OC 4: 33) in plague-victims'.

== Themes ==
Artaud looked to revitalise life through theatre, bringing about a transformation of the audience and society. His work was an attack on theatrical convention and theatre's overemphasis on written and spoken language. For example, in No More Masterpieces, Artaud attacks what he believed to be the elitism of an irrelevant, outdated literary/theatrical canon, calling for theatre "to finally do away with the idea of masterpieces reserved for the so-called elite, but incomprehensible to the masses".^{:53}

Two key themes are the "double" and "cruelty".^{:49} For Artaud, "the double consisted of those things which can bring about a glimpse into real life, that which is not corrupted by culture and civilisation."^{:49} Cruelty, was "a violent rigour" and "extreme concentration of stage elements" that would restore to audiences "an impassioned, convulsive concept of life to theatre".^{:50}

Artaud expressed the importance of recovering "the notion of a kind of unique language half-way between gesture and thought".

== English translation and influence ==
The first English edition of The Theatre and Its Double was translated by M.C. Richards and published by Grove Press in 1958. Richards encountered Artaud's name in Jean-Louis Barrault's memoir Reflections on the Theatre (1951).^{:35} Prior to beginning the translation, Richards had collaborated in a close reading of the text with John Cage and David Tudor at Black Mountain College. Cage credited this close reading as the impetus for Theater Piece No.1, a 1951 performance art event regarded as the first Happening. Participants included Robert Rauschenberg, Charles Olson, David Tudor and Merce Cunningham. Afterwards, Tudor encouraged Richards to begin translating the text.

Richards' translation introduced Artaud to the avant-garde scene in America, and is still considered to be the definitive English translation of the text. It is still read, and strongly influenced the directing philosophies of such renowned avant-garde and contemporary groups and figures as Peter Brook, The Living Theatre, The Open Theatre and La Mama's Great Jones Repertory Company, most notably in their production of The Trojan Women directed by Andrei Serban and composed by Elizabeth Swados.

== See also ==
- Le Monde's 100 Books of the Century
