= Antonin Artaud =

French artist (1896–1948)

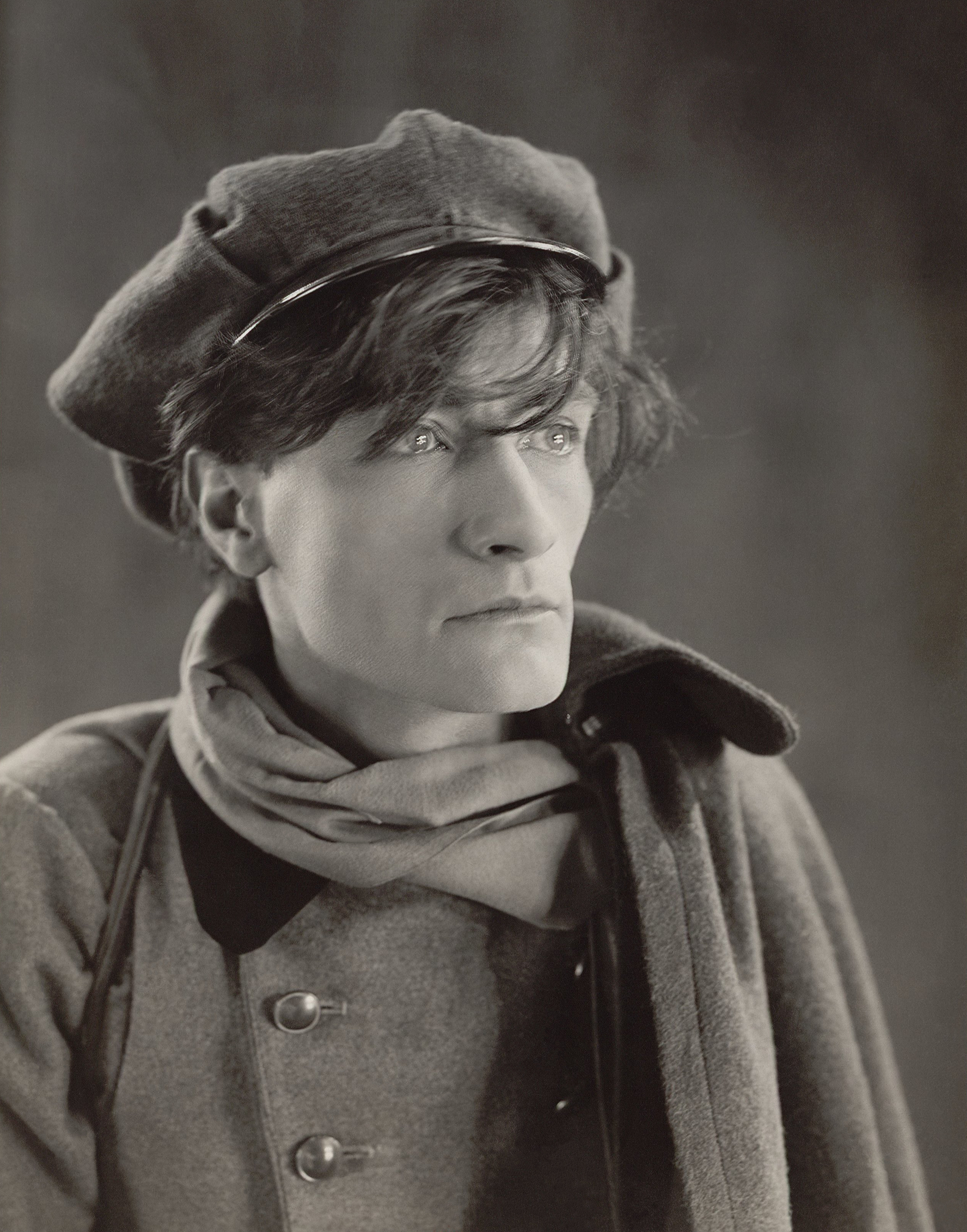
- Artaud as Gringalet, in Le Juif Errant 1926
- Born: Antoine-Maria-Joseph Artaud; 4 September 1896; Marseille, France
- Died: 4 March 1948 (aged 51); Ivry-sur-Seine, France
- Resting place: Saint-Pierre Cemetery, Marseille
- Education: Collège du Sacré-Cœur
- Occupations: Theatre director; poet; actor; artist; essayist
- Known for: Theatre of Cruelty; Body without organs
- Notable work: The Theatre and Its Double

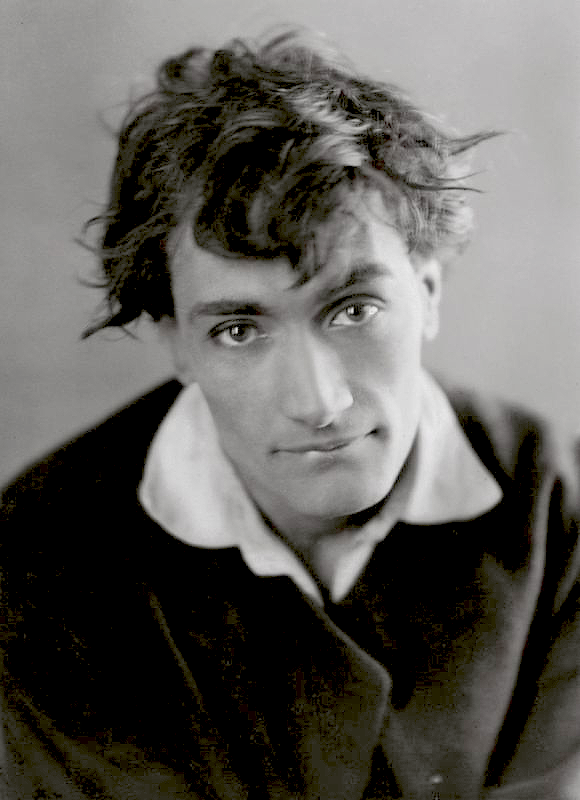
Antonin Artaud in 1926

Antoine Maria Joseph Paul Artaud (/ɑːrˈtoʊ/; French: [aʁto]; 4 September 1896 – 4 March 1948), better known as Antonin Artaud (French pronunciation: [ɑ̃tɔnɛ̃ aʁto]), was a French artist who worked across a variety of media. He is best known for his writings, as well as his work in the theatre and cinema. Widely recognized as a major figure of the European avant-garde, he had a particularly strong influence on twentieth-century theatre through his conceptualization of the Theatre of Cruelty. Known for his raw, surreal and transgressive work, his texts explored themes from the cosmologies of ancient cultures, philosophy, the occult, mysticism and indigenous Mexican and Balinese practices.

== Early life ==
Antonin was born in Marseille, to Euphrasie Nalpas and Antoine-Roi Artaud. His parents were first cousins: his grandmothers were sisters from Smyrna (modern day İzmir, Turkey). His paternal grandmother, Catherine Chilé, was raised in Marseille, where she married Marius Artaud, a Frenchman. His maternal grandmother, Mariette Chilé, grew up in Smyrna, where she married Louis Nalpas, a local ship chandler. Euphrasie gave birth to nine children, but four were stillborn and two others died in childhood.

At age five, Artaud was diagnosed with meningitis, which had no cure at the time. Biographer David Shafer argues, however, that

given the frequency of such misdiagnoses, coupled with the absence of a treatment (and consequent near-minimal survival rate) and the symptoms he had, it's unlikely that Artaud actually contracted it.

Artaud attended the Collège Sacré-Coeur in Marseille, a Catholic middle and high school, from 1907 to 1914. At fourteen years old he founded a small private literary magazine (une petite revue) with others where he published his first poems, inspired by Arthur Rimbaud, Stéphane Mallarmé, Charles Baudelaire, and Edgar Allan Poe. Towards the end of his tenure at the Collège, Artaud noticeably withdrew from social life and "destroyed most of his written work and gave away his books".^{:3} Distressed, his parents arranged for him to see a psychiatrist.^{:25} Over the next five years Artaud was admitted to a series of sanatoria.^{:163}

In 1916, there was a pause in Artaud's treatment when he was conscripted into the French Army.^{:26} He was discharged early due to "an unspecified health reason" (Artaud later claimed it was "due to sleepwalking", while his mother ascribed it to his "nervous condition").^{:4}

In May 1919, the director of the sanatorium prescribed laudanum for Artaud, precipitating a lifelong addiction to that and other opiates.^{:162} In March 1921, he moved to Paris where he was put under the psychiatric care of Dr Édouard Toulouse who took him in as a boarder.^{:29}

== Career ==
=== Theatrical apprenticeships ===
In Paris, Artaud worked with a number of celebrated French "teacher-directors", including Jacques Copeau, André Antoine, Georges Pitoëff, Ludmilla Pitoëff, Charles Dullin, Firmin Gémier and Lugné-Poe. Lugné-Poe, who gave Artaud his first work in a professional theatre, later described him as "a painter lost in the midst of actors".

His core theatrical training was as part of Dullin's troupe, Théâtre de l'Atelier, which he joined in 1921.^{:345} As a member of Dullin's troupe, Artaud trained for 10 to 12 hours a day. He was originally a strong proponent of Dullin's teaching and they shared a strong interest in east Asian theatre, specifically performance traditions from Bali and Japan.^{:10} He stated, "Hearing Dullin teach I feel that I'm rediscovering ancient secrets and a whole forgotten mystique of production."^{:351} However, their disagreements increased over time, particularly in relation to the differing logics of Eastern and Western theatre traditions.^{:351-2} Their final disagreement was over his performance as the Emperor Charlemagne in Alexandre Arnoux's Huon de Bordeaux; he left the troupe in 1923 after eighteen months as a member.^{:22;}^{:345}

Shortly thereafter he joined the troupe of Georges and Ludmilla Pitoëff. He remained with them through the next year, when he shifted his focus to work in the cinema.^{:15-16}

=== Literary career ===
In 1923, Artaud submitted poems to La Nouvelle Revue Française (NRF), a prominent French literary journal. The poems were rejected, but Jacques Rivière, the journal's editor, found Artaud intriguing and invited him for a meeting. This initiated a written correspondence, which resulted in Artaud's first major publication, the epistolary work Correspondance avec Jacques Rivière.^{:45} Artaud continued to publish some of his most influential works in the NRF. Later, he would revise many of these texts for inclusion in The Theatre and Its Double, including the "First Manifesto for a Theatre of Cruelty" (1932) and "Theatre and the plague" (1933).^{:105}

== Work in cinema ==
Artaud had an active career in the cinema as a critic, actor, and writer. This included his performance as Jean-Paul Marat in Abel Gance's Napoléon (1927) and the monk Massieu in Carl Theodor Dreyer's The Passion of Joan of Arc (1928).:17

Artaud also wrote a number of film screenplays, ten of which have survived.:23 Only one of the scripts was produced during his lifetime, The Seashell and the Clergyman (1928). Directed by Germaine Dulac, many critics and scholars consider it to be the first surrealist film, though Artaud's relationship to the resulting film was conflicted. The complete list of these ten surviving screenplays and adaptation projects includes:

- The Seashell and the Clergyman (La Coquille et le Clergyman)
- The Eighteen Seconds (Les dix-huit secondes)
- Two Nations on the Confines of Mongolia (Deux nations aux confins de la Mongolie)
- The Thirty-Two (Les trente-deux)
- The Butcher's Revolt (La Révolte du boucher)
- Flights (Volées)
- The Master of Ballantrae (Le Maître de Ballantrae)
- The Diaboliques (Les Diaboliques)
- The Bastard of Mauléon / Joseph Balsamo (Le Bâtard de Mauléon / Joseph Balsamo)
- The Dybbuk (Le Dibbouk)

=== Association with surrealists ===
Artaud was briefly associated with the surrealists, before André Breton expelled him from the movement in 1927.^{:21} This was in part due to the Surrealists increasing affiliation with the Communist Party in France.^{: 274} As Ros Murray notes, "Artaud was not into politics at all, writing things like: 'I shit on Marxism.'" Additionally, "Breton was becoming very anti-theatre because he saw theatre as being bourgeois and anti-revolutionary."

In "The Manifesto for an Abortive Theatre" (1926/27), written for the Theatre Alfred Jarry, Artaud makes a direct attack on the surrealists, whom he calls "bog-paper revolutionaries" that would "make us believe that to produce theatre today is a counter-revolutionary endeavour".^{:24} He declares they are "bowing down to Communism",^{:25} which is "a lazy man's revolution",^{:24} and calls for a more "essential metamorphosis" of society.^{:25}

=== Théâtre Alfred Jarry (1926–1929) ===
In 1926, Artaud, Robert Aron and the expelled surrealist Roger Vitrac founded the Théâtre Alfred Jarry (TAJ). They staged four productions between June 1927 and January 1929. The Theatre was extremely short-lived, but was attended by an enormous range of European artists, including Arthur Adamov, André Gide, and Paul Valéry.^{:249}

=== At the Paris Colonial Exposition (1931) ===
In 1931, Artaud saw Balinese dance performed at the Paris Colonial Exposition. Although he misunderstood much of what he saw, it influenced his ideas for theatre.^{:26} Adrian Curtin has noted the significance of the Balinese use of music and sound for Artaud, and particularly

the 'hypnotic' rhythms of the gamelan ensemble, its range of percussive effects, the variety of timbres that the musicians produced, and – most importantly, perhaps – the way in which the dancers' movements interacted dynamically with the musical elements instead of simply functioning as a type of background accompaniment.

=== The Cenci (1935) ===
In 1935, Artaud staged an original adaptation of Percy Bysshe Shelley's The Cenci at the Théâtre des Folies-Wagram in Paris. The drama was Artaud's first and only chance to stage a production following his manifestos for a Theatre of Cruelty.^{:250} It had a set designed by Balthus and employed innovative sound effects—including the first theatrical use of the electronic instrument the Ondes Martenot. It was, however, a commercial failure.

While Shelley's version of The Cenci conveyed the motivations and anguish of the Cenci's daughter Beatrice with her father through monologues, Artaud's adaptation emphasized the play's cruelty and violence, in particular "its themes of incest, revenge and familial murder".^{:21} Artaud was concerned with conveying the menacing nature of the Cenci's presence and the reverberations of their incest relationship though physical discordance, as if an invisible "force-field" surrounded them.

Artaud's opening stage directions demonstrate his approach. He describes the opening scene as "suggestive of extreme atmospheric turbulence, with wind-blown drapes, waves of suddenly amplified sound, and crowds of figures engaged in "furious orgy", accompanied by "a chorus of church bells", as well as the presence of numerous large mannequins.

Scholar Jane Goodall writes of The Cenci,

The predominance of action over reflection accelerates the development of events...the monologues...are cut in favor of sudden, jarring transitions...so that a spasmodic effect is created. Extreme fluctuations in pace, pitch, and tone heighten sensory awareness intensify ... the here and now of performance.^{:119}

Scholar Adrian Curtin has argued for the importance of the "sonic aspects of the production, which did not merely support the action but motivated it obliquely".^{:251}

=== The Theatre and Its Double (1938) ===
In 1938, Artaud published The Theatre and Its Double, one of his most important texts.^{:34} In it, he proposed

a theatre that was in effect a return to magic and ritual and he sought to create a new theatrical language of totem and gesture – a language of space devoid of dialogue that would appeal to all the senses.

The Theatre of Cruelty, he theorized in the text, abandoned the formal proscenium arch and dominance of the playwright, which he considered "a hindrance to the magic of genuine ritual", in favor of "violent physical images", which would "crush and hypnotize the sensibility of the spectator", who would be "seized by the theatre as by a whirlwind of higher forces".^{:6}

== Travels and institutionalization ==
=== Journey to Mexico ===
In 1935, Artaud decided to go to Mexico, where he was convinced there was "a sort of deep movement in favour of a return to civilisation before Cortez".^{:11} The Mexican Legation in Paris gave him a travel grant, and he left for Mexico in January 1936. After arriving the following month, he "became something of a 'fixture' in the Mexican art scene", though he was often under the influence of opiates, and spent much of his time "seated and immobile, 'cual momia' [like a mummy]".^{;}^{:73}

Artaud also lived in Norogachi, a Rarámuri village in the Sierra Tarahumara.^{:77} He claimed to have participated in peyote rites, though scholars have questioned this. During this time he stopped using opiates and suffered withdrawal.^{:77}

=== Ireland and repatriation to France ===
In 1937, Artaud returned to France, where his friend René Thomas gave him a walking-stick of knotted wood that Artaud believed was the "most sacred relic of the Irish church, the Bachall Ísu, or 'Staff of Jesus'" and contained magical powers.^{:32} Artaud traveled to Ireland, landing at Cobh and travelling to Galway, possibly in an effort to return the staff. Speaking very little English and no Gaelic whatsoever, he was unable to make himself understood.^{:33} In Dublin, Artaud found himself penniless and spent most of his trip in "hostels for the homeless".^{:34} After "several violent alteractions with the Dublin police" he was finally arrested after an incident at a Jesuit college.^{:34} Before deportation he was briefly confined in the notorious Mountjoy Prison.^{:152} According to Irish Government papers he was deported as "a destitute and undesirable alien". On his return voyage, Artaud believed he was being attacked by two of the ship's crew members. He retaliated and was put in a straitjacket; upon his return to France he was involuntarily retained by the police and transferred to a psychiatric hospital.^{:34}

Artaud spent the rest of his life moving between different institutions, depending on his condition and world circumstances.

=== In Rodez ===
In 1943, when France was occupied by the Germans and Italians, Robert Desnos arranged to have Artaud transferred to the psychiatric hospital in Rodez, which was well inside Vichy territory. There he was put under the charge of Dr. Gaston Ferdière. At Rodez, Artaud underwent treatments including electroshock and art therapy.^{:194} The doctor believed that Artaud's habits of crafting magic spells, creating astrology charts, and drawing disturbing images were symptoms of mental illness. Artaud denounced the electroshock treatments and consistently pleaded to have them suspended, while also ascribing to them "the benefit of having returned him to his name and to his self mastery".^{:196} Scholar Alexandra Lukes points out that "the 'recovery' of his name" might have been "a gesture to appease his doctors' conception of what constitutes health".^{:196} It was during this time that Artaud began writing and drawing again, after a long dormant period. In 1946, Ferdière released Artaud to his friends, who placed him in the psychiatric clinic at Ivry-sur-Seine.

== Final years ==
At Ivry-sur-Seine Artaud's friends encouraged him to write. He visited a Vincent van Gogh exhibition at the Orangerie in Paris and wrote the study Van Gogh le suicidé de la société ["Van Gogh, The Man Suicided by Society"]; in 1947, the French magazine K published it.^{:8} In 1949, the essay was the first of Artaud's to be translated in a United States–based publication, the influential literary magazine Tiger's Eye.^{:8} This rekindled interest in his work.

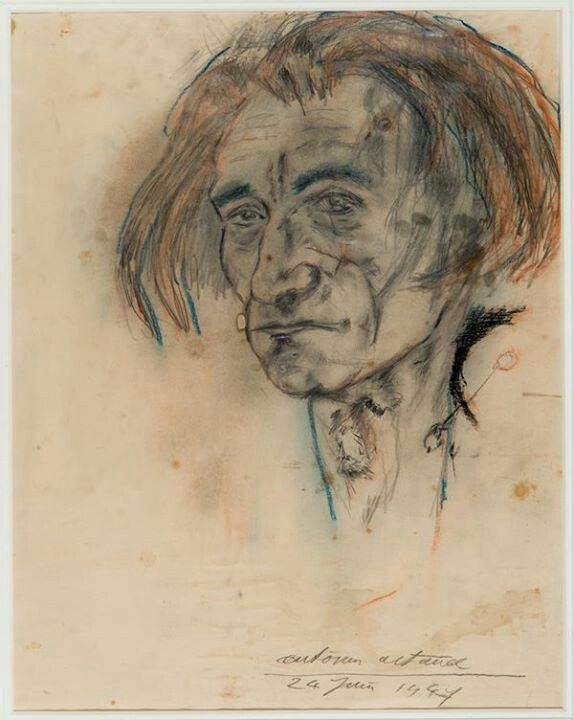
Self-portrait of Artaud from 1947

=== Pour en Finir avec le Jugement de Dieu ===
He recorded Pour en Finir avec le Jugement de Dieu (To Have Done With the Judgment of God) on 22–29 November 1947. The work remained true to his vision for the theatre of cruelty, using "screams, rants and vocal shudders" to forward his vision.^{:1} Wladimir Porché, the Director of French Radio, shelved the work the day before its scheduled airing on 2 February 1948.^{:62} This was partly for its scatological, anti-American, and anti-religious references and pronouncements, but also because of its general randomness, with a cacophony of xylophonic sounds mixed with various percussion elements, as well as cries, screams, grunts, onomatopoeia, and glossolalia.

As a result, Fernand Pouey, the director of dramatic and literary broadcasts for French radio, assembled a panel to consider the broadcast of Pour en Finir avec le Jugement de dieu.^{:62} Among approximately 50 artists, writers, musicians, and journalists present for a private listening on 5 February 1948 were Jean Cocteau, Paul Éluard, Raymond Queneau, Jean-Louis Barrault, René Clair, Jean Paulhan, Maurice Nadeau, Georges Auric, Claude Mauriac, and René Char. Porché refused to broadcast it even though the panel were almost unanimously in favor of Artaud's work being broadcast.^{:62} Pouey left his job and the show was not heard again until 23 February 1948, at a private performance at Théâtre Washington. The work's first public broadcast did not take place until 8 July 1964 when the Los Angeles–based public radio station KPFK played an illegal copy provided by the artist Jean-Jacques Lebel.^{:1} The first French radio broadcast of Pour en Finir avec le Jugement de dieu occurred 20 years after its original production.

=== Death ===
In January 1948, Artaud was diagnosed with colon cancer. He died on 4 March 1948 in a psychiatric clinic in Ivry-sur-Seine, a commune in the southeastern suburbs of Paris. He was found by the gardener of the estate seated alone at the foot of his bed holding a shoe, and it was suspected that he died from a lethal dose of the drug chloral hydrate, although it is unknown whether he was aware of its lethality.

== Legacy and influence ==
Artaud has had a profound influence on theatre, avant-garde art, performance art, literature, psychiatry and other disciplines.

=== Theatre and performance ===
Though many of his works were not produced for the public until after his death—for instance, "Spurt of Blood" (1925) was first produced in 1964, when Peter Brook and Charles Marowitz staged it as part of their "Theatre of Cruelty" season at the Royal Shakespeare Company—he has exerted a strong influence on the development of experimental theatre and performance art. In the introduction to his Selected Works, Susan Sontag asserts that his impact is "so profound" that Western theatre traditions can be divided into two periods – before Artaud and after Artaud".^{:xxxviii}

Artists such as John Cage, Nancy Spero, Karen Finley, Spalding Gray, Elizabeth LeCompte, Richard Foreman, Charles Marowitz, Sam Shepard, Joseph Chaikin, Charles Bukowski, Allen Ginsberg, and more all named Artaud as one of their influences.

His influence can be seen in:

- Barrault's adaptation of Kafka's The Trial (1947).
- The Theatre of the Absurd, particularly the works of Jean Genet and Samuel Beckett.
- Peter Brook's production of Marat/Sade in 1964, which was performed in New York and Paris, as well as London.
- The Living Theatre.
- In the winter of 1968, Williams College offered a dedicated intersession class in Artaudian theatre, resulting in a week-long "Festival of Cruelty", under the direction of Keith Fowler. The Festival included productions of The Jet of Blood, All Writing is Pig Shit, and several original ritualized performances, one based on the Texas Tower killings and another created as an ensemble catharsis called The Resurrection of Pig Man.
- In Canada, playwright Gary Botting created a series of Artaudian "happenings" from The Aeolian Stringer to Zen Rock Festival, and produced a dozen plays with an Artaudian theme, including Prometheus Re-Bound.
- Charles Marowitz's play Artaud at Rodez is about the relationship between Artaud and Dr. Ferdière during Artaud's confinement at the psychiatric hospital in Rodez; the play was first performed in 1976 at the Teatro a Trastavere in Rome.

=== Philosophy ===
Artaud also had a significant influence on philosophers.^{:22} Gilles Deleuze and Félix Guattari borrowed Artaud's phrase "the body without organs" to describe their conception of the virtual dimension of the body and, ultimately, the basic substratum of reality in their Capitalism and Schizophrenia. Philosopher Jacques Derrida provided one of the key philosophical treatments of Artaud's work through his concept of "parole soufflée". Feminist scholar Julia Kristeva drew on Artaud for her theorisation of "subject in process".^{:22-3}

=== Literature ===
Poet Allen Ginsberg claimed Artaud's work, specifically "To Have Done with the Judgement of God", had a tremendous influence on his most famous poem "Howl". The Latin American dramatic novel Yo-Yo Boing! by Giannina Braschi includes a debate between artists and poets concerning the merits of Artaud's "multiple talents" in comparison to the singular talents of other French writers. The 2022 novel, Plague Theatre by Ansgar Allen engages Artaud's writings on plague and theatre and his suggestion that plague approaches theatre, and theatre approach the paroxysms of plague. A novel, Traitor Comet, was published in June 2023 as the first in a series on Artaud's life and his friendship with the poet Robert Desnos. The sequel, L'Etoile de Mer (The Starfish), was published in November 2024, and continues the story of Artaud as he defies André Breton and forms the Theater Alfred Jarry with Roger Vitrac.

=== Music ===
The band Bauhaus included a song about the playwright, called "Antonin Artaud", on their album Burning from the Inside. Argentine hard rock band Pescado Rabioso recorded an album titled Artaud. Their leader Luis Alberto Spinetta wrote the lyrics partly basing them on Artaud's writings.

Venezuelan rock band Zapato 3 included a song named "Antonin Artaud" on their album Ecos punzantes del ayer (1999).

Composer John Zorn has written many works inspired by and dedicated to Artaud, including seven CDs: "Astronome", "Moonchild: Songs Without Words", "Six Litanies for Heliogabalus", "The Crucible", "Ipsissimus", "Templars: In Sacred Blood" and "The Last Judgment", a monodrama for voice and orchestra inspired by Artaud's late drawings "La Machine de l'être" (2000), "Le Momo" (1999) for violin and piano, and "Suppots et Suppliciations" (2012) for full orchestra.

=== Film ===
Filmmaker E. Elias Merhige, during an interview by writer Scott Nicolay, cited Artaud as a key influence for the experimental film Begotten.

== Filmography ==
| Year | Title | Role | Director | Notes |
|---|---|---|---|---|
| 1923 | Fait-divers | Monsieur 2 | Autant-Lara | ^{:182} |
| 1925 | Surcouf | Jacques Morel, a traitor | Luitz-Morat | |
| 1926 | Graziella | Cecco | Marcel Vandal | |
| 1926 | Le Juif Errant | Gringalet | Luitz Morat | ^{:183} |
| 1927 | Napoléon | Marat | Abel Gance | ^{:182} |
| 1928 | The Passion of Joan of Arc | Massieu | Carl Dreyer | |
| 1928 | Verdun: Visions of History | Paul Amiot | Léon Poirier | |
| 1928 | L'Argent | Secretary Mazaud | Marcel L'Herbier | |
| 1929 | Tarakanova | Le jeune tzigane | Raymond Bernard | |
| 1931 | La Femme d'une nuit | A traitor | Marcel L'Herbier | |
| 1931 | Montmartre | Unidentified | Raymond Bernard | |
| 1931 | L'Opéra de quat'sous | A Thief | G. W. Pabst | |
| 1932 | Coups de feu à l'aube | Leader of a group of assassins | Serge de Poligny | |
| 1932 | Les Croix de bois | A delirious soldier | Raymond Bernard | |
| 1932 | L'enfant de ma soeur | unidentified role | Henri Wullschleger | |
| 1933 | Mater Dolorosa | Lawyer | Abel Gance | |
| 1934 | Liliom | Knife-seller | Fritz Lang | |
| 1934 | Sidonie Panache | Emir Aba-el Kadcr | Henri Wullschleger | |
| 1935 | Lucrezia Borgia | Savonarola | Abel Gance | |
| 1935 | Koenigsmark | The Librarian | Maurice Tourneur | |

== Bibliography ==
=== Selected works ===
==== French ====
| Year | Title | Original Publication/Publisher | Notes |
|---|---|---|---|
| 1913 | Sonnets mystique | | |
| 1922 | Tric-Trac du ciel | | |
| 1925 | L'Ombilic des limbes | | |
| 1927 | Le Pèse-Nerfs | | |
| | L'Art et la mort | | |
| | La Coquille et le clergyman | | film scenario |
| | Sorcellerie et cinéma | | |
| 1934 | Héliogabale ou l'Anarchiste couronné | | |
| 1938 | Le Théâtre et son double | Gallimard, Collection Métamorphoses | seminal collection of texts on theatre |
| 1946 | Lettres de Rodez | | |
| 1947 | Van Gogh, le suicide de la société | | |
| | Au pays des Tarahumaras | | |
| 1948 | Pour en finir avec le jugement de Dieu | | |
| | Lettre contre la Kabbale | | |

==== English translation ====
| Year | Title | Translator | Publisher | Notes |
|---|---|---|---|---|
| 1958 | The Theatre and Its Double | Mary Caroline Richards | New York: Grove Weidenfeld | |
| 1963 | Artaud Anthology | Jack Hirschman | San Francisco: City Lights Publishers | Edited and with an introduction by Susan Sontag |
| 1971 | Collected Works of Antonin Artaud | Victor Corti | London: Calder and Boyars | |
| 1976 | Selected Writings | Helen Weaver | New York: Farrar, Straus and Giroux | Edited and with an introduction by Susan Sontag |
| 1995 | Watchfiends and Rack Screams: works from the final period | Clayton Eshleman, with Bernard Bador | Boston: Exact Change | |
| 2008 | 50 Drawings to Murder Magic | Donald Nicholson-Smith | London: Seagull Books | ISBN 978-1-905422-66-1 |
| 2019 | Heliogabalus or, the Crowned Anarchist | Alexis Lykiard | London: Infinity Land Press | ISBN 978-1-9160091-1-0 |
| 2024 | The Theatre and Its Double | Mark Taylor-Batty | Bloomsbury Publishing: Methuen Drama | ISBN 978-1-350-28872-0 |
| 2024 | Journey to Mexico: Revolutionary Messages & The Tarahumara | Rainer J. Hanshe | New York: Contra Mundum Press | ISBN 978-1-940625-64-5 |
