= L'Écume des Jours =

L′Écume des Jours or Froth on the daydream is a 1947 French novel by Boris Vian. It may also refer to:

== Literature ==
- Froth on the Daydream, 1967 translation by Stanley Chapman
- Foam of the Daze, a 2003 translation by Brian Harper

== Film ==
- Spray of the Days, a 1968 film adaptation directed by Charles Belmont
- Mood Indigo (film), a 2013 film adaptation directed by Michel Gondry

== Music ==
- L'écume des jours (opera), a 1981 opera adaptation by Russian composer Edison Denisov
