= Red grass =

Red grass may refer to:

- The Red Grass (French: L'Herbe rouge), a 1950 novel by the French writer Boris Vian
- The Red Grass (TV series), a British science fiction children's television series
- Red grass, Bothriochloa macra, a species of grass
