= Autumn in Peking =

1947 novel by Boris Vian

- First edition
- Author: Boris Vian
- Original title: L'Automne à Pékin
- Translator: Paul Knobloch
- Language: French
- Publisher: Éditions du Scorpion
- Publication date: 1947
- Publication place: France
- English publication date: 2005
- Pages: 317

Autumn in Peking (French: L'Automne à Pékin) is a 1947 novel by the French writer Boris Vian.

== Background ==
Autumn in Peking was written in 1946, a prolific year for Vian, in which he wrote three novels, L’ecume des jours (Froth on the Daydream), J'irai cracher sur vos tombes (I Spit on Your Graves) and L'Automne à Pékin (Autumn in Peking).

== Plot ==
The novel's leading characters are Anne and Angel (both men) who are best friends. Angel, the central figure of the Autumn in Beijing, is also the husband and father of Clementine's children in L'Arrache-cœur. Rochelle is in love with and sleeps with Anne, while Angel is madly in love with her, a love sadly unreciprocated. James Sallis in his review in the Boston Globe describes a novel about an "expedition to build a railway in the desert of Exopotamie, populated with engineers, randy priests and hermits, lovelorn couples, and a physician obsessed with model airplanes, as well as by buses that feed on catfish bones, typewriters that shiver when uncovered, and bedclothes that climb affectionately back into place when thrown back, even a chair that falls ill and must be hospitalized.

== Publication ==
Autumn in Peking was published by Jean d’Halluin's Éditions du Scorpion in 1947 with a second edition (revised by the author) at Éditions de Minuit in 1956 which had a drawing by Mose on the cover. It was reissued in 1963 and reprinted a number of times.

== Reception ==
J. K. L. Scott describes Autumn in Peking as a narrative of disillusion set in the adult world, rooted in the absurdities of industrial society, and a story of hopeless love (much like Vian's preceding novel L’ecume des jours). Scott says it is connected with L’ecume des jours and indeed it shares some characters with that novel. It was the only one of Vian's serious novels to be republished in his lifetime. Its second publication by Jérome Lindon's Éditions de Minuit was on the recommendation of Alain Robbe-Grillet.

The French critic Bruno Maillé has described it as a surrealist novel, something the surrealists themselves refuted. However, Alistair Rolls in his study of intertextuality in four novels of Boris Vian argues the novel contains many surrealist elements and techniques. The Peking (or Beijing) of the title is not literal; if anywhere the location of the novel's main action is a “dream-desert” allowing Vian to play with visual extremes of searing light and heat as well as intense blackness and night. It takes place in an imaginary desert called Exopotamie where a train station and a railway line are under construction. Pestereaux argued that Peking was simply slang for Paris; an allegory of Paris post WW2 reconstruction and the insanity of its bureaucracy.

"L'Automne à Pékin could well become one of the classics of a literature which, after having exhausted with a uniformly accelerated movement all the nuances of the sinister, from Romanticism to Naturalism and from Socialism to Mysticism, notes all of a sudden that it winds up in the desert of Exopotamie; a literature where one is finally permitted to laugh!" - Alain Robbe-Grillet.

== Adaptation ==
The novel was the basis for the 2017 comic book L'Automne à Pékin by Paul and Gaëtan Brizzi.

== See also ==
- 1947 in literature
- 20th-century French literature
