= James Houlik =

American classical tenor saxophonist and saxophone teacher

James Houlik (/ˈhoʊlɪk/ HOH-lik; born December 4, 1942, in Bay Shore, New York) is an American classical tenor saxophonist and saxophone teacher.

== Family life ==
Houlik is married for the third time, and has fathered four children. He has four grand children and four daughters.

== Education ==
He first became a student of the tenor saxophone under the guidance of Harvey Egan during his early years at Islip High School. He studied music education at State University of New York at Fredonia and the University of Illinois. He studied with saxophonist Cecil Leeson at Ball State University. He studied saxophone with classical saxophone pioneer Sigurd Raschèr, and did additional study with Raschèr at the Eastman School of Music.

The vast majority of classical saxophonists play alto saxophone almost exclusively. Houlik, however, gravitated to the tenor saxophone early in life, and was encouraged by Raschèr to pursue the instrument.

== Teaching career ==
Houlik began teaching at East Carolina University where he built a successful saxophone program.

He later became professor of Saxophone at the North Carolina School of the Arts.

He was for twenty-two years Professor of Saxophone and Chair of Woodwinds at Duquesne University, and is now Artist Lecturer in Saxophone at Carnegie Mellon University, both in Pittsburgh, Pennsylvania.

He has held many summer saxophone study programs, at North Carolina School of the Arts and more recently at Wildacres Retreat, a facility in Little Switzerland, North Carolina. At the Wildacres workshops he is joined by the members of the New Century Saxophone Quartet who coach saxophone quartets made up of workshop participants.

== Performing career ==
Houlik began his performing career with a Washington, D.C., debut at the Phillips Collection. He has appeared in such major venues as Carnegie Hall, Lincoln Center, Town Hall in Toronto, the Smithsonian Institution, and London's Barbican.

His Carnegie Hall debut was in 1978 and he played Alice Tully Hall in 1981.

He regularly appears on university campuses throughout the United States as a performer and as a teacher of clinics and master classes.

His concerto performances have included those with the American Symphony Orchestra, the Grant Park Symphony, the London Symphony Orchestra, the Phoenix Symphony, the West Virginia Symphony, the San Remo Orchestra (Italy), the Istanbul Philharmonic, the North Carolina Symphony, the Chamber Orchestra of Milan, the New Art Philharmonic of Pretoria, South Africa, the Czech Philharmonic Chamber Orchestra, the United States Navy Band, and dozens more.

The Washington Post hailed Houlik as “The Andrés Segovia of the Tenor Saxophone.”

In 1995, Houlik performed for President Clinton in the East Room of the White House at the National Arts Award Ceremony.

He is an artist/clinician for the Yamaha Corporation and D'Addario Reserve reeds.

== Saxophone works composed for Houlik ==
Following the example of Sigurd Raschèr, Houlik has worked closely with many composers to foster the development of a repertoire for the tenor saxophone, an instrument with few concertos in its repertoire.

Over one hundred pieces of music have been composed for, or commissioned by, Houlik. These include:

- Walter S. Hartley, "Poem", 1967
- Walter S. Hartley, Sonatina, 1967
- Robert Ward, Concerto for tenor saxophone
- Morton Gould, Diversions for Tenor Saxophone
- David Ott
- Sherwood Shaffer
- Eric Ewazen, Concerto for Tenor Saxophone and Orchestra, 1992
- Russell Peck, "The Upward Stream" concerto for tenor saxophone and orchestra, 1986
- Paul Harvey
- Vache Sharafyan Concerto for Tenor Saxophone & symphony orchestra, 2003 (an excerpt can be found on YouTube)
- Dilorom Saidaminova, Concerto for Saxophone and Orchestra, 2003
- Michael Cunningham, "Trigon, Op. 31" 1969

== Discography ==
- Russell Peck, "The Upward Stream: Music of Russell Peck"
- "American Saxophone" (music of Morton Gould, Russell Peck, Robert Ward) with the London Symphony Orchestra, North Carolina Symphony Orchestra, Winston-Salem Piedmont Triad Symphony Orchestra, conductors: Gerhardt Zimmermann, Paul Anthony McRae, Pieter Perret. Audio CD, December 3, 1996, Label: Koch Int'l Classics
- "Robert Ward: Jubilation Overture; Symphony No. 4; Concerto for Saxophone; Sonic Structure"
- "Night Fantasy, Music For Winds" music of Robert Ward
- "Orchestral Music & Concertos by Eric Ewazen", Czech Philharmonic Chamber Orchestra, Conductor: Paul Polivnick, Audio CD (February 26, 2002), Label: Albany Records
- "Tenor Tapestry" (with pianist [[{Debra Ayers]]), Aerophon Recordings
- "On Wings of Song" (with pianist Vahan Sargsyan), unreleased
- (need other titles)
