= Je voudrais pas crever =

1962 collection of poetry by Boris Vian

Je voudrais pas crever (I wouldn't want to croak)
- Author: Boris Vian
- Language: French
- Genre: Poetry
- Publisher: Jean-Jacques Pauvert
- Publication date: 1962
- Publication place: France
- Media type: Print
- Pages: 79

"Je voudrais pas crever" (French for 'I wouldn't want to croak') is a collection of poetry by French author Boris Vian, published posthumously in 1962.

== Background ==
The set of 23 poems was first published by the famed publisher Jean-Jacques Pauvert, three years after the death of Vian in 1959 and at a time when his literary stock was rising on the heels of the publication of Romans et Nouvelles and the re-publication of L'Écume des jours. The collection is named for the title of the first poem; the manuscript has no title. The poems, many of which deal with tragedy and death, were written in 1951-51, when Vian was undergoing marital, financial, and creative difficulties. They are often discussed as if they are autobiographical.

In the edition edited by Noël Arnaud (first published in 1972 and republished in 1989), the poems are followed by four letters (written between 1953 and 1959) to the College of 'Pataphysics, the Parisian philosophical group of artists and writers dedicated to the study of what lies beyond metaphysics. Also included are two brief texts by Vian on literature and the role of the writer.

== The influence of Je voudrais pas crever ==
The book has proven inspirational for many French artists, especially singers. Serge Reggiani, one of the most influential French chansonniers of the 1960s, sang Boris Vian songs and also recorded Je voudrais pas crever. In 2001, for instance, Libération published a full-length article on the French band Eiffel, whose leader, Romain Humeau, claims Vian's book was the inspiration for their 2000 album Abricotine.

=== Je voudrais pas crever in 2009 ===
In 2009, fifty years after Vian's death, a wave of books about him and his work as well as re-issues of his books (including no fewer than thirty-three Le Livre de Poche editions) proved that Vian is more popular than ever, as the French magazine Le Point stated; one of the new books is a reissue of Je voudrais pas crever, illustrated by Jacques de Loustal and others. The book is dedicated to the French illustrator Martin Matje, and was accompanied by an exhibition in Quebec.

== Editions ==
- Vian, Boris (1962). Je voudrais pas crever. J.J. Pauvert.
- Vian, Boris (1972). Noël Arnaud (ed.). Je voudrais pas crever [suivi de Lettres au Collège de 'Pataphysique et Textes sur la littérature]. Paris: 10/18. ISBN 978-2-264-00830-5. Reprinted 1989.
- Vian, Boris (1976). Noël Arnaud (ed.). Cantilènes en gelée; (précédé de) Barnum's Digest; (et suivi de) Vingt poèmes inédits; Je voudrais pas crever; (suivi de) Lettres au Collège de pataphysique; (et) Textes sur la littérature. Paris: C. Bourgois. ISBN 2-267-00023-7.
- Vian, Boris; Jacques de Loustal; et al. (2008). Je voudrais pas crever: Poèmes illustrés en hommage à Martin Matje. Montreal: Allusifs. ISBN 978-2-922868-90-6.

=== Secondary literature ===
- Alistair Rolls, "Boris Vian's Je voudrais pas crever: The Breaking of the Spine," in Grauby, Françoise; Michelle Royer (2001). Repenser les processus créateurs/Rethinking Creative Processes. Bern: Peter Lang. pp. 249–62. ISBN 978-0-8204-5069-8.
