= Michelle Léglise =

French writer, translator and secretary

Michelle Marie Léglise (June 12, 1920 – December 13, 2017), also known as Michelle Vian, was a French translator and poet.

Born in Bordeaux, she married Boris Vian in 1941, with whom she had two children, Patrick (born in 1942) and Carole (born in 1948).

She actively participates in the writing of her husband's novels and inspired the character of Chloé in Froth on the Daydream.

After the couple separated in 1953, she had a romantic relationship with Jean-Paul Sartre until the latter's death in 1980.
