= Stanley Chapman =

British architect (1925–2009)

Stanley Chapman (15 September 1925 – 26 May 2009) was a British architect, designer, translator and writer. His interests included theatre and 'pataphysics. He was involved with founding the Royal National Theatre in London, became a member of Oulipo in 1961, founder of the Outrapo, and was also a member of the Collège de Pataphysique, the London Institute of Pataphysics and the Lewis Carroll Society. In the early 1950s he contributed poems and designed covers for the literary magazines Listen and Stand, and contributed translations to Chanticleer, a magazine edited by the poet Ewart Milne. His English translation of A Hundred Thousand Billion Poems was received with "admiring stupefaction" by Raymond Queneau.

== Some publications ==
- Onze mille verbes, cent virgules Temps Mêlés n° 98, Verviers, 1969.
- Messaline au Bistrot Dragée Haute n°21. 1996. Publié par Noël Arnaud.
- Epopélerinage Dragée Haute n°35. 1999. Publié par Noël Arnaud.

== Some translations ==
- Everyone Knows by Raymond Queneau
- Darwin certainly saw the importance of the earthworm by Raymond Queneau
- Heartsnatcher by Boris Vian
- Froth on the Daydream by Boris Vian
- Autumn in Pekin by Boris Vian (unpublished)
- The Night-Watch by Arthur Rimbaud [a poem actually by Desnos] in Liberty or Love by Robert Desnos. The novel itself was translated by Terry Hale.
- Camille Renault, 1866–1954, World-Maker. by Jean Hugues Sainmont [pseudonym of Emmanuel Peillet]
- Deliquescences by Adoré Floupette
- Bibi-La-Bibiste by Raymonde Linossier
