= Heartsnatcher =

1953 novel by Boris Vian

- First edition
- Author: Boris Vian
- Original title: L'Arrache-cœur
- Translator: Stanley Chapman
- Language: French
- Publisher: Éditions Vrille
- Publication date: 1953
- Publication place: France
- English publication date: 1968
- Pages: 234

Heartsnatcher (French: L'Arrache-cœur) is a 1953 novel by French writer Boris Vian. It tells the story of a psychoanalyst who is newly arrived in a very superstitious village where absurd events occur. The heartsnatcher of the title was first described in Vian's earlier novel Froth on the daydream. It is a macabre invention, an implement to gorily extract the traditional seat of human emotions. One victim is a philosopher named Jean-Sol Partre, in reference to notable thinker Jean-Paul Sartre.

== Reception ==
The book was reviewed in Publishers Weekly in 2003: "Vian's sharp, playful humor makes for an entertaining read, although there are extended flat stretches. While the allegorical conceits may be something of an acquired taste, Vian's prose is surprisingly accessible, and his fascinating take on the strange logic of human cruelty and inconsistency makes this a worthwhile read."

== Adaptation ==
- film

== See also ==
- 1953 in literature
- 20th-century French literature
