= L'Automne à Pékin (comic book) =

2017 comic book by Paul and Gaëtan Brizzi

- Page count: 120 pages
- Publisher: Futuropolis

Creative team
- Writer: Paul and Gaëtan Brizzi, after Boris Vian
- Artist: Paul and Gaëtan Brizzi

Original publication
- Date of publication: 14 September 2017
- Language: French
- ISBN: 9782754823081

L'Automne à Pékin (lit. 'The Autumn in Peking') is a 2017 French comic book by Paul and Gaëtan Brizzi. It is based on the novel Autumn in Peking by Boris Vian and revolves around two engineers who get involved in a love triangle as they construct a railway line near an archaeological site in the 1950s. The Brizzis initially tried to make an animated feature film based on Vian's novel, announced in 2012 as under development at Les Armateurs.

The comic book was published by Futuropolis on 14 September 2017. BoDoï wrote that Vian pushed his faculty for absurdity extra far in Autumn in Peking, which does not have much of a coherent plot, and that the adaptation adds real value through its "graphic boldness".
