= Dilorom Saidaminova =

Dilorom Saidaminova (born 27 February 1943) is an Uzbek composer who also worked as a musical editor for the Uzbekistan State TV Company and taught piano at the State Conservatory of Uzbekistan.

Saidaminova was born in Tashkent. She studied music at the Uspensky Academic Lyceum in Tashkent and at the State Conservatory of Uzbekistan, where she earned a MMus in piano, a MMus in composition, and a DMA in composition. Her postgraduate studies were at the Moscow State Tchaikovsky Conservatory. Her teachers included Edison Denisov, Yuri Fortunatov, Abraham Litvinov, and Boris Zeidman. Her son is the violinist Tigran Shiganyan.

From 1967 to 1985 and from 1988 to 1995, Saidaminova taught piano at the State Conservatory of Uzbekistan. She worked as a musical editor at the Uzbekistan State TV Company from 1985 to 1988. Saidaminova is a member of the American Society of Composers, Authors, and Publishers (ASCAP) and the Composers Union in both Uzbekistan and in Russia. Her awards, commissions, and grants include:

- 1977 Outstanding Young Composer in Uzbekistan ;
- 1983 First Prize in Tashkent Competition for Holiday Overture;
- 1991 Outstanding Contributions to Culture and Music in Uzbekistan ;
- 1998 Second Prize in Organization for German/Austrian Women in The Arts (GEDOK) Competition for By the Sound of Francesca;
- 2002 grant from the Open Society Institute/Soros Foundation;
- 2002 commission from the Bach Choir of Pittsburgh for Azon;
- 2004 commission from saxophonist James Houlik for Concerto for Saxophone;
- 2021 commission from violinist Igor Kalnin for Ascending to Light.

Saidaminova has composed over 70 songs, many of them for children, as well as the following works:

== Ballet ==
- Gorinchii Kamien

== Chamber ==
- Ascending to Light (unaccompanied violin)
- Dance of the Rain (chamber orchestra)
- Mirage (folk instruments)
- Monologue (viola and piano, 1992)
- Poem-Improvisation (viola and piano, 1992)
- Shadow of the Woman (cello and chamber orchestra)
- Smell of the Night (chamber orchestra)
- Sonata No. 2 (violin and piano)
- Where There Is No Time (clarinet, violin, piano)

== Orchestra ==
- Amir Timur (orchestra and solo percussion)
- Concerto for Piano No. 2
- Concerto for Saxophone
- Fanfare
- Holiday Overture
- In Memory of My Friends
- Path to Enlightenment (orchestra and choir)
- Symphonic Poem

== Piano ==
- Dialog with Khayam
- Two Pieces for Piano
- Walls of Ancient Bukhara

== Vocal ==
- Azon (choir, organ, piano, violin and narrator)
- Path to Enlightenment (choir and orchestra)
- Saraton (soprano, violin and traditional instruments)
- "Uzbekistan"
