= The Dead All Have the Same Skin =

1947 novel by Vernon Sullivan

- First edition
- Author: Vernon Sullivan (Boris Vian)
- Original title: Les morts ont tous la même peau
- Translator: Paul Knobloch
- Language: French
- Publisher: Éditions du Scorpion
- Publication date: 1947
- Publication place: France
- English publication date: 2007
- Pages: 190

The Dead All Have the Same Skin (French: Les morts ont tous la même peau) is a 1947 crime novel by the French writer Boris Vian. It tells the story of a mixed Black-White American, who manages to have a career in "white society" without anyone knowing of his origin; when his black half-brother turns up and tries to blackmail him by threatening to reveal his origin, his life turns into a downward spiral of violence. It was the second book published under the pseudonym Vernon Sullivan, after I Spit on Your Graves from 1946.

== Reception ==
James Sallis reviewed the book in the Los Angeles Times in 2008: "Vian wrote two further Vernon Sullivan novels, in which he kicked out all the stops and skidded toward parody; neither has the authority or purchase of the first two. Reminiscent of Chester Himes' sadly neglected Run Man Run in its intensity and its protagonist's needless headlong rush to oblivion, The Dead All Have the Same Skin also verges -- with its fierce energy, candor and matter-of-fact savagery -- on Jim Thompson territory."

== See also ==
- 1947 in literature
- 20th-century French literature
