= I Spit on Your Grave (1959 film) =

1959 film

- Directed by: Michel Gast
- Written by: Jacques Dopagne; Luska Eliroff; Louis Sapin; Michel Gast; Boris Vian
- Based on: I Spit on Your Graves by Boris Vian
- Produced by: Josette Trachsler
- Starring: Christian Marquand; Antonella Lualdi; Fernand Ledoux
- Cinematography: Marc Fossard
- Edited by: Eliane Bensdorp
- Music by: Alain Goraguer
- Production companies: CTI; Société Internationale de Production de Film
- Distributed by: Lux Compagnie Cinématographique de France
- Release date: 26 June 1959
- Running time: 110 minutes
- Country: France
- Language: French

I Spit on Your Grave (French: J'irai cracher sur vos tombes) is a 1959 French crime drama film directed by Michel Gast and starring Christian Marquand, Antonella Lualdi and Fernand Ledoux. It is an adaptation of the 1946 novel of the same title by Boris Vian. It was shot at the Victorine Studios in Nice. The film's sets were designed by the art director Robert Bouladoux.

== Cast ==
- Christian Marquand as Joe Grant
- Antonella Lualdi as Lizbeth Shannon
- Fernand Ledoux as Horace Chandley
- Renate Ewert as Sylvia Shannon
- Marina Petrova as Sheila
- Daniel Cauchy as Sonny
- Catherine Fonteney as Virginia Shannon
- Claude Berri as David
- Jean Droze as Ted
- Gisèle Gallois as Mona
- Lud Germain as Harrison - Le serviteur des Shannon
- Monique Just as Jay
- Jean Sorel as Elmer
- Marie-Blanche Vergnes as Janet
- André Versini as Lex
- Paul Guers as Stan Walker

== Bibliography ==
- Bessy, Maurice & Chirat, Raymond. Histoire du cinéma français: 1956-1960. Pygmalion, 1986.
- Rège, Philippe. Encyclopedia of French Film Directors, Volume 1. Scarecrow Press, 2009.
