= Le Tabou =

Coordinates: 48°51′36″N 2°19′47″E

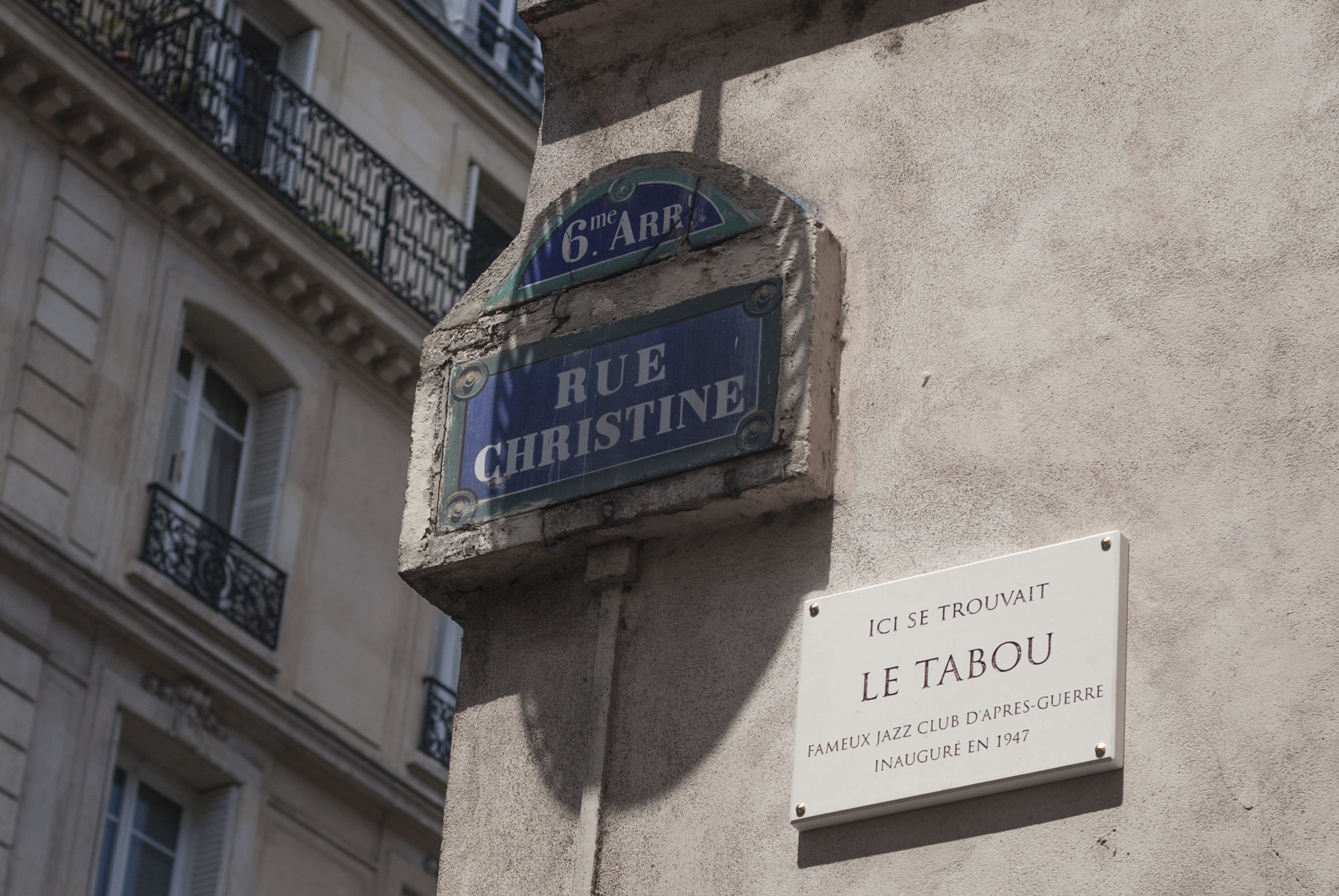
Commemorative plaque

Le Tabou was a cellar club located at 33 Rue Dauphine in Saint-Germain-des-Prés, Paris. The club opened shortly after Club des Lorientais on 11 April 1947. The Club first went unnoticed, frequented by the local press distribution service, but became famous as a haunt of the existentialists.

== Early years ==
Le Tabou operated with a late license, until 4am, which suited the local press distribution service. The nighthawks began to frequent the cafe in 1945, attracted by the late night opening when leaving Le Flore or Les Deux Magots.

September 1946 saw the 'intellectualizing' of Le Tabou. Poets including Tousky, Camille Bryen and de Beaumont began to frequent the cafe alongside painters such as Desseau and Wols. The neighbourhood writers including Queneau, Sartre, Camus and Pichette became regular patrons.

== Jazz ==
Jazz established itself in this underground haven with a trio composed of Boris Vian and his two brothers alongside anyone else with a desire to play. "This smoke-filled dive was to become a veritable legend on the Saint-Germain scene, providing a meeting-point for young bohemians, as well as a host of famous musicians and artists. Boris Vian was a regular at Le Tabou, as were Jean Cocteau and the legendary jazz trumpet-player Miles Davis. Needless to say, Juliette Gréco also made it her local haunt."

== Decline ==
"From July to August 1947 the party was in full stride. Agitated by the noise made by the late night clients as they left, the residents of Rue Dauphine had for sometime been enthusiastically emptying their chamberpots onto the heads of the imprudent customers. This only caused the clamor of the crowd to grow louder"

Complaints from residents caused Le Tabou's late license to be revoked and the club was forced to close at midnight. The opening of the late night cellar club at 13 Rue Saint-Benoit coincided with Le Tabou's decline.
