= Edison Denisov =

Russian composer (1929–1996)

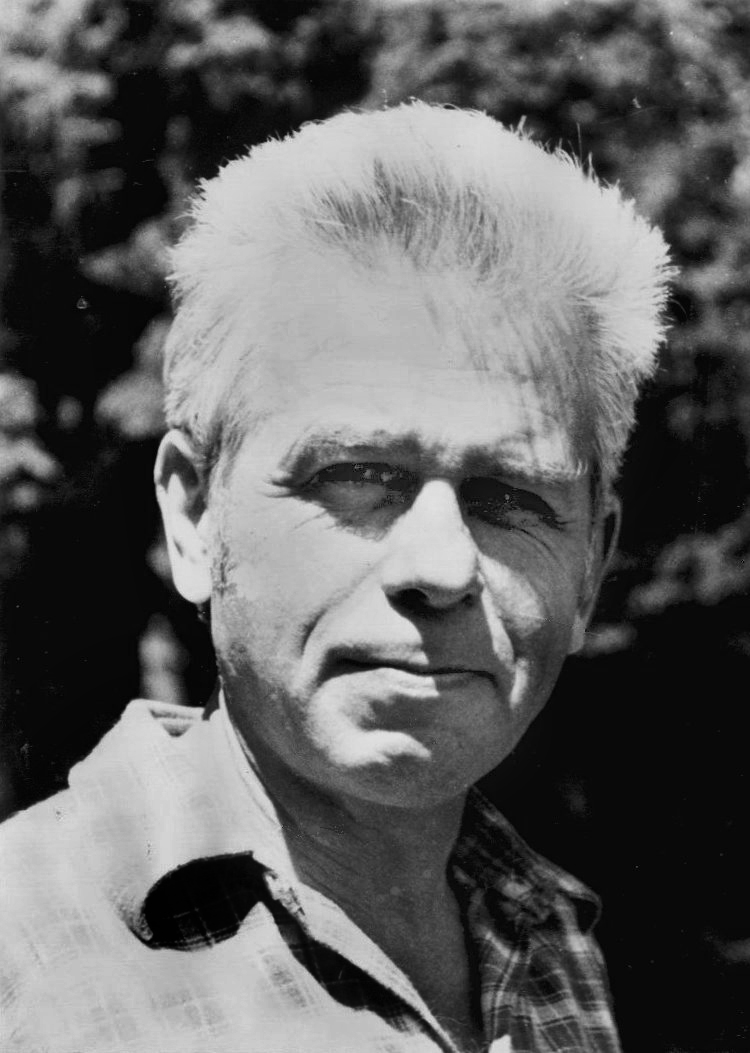
Edison Denisov in Sortavala, summer 1975. Photo by Dmitri Smirnov.

Edison Vasilyevich Denisov (Russian: Эдисо́н Васи́льевич Дени́сов, 6 April 1929 – 24 November 1996) was a Russian composer in the Underground, alternative or nonconformist division of Soviet music.

== Biography ==
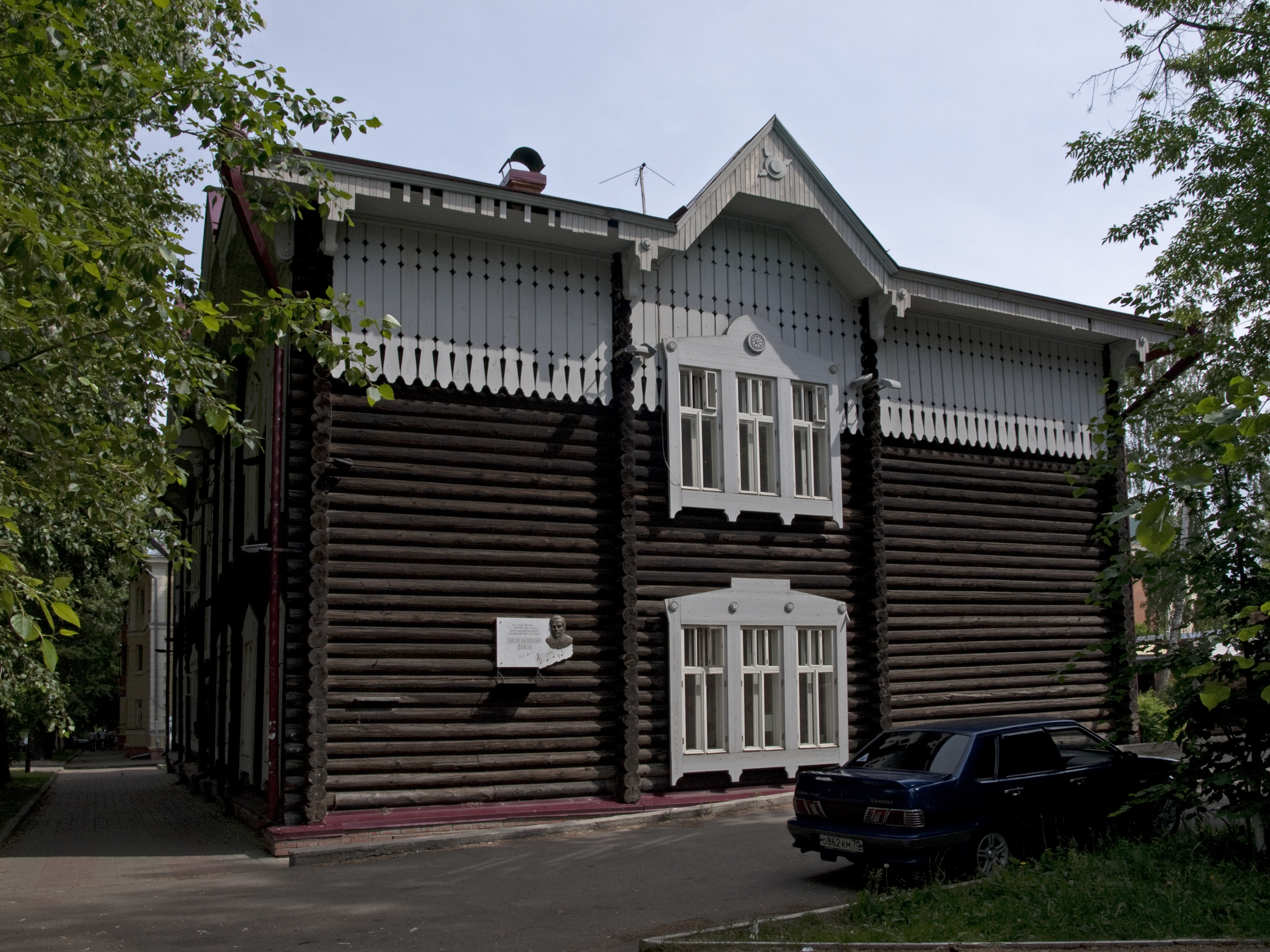
The house in Tomsk where Denisov was born; the memorial plaque is visible.

Denisov was born in Tomsk, Siberia. He studied mathematics before deciding to spend his life composing. This decision was enthusiastically supported by Dmitri Shostakovich, who gave him lessons in composition.

In 1951–56 Denisov studied at the Moscow Conservatory: composition with Vissarion Shebalin, orchestration with Nikolai Rakov, analysis with Viktor Tsukkerman and piano with Vladimir Belov. In 1956–59 he composed the opera Ivan-Soldat (Soldier Ivan) in three acts based on Russian folk fairy tales.

He began his own study of scores that were difficult to obtain in the USSR at that time, including music by composers ranging from Mahler and Debussy to Boulez and Stockhausen. He wrote a series of articles giving a detailed analysis of different aspects of contemporary compositional techniques and at same time actively experimented as a composer, trying to find his own way.

After graduating from the Moscow Conservatory, he taught orchestration and later composition there. His pupils included the composers Dmitri Smirnov, Elena Firsova, Dilorom Saidaminova, Vladimir Tarnopolsky, Sergey Pavlenko, Ivan Sokolov, Yuri Kasparov. He supported and encouraged Dmitri Capyrin and Alexander Shchetynsky who have never been his pupils. See: List of music students by teacher: C to F#Edison Denisov.

In 1979, at the Sixth Congress of the Union of Soviet Composers, he was blacklisted as one of "Khrennikov's Seven" for unapproved participation in a number of festivals of Soviet music in the West.

Denisov became a leader of the Association for Contemporary Music reestablished in Moscow in 1990. Later he moved to France, where after an accident and long illness he died in a Saint-Mandé hospital in 1996.

== Music ==
Denisov's cycle for soprano and chamber ensemble Le soleil des Incas (1964), setting poems by Gabriela Mistral and dedicated to Pierre Boulez, brought him international recognition following a series of successful performances of the work in Darmstadt and Paris (1965). Igor Stravinsky liked the piece, discovering the "remarkable talent" of its composer. However, it was harshly criticised by the Union of Soviet Composers for its "western influences", "erudition instead of creativity", and "total composer's arbitrary" (Tikhon Khrennikov). After that, performances of his works were frequently banned in the Soviet Union.

Later he wrote a flute concerto for Aurèle Nicolet, a violin concerto for Gidon Kremer, works for the oboist Heinz Holliger, clarinettist Eduard Brunner and a sonata for alto saxophone and piano for Jean-Marie Londeix, that became highly popular among saxophone players.

His sombre but striking Requiem, setting a multi-lingual text (English, French, German, and Latin) based on works by the Francisco Tanzer, was given its first performance in Hamburg in 1980.

Among his major works are the operas L'écume des jours after Boris Vian (1981), Quatre Filles after Pablo Picasso (1986) and ballet Confession after Alfred de Musset.

== Awards and honours ==
- People's Artist of Russia (29 December 1994)
- Honoured Worker of the Arts Industry of the RSFSR (1989)
- Chevalier of the Legion of Honour
- Commander of the Order of Arts and Letters

== Selected works ==
Chamber

- 1958 Sonata for Two Violins
- 1958 Three concert pieces for violin and piano
- 1960 Sonata for Flute and Piano
- 1961 String quartet no. 2
- 1963 Concerto for flute, oboe, piano and percussion
- 1963 Violin sonata
- 1968 Ode (in Memory of Che Guevara) for clarinet, piano and percussion
- 1968 Musique Romantique (Романтическая музыка—Romantic Music) for oboe, harp and string trio
- 1969 String trio
- 1969 Wind quintet for flute, oboe, clarinet, bassoon and horn
- 1969 Silhouettes for flute, two pianos and percussion
- 1969 Chant des Oiseaux (Пение птиц) for prepared piano (or harpsichord) and tape
- 1969 DSCH for clarinet, trombone, cello and piano
- 1969 The Singing of the Birds for the ANS photoelectronic synthesizer
- 1970 Sonata for alto saxophone and piano
- 1971 Piano Trio
- 1972 Sonatina for violin
- 1972 Sonata for clarinet solo
- 1974 Signes en blanc (Знаки на белом—The Signs on White) for piano
- 1975 Choral Varié for trombone and piano
- 1983 Five Etudes for Solo Bassoon
- 1984 Variations on Bach chorale "Es ist genung" for viola and piano (or chamber orchestra)
- 1985 Three Pictures after Paul Klee for viola, oboe, horn, piano, vibraphone and double bass
- 1987 Clarinet Quintet
- 1987 Piano quintet
- 1991 Four pieces for string quartet
- 1991 Octet for winds
- 1991 Quintet for saxophone quartet and piano
- 1993 Sonata for clarinet and piano
- 1994 Sonata for alto saxophone and cello
- 1995 Trio for flute, bassoon and piano
- 1995 Des ténèbres à la lumière (From Dusk to Light) for accordion
- 1996 Sonata for two flutes (May)
- 1996 Femme et oiseaux (The Woman and the Birds) homage to Joan Miró for piano, string quartet and woodwind quartet
- 1996 Avant le coucher du soleil for alto flute and vibraphone

Concertos

- 1972 Cello Concerto
- 1975 Piano Concerto
- 1975 Flute Concerto
- 1977 Violin Concerto
- 1977 Concerto Piccolo for saxophone and six percussionists
- 1978 Concerto for flute, oboe, and orchestra
- 1982 Variations for cello and orchestra on Haydn's Canon Tod ist ein langer Schlaf
- 1982 Chamber music for viola, harpsichord, and strings
- 1982 Concerto for bassoon, cello and orchestra
- 1984 Concerto for 2 violas, harpsichord, and strings
- 1985 Happy ending for 2 violins, cello, double bass and string orchestra
- 1986 Viola Concerto
- 1986 Oboe Concerto
- 1989 Clarinet Concerto
- 1991 Guitar Concerto
- 1993 Concerto for flute, vibraphone, harpsichord and string orchestra
- 1996 Concerto for flute, clarinet and orchestra

Symphonic

- 1958 Little suite
- 1970 Peinture (Живопись—Painting) for orchestra
- 1982 Chamber Symphony No. 1
- 1983 Epitaph for chamber orchestra
- 1985 Suite from the Ballet Confession
- 1986 Waltz by Franz Schubert
- 1987 Symphony No. 1
- 1994 Chamber Symphony No. 2
- 1996 Symphony No. 2

Choral/Vocal

- 1964 Le soleil des Incas (Солнце инков—The Sun of Incas), text by Gabriela Mistral for soprano, flute, oboe, horn, trumpet, two pianos, percussion, violin and cello
- 1964 Italian Songs, text by Alexander Blok for soprano, flute, horn, violin and harpsichord
- 1966 Les pleurs (Плачи—Lamentations), text of Russian folksongs for soprano, piano and three percussionists
- 1966 Five stories of Mr. Keuner (B. Brecht) for tenor and small ensemble
- 1968 Autumn (Осень) after Velimir Khlebnikov for thirteen solo voices
- 1970 Two Songs after poems by Ivan Bunin for soprano and piano
- 1973 La vie en rouge (Жизнь в красном цвете—The Life in Red), text by Boris Vian for solo voice, flute, clarinet, violin, cello, piano and percussion
- 1980 Requiem after liturgian texts and poems by Francisco Tanzer for soprano, tenor, mixed chorus and orchestra
- 1981 Song of Autumn for soprano and orchestra
- 1986 Aux plus haut des cieux for soprano and chamber orchestra
- 1988 Legends of the subterranean waters for chorus
- 1988 Peaceful Light for chorus
- 1989 Four Poems after Gérard de Nerval for voice, flute and piano
- 1991 Kyrie for choir and orchestra after fragment from Mozart K.323
- 1992 History of Life and Death of Our Lord Jesus Christus according to St. Matthew for bass, tenor, chorus and orchestra
- 1995 Choruses for Medea for chorus and ensemble
- 1995 Morning Dream after seven poems of Rose Ausländer for soprano, mixed chorus and orchestra

Opera

- 1956–9 Soldier Ivan (Russian: Иван-солдат) opera in three acts after motifs from Russian folk fairy tales
- 1981 L'écume des jours (Пена дней—The Foam of Days), an opera after Boris Vian
- 1986 Quatre Filles (Четыре девушки—The Four Girls), an opera in one act after Pablo Picasso

Ballet

- 1984 Confession (Исповедь), a ballet in three acts after Alfred de Musset

Arrangements/Completions

- 1981 Arrangement of Bach Partita BWV 1004, for violin and orchestra
- 1985 Arrangements of 5 Paganini Caprices op. 1, for violin and string orchestra
- 1993 Completion of Debussy's opera Rodrigue et Chimène
- 1995 Completion of Schubert's opera-oratorio Lazarus oder Die Feier der Auferstehung (Лазарь и торжество Воскрешения) D689
- 1996 Three Cadenzas for Mozart's Concerto for flute and harp

Film music

- 1965 Lebedev against Lebedev
- 1977 The Scarlet Flower
- 1980 An Ideal Husband
- 1983 Twice Born
- 1989 The Feasts of Belshazzar, or a Night with Stalin
- 1990 The Suicide

== Bibliography ==
- Armengaud J.-P. Entretiens avec Denisov, un compositeur sous le régime soviétique. P., 1993 (in French)
- Kholopov Yu., Tsenova V. (1995). Edison Denisov. Harwood Academic publ. (in English) || Edison Denisov — The Russian Voice in European New Music. Berlin: Kuhn. 2002. (in English)
- Yuri Kholopov & Valeria Tsenova: Edison Denisov — The Russian Voice in European New Music; Berlin, Kuhn, 2002 (in English)
- Холопов Ю., Ценова B. (1993). Эдисон Денисов. М.: Композитор. (in Russian)
- Brian Luce: Light from Behind the Iron Curtain: Anti-Collectivist Style in Edison Denisov's "Quatre Pièces pour Flûte et Piano;" UMI, Ann Arbor, 2000 (in English)
- Peter Schmelz: Listening, Memory, and the Thaw: Unofficial Music and Society in the Soviet Union, 1956–1974, PhD Dissertation, University of California (Richard Taruskin, advisor), 2002 (in English)
- Peter Schmelz: Such Freedom, If Only Musical. Oxford University Press, 2009 (in English)
- Ekaterina Kouprovskaia : Edison Denisov, monographie. Aedam Musicae, 2017 (in French)
- Купровская Е. Мой муж Эдисон Денисов. — М.: Музыка, 2014 (in Russian)
- Ценова B. Неизвестный Денисов. М., 1997 (in Russian)
- Шульгин Д. И. (1998). Признание Эдисона Денисова. М.: Композитор. Признание Эдисона Денисова (2-е изд ed.). М.: ИД «Композитор». 2004. (in Russian)
- Свет. Добро. Вечность. Памяти Э. Денисова. Статьи. Воспоминания. Материалы. М. 1999 (in Russian)
