= St. Louis Symphony Orchestra =

American symphony orchestra

- Orchestra
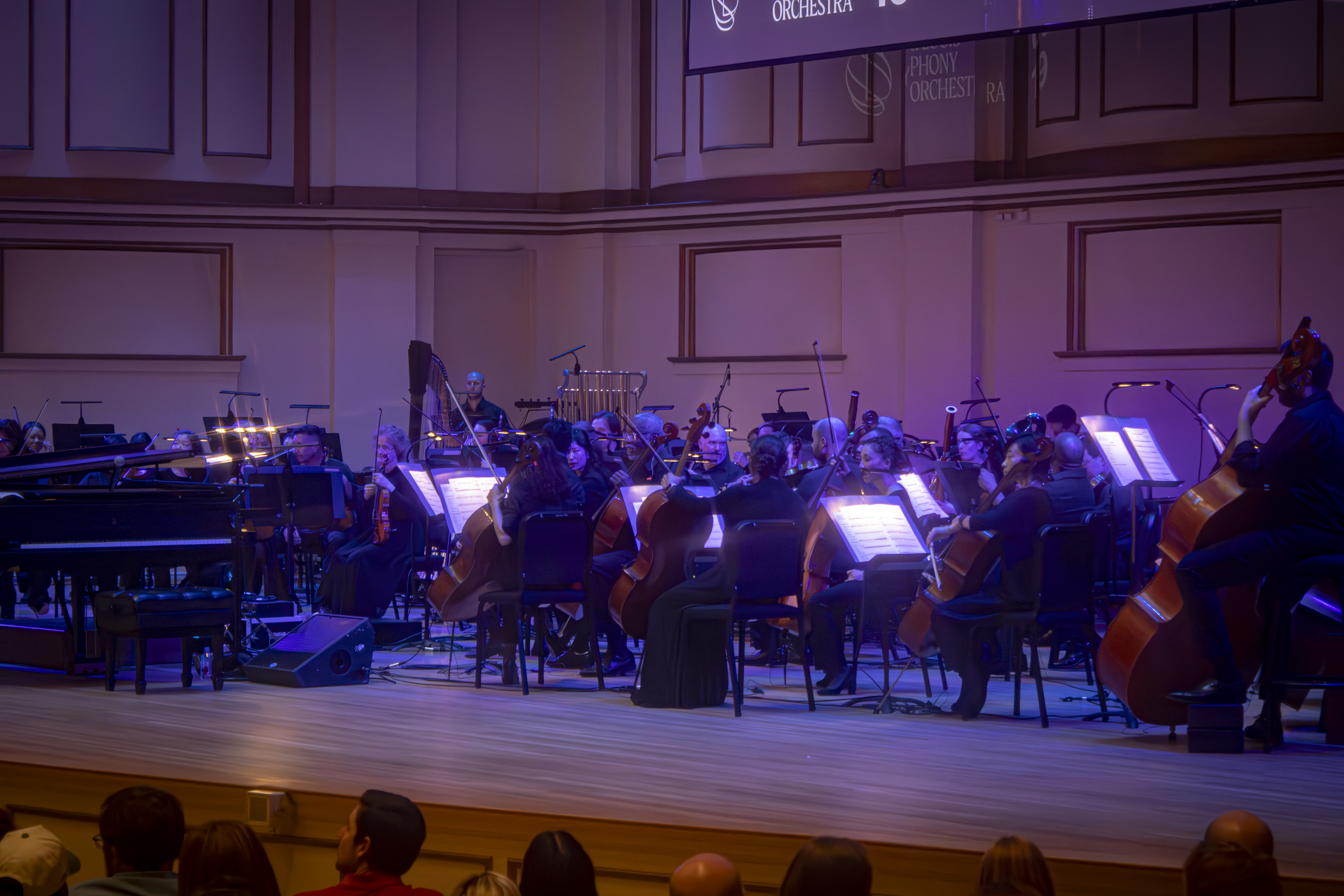
- Members of the St. Louis Symphony Orchestra warming up before a show in 2026
- Former name: St. Louis Choral-Symphony; Saint Louis Symphony Orchestra
- Founded: 1880; 146 years ago
- Concert hall: Powell Hall
- Principal conductor: Stéphane Denève
- Website: www.slso.org

The St. Louis Symphony Orchestra (SLSO) is an American symphony orchestra based in St. Louis, Missouri. Founded in 1880 by Joseph Otten as the St. Louis Choral Society, it is the second-oldest professional symphony orchestra in the United States, preceded only by the New York Philharmonic. Its principal concert venue is Powell Hall, located in midtown St. Louis.

== History ==
The St. Louis Choral Society performed in the auditorium of the St. Louis Mercantile Library at Locust and Broadway in Downtown St. Louis. During the 1881/82 season the 80-member chorus was joined by an orchestra of 31 members. A disbanded Musical Union joined the group. In 1893, the St. Louis Choral-Symphony was formally incorporated. It remained largely a choral organization through its performances at the 1904 World's Fair under Alfred Ernst when it expanded to a 200-member chorus and an orchestra of 55. Under Max Zach's tenure (1907 to 1921), it changed its name to the Saint Louis Symphony Orchestra.

Before moving to its current home in Powell Hall, the SLSO performed for many years at the Kiel Opera House. The orchestra has given concerts regularly at Carnegie Hall and has made overseas tours to Europe and to Japan. The St. Louis Symphony has recorded for the Columbia, RCA Victor, Red Seal, Telarc, Vox/Turnabout, Angel EMI, and Nonesuch labels. It has also issued CD recordings on its own label, Arch Media, and has received seven Grammy Awards and 58 nominations. For Opera Theatre of Saint Louis, the St. Louis Symphony has been the resident orchestra since 1978, divided into two ensembles, each performing two of the operas in the season. Also associated with the orchestra is the St. Louis Symphony Chorus, which was founded in 1977. Its first director was Thomas Peck.

The national prestige of the St. Louis Symphony grew most prominently during the music directorship of Leonard Slatkin, from 1979 to 1996. During his tenure, the orchestra made many recordings for the EMI and RCA Victor labels, and toured to Europe and the Far East, as well as concerts at Carnegie Hall. However, this growth in prestige was not matched by stabilization of long-term finances. In 2000, the SLSO's endowment stood at US$28 million. In 2000, the executive director and President of the SLSO at the time, Don Roth, had secured a US$40 million challenge grant from the Taylor family (owners of privately held Enterprise Rent-A-Car) to help the organization's money situation. However, in that same year, he revealed the situation of severe financial problems with the St. Louis Symphony Orchestra finances, which nearly led to the orchestra's bankruptcy in 2001. Roth resigned his position in July 2001, and was succeeded by Randy Adams, a former St. Louis bank executive. Adams embarked on extensive fund-raising efforts in the following years, seeking to enlarge the SLSO's endowment in the process. As part of the budget cuts and cost-saving measures, the musicians agreed to salary cuts over that time, and also a reduction of their 52-week contract to 42 weeks.

Following the departure of Hans Vonk as music director after the 2001–2002 season, Itzhak Perlman served as music adviser to the orchestra from 2002 to 2004. In December 2003, the symphony's board announced David Robertson as the next music director of the orchestra, effective with the 2005/06 season.

In January 2005, a labor dispute led to a cancellation of concerts for two months. Before the musicians could vote on the terms of the new contract, management changed the locks to Powell Hall without notifying them. Auditions were cancelled, and the health insurance for musicians was cancelled without notice as well. Whilst the musicians considered themselves to be 'locked out', management considered this action to be an illegal strike, since the players' attorney, Leonard Leibowitz, had advised them against filing certain documents as required by law. The National Labor Relations Board agreed with management. After a two-month period of negotiations, the musicians agreed to a ten-week reduction from a 52-week season, and 30% wage reductions. Upon returning to the stage, the musicians enacted a "Vote of No Confidence" on Executive Director Randy Adams. Both parties then reached a mutual agreement under which they agreed to refer to the eight-week period as a "Work Stoppage" and the "Vote of No Confidence" was rescinded. In March 2005, the musicians and Adams agreed to a new contract.

From 2005 to 2018, the SLSO music director was David Robertson. During Robertson's tenure, the St. Louis Symphony Orchestra has partnered with St. Louis Public Radio to broadcast its subscription concerts live every Saturday night during its regular season, since the fall of 2010, after the sale of the St. Louis classical radio station KFUO. Robertson conducted the orchestra's first-ever appearance at The Proms in September 2012. In 2013, Robertson's contract was extended through the 2015/16 season, and a further contract extension, announced in March 2014, was through the 2017/18 season. Robertson's tenure as SLSO music director concluded at the end of the 2017/2018 season.

Adams stood-down as the orchestra's president and executive director in June 2007. Fred Bronstein assumed the posts in March 2008. Faced with declining ticket sales and deficits, Bronstein immediately launched an aggressive new revenue plan with audience development at the core of its actions. Bronstein also took steps to broaden and diversify the symphony's programming through popularly oriented programming series such as "Live at Powell Hall". Since 2008, because of new programming and marketing strategies, ticket revenues have grown 39% in the 2012 fiscal year, the highest revenues in over a decade, while seats sold grew by 16% and more than 31,000 new people were added to the customer base, reversing five years of decline. Because of successful audience development initiatives at the core of the plan as well as other revenue progress and strong management of expenses, the structural deficit (whose gaps are funded by additional contributions) has declined 18% from $3.4M in 2007 to $2.8M in 2011, dipping as low as $2.62m in 2010.

Bronstein left the SLSO to head the Peabody Conservatory in the spring of 2014. In February 2015, the SLSO named Marie-Hélène Bernard, then-president of the Handel and Haydn Society as its new president and CEO, effective July 1, 2015.

In 2003, Stéphane Denève first guest-conducted the orchestra. In June 2017, the orchestra named Denève as its next music director, effective with the 2019–2020 season, with an initial contract of three seasons. He held the title of Music Director Designate for the 2018–2019 season. In March 2021, the orchestra announced the extension of Denève's contract as its music director through the 2025–2026 season.

In March 2022, the orchestra announced plans for a renovation of Powell Hall, to begin in 2023. During the scheduled renovation period, the orchestra has been performing concerts principally at the Touhill Performing Arts Center of the University of Missouri–St. Louis and also at the Stifel Theatre. In September 2024, the orchestra announced its intention to name its renovated music complex as the Jack C. Taylor Music Center, with the concert hall to retain the name of Powell Hall.

== Awards ==
In its 140-year history, the St. Louis Symphony Orchestra has earned nine Grammy Awards out of 60 nominations from the National Academy of Recording Arts and Sciences.

| Year | Category | Works | Conductor | Additional Nominees | Result |
|---|---|---|---|---|---|
| 1978 | Best Classical Performance - Choral | Prokofiev: Alexander Nevsky | Leonard Slatkin | Thomas Peck, Chorus director | Nominated |
| 1978 | Best Engineered Recording - Classical | Prokofiev: Alexander Nevsky | Leonard Slatkin | Marc Aubort, Joanna Nickrenz | Nominated |
| 1978 | Best Classical Performance - Orchestra | Rachmaninoff: Symphony No. 1 | Leonard Slatkin | | Nominated |
| 1979 | Best Classical Performance - Orchestra | Rachmaninoff: Symphony Nos. 2 & 3 | Leonard Slatkin | | Nominated |
| 1979 | Best Engineered Recording - Classical | Rachmaninoff: Symphony Nos. 2 & 3 | Leonard Slatkin | Marc Aubort, Joanna Nickrenz | Nominated |
| 1979 | Classical Producer of the Year | Rachmaninoff: Symphony No. 3 | Leonard Slatkin | Marc Aubort, Joanna Nickrenz | Nominated |
| 1979 | Best Classical Performance - Choral | Beethoven: "Choral Fantasy," "Elegiac Song," "Calm Sea and Prosperous Voyage" | Jerzy Semkow | Thomas Peck, Chorus director | Nominated |
| 1980 | Classical Producer of the Year | Bizet: Carmen Suites 1 and 2; Grieg: Peer Gynt Suites 1 and 2 | Leonard Slatkin | Robert Woods | Won |
| 1981 | Best Classical Performance - Choral | Prokofiev: Music from the films, Ivan the Terrible | Leonard Slatkin | Thomas Peck, Chorus director | Nominated |
| 1982 | Best Classical Performance - Orchestra | Debussy: La Mer, Prelude a l'apres midi d'un Faune, Danses Sacre et Profane | Leonard Slatkin | | Nominated |
| 1982 | Best Classical Album | Debussy: La Mer, Prelude a l'apres midi d'un Faune, Danses Sacre et Profane | Leonard Slatkin | | Nominated |
| 1982 | Classical Producer of the Year | Debussy: La Mer, Prelude a l'apres midi d'un Faune, Danses Sacre et Profane | Leonard Slatkin | Robert Woods | Won |
| 1982 | Best Classical Performance - Choral | Rachmaninoff: The Bells, "Three Russian Songs" | Leonard Slatkin | Thomas Peck, Chorus director | Nominated |
| 1983 | Best Classical Orchestral Recording | Del Tredici: In Memory of a Summer Day (Child Alice, Part 1) | Leonard Slatkin | | Nominated |
| 1983 | Best Engineered Recording - Classical | Del Tredici: In Memory of a Summer Day (Child Alice, Part 1) | Leonard Slatkin | Marc Aubort | Nominated |
| 1983 | Classical Producer of the Year | Del Tredici: In Memory of a Summer Day (Child Alice, Part 1) | Leonard Slatkin | Marc Aubort, Joanna Nickrenz | Won |
| 1984 | Best Classical Orchestral Recording | Prokofiev: Symphony No. 5 | Leonard Slatkin | | Won |
| 1984 | Best Engineered Recording - Classical | Prokofiev: Symphony No. 5 | Leonard Slatkin | Paul Goodman | Won |
| 1984 | Best Classical Album | Prokofiev: Symphony No. 5 | Leonard Slatkin | | Nominated |
| 1984 | Classical Producer of the Year | Prokofiev: Symphony No. 5 | Leonard Slatkin | Jay David Saks | Nominated |
| 1985 | Best Classical Album | Prokofiev: Cinderella Suite | Leonard Slatkin | | Nominated |
| 1985 | Best Classical Orchestral Recording | Prokofiev: Cinderella Suite | Leonard Slatkin | | Nominated |
| 1985 | Best Engineered Recording - Classical | Prokofiev: Cinderella Suite | Leonard Slatkin | Paul Goodman | Nominated |
| 1985 | Classical Producer of the Year | Prokofiev: Cinderella Suite; Tchaikovsky: The Nutcracker | Leonard Slatkin | Jay David Saks | Nominated |
| 1985 | Best Engineered Recording - Classical | Tchaikovsky: The Nutcracker | Leonard Slatkin | Paul Goodman, Thomas MacCluskey | Nominated |
| 1986 | Best Classical Album | Copland: Billy the Kid and Rodeo | Leonard Slatkin | | Nominated |
| 1986 | Best Classical Orchestral Recording | Copland: Billy the Kid and Rodeo | Leonard Slatkin | | Nominated |
| 1986 | Best Engineered Recording - Classical | Copland: Billy the Kid and Rodeo | Leonard Slatkin | Marc Aubort | Nominated |
| 1986 | Classical Producer of the Year | Copland: Billy the Kid and Rodeo | Leonard Slatkin | Marc Aubort, Joanna Nickrenz | Nominated |
| 1986 | Classical Producer of the Year | Shostakovich: Symphony No. 5 | Leonard Slatkin | Jay David Saks | Nominated |
| 1987 | Best Classical Album | Hanson: Symphony No. 2, "Romantic"; Barber: Violin Concerto | Leonard Slatkin | | Nominated |
| 1987 | Best Classical Orchestral Recording | Hanson: Symphony No. 2, "Romantic" | Leonard Slatkin | | Nominated |
| 1987 | Best Classical Performance - Instrumental Soloist with Orchestra | Barber: Violin Concerto | Leonard Slatkin | Elmar Oliveira, violin | Nominated |
| 1987 | Best Contemporary Composition | Schwantner: A Sudden Rainbow | Leonard Slatkin | | Nominated |
| 1987 | Classical Producer of the Year | Brahms: Serenade No. 1; Shostakovich: Symphony No. 10 | Leonard Slatkin | Jay David Saks | Nominated |
| 1988 | Best Classical Orchestral Recording | Copland: Appalachian Spring | Leonard Slatkin | | Nominated |
| 1988 | Classical Producer of the Year | Copland: Appalachian Spring | Leonard Slatkin | Joanna Nickrenz | Nominated |
| 1988 | Best Contemporary Composition | Bolcom: Symphony No. 4 | Leonard Slatkin | Joan Morris, mezzo-soprano | Nominated |
| 1989 | Best Classical Performance - Instrumental Soloist with Orchestra | Schuman: Violin Concerto; Bernstein: Serenade | Leonard Slatkin | Robert McDuffie, violin | Nominated |
| 1989 | Classical Producer of the Year | Schuman: Violin Concerto; Bernstein: Serenade | Leonard Slatkin | Patti Laursen | Nominated |
| 1990 | Best Classical Orchestral Recording | Shostakovich: Symphony No. 8 | Leonard Slatkin | | Nominated |
| 1990 | Best Engineered Recording - Classical | Shostakovich: Symphony No. 8 | Leonard Slatkin | William Hoekstra | Nominated |
| 1991 | Best Classical Album | Barber: Symphony No. 1 and Piano Concerto | Leonard Slatkin | | Nominated |
| 1991 | Best Classical Performance - Instrumental Soloist with Orchestra | Barber: Symphony No. 1 and Piano Concerto | Leonard Slatkin | John Browning, piano | Won |
| 1991 | Best Engineered Recording - Classical | Barber: Symphony No. 1 and Piano Concerto | Leonard Slatkin | William Hoekstra | Nominated |
| 1991 | Best Orchestral Performance | Copland: Symphony No. 3 | Leonard Slatkin | | Nominated |
| 1991 | Best Classical Performance - Instrumental Soloist with Orchestra | Bartok: Violin/Viola Concertos | Leonard Slatkin | Pinchas Zuckerman, violin | Nominated |
| 1992 | Best Classical Orchestral Recording | Schuman: Symphony No. 10, New England Triptych, American Festival Overture, Variations on America (orch. Ives) | Leonard Slatkin | | Nominated |
| 1993 | Best Orchestral Performance | Ives: Symphony No. 3 | Leoanrd Slatkin | | Nominated |
| 1993 | Best Contemporary Composition | Erb: Concerto for Brass and Orchestra | Leoanrd Slatkin | | Nominated |
| 1994 | Best Engineered Recording - Classical | Bartok: The Miraculous Mandarin and Concerto for Orchestra | Leonard Slatkin | William Hoekstra | Nominated |
| 1994 | Best Engineered Recording - Classical | Copland: Music for Films | Leonard Slatkin | William Hoekstra | Won |
| 1995 | Best Engineered Recording - Classical | Anderson: The Typewriter: Leroy Anderson Favorites | Leonard Slaktin | William Hoekstra | Nominated |
| 1995 | Best Engineered Recording - Classical | Orff: Carmina Burana | Leonard Slaktin | William Hoekstra | Nominated |
| 1996 | Best Classical Album | Copland: Dance Symphony, Short Symphony, Organ Symphony | Leonard Slatkin | | Nominated |
| 1996 | Best Engineered Recording - Classical | Copland: Dance Symphony, Short Symphony, Organ Symphony | Leonard Slatkin | Lawrence Rock, Williams Hoekstra | Nominated |
| 1996 | Classical Producer of the Year | Copland: Dance Symphony, Short Symphony, Organ Symphony | Leonard Slatkin | Joanna Nickrenz | Won |
| 2015 | Best Orchestral Performance | Adams: City Noir and Saxophone Concerto | David Robertson | Tim McAllister, saxophone | Won |
| 2015 | Best Engineered Album - Classical | Adams: City Noir and Saxophone Concerto | David Robertson | Richard King | Nominated |
| 2016 | Best Classical Instrumental Solo | Adams: Scheherazade.2 | David Robertson | Leila Josefowicz, violin | Nominated |

== St. Louis Symphony Youth Orchestra ==
Leonard Slatkin established the St. Louis Symphony Youth Orchestra in 1970. The orchestra's assistant conductor (known also in the past as resident conductor) also acts as music director of the St. Louis Symphony Youth Orchestra. Past St. Louis Symphony Orchestra Assistant Conductors have included Slatkin, Gerhardt Zimmermann, David Loebel, David Amado, Scott Parkman, Ward Stare, Steven Jarvi, and Gemma New. In December 2020, the SLSO announced the appointment of Stephanie Childress as its next assistant conductor and music director of the St. Louis Symphony Youth Orchestra, effective with the 2021–2022 season. Childress concluded her tenure with the orchestra at the close of the 2022–2023 season. In July 2024, the SLSO announced the appointment of Samuel Hollister as its next assistant conductor and music director of the St. Louis Symphony Youth Orchestra, effective with the 2024–2025 season.

== Chorus ensembles ==
The St. Louis Symphony Orchestra houses two choral ensembles: the St. Louis Symphony Chorus and the IN UNISON Chorus. Founded in 1977 by music director Jerzy Semkow and its first director, Thomas Peck, the St. Louis Symphony Chorus is an orchestral chorus that performs in major concerts throughout each season, usually featured in choral symphonies. Peck served as director of the St. Louis Symphony Chorus until his death in 1994. Amy Kaiser succeeded Peck as director of the St. Louis Symphony Chorus, from 1995 to 2022. In February 2024, Erin Freeman made her first appearance as guest chorus director with the SLSO and the St. Louis Symphony Chorus. In July 2024, the SLSO announced the appointment of Freeman as the next director of the St. Louis Symphony Chorus, with immediate effect.

The IN UNISON Chorus was established in 1994 by Robert Ray, and performs a variety of musical styles; it primarily focuses on the music of African-American and African cultures, notably gospel music, and partners with several churches in the St. Louis area. The IN UNISON Chorus is currently directed by Kevin McBeth, who is also director of music at Manchester United Methodist Church in suburban St. Louis. The ensemble celebrated its 25th anniversary during the 2018/2019 season.

The St. Louis Symphony Orchestra also features the Holiday Festival Chorus, consisting of high-school-aged singers from across the St. Louis region, performing at holiday concerts each season.

== Music directors ==
- Joseph Otten (1880–1894)
- Alfred Ernst (1894–1907)
- Max Zach (1907–1921)
- Rudolph Ganz (1921–1927)
- Vladimir Golschmann (1931–1958)
- Edouard van Remoortel (1958–1962)
- Eleazar de Carvalho (1963–1968)
- Walter Susskind (1968–1975)
- Jerzy Semkow (1975–1979)
- Leonard Slatkin (1979–1996)
- Hans Vonk (1996–2002)
- David Robertson (2005–2018)
- Stéphane Denève (2019–present)
