= Mood Indigo (film) =

- French theatrical release poster
- Directed by: Michel Gondry
- Screenplay by: Luc Bossi; Michel Gondry
- Based on: Froth on the Daydream by Boris Vian
- Produced by: Luc Bossi
- Starring: Romain Duris; Audrey Tautou; Gad Elmaleh; Omar Sy; Aïssa Maïga; Charlotte Le Bon
- Cinematography: Christophe Beaucarne
- Edited by: Marie-Charlotte Moreau
- Music by: Étienne Charry
- Production companies: Brio Films; SCOPE Invest; Scope Pictures; Cinémag 7
- Distributed by: StudioCanal
- Release date: 24 April 2013
- Running time: 131 minutes
- Countries: France; Belgium
- Language: French
- Budget: $24 million
- Box office: $10.4 million

Mood Indigo (French: L'écume des jours, lit. "The froth of days") is a 2013 French surrealistic romantic science fantasy tragedy film co-written and directed by Michel Gondry and co-written and produced by Luc Bossi, starring Romain Duris and Audrey Tautou. It is an adaptation of Boris Vian's 1947 novel with the same French title, translated Froth on the Daydream when first published in English in 1967. It was published as Mood Indigo in the 1968 version.

The film received two nominations at the 4th Magritte Awards. It also received three nominations at the 39th César Awards, winning in one category.

== Plot ==
Colin leads a very pleasant life: he has money, he has a talented cook (Nicolas), and he loves his pianocktail (portmanteau of piano and cocktail, a word invented by Vian).

One day while having lunch with Chick, Chick tells him that he met a girl named Alise with whom he has a common passion: the writer Jean-Sol Partre (a spoonerism of Jean-Paul Sartre who was Boris Vian's friend). Colin meets Chloe at a party Chick invited him to. They fall in love, marry, but Chloe becomes ill during their honeymoon due to a water lily entering her mouth and embedding itself inside her lung while she's sleeping. Colin attempts to wither the water lily by surrounding Chloe with many fresh and beautiful flowers but as time passes, Chloe's condition deteriorates while the relationship between Chick and Alise turns sour due to Chick's continued devotion to Partre's works. Frustrated with their own deteriorating relationships, Colin and Alise sleep with each other, although they both come to regret it shortly after.

The aesthetic of the film changes from colorful and whimsical to monochromatic and tragic as the film progresses. These effects are observed most acutely in Colin's home, which decays supernaturally, and his mouse, who reluctantly tolerates the house until he abandons Colin.

Colin spends his fortune on trying to find a cure for Chloe, which causes him to fire his cook and sell his pianocktail. He slips into poverty as Chloe's health declines. His friend Chick spends both his and Colin's money on anything that has to do with Partre, and Chick loses his job due to a Partre-related incident and is later killed when resisting law-enforcement officers. Alise tracks down Partre himself and kills him. Chloe passes away. Colin, Nicolas, and his fiancé, Isis, hold a funeral for her. Unable to bear the grief, Colin jumps into a river, sinking into the darkness.

== Cast ==
- Romain Duris as Colin
- Audrey Tautou as Chloé
- Gad Elmaleh as Chick
- Aïssa Maïga as Alise
- Omar Sy as Nicolas
- Charlotte Le Bon as Isis
- Sacha Bourdo as mouse
- Philippe Torreton as Jean-Sol Partre (voiced by David Bolling)
- Alain Chabat as Gouffé
- Zinedine Soualem as plant manager
- Natacha Régnier as remedy saleswoman
- Vincent Rottiers as priest
- Laurent Lafitte as CEO
- August Darnell as Duke Ellington
- Michel Gondry as Dr. Mangemanche (uncredited)

== Production ==
The screenplay was written by Luc Bossi and Michel Gondry and based on the 1947 novel Froth on the Daydream by Boris Vian. The novel had previously been adapted into a 1968 French film with the English title Spray of the Days, and a 2001 Japanese film with the title Chloe. Mood Indigo was produced by Brio Films, with co-production support from France 2 Cinéma, StudioCanal, and the Belgian company Scope Pictures. It was pre-acquired by Canal+ and Ciné+, and received 650,000 euro from Eurimages. The total budget was 19 million euro. Filming started 10 April 2012 and ended on 23 July. Locations were used in Belgium and around Paris.

The film had a troubled production, from which Gondry drew inspiration for his 2023 film The Book of Solutions.

== Release ==
The film premiered in France and Belgium on 24 April 2013. Drafthouse Films released the film in the United States in a version with the full runtime of 131 minutes.

== Reception ==
The film had 861,627 admissions in France. At AlloCiné's review aggregator, it has an average score of 3.0 out of 5 based on 34 French-language reviews. On Rotten Tomatoes, it holds a 61% approval rating based on 111 reviews, with an average rating of 6/10. The critical consensus reads, "Mood Indigo is far from Michel Gondry's most compelling work, but it doesn't skimp on the visual whimsy and heartfelt emotion fans have come to expect". It also holds a 54/100 rating on Metacritic, based on 26 critics, indicating "mixed or average reviews".
