= L'écume des jours (opera) =

- Opera by Edison Denisov
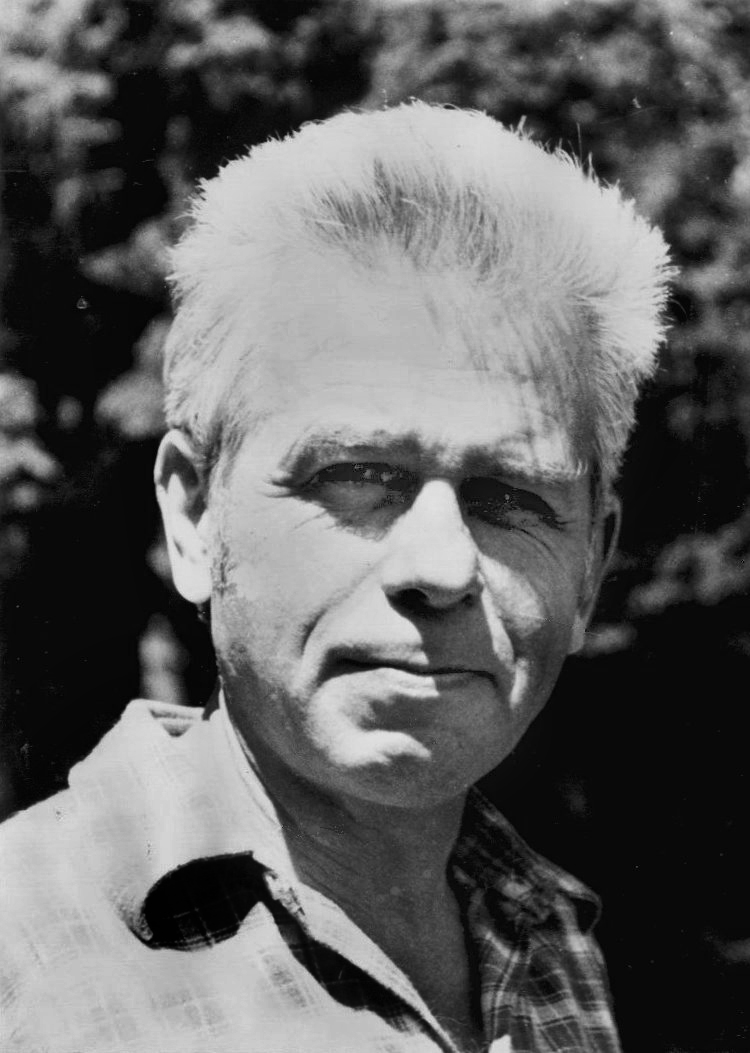
- Edison Denisov in 1975
- Description: lyrical drama
- Translation: The Foam of Days
- Librettist: Denisov
- Language: French
- Based on: Froth on the Daydream by Boris Vian
- Premiere: 15 March 1986; Opéra-Comique, Paris

L'écume des jours (English: The Foam of Days) is an opera in three acts (14 scenes) composed by the Russian composer Edison Denisov in 1981. The French (also German and Russian) text is by the composer based on the novel of the same title by Boris Vian.

== Composition history ==
Denisov conceived of the opera in the 1970s, and he worked on it up until 1981. The libretto is written in French. In it, Denisov used text from the novel and from numerous songs by Boris Vian. He also used religious texts, including a song by an anonymous author (14th tableau), a text from a funeral liturgy (13th tableau), and the Latin text from the mass (Credo and Gloria – 2nd tableau) and from the requiem (Agnus dei and Requiem aeternam – 13th tableau).

Denisov defined his opera as a lyrical drama. The musical language is typical of Denisov's music of the 1980s with complex chromatic vocal lines, dissonant harmony and rich orchestral textures. There are many quotations, hidden quotations or allusions to music of different styles and epochs: songs by Duke Ellington, American jazz, French chanson, or Gregorian chant. All of these are veiled and transformed in some way, and even the quotation from Wagner’s Tristan und Isolde has a jazzy hue.

The duration of the work is 2 hours and 20 minutes. It was published by Le Chant du Monde in Paris.

== Performance history ==
The premiere performance was given on 15 March 1986 at the Opéra-Comique in Paris, conducted by John Burdekin and directed by Jean-Claude Fall. Subsequently, productions were mounted at the Perm Opera Theatre in 1989 and the Staatsoper Stuttgart in late 2012. The second French production was mounted in Lille in November 2025, conducted by Bassem Akiki and directed by Anna Smolar.

== Roles ==
Roles	Voice type	Premiere cast 15 March 1986 (Conductor: John Burdekin)
Colin	tenor	Thierry Dran
Chloé	light soprano	Véronique Dietschy
Chick	tenor	Marcel Quillevéré
Alise	mezzo-soprano	Eva Saurova
Isis	soprano	Éliane Lublin
Nicolas	bass	Fernand Dumont
Mangemanche	bass	Jean-Louis Soumagnas
Le sénéchal	tenor	Bruce Brewer
Director of the plant	baritone	Michel Philippe
Jésus	baritone	Jean-Noël Beguelin
The Mouse	speaker	Sarah Mesguich
The pharmacist	speaker	Jean Rumeau
Little Girl	child's voice	Catherine Martin

== Scoring ==
- Singers: 2 sopranos, mezzo, 4 tenors, 2 baritones, 3 basses, 2 mimes, 1 boy soprano, chorus
- Orchestra: 3.3.3.3 – alt saxophone, tenor saxophone – 3.3.3.1– percussion – electric guitar, bass guitar – piano/celesta – harp – strings

== Synopsis ==
=== Act 1 ===
1st Tableau: Colin's room

Colin lives together with Mouse, the friend of his house. Colin is waiting for his friend, engineer Chick, whom he invited for dinner. His cook Nicolas is reading the recipes from the cook book. Chick arrives, and Colin shows him the "piano-cocktail", his own invention – the piano that makes cocktails. Chick plays an improvisation on Duke Ellington themes and then tells him about Alise, the niece of Nicolas, whom he met at the conference of Jean-Sol Partre (a broad hint on Jean-Paul Sartre). They both go skating.

Intermezzo: Colin dreams about a girl he wants to meet

2nd Tableau: The skating-rink "Molitor"

Chick and Colin meet Alise and Isis, who invites them to the birthday celebration of her dog. One of the skaters breaks up on the wall. They all join the burial liturgy.

Intermezzo: The windy street

Colin repeats: "I would like to fall in love, you would like to fall in love", and so on.

3rd Tableau: At Isis

Alise tells Colin that Chick does not want to marry her, because he spends all his money on the books by Jean-Sol Partre. Chloé enters. Colin feels that she is the girl of his dream. They dance.

4th Tableau: The Quarter

Colin meets Chloé and they walk along the streets. Terrified by the absurd shop-windows they went to the forest where surrounded by the pink cloud they are invisible for other people.

=== Act 2 ===
5th Tableau: Wedding preparations

Two "honorary homosexuals", Pégase and Coriolan, are preparing themselves for the wedding. Simultaneously Chloé, Alise and Isis also prepare themselves for the wedding.

Intermezzo: The wedding of Colin and Chloé: Hymn of Love

6th Tableau: The honeymoon trip

Colin and Chloé travel by car with Nicolas as a driver. Chloé is frightened by the vision of strange fish-scale beasts, smoke and dirt of the copper mines.

7th Tableau: At Colin's

Colin and Chloé are in bed. Chloé complains about pain in her lungs. They play a record, and the room is transformed into a sphere. The visit of a doctor.

Intermezzo: The Medical Quarter, the channel with some fragments of bloody cotton, the eye gazing to Colin and Chloé

8th Tableau: The pharmacy

Colin and Chick are in a strange pharmacy with a guillotine for recipes and a mechanical rabbit making pills. Colin tells that Chloé has a lily in her lungs, and only flowers can cure her.

9th Tableau: At Colin's

Chloé is surrounded by flowers. The room became smaller. Colin reads her a novel about Tristan and Iseult.

=== Act 3 ===
Intermezzo: Colin walks along the road; the vision of strange shapes and shadows

10th Tableau: The military plant

Colin finds a job at the military factory. The Director explains that weapons are growing from the seeds if you warm them with your naked body.

11th Tableau: At Colin's

Chloé sleeps among the flowers. Alise enters and tells Colin that Chick spent all his money on the books by Jean-Sol Partre, and now wants to separate from her. Colin tries to console her.

Intermezzo: Seneschal and eight policemen are coming to Chick to confiscate his property

12th Tableau: At Chick's

Chick dies defending his books. Paris is on fire.

Intermezzo: Alise sets fire to the bookshops with the books by Jean-Sol Partre

13th Tableau: Chloé’s death

The dialogue between Colin and Jesus nailed to the cross.

Intermezzo: The empty town. The little girl sings a song about the dead town

14th Tableau: An Epilogue

Dialogue of Cat and Mouse. Mouse wants to die putting its head into the Cat's mouth. Blind girls walk the street singing a song about Jesus. One of the girls stepped on the Cat's tail. The Cat shuts its mouth.

== Recordings ==
Colin et Chloé, suite from the opera L'écume des jours (The Foam of Days) for soprano, mezzo-soprano, tenor, chorus and orchestra (1981) 36' Text by Boris Vian (French); LP Melodiya 24593 and CD Melodiya SUCD 10-00107: Latvian SSR Academic Chorus, The USSR Ministry of Culture Symphony Orchestra, Vassily Sinaisky (conductor), Nelli Lee (soprano), Nina Terentieva (mezzo-soprano), Nikolai Dumtsev (tenor)

- 1. The Street - 22.36 (1-7)
- 2. The Molitor Skating Rink
- 3. On the Way to Chloé

- 4. The Wedding
- 5. Colin et Chloé
- 6. The Medical Quarter

- 7. Alice's Death
- 8. Epilogue - 7.40
