= Russell Peck =

American composer

Russell Peck was an American composer born in Detroit on January 25, 1945 to Thorland (Tom) and Margaret (Carlson) Peck. He died in Greensboro, North Carolina on March 1, 2009, at the age of 64.

== Life and career ==
Peck's early music education was grounded in Mozart and Beethoven, but also heavily influenced by the soul music emerging from Detroit during his formative years. Peck was the youngest of three children, and doted on by his two older sisters, Jean and Joyce. His father, Tom, sang in the Detroit Symphony Chorus in the late 1930s–early 1940s for their Ford Symphony Hour national radio broadcasts, and later in his life was active with barbershop quartets. Tom was a proponent of Russell's interest in classical music, and encouraged him in his studies. From early on, Peck wanted to compose and began learning piano in fifth grade. Later, in high school, he played trombone in band and orchestra. The Motown sound inspired Peck to compose with melodic flow, engaging rhythm, and rich harmonies. The marriage of these two musical worlds is the backdrop of Peck's compositions, and is his trademark.

Peck is a well-known American composer of music for the symphony. His compositions have been included in thousands of performances by hundreds of orchestras in the United States, Canada, Europe, Asia, Latin America and Africa, including more than a dozen major orchestras such as the London Symphony, Montreal Symphony, and the Boston Symphony Orchestra, as well as regional orchestras throughout the U.S. His most popular works include the percussion concerto, The Glory and the Grandeur, Signs of Life II for string orchestra, and The Thrill of the Orchestra, a narrated demonstration piece for orchestra. In 2000-2001 a consortium of 39 American orchestras commissioned Peck's Timpani Concerto, Harmonic Rhythm. The premiere performances began with the Louisville Orchestra and proceeded with orchestras throughout the country.

== Education ==
Russell Peck was a cum laude graduate of the University of Michigan (1966), where he also received Master and Doctoral degrees in composition (1967 and 1972). His teachers included Clark Eastham, Leslie Bassett, Ross Lee Finney, Gunther Schuller, and George Rochberg.

Russell Peck received the coveted Koussevitsky Prize in 1966 awarded through his association with the Tanglewood Music Center, two Ford Foundation Fellowships, grants from the National Endowment for the Arts, several states' arts councils, and ASCAP awards. Peck's artist residencies include the Gaudeamus Contemporary Music Festival in the Netherlands and a two-year appointment as composer-in-residence for the city of Indianapolis and the Indianapolis Symphony. Peck served on the faculty of Northern Illinois University, Eastman School of Music, and the North Carolina School of the Arts.

Beginning in the fall of 1974 through 1976 Peck was an assistant Professor of Music Theory at Northern Illinois University. In January 1977 he accepted an interim position teaching music composition at the Eastman School of Music. In the fall of 1977, he began teaching various aspects of the study of music, including music history and music theory, at the North Carolina School of the Arts. In 1979 Peck chose not to continue teaching in order to pursue his increasing interest in the cause of ending world starvation. Peck's altruistic concerns dominated his time for several years until he re-emerged with the popular orchestra piece, Signs of Life, in 1983.

== Symphonic works ==
=== Concertos ===
- The Upward Stream, concerto for tenor saxophone and orchestra. The Upward Stream was commissioned for a world premiere performance in 1985 by James Houlik with the Winston-Salem Symphony, Peter Perret, Music Director, with funding assistance provided by the North Carolina Arts Council. The Upward Stream's use of tenor sax was a unique addition to the concerto form. Peck chose tenor sax for its ability to project like a brass instrument against full orchestra, while retaining the technical virtuosity of a woodwind. Additionally, the range of the tenor saxophone corresponds almost exactly to the human voice (from low baritone to highest soprano), and so has a full expressive range. James Houlik recorded the work with the London Symphony. Duration: 20', (1985).
- The Glory and the Grandeur, concerto for three percussionists and orchestra. Incorporating an opening paraphrase of the composer's percussion piece Lift-Off, The Glory and the Grandeur is a visually engaging piece. The percussionists perform in front of the orchestra on an array of varied instruments. At the opening they play rhythmic antiphony from widely separated drum stations, then gather at the metal instruments of vibraphone, bells, and Chinese cymbals and gongs. At one point in the composition, all three perform together on one marimba. The finale section builds in a rapid pace of color changes as the players hasten among different instruments, and concludes with the orchestra supporting a return to the antiphonal drum idea of the opening. Duration: 12', (1988).
- Voice of the Wood, concerto for cello quartet and orchestra. One of the only existing works written for the medium of cello quartet and orchestra. A Charlotte Observer review noted, "...classic Peck, tonal and accessible, and driven by syncopation...especially winning was the rich collective voice of the four soloists...the audience responded with an extended ovation." Charlotte Observer, March 6, 1999, Dean Smith. Voice of the Wood was premiered in 1999 by the Charlotte Symphony. Movements include I. Prelude II. Fantasia. Duration: 21' (1999).
- Harmonic Rhythm, concerto for timpani and orchestra. At that time, the writing of this concerto, which premiered in 2000, was inspired by the largest commissioning consortium to date in music history—39 orchestras. It was also sparked by interest among timpanists based on the composer's well-known percussion concerto The Glory and the Grandeur and percussion trio Lift-Off. It is visually stimulating due to the unusual variety of mallets and brilliant sticking. Harmonic Rhythm requires 5 drums (4 standard sizes plus a piccolo drum). A primary feature is the melodic writing for the timpani, which shows the instrument's expressive range extending into areas of surprising lyricism. Duration: 22', (2000).

=== Orchestral ===
- Signs of Life II, a composition in three movements for string orchestra, Signs of Life is in two movements: an Arioso (6') and a jazz-inspired Scherzo (6') using many string techniques including the composer's own picking technique. Signs of Life II adds an Allegro first movement (3'30") to create a three-movement work. Total duration: 15'30" (1983/1986). Signs of Life and Signs of Life II was dedicated to Peck's wife, Cameron, and was written for Paul Polivnick and the Milwaukee Symphony. The work was premiered at the Performing Arts Center in Milwaukee, June 16, 1984.
- Gabriel, concert overture for orchestra, was originally the first movement of a trumpet concerto (The Phoenix) commissioned in 1988 by Doc Severinsen and the Phoenix and North Carolina Symphonies. The first movement of The Phoenix was reworked as Gabriel as performed by the Nashville Symphony. Duration: 6', (1997).
- Peace Overture, for orchestra. A programmatic tone poem about the struggle for peace - inspired by the life of Anwar Sadat and the Israel-Egypt Peace Accords. Conductor, Paul Polivnick recorded Peace Overture with the London Symphony. Polivnick also premiered the work in 1988 during the Birmingham International Festival of Arts, which commissioned Peck to write a piece for the Alabama Symphony honoring Egypt. It traces an emotional outline regarding Sadat's story. One very defined melody permeates the work: the Spiritual "Sometimes I feel like a motherless child". Peck said he didn't intend to quote a phrase from this melody, but there is a clear correlation when listening to the song, for example, as sung by Paul Robeson. Peace Overture was performed at the Eastern Music Festival in July 2009 in honor of Russell Peck. Duration: 11', (1988).
- Freedom Fanfare, for orchestra. Shows each part of the orchestra using chimes and brass band. Duration: 3' (1995).
- Revolutionary Action, for orchestra (with drumset). This is a short, rock-music piece based on the first section of Jack and Jill at Bunker Hill. Jack and Jill is a story piece for narrator and orchestra. Duration 4' (1995).
- Don't Tread on Me, for string orchestra. Don't Tread on Me is actually the first movement of Signs of Life. Although it begins in a Mozartian vein, Don't Tread On Me is rock-influenced and makes use of feroce string crossings. Duration: 3' 30", (1995)
- Mozart Escapes, concerto for orchestra (based on movements of keyboard sonatas by W.A. Mozart). I. Allegro maestoso (Revolutionary Brass) 4'30", II. Andante cantabile (Amadeus Meets Stradivarius 7'00", III. Allegretto scherzando (Woodwinds a la Wolfgang) 5'00", IV. Allegro vivace (Mallets and Mozart) 6'00". Total duration: 22' 30", (1997).
- Ultra-Americana, two pieces for orchestra. Out of the Blue, 8'45". Nostalgic in style with many elements of traditional blues and Americana, Out of the Blue is a moderately-paced intermesso. Flying on Instruments, 4'45". Allegro vivace throughout, Flying on Instruments draws upon jazzy, Latin, and gospel-music flavors with massed strings and other sections featured as group soloists. Total duration: 13'30", (1997).

=== Educational and family pieces ===
- Where's Red Robin? (formerly Who Killed Cock Robin?) nature story piece for narrator and orchestra, dedicated to Peck's daughter, Eva. Peck interpreted the classic English nursery rhyme as a tale of springtime and rebirth using the robin as muse. Where's Red Robin? makes use of mood changes in the narrative. As the story unfolds, musical emotions are employed including elation, sadness, humor, mystery, dramatic danger and finally the reassurance of another joy-filled spring. The work was a commission of the New Orleans Philharmonic, with Conductor Carter Nice. Duration: 17', with options for reduced duration (1995/1973).
- Jack and Jill at Bunker Hill, revolutionary story piece for narrator and orchestra. Written in 1976 for Carter Nice and the New Orleans Philharmonic as a celebration of America's Bicentennial, Jack and Jill is an entertaining look at the American Revolution. Peck again made use of a classic English nursery rhyme to explore the dynamics of this American narrative: I. Battle of Bunker Hill, II. Declaration of Independence, and III. Liberty Bell Celebration. Jack and Jill combines a story of American history and idealism with music. Jack and Jill highlights historical fact, while incorporating sounds which are American in feel (such as Motown), thus paying homage to American musical culture in general. Duration: 9', (1997/1976).
- The Thrill of the Orchestra, demonstration piece for narrator and orchestra. The Thrill of the Orchestra illustrates the instruments and how they are played. Frequently performed and repeated by many major American and foreign orchestras (Pittsburgh, Atlanta, Montreal, Royal Philharmonic, etc.) and more than 100 regional and other orchestras across the United States, The Thrill was commissioned by and is dedicated to Alfred Savia and the Florida Symphony Orchestra, which premiered the work in October 1985 on a series of young people's concerts. During his lifetime, Peck was known to narrate this piece himself. Duration: 13' (1985).
- Playing with Style, demonstration piece for orchestra with narration. This "concerto for conductor" uses music and narration to illustrate the conductor's role and the basics of crescendo, diminuendo, accelerando, ritardando, legato and staccato. The piece concludes with a fast-paced musical finale designed to showcase the ability of the orchestra to change in mood and style. This work is also designed to permit narration by the conductor. It was commissioned in 1991 for a consortium of North Carolina Orchestras by the North Carolina Arts Council. Duration: 10' (1991) . Commissioned by the Charlotte Symphony for premier performances by 4 North Carolina Orchestras: The Charlotte Symphony, The Greensboro Symphony, The North Carolina Symphony, and Winston-Salem Symphony. Funding assistance provided by the North Carolina Arts Council and The National Endowment for the Arts.

=== Chamber music ===
- Two Songs on Poems of William Carlos Williams, for soprano, 4 celli, 4 flute, 1963
- Seven-Fold Amen, for cello, percussion and celesta, 1964
- Six Pak, for violin, cello, double bass, flute, clarinet and horn, 1965
- Automobile, for soprano, flute, double bass and percussion, 1966
- Lion's Breath, for double bass and percussion, 1966
- Unsafe at Any Speed, for string quartet and percussion quartet, 1966
- 1 DB, for double bass "solo trio": double bass with tape, 1968
- Lift-Off, for percussion trio, 1968
- The Cat's Meow, for piano four hands or duo, 1969
- Quotations from the Electric Chairman, for mixed chorus and tape or double bass, 1969
- Time Being, for violin "solo trio", violin with tape and optional mime/dance, 1969
- Manner of the World Nowadays, male chorus and brass ensemble, 1970
- Upon a Dead Man's Head, tenor and small ensemble with slides, 1970
- Suspended Sentence, for piano, 1972
- Drastic Measures, for saxophone quartet, 1976
- In the Garden, for organ and drum set (optional), 1976
- Romance, for piano, dedicated to Margaret and Thorland Peck, 1980
- The Upward Stream, concerto for tenor saxophone and orchestra, solo part with piano arrangement, 1985
- Don't Tread on Me or on My String Quartet, for string quartet, 1986
- Five-Ring Circus, for woodwind quintet, 1986
- A "Minor Monster-Piece", for brass quintet, 1986
- The Glory and the Grandeur, concerto for percussion trio, solo parts with piano arrangement, 1988
- Big Shot Brass, for brass quintet, 1991
- Glimmer of Hope, fantasia-chaconne for violin and piano, 2002

=== Band/wind ensemble ===
- Gothic Music, for band, 1965
- American Epic, for band, 1972
- The New Cats Meow, for jazz band, 1972
- Winter Music, for young string orchestra, 1975
- Cave, for wind ensemble/band, 1976
- Funky Boogie, for young band, 1976
- Star Machine, for young band, 1977
- The Glory and the Grandeur, concerto for percussion trio and wind symphony, arr. 2006
- The Upward Stream, concerto for tenor saxophone and symphonic band, arr. by Scott Jones 2013
