= Vercoquin and the Plankton =

1946 novel by Boris Vian

Vercoquin et le plancton
- First edition
- Author: Boris Vian
- Original title: Vercoquin et le plancton
- Language: French
- Publisher: Éditions Gallimard
- Publication date: 1946
- Publication place: France
- Pages: 197

Vercoquin and the Plankton (French: Vercoquin et le plancton) is a 1946 novel by the French writer Boris Vian, published by Éditions Gallimard. The first English-language translation of the novel was published in 2022.

Vercoquin et le plancton was the sequel to Trouble dans les andains (Trouble in the Swaths), but the latter was not published until 1966, seven years after Vian's death.

Both of these novels feature the characters of the Major and Antioch. The eponymous Vercoquin will be the Major's rival in love, as they do whatever it takes to get their hands on Zizanie.

== See also ==
- 1946 in literature
- 20th-century French literature
