= I Spit on Your Graves =

1946 novel by Vernon Sullivan

I Shall Spit on Your Graves
- First edition
- Author: Vernon Sullivan (Boris Vian)
- Original title: J'irai cracher sur vos tombes
- Translator: Boris Vian; Milton Rosenthal
- Language: French
- Publisher: Éditions du Scorpion
- Publication date: 1946
- Publication place: France
- English publication date: 1948
- Pages: 190

I Shall Spit on Your Graves (French: J'irai cracher sur vos tombes) is a 1946 roman noir by French writer Boris Vian, initially published by Éditions du Scorpion under the pseudonym Vernon Sullivan. The story is set in the United States and it follows Lee Anderson, a black man whose white complexion allows him to cross racial barriers, and who swears revenge against the citizens of a small Southern town, in repayment for the death of his brother, who was lynched by an all white mob.

Having experienced rejection with his earlier publication attempts, Vian marketed I Spit on Your Graves as a "translation" of an original work by a certain Vernon Sullivan, allegedly an African-American writer of hardboiled fiction —a genre very popular at the time. Following the example Franz Kafka had set with his unfinished novel Amerika (1927), Vian, who had never set foot in the United States, but was a great fan of its popular culture and especially its jazz music, created an imaginary Southern American small town setting for his novel, based on descriptions he found in contemporary novels by authors such as Nelson Algren, Richard Wright and Raymond Chandler.

Due to the novel's shocking subject matter (with many disturbing scenes of rape and murder), Vian claimed that its author was forced out of his native country, and he was now living as an expatriate in France, to escape censorship and racial violence. This elaborate literary hoax that Vian had concocted was only exposed long after I Spit on Your Graves had gained notoriety and financial success, becoming the most talked about book of 1947.

== Summary ==
After the lynching of his brother, Lee Anderson is hiding out in Buckton, a small town somewhere in the South, careful not to reveal his true race and identity to any of his new acquaintances. Working in a second-hand bookstore, he immediately starts hanging out with the local teen crowd and he indulges in sex with underage girls "whose breasts are firm to the touch, like ripe plums", secretly aiming to defile and humiliate them. Anderson's eyes soon turn to the beautiful daughters of a local plantation owner. First, he sleeps with both sisters, and then he starts turning them against each other, before the situation spirals into an orgy of violence. Even though at first Anderson is almost sympathetic to the reader, as the story progresses he becomes all the more repulsive and the fact that he is mentally disturbed becomes more evident. In the final image of the novel, Anderson's erect penis is sticking out of his pants, as he hangs from the lynch mob's rope.

== Reception ==
Chris Petit reviewed the book for The Guardian in 2001, and called it "dreamily convincing", elaborating: "A main inspiration would have been the slew of Hollywood movies that opened in Paris after the liberation, identified by the French as films noirs. I Spit... is straight noir, but also a work of liberated imagination after four years of Nazi occupation: heady, abandoned, fevered and lubricious. A fusion of prime US pulp and French sado-eroticism".

The book, originally written in French, has been translated into various languages including English, Spanish, Catalan, Turkish, Italian, Greek and Arabic.

== Controversy ==
In France, the book became notorious after the Cartel d'action sociale et morale —the censor also responsible for banning Henry Miller's work in the country— turned the spotlight on it. Instead of hindering Vian, this made him crank out three more "Vernon Sullivan" novels during that same year, including the similarly themed The Dead All Have the Same Skin, whose protagonist, Daniel Parker, is named after the head of the Cartel d'action sociale et morale.

I Spit on Your Graves reached the peak of its infamy when it served as an instruction manual for a real-life murderer, whose copy of the book was found on the bedside table next to the murdered body of a prostitute with the following passage circled and underlined: "I again felt that strange sensation that ran up my back as my hand closed on her throat and I couldn't stop myself; it came; it was so strong that I let her go ...". Following this copycat crime, when the book went into reprints, it sold more than 500,000 copies, and Vian was tried for translating "objectionable material" (as Vernon Sullivan was still nowhere to be found). Vian ended up paying a fine of 100,000 francs, and in the summer of 1950 the French government banned any further sales of the book.

The book's popularity became somewhat of a curse for Vian. After the court case, his reputation declined, and it wasn't until after his death that his books started creeping back into print.

== Adaptations ==
The book was adapted into a film with the same title, directed by Michel Gast. Vian publicly denounced the film while it was still in production, but he attended the premiere on 23 June 1959. A few minutes into the screening, he stood and began to shout his dissatisfaction with the film when he collapsed and subsequently died of sudden cardiac arrest on the way to the hospital.

A comics adaptation of the novel was first published in France in 2020. Written by Jean-David Morvan and illustrated by a team of artists including Rey Macutay and Rafael Ortiz, the comic's English translation was serialized (as "I Spit on Your Grave") in the relaunched Penthouse Comics magazine in 2024, beginning with the magazine's first issue.

== See also ==
- 1946 in literature
- 20th-century French literature
- Hardboiled
