= The Red Grass (TV series) =

1959 British children's TV series

- Genre: Science fiction Children's
- Country of origin: United Kingdom
- Original language: English
- No. of series: 1
- No. of episodes: 6 (all missing)

Production
- Running time: 30 minutes
- Production company: Associated-Rediffusion

Original release
- Network: ITV

The Red Grass was a British black and white science fiction children's television series (6 Jan – 10 Feb 1959) made by Associated-Rediffusion for the ITV network, and transmitted on Tuesday afternoons at 5.25pm. The story concerned waving red grass that seeds itself all over the world and is fatal to the touch.

A group of ordinary young people with no special expertise or knowledge struggle to understand the Red Grass, where it came from, what its purpose is on Earth, and how to combat its spread and wipe it out before it kills the last human beings to survive.

"The Red Grass is an extraordinary herb discovered by an English archaeologist near Athens. Though it stings whoever touches it, it also gives them the ability to see into the future. Two crooks get hold of a specimen and rush off to England to use it for dishonest purposes. Unluckily for them, they are pursued by Donald and Janet Mason, two children aware of their secret"

The series was written by Peter Hayes and directed by John Rhodes. It starred Jacqueline Hussey and Nicholas Light as the two youngsters whose holiday among the Aegean Islands is fraught with danger and excitement, and Nicholas Amer played the sinister Dr Kaliakos. Other cast members included Robert Sansom, Dinsdale Landen, John Lang, Derek Sydney and Alec Bregonzi.

== Reception ==
Nigel Planer, who watched the serial as a child, described it as "terrifying!", although no contemporary tabloid reviews appear to have survived.

== Archive status ==
The series was transmitted live each week from Studio 4 at Associated-Rediffusion's Wembley Studios. No recordings of any of the six episodes are known to exist, presumably having been wiped or misplaced if, indeed, episodes were recorded at the time of transmission. The serial is effectively lost.
