= Gerhardt Zimmermann =

American conductor and educator (1947–2023)

Gerhardt Zimmermann (June 22, 1945 – June 10, 2023) was an American conductor and educator.

== Education ==
Gerhardt Zimmermann was born in Van Wert, Ohio, in 1945. He pursued his early music education at Bowling Green State University in Ohio, where he studied both conducting and composition, earning a Bachelor of Music degree. He furthered his studies with a Master of Music in Conducting from the University of Iowa.

== Career ==
Zimmermann's professional career began in the 1970s when he was appointed music director of the Canton Symphony Orchestra in Canton, Ohio, a position he held for several decades until his death in 2023, and where the orchestra's concert hall was named in his honor. He had planned to retire from the Canton Symphony in 2026. Under his leadership, the orchestra developed into one of the region's most respected orchestras, expanding its repertoire and outreach programs.

In addition to his work with the Canton Symphony, Zimmermann served as music director of the North Carolina Symphony from 1982 to 2003. During his tenure there, he oversaw a significant expansion of the orchestra's performance schedule and repertoire. He also served as assistant conductor of the St. Louis Symphony under Leonard Slatkin.

Zimmermann was also a regular guest conductor for many prominent American orchestras, including the Chicago Symphony Orchestra, the Cleveland Orchestra, and the Philadelphia Orchestra. His work as an educator has been equally notable, serving as the director of orchestral studies at the University of Texas at Austin for several years, where he mentored a new generation of conductors.

== Recordings ==
- Celebration: Gerhardt Zimmermann and the North Carolina Symphony Orchestra, Tchaikovsky/Strauss, 2003.
- Orchestral Music of Robert Ward, North Carolina Symphony, Albany Records, 2008.
