= The Red Grass =

1950 novel by Boris Vian

- First edition
- Author: Boris Vian
- Original title: L'Herbe rouge
- Language: French
- Publisher: Éditions Toutain
- Publication date: 1950
- Publication place: France
- Pages: 192

The Red Grass (French: L'Herbe rouge) is a 1950 novel by French writer Boris Vian, published by Éditions Toutain.

== See also ==
- 1950 in literature
- 20th-century French literature
