= Froth on the Daydream =

1947 surrealist novel by Boris Vian

- First English edition cover, 1967
- Author: Boris Vian
- Original title: L'Écume des jours
- Translator: Stanley Chapman
- Language: French
- Genre: Science fiction Fantasy; Comedy; Romance; Tragedy
- Publisher: Éditions Gallimard
- Publication date: 1947
- Publication place: France
- English publication date: November 1967 (Rapp & Carroll)
- Media type: Print
- Pages: 214

Froth on the Daydream (French: L'Écume des jours, lit. "The Froth of Days") is a 1947 surrealist novel by French author Boris Vian. It was first translated into English under that title in 1967. It has since been translated in additional versions under other English titles.

Although told as a linear narrative, the novel employs surrealism and contains multiple plot lines, including the love stories of two couples, talking mice, and a man who ages years in a week. One of the main plot lines concerns a newlywed man whose wife develops a rare and bizarre illness that can be treated only by surrounding her with flowers.

The book has been translated several times into English, each version with a different title. Stanley Chapman's translation is titled Froth on the Daydream (Rapp & Carroll, 1967), John Sturrock's is called Mood Indigo (Grove Press, 1968), and Brian Harper's is named Foam of the Daze (TamTam Books, 2012).

Mood Indigo was adapted as a 2013 film by the same title.

Farrar, Straus and Giroux published a second English version adapted from the film, and released as Mood Indigo (2014).

Froth on the Daydream has been adapted as three feature films, two music albums, and an opera.

== Plot ==
In a surreal world where animals and inanimate objects reflect the emotions of humans, Colin is a wealthy young man with a resourceful and stylish valet, Nicholas, and a loyal best friend, Chick. Despite his significant fortune and luxurious lifestyle, Colin is desperate for a lover, even going so far as secretly pining for Chick's girlfriend, Alyssum. Consequently, this overpowering desire compels Colin to instantly fall in love with Chloe, whom he meets at a friend's party. After a whirlwind romance, Colin weds Chloe in a grand ceremony. Generously, Colin bequeaths a quarter of his fortune to Chick and Alyssum so they too may marry despite the former's reluctance to do so.

During the honeymoon, Chloe falls ill with a mysterious disease that primarily consists of coughing and chest pain, and she and Colin are forced to end their trip early. Upon returning home, Chloe begins to feel better. However, her recovery is short-lived, and she faints during a shopping trip and her coughing fits return. She is eventually diagnosed with a water lily in the lung, a painful and rare condition that can be treated only by surrounding her with flowers. The expense of the treatment is large and Colin soon exhausts his funds, compelling him to undertake low-paying jobs in an effort to accumulate more money for Chloe's remedy. As Chloe's disease progresses, the apartments of Colin, Chick, and Nicholas all begin to decay, and Nicholas suddenly ages years in a single week.

Meanwhile, Chick's obsession with a philosopher Jean-Paul Heartre causes him to spend all his money, effort and attention on collecting Heartre's literature. Alyssum, who is resentful of Chick's neglect of her in favor of his burgeoning collection, attempts to save him financially and renew his interest in her by persuading Heartre to stop publishing books, whom she kills when he refuses. She then seeks revenge upon the booksellers carrying Heartre's works by murdering them and burning down their stores. Concurrently, Chick receives a surprise visit from the police for tax evasion and contraband tobacco smuggling. His refusal to turn over his Heartre books as payment for his crimes leads to his death from a gunshot fired by one of the policemen at the scene.

Ultimately, Colin struggles to provide flowers for Chloe to no avail, and his grief at her death is so strong that his pet mouse commits suicide to escape the gloom.

== Characters ==
- Colin is the amicable protagonist of Froth on the Daydream. At the age of 22, Colin has managed to amass a large amount of wealth, which enables him to elude employment and on which he spends on multiple luxuries. Initially, Colin experiences jealousy of his best friend Chick's romantic relationship and longs for his own. However, this desire is quickly fulfilled by Chloe, whom he meets at his friend Isis' party. His loving yet impulsive nature is portrayed by his swift marriage to Chloe, which occurs only a short time after their first meeting. By the end of the novel, he is left devastated and broke after Chloe's untimely death.
- Chloe is the girlfriend and later the wife of Colin, with whom she shares Isis as a mutual friend. She is instantly smitten by Colin and marries him soon after a whirlwind romance. During her honeymoon, she contracts a water lily in her lung, a rare disease that has only one cure: surrounding the patient with flowers. Despite her husband's best efforts to provide her treatment, her health quickly deteriorates and she dies, leaving Colin heartbroken. She is based on Boris Vian's first wife, Michelle.
- Chick is Colin's devoted and affable best friend. He is an engineer, a career that does not provide him with the same amount of wealth as Colin. Despite his lower socioeconomic status, Chick regularly dines and spends time with Colin. He is currently in a romantic relationship with Alyssum, whom he wants to marry but fears doing so due to his lack of money and the disapproval of her parents. Throughout the novel, he develops an unhealthy obsession with a philosopher, Jean-Pulse Heartre, which compels the former to spend all of his income on the works of the latter. He is ultimately killed after refusing to hand over his Heartre collection to the police as payment for his crimes of tax evasion and contraband smuggling.
- Nicholas is the dedicated, diligent, and practical 29-year old servant of Colin. He is renowned for his unique dishes and astounding sense of wisdom. He is also Alyssum's uncle. As Chloe's illness worsens, he suddenly ages years in a week.
- Alyssum (aka Alise in the original French edition) is Chick's 18-year old girlfriend, whom he met at one of Heartre's lectures. She is frustrated with Chick's reluctance to marry her and his Heartre addiction, the latter of which causes him to ignore her. Eventually, she descends into a murderous rage after an unsuccessful attempt to convince Heartre to stop publishing books.
- Isis is an 18-year old socialite and the friend of Colin, Chick, Alyssum, and Chloe who hosts the fateful party where Colin and Chloe first meet and fall in love. She is also Nicholas' girlfriend.
- Jean-Pulse Heartre is a philosopher and author with whose works Chick becomes obsessed with collecting. He is a fictionalized version of French philosopher Jean-Paul Sartre, with whom Michelle Vian had an extramarital affair.
- Professor Gnawknuckle is a doctor and scientist who diagnoses Chloe's disease.
- Father Phigga is the priest who officiates Colin and Chloe's wedding ceremony. After Chloe's death, he refuses to officiate her funeral due to Colin's lack of funds.
- The Kissitwell Brothers are made up of twins Coriolanus and Pegasus. They work as page-boys at numerous weddings, including Colin and Chloe's, and have adopted homosexuality to advance their careers. Despite their steady income, the brothers have ceased to take their work seriously.

== Themes and symbolism ==
It is widely believed that Chloe's illness is a metaphor for cancer and terminal illness. A possible parallel between Chloe's disease and the chronic heart condition Boris Vian suffered from throughout his life has also been speculated.

Colin's copious spending on Chloe's treatment and his relentless job search for more money represent the financial struggle many families face with paying for their loved ones' treatments and medical bills. His desperation to keep his wife alive and his grief and depression after her death symbolize the emotional and psychological anguish faced by individuals who know or have lost someone to terminal illness. Ultimately, Colin's actions and fate at the end of the novel demonstrate that cancer not only devastates the life of the patient – it also does the same to the lives of the people surrounding him or her.

Meanwhile, Chick's compulsive fixation on Jean-Pulse Heartre is a metaphor for drug addiction. His subsequent neglect of Alyssum and the rapid depletion of his funds on Heartre's works both reflect common characteristics shared among the majority of drug addicts.

The physical deterioration of the apartments of Colin, Nicholas, and Chick mirrors the depression and gradual loss of hope brought about by a persistent disease, and Nicholas' sudden ageing represents trauma and stress.

Jean-Pulse Heartre is a spoonerism of the French existentialist philosopher Jean-Paul Sartre's name. Throughout the novel, there are references to various works by Sartre, but like the philosopher's name, Boris Vian played with words to make new titles for "works" by Heartre. For example, sometimes Vian used a synonym, such as Le Vomi (Sartre's original, La Nausée), while other times he created titles that served as homonyms to those of original Sartre works, such as La Lettre et le Néon (The Letter and Neon), a pun on L'Être et le Néant (Being and Nothingness).

== Background and publication history ==
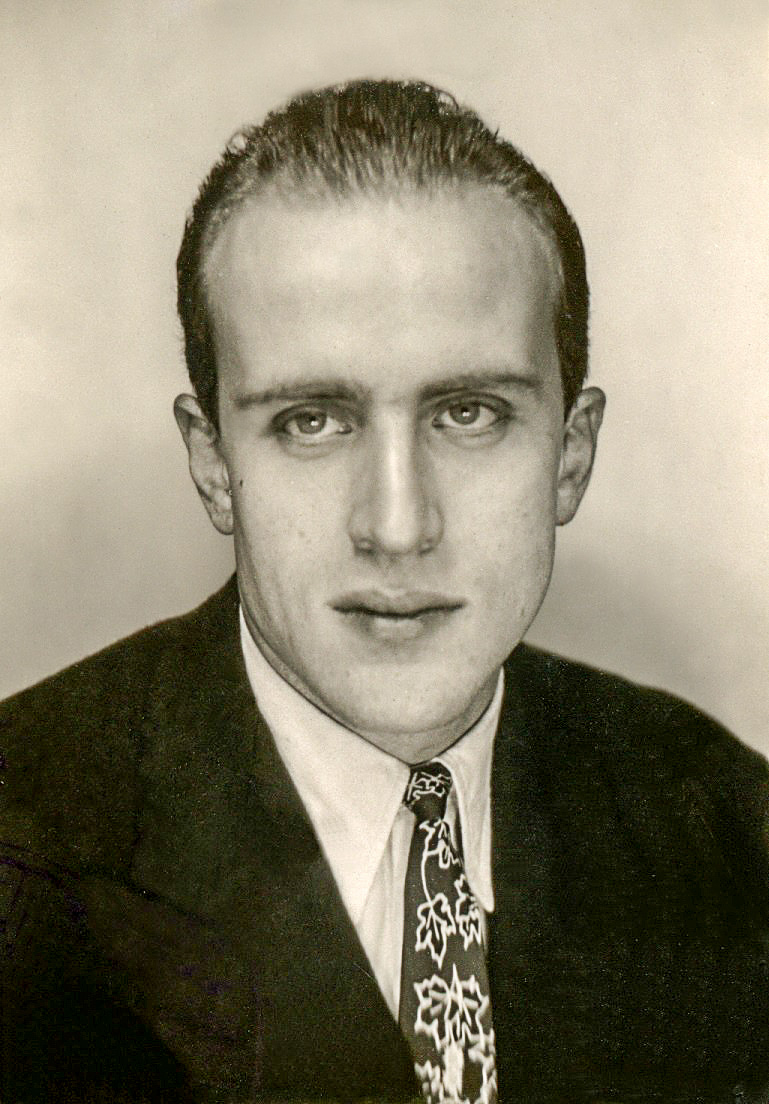
Boris Vian, author of Froth on the Daydream

Boris Vian finished writing the novel in the spring of 1946. The book sold poorly when it was published in 1947 as L'écume des jours under his birth name, Vian, rather than under his more famous pseudonym, Vernon Sullivan.

The work was first published in English as Froth on the Daydream in November 1967. Other published English translations title the work Foam of the Daze and Mood Indigo.

== Critical reception ==
Following its debut in France, Froth on the Daydream received little notice in the press and underperformed in sales. It garnered more attention after the publication of the first English translation in 1967. Over the years, the novel has received mostly positive reviews and is considered to be one of Vian's best works.

In his review for The Independent, David Evans described Froth on the Daydream as "a mad, moving, beautiful novel." In another positive review for the Los Angeles Times, James Sallis stated, "This [Froth on the Daydream] is a great novel...beneath are a host of ambiguities, digressions, levels of meaning. Not quite beneath, actually, for subtexts keep erupting to the surface. It is in many ways a novel built of eruptions." In her critique, Ruby Millar reported Froth on the Daydream as "a book in which every line has a bite" and also commended Chapman's translation. English writer and translator John Sturrock praised the novel for being "the most consistent and balanced of all of Boris Vian's novels", and John Whitley of Sunday Times commended it for being "as timeless as Le Grand Meaulnes or even La Princesse de Clèves."

Meanwhile, in a mixed review for Review of Contemporary Fiction, Thomas Hove observed that "sometimes Vian's absurdist style creates an emotionally distant effect", but later asserted that Froth on the Daydream's "final chapters sustain a powerful note of sadness for two young loves ruined by mortality, rival intellectual obsessions, and a repressive work ethic."

In another lukewarm evaluation written for The Harvard Crimson in 1969, Nina Bernstein, a Harvard University undergraduate student at the time who later became a journalist, described Froth on the Daydream as "a disappointment" and subsequently predicted, "It's unlikely that Vian's novels will become particularly popular in this country: they're very French, and they suffer in translation." She also observed that the "puns and word games (unfortunately badly translated) shade into black humor which at the novel's end becomes a Kafkaesque surrealism that we find frightening rather than funny" and dismissed Colin and Chloe's romance as "simple to the point of banality." However, at the end of her review, Bernstein acknowledged that Froth on the Daydream "has a magic no heavy-handed translator can counteract. It's effective on so many levels that reading it is more than a pleasant pastime – it's like an initiation into Vian's way of responding to reality. And a very powerful one, too."

== Accolades ==
Froth on the Daydream was #10 on the Le Monde's 100 Books of the Century list, which was compiled by the French retailer Fnac and the French daily newspaper Le Monde. To assemble the list, both companies polled 17,000 people on the question "Which books have remained in your memory?" in the spring of 1999.

== Adaptations ==
=== Film ===
- Spray of the Days, a 1968 French film directed by Charles Belmont and starring Jacques Perrin, Marie-France Pisier, Sami Frey, Alexandra Stewart, Annie Buron, and Bernard Fresson.
- Chloe, a 2001 Japanese film directed by Go Riju and starring Masatoshi Nagase with cinematography by Shinoda Noboru. It was selected for competition at the 2001 Berlin Film Festival.
- Mood Indigo, a second French adaptation directed by Michel Gondry and starring Audrey Tautou and Romain Duris. It was released on April 24, 2013.

=== Music ===
- L'Écume des jours, a 1979 album by French progressive rock band Mémoriance.
- L'écume des jours, a three-act opera composed by the Russian composer Edison Denisov in 1981. It premiered on March 15, 1986.
- Froth on a Daydream, a 2015 album by French jazz-cabaret band Dazie Mae.
