= Boris Vian =

French writer and musician (1920–1959)

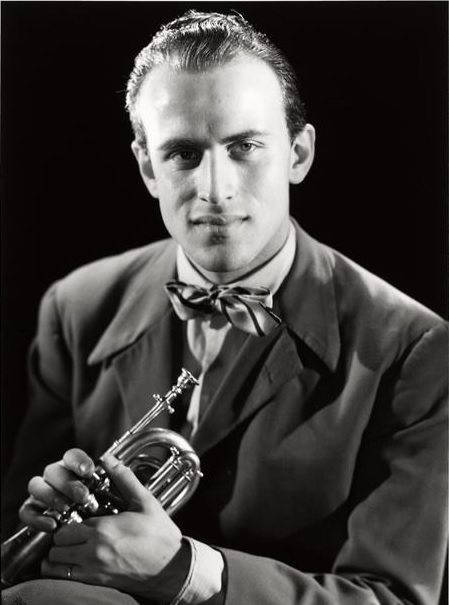
- Vian in 1948
- Born: 10 March 1920; Ville-d'Avray, Seine, France
- Died: 23 June 1959 (aged 39); Paris, France
- Education: École Centrale Paris
- Occupations: Novelist, poet, playwright, journalist, engineer, musician, songwriter, singer
- Spouses: Michelle Léglise (divorced); Ursula Kübler
- Writing career
- Pen name: Vernon Sullivan, Bison Ravi, Baron Visi, Brisavion
- Notable works: L'Écume des jours J'irai cracher sur vos tombes L'Automne à Pékin; L'Herbe rouge L'Arrache-cœur

Boris Vian (French: [bɔʁis vjɑ̃]; 10 March 1920 – 23 June 1959) was a French polymath who is primarily remembered for his novels. Those published under the pseudonym Vernon Sullivan were bizarre parodies of criminal fiction, highly controversial at the time of their release owing to their unconventional outlook.

Vian's other fiction, published under his real name, featured a highly individual writing style with numerous made-up words, subtle wordplay and surrealistic plots. His novel Froth on the Daydream (L'Écume des jours) is the best known of these works and one of the many translated into English.

Vian was an important influence on the French jazz scene. He served as liaison for Hoagy Carmichael, Duke Ellington and Miles Davis in Paris, wrote for several French jazz-reviews (Le Jazz Hot, Paris Jazz) and published numerous articles dealing with jazz both in the United States and in France. His own music and songs enjoyed popularity during his lifetime, particularly the anti-war song "Le Déserteur" (The Deserter).

== Biography ==
=== Early life ===
Boris Vian was born in 1920 into an upper-middle-class family in the wealthy Parisian suburb of Ville d'Avray. His parents were Paul Vian, a rentier, who lived on income from investments; and Yvonne Ravenez, amateur pianist and harpist. From his father, Vian grew up with a distrust of the church and the military, as well as a love of the bohemian life. Vian was the second of four children: the others were Lélio (1918–1984), Alain (1921–1995) and Ninon (1924–2003). The family occupied Les Fauvettes villa. Yvonne chose his name of Boris after seeing a performance of Mussorgsky's opera Boris Godunov.

Boris' later childhood was marked with illness as he suffered from rheumatic fever when he was 12. From then on, his parents became overprotective toward him. He later judged them harshly for this in his books L'Herbe rouge and L'Arrache-coeur.

=== Formal education and teenage years ===
From 1932 to 1937, Vian studied at Lycée Hoche in Versailles. In 1936, he and his two brothers began to organize what they called "surprise-parties" (surprise parties). They partook of mescaline in the form of the Mexican cactus called peyote. These gatherings became the basis of Vian's early novels: Trouble dans les andains (Turmoil in the Swaths) (1943) and particularly Vercoquin et le plancton (Vercoquin and the Plankton) (1943–44). It was also in 1936 that Vian became interested in jazz. The next year, he started playing the trumpet and joined the Hot Club de France.

In 1937, Vian graduated from Lycée Hoche, passing baccalauréats in mathematics, philosophy, Latin, Greek and German. He subsequently enrolled at Lycée Condorcet, Paris, where he studied special mathematics until 1939. Vian became fully immersed in the French jazz scene: for example, in 1939 he helped organize Duke Ellington's second concert in France. When World War II started, Vian was not accepted into the army due to poor health. He entered École Centrale des Arts et Manufactures in Paris and subsequently moved to Angoulême when the school moved there because of the war.

In 1940, Vian met Michelle Léglise, whom he married in 1941. She taught Vian English and introduced him to translations of American literature. Also in 1940, Vian met Jacques Loustalot, who became a recurring character in several early novels and short stories as "The Colonel". Loustalot died accidentally in 1949 falling from a building he was trying to climb after a bet, in order to enter into a flat by the window.

In 1942, Vian and his brothers joined a jazz orchestra under the direction of Claude Abadie. Vian later used him as a minor character in his book Vercoquin et le plancton. The same year, Vian graduated from École Centrale with a diploma in metallurgy, and his son Patrick was born.

=== Career ===
After Vian's graduation, he and Michelle moved to the 10th arrondissement of Paris. On 24 August 1942, he became an engineer at the French Association for Standardisation (AFNOR). By this time he was already an accomplished jazz trumpeter. In 1943 he wrote his first novel, Trouble dans les andains (Turmoil in the Swaths). His literary career started in 1943 with his first publication, a poem, in the Hot Club de France bulletin. The poem was signed Bison Ravi ("Delighted Bison"), an anagram of Vian's real name. The same year Vian's father died, murdered at home by burglars.

In 1944, Vian completed Vercoquin et le plancton (Vercoquin and the Plankton), a novel inspired partly by surprise-parties of his youth and partly by his job at the AFNOR (which is sharply satirized in the novel). Raymond Queneau and Jean Rostand helped Vian to publish this work at Éditions Gallimard in 1947, along with several works which Vian completed in 1946. These included his first major novels, L'Écume des jours and L'automne à Pékin (Autumn in Peking). The former, a tragic love story in which real world objects respond to the characters' emotions, is now regarded as Vian's masterpiece, but at the time of its publication it failed to attract any considerable attention. L'automne à Pékin, similarly had a love story at its heart but was somewhat more complex, and also failed to sell well.

Frustrated by the commercial failure of his works, Vian vowed he could write a best-seller; he wrote the hard-boiled novel I Spit on Your Graves (J'irai cracher sur vos tombes) in only 15 days. The book was ascribed to a fictitious American writer, Vernon Sullivan, with Vian credited as translator. Vian persuaded his publisher friend Jean d'Halluin to publish the novel in 1947. Eventually the hoax became known and the book became one of the best-selling titles of that year. Vian wrote three more Vernon Sullivan novels from 1947 to 1949.

The year 1946 marked a turning point in Vian's life: At one of the popular parties that he and Michelle hosted he made the acquaintance of Jean-Paul Sartre, Simone de Beauvoir and Albert Camus, and became a regular in their literary circle. He started regularly publishing various pieces in Les Temps modernes.

Vian admired Sartre in particular and gave him a prominent role—as "Jean-Sol Partre"—in L'Écume des jours (litt. "The foam of the days") published in English under the title: Froth on the Daydream. Sartre and Michelle Vian began a relationship that eventually destroyed Vian's marriage.

Despite his literary work becoming more important, Vian never left the jazz scene. He became a regular contributor to jazz-related magazines, and played trumpet at Le Tabou. As a result, his financial situation improved, and he abandoned the job at the AFNOR. Vian also formed his own choir, La petite chorale de Saint-Germain-des-Pieds [sic].

=== Later years ===
Vian's daughter, Carole, was born in 1948. He continued his literary career by writing Vernon Sullivan novels, and also published poetry collections: Barnum's Digest (1948) and Cantilènes en gelée (Cantelinas in Jelly, 1949).

Vian started writing plays, the first of which, L'Équarrissage pour tous (Slaughter for Everyone), was staged the year it was written, 1950. The same year he published his third major novel, L'Herbe rouge (The Red Grass). This was a much darker story than its predecessors, centering on a man who built a giant machine that could help him psychoanalyze his soul. Like the previous two books, it did not sell well. Since Vian's financial situation had been steadily worsening since late 1948, he was forced to take up translation of English-language literature and articles in order to get by.

Vian and his wife separated in this period. In 1950 he met Ursula Kübler (1928–2010), a Swiss dancer, and the two started an affair. In 1951 Vian divorced Michelle. He married Ursula in 1954.

Vian's last novel, L'Arrache-cœur (The Heartsnatcher), was published in 1953, but earned only poor sales. Vian effectively stopped writing fiction. The only work that he published after 1953 was a revised version of L'automne à Pékin (1956).

He concentrated on a new field, song-writing and performing, and continued writing poetry. Vian's songs were successful; in 1954 he embarked on his first tour as singer-songwriter. By 1955, when he was working as record producer for Philips, Vian was active in a wide variety of fields: song-writing, opera, screenplays and several more plays. His first album, Chansons possibles et impossibles (Possible and Impossible Songs), was recorded in 1955. He wrote the first French rock and roll songs with his friend Henri Salvador, who sang them under the nickname Henry Cording. He also wrote "Java Pour Petula" (a song about an English girl arriving in France, written in Parisian argot) for Petula Clark's first concert performances in France.

In 1955, Vian decided also to perform some of his songs on stage himself. He had been unhappy about the fact that French singer Marcel Mouloudji (1922–1994), who had interpreted "Le Deserteur" (The Deserter) on stage the year before, had not accepted the original lyrics because he thought that they would lead to the song being banned. Vian accepted a change to one verse, but the song was banned from TV and radio channels until 1967. The record of Vian's songs performed by himself was not successful in France until ten years after his death.

Vian's life was endangered in 1956 by a pulmonary edema, but he survived and continued working with the same intensity as before. In 1957, Vian completed another play: Les Bâtisseurs d'empire (The Empire Builders), which was not published and staged until 1959. In 1958, Vian worked on the opera Fiesta with Darius Milhaud. A collection of his essays, En avant la zizique... Et par ici les gros sous (On with the Muzak... And Bring in the Big Bucks), was published the same year.

=== Death ===
On the morning of 23 June 1959, Vian was at the Cinéma Marbeuf for the screening of the film version of his I Spit on Your Grave. He had already fought with the producers over their interpretation of his work. He publicly denounced the film, stating that he wished to have his name removed from the credits. A few minutes after the film began, he reportedly blurted out: "These guys are supposed to be American? My ass!" He collapsed onto his seat and died of a sudden cardiac arrest on his way to the hospital.

=== Legacy ===
During his lifetime, only the novels published under the name of Vernon Sullivan were successful. Those published under his real name, which had real literary value in his eyes, remained a commercial failure, despite the support of prominent writers of the time.

Almost immediately after his death, L'Écume des jours, and then L'automne à Pékin, L'Arrache-cœur, and L'Herbe rouge, began to gain recognition in France. They were taken up by the young in the 1960s and 1970s.

As a songwriter, Vian had mixed success. When he decided that he should sing the songs that were rejected by the stars, he reached only a limited audience (including Léo Ferré and Georges Brassens). The public rejected his singing performances. But the May 1968 in France generation, even more than the previous ones, loved his songs, especially because of their impertinence.

As a songwriter, Vian inspired Serge Gainsbourg, who used to attend his show at the cabaret Les Trois Baudets. Thirty years later, Gainsbourg wrote: "I took it on the chin [...], he sang terrific things [...], it is because I heard him that I decided to try something interesting". As a critic, Boris Vian was the first to support Gainsbourg in Le Canard enchaîné, in 1957.

Over the years, Vian's works have become modern classics, often celebrated and selected as subjects for study in schools. Vian is still viewed by many as the emblematic figure of Saint Germain des Prés as it existed during the postwar decade, when this district was the centre of artistic and intellectual life in Paris.

== Selected bibliography ==
=== Prose ===
==== Novels ====
- Trouble dans les andains (Turmoil in the Swaths) (1942–43, published posthumously in 1966 by La Jeune Parque)
- Vercoquin et le plancton (Vercoquin and the Plankton) (1943–45, published 1947 by Éditions Gallimard)
- L'Écume des jours (Foam of the Days) (1946, published 1947 by Éditions Gallimard; translated variously as Froth on the Daydream, Mood Indigo and Foam of the Daze)
- L'Automne à Pékin (Autumn in Peking) (1946, published 1947 by Éditions du Scorpion, revised version published in 1956; Autumn in Peking)
- L'Herbe rouge (The Red Grass) (1948–49, published 1950 by Éditions Toutain)
- L'Arrache-cœur (Heartsnatcher) (1947–1951, published 1953 by Éditions Vrille; Heartsnatcher)
- On n'y échappe pas (published posthumously)

==== Vernon Sullivan novels ====
- J'irai cracher sur vos tombes (I Shall Spit on Your Graves) (Éditions du Scorpion, 1946)
- Les morts ont tous la même peau (The Dead All Have the Same Skin) (Éditions du Scorpion, 1947)
- Et on tuera tous les affreux (To Hell With the Ugly) (Éditions du Scorpion, 1948)
- Elles se rendent pas compte (They Do Not Realize) (1948–50, published 1950 by Éditions du Scorpion)

==== Short story collections ====
- Les Fourmis (The Ants) (1944–47, published 1949 by Éditions du Scorpion)
- Les Lurettes fourrées (Ages Fulfilled) (1948–49, published 1950 by Le Livre de Poche as an addendum to their edition of L'Herbe rouge)
- Le Ratichon baigneur (Toothy Bather) (1946–52, published posthumously in 1981 by Éditions Bourgois)
- Le Loup-garou (The Werewolf) (1945–53?, published posthumously in 1970 by Éditions Bourgois)

=== Dramatic works ===
- L'Équarrissage pour tous (Knackery for All), play (1947, published 1950 by Éditions Toutain), published in English as The Knacker's ABC.
- Le Dernier des métiers (The Last of the Trades), play (1950, published 1965 by Éditions Pauvert)
- Tête de Méduse (Medusa's Head), comedy in one act (1951, published 1971 by U.G.E.)
- Série Blême (Pallid Series), tragedy in three acts (1952?, published 1971 by U.G.E.)
- Le Chasseur français (The French Hunter), vaudeville (1955, published 1971 by U.G.E.)
- Les Bâtisseurs d'Empire (The Empire Builders), (1957, published 1959 by Collège de 'Pataphysique)
- Le Goûter des généraux (The Snack of Generals), (1951, published 1962 by Collège de 'Pataphysique)

=== Poetry ===
- Barnum's Digest (1948, a collection of 10 poems)
- Cantilènes en gelée (Cantelinas in Jelly) (1949)
- Je voudrais pas crever (I'd prefer not to die) (posthumously published in 1962)

=== Translations ===
- The Big Sleep by Raymond Chandler as Le grand sommeil (1948)
- The Lady in the Lake by Raymond Chandler as La dame du lac (1948)
- The World of Null-A by A. E. van Vogt, as Le Monde des Ã (1958)

=== Other works ===
- Manuel de St-Germain-des-Prés, originally commissioned to be a tourist guide to the St-Germain-des-Prés district (published 1950 by Éditions Toutain)

== Selected discography ==
- Nouveau code de la route 1955 (1955)
- Chansons possibles et impossibles (1956)

== See also ==
- Boris Vian (in French)
- Existentialism
- Pataphysics
- Zazou
- Amour de poche (1957)
