= L'Équarrissage pour tous =

Play by Boris Vian

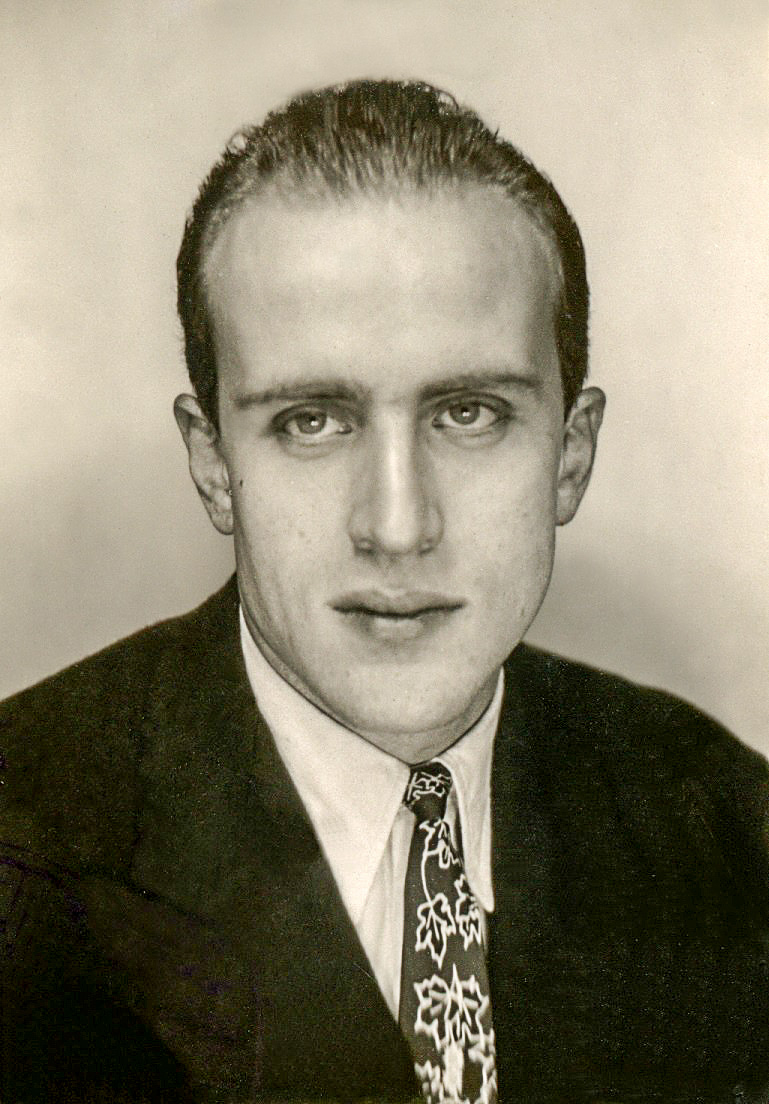
- Boris Vian's photo booth picture, taken from his driver's license (Boris Vian archives)
- Written by: Boris Vian
- Characters: The Father, butcher; the Mother; the Neighbor; Mary daughter of the butcher; Mary then Cyprienne, second daughter of the butcher; Jacques, son of the butcher; Catherine; daughter of the butcher; André then Jacqueline; apprentice; Heinz, German soldier; German soldiers; American soldiers, etc.
- Genre: Comedy satirical

Premiere
- Date: 14 April 1950

L'Équarrissage pour tous (English: Dog Culling for Everyone) is a play by Boris Vian, originally written in 1947 as a three-act anarchic farce and revised in 1948 into a single act. Set during the Allied liberation of France in 1944, specifically on D-Day, the play is a satirical work characterized by strong antimilitarist themes. Through derision and burlesque, it critiques war, aspects of American society—such as imperialism, puritanism, and propaganda—and the institution of the family.

After difficulties in securing a director and cast, L'Équarrissage pour tous was eventually staged by André Reybaz and the Compagnie du Myrmidon. The premiere took place on 14 April 1950 at the Théâtre des Noctambules and was initially well received by the audience. However, several theatre critics who had previously expressed amusement published negative reviews the following day, criticizing the play's content. Others, including Jean Cocteau and René Barjavel, offered more favorable assessments. Attendance declined, and the play was withdrawn from the program in May. The incident contributed to Boris Vian's growing dissatisfaction with critics, whose "papers" he referenced in the first published edition of the play later that year.

== The play ==
=== Synopsis ===
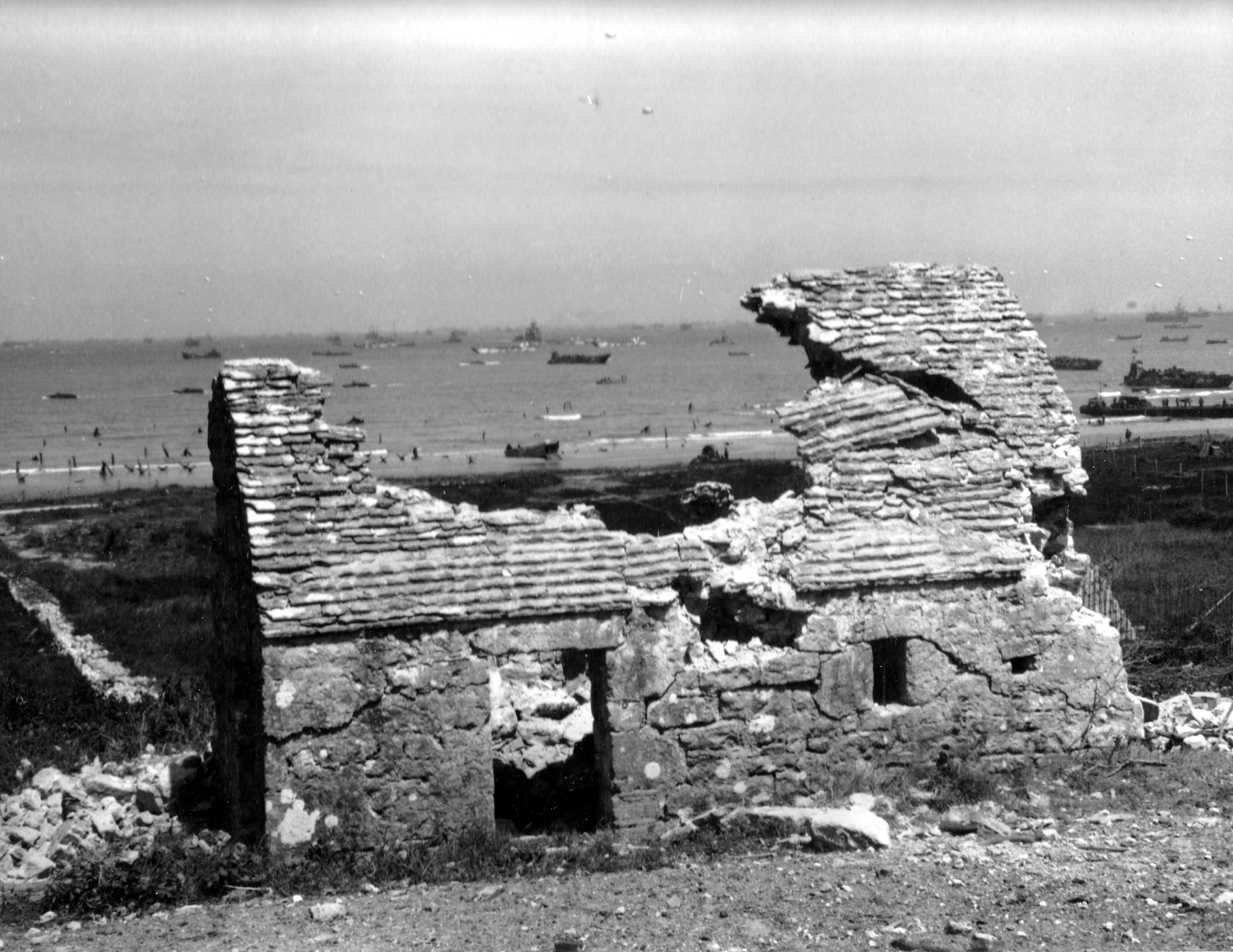
The context of the play: the Normandy landings, D-Day.

Arromanches, 6 June 1944: while the Allied forces land in Europe, the protagonist of the play, a knacker indifferent to the surrounding destruction and the broader geopolitical events, is preoccupied with arranging the marriage of his daughter to a German soldier who has been residing in his home and with whom she has had a longstanding relationship. He invites another daughter, a paratrooper in the Red Army, and his son, a paratrooper in the American army, to the wedding. Military personnel from various factions—including Japanese, American, and German—also arrive and engage in many forms of excess. Ultimately, most characters end up at the knacker's yard. (Note: According to the summary of the play by René Barjavel, cited by Boggio.)

=== Characters ===
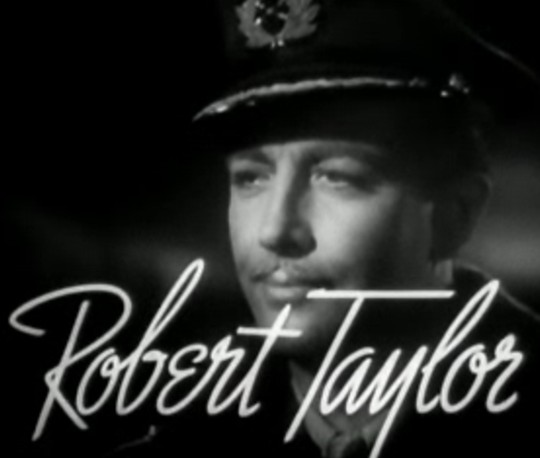
Robert Taylor, who plays the American pastor of the same name in the play.

- The Father, knacker: (Note: The details indicated in italics are those mentioned in the play's cast list.) André Reybaz
- The Mother (first name: Marie)
- The Neighbour
- Marie, daughter of the knacker
- Marie then Cyprienne, second daughter of the knacker, renamed during the play to avoid misunderstandings: Nicole Jonesco
- Jacques, son of the knacker, enlisted as a paratrooper in the American army: Jacques Verrières.
- Catherine, daughter of the knacker, paratrooper in the Red Army: Zanie Campan
- André then Jacqueline, apprentice (later presented as his son)
- Heinz (Schnittermach), German soldier, Marie's lover
- The Postwoman
- Four German soldiers
- Kûnsterlich, German captain
- Robert Taylor, American pastor
- Four American soldiers
- The Japanese paratrooper
- Vincent, an old FFI member
- Colonel Loriot, fourteen years old, FFI
- Two nuns
- The French captain
- The French lieutenant
- Bobby, French scout
- Two Salvation Army members (Note: They do not appear in the original stage directions but are included in the list of roles established for the first performance.) (Note: The mentions in italics correspond to the stage directions in the text.)

Full cast: André Reybaz, Jacques Muller, Yvette Lucas, Nicole Jonesco, Jacques Verrière, Zanie Campan, Jean Mauvais, Paul Crauchet, Guy Saint-Jean, René Lafforgue, Roger Paschel, M. Ehrard.

=== Themes addressed ===
According to d'Déé, this early work by Boris Vian is his first to adopt a political and social dimension, addressing "a chaotic period of attempts to reorganize morality, institutions, alliances, after the turmoil of a deadly war." The play explores three central themes: war and antimilitarism, aspects of American civilization, and the family.

==== War, antimilitarism, democracy; Last-minute resistance fighters ====
Antimilitarism is a recurring theme in the works of Boris Vian. In L'Équarrissage pour tous, it is treated in a satirical manner, while in Le Goûter des généraux it becomes a central focus. The play also includes a critique of certain aspects of "imperialism." (Note: According to Marc Lapprand, who refers to “a certain anti-imperialism.”) Similar to the 1954 sketch Air Force (Note: Renamed "Air Farce" when the play, after its success at the cabaret La Rose Rouge, was extended for nine months at Les Trois Baudets.) from Cinémassacre, in which a soldier no longer remembers the reasons for fighting, the American soldiers in L'Équarrissage pour tous display only a vague understanding of the conflict. As in the other works, war is portrayed as being conducted in the name of democracy, (Note: In Air Farce, the sole victim of a Soviet bombing, the dog of one of the pilots, serves retrospectively as justification for the war: “That’s why we’re fighting, Jimmy... it’s against the injustice that allows, from one second to the next and without remorse, the barbarians to exterminate an innocent creature. It’s so that justice, fairness, and democracy may reign from one end of the earth to the other...” In L'Équarrissage pour tous, the soldiers discussing the landing at Arromanches “can see no other valid reason than to ascribe it to democracy.”) which is repeatedly mocked. In one example, when the knacker asks whether "democracy yields good results," a soldier responds, "We can't know, it's secret."

Boris Vian expressed a strong opposition to war, which he viewed as absurd and unjust, and criticized military institutions and their symbolism. (Note: See also his statements in a letter to Paul Faber, about Le Déserteur: “this subject compels me to speak of the worst of creations, that of armed masses, of the military regime, which I hate; I profoundly despise anyone who can, with pleasure, march in rows and formations, to the sound of music; it can only be by mistake that he was given a brain; a spinal cord would suffice entirely. [...] How vile and contemptible war seems to me.”) In L'Équarrissage pour tous, American and German soldiers are portrayed with derision, and nationalism is satirized. Gilbert Pestureau highlights that scenes such as strip poker games, the exchange of uniforms, and the singing of each other's national songs—Germans singing Happy Birthday and Americans performing a German tune—illustrate the idea that "military identity is interchangeable, and patriotism is just a garment." The presence of two of the knacker's children, one serving in the American army and the other in the Red Army, symbolically positions the future Cold War adversaries as morally equivalent, challenging the "simplistic vision of Liberation" and the perceived hypocrisy surrounding its commemoration.

Last-minute resistance fighters are also criticized, including two FFI members who were converted on the morning of the events. According to Gilbert Pestureau, this portrayal questions the overall Resistance, with Boris Vian aiming to show that the Resistance was carried out by a minority.

The peak of the satire occurs when the knacker's house, the only remaining structure amid the ruins, is demolished by a representative of the Ministry of Reconstruction for not being "aligned."

==== American civilization ====
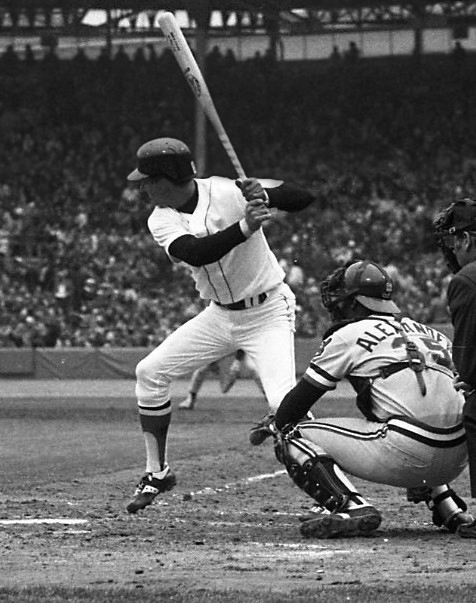
According to Boris Vian, baseball is, along with Coca-Cola, “the other American national sport,” which compensates for the frustration caused by puritanism.

In addition to criticizing American imperialism, Boris Vian addresses two other aspects of American culture in the play. Puritanism is represented by a soldier who reacts with offense when questioned about his relationship with his war godmother, responding, “You're disgusting,” and “I can't answer you. This isn't a proper conversation.” (Note: Marc Lapprand emphasizes that the same kind of criticism can be found in Les Chroniques du menteur, when Vian explains in his way the reasons for Henry Miller’s visit to France (who, like him at the time of I Spit on Your Graves, was harshly criticized for a work deemed obscene): “Americans don’t... well... they rarely do. Never before marriage in any case.” A frustration that leads, by compensation, to the practice of baseball (and Coca-Cola, described as another national sport).) The presence of a pastor further underscores this puritanism and introduces a critique of American propaganda. The pastor, named Robert Taylor, shares characteristics with his Hollywood namesake. A character named Catherine comments: “That's exactly it—American civilization. Propaganda and always propaganda. They have pastors, and they have to give them movie star names. And you all buy into it...”

==== The family ====
In the knacker's family, the father is authoritarian and does not recall the exact number or genders of his children. The mother is emotionally distressed and frequently cries. The son André observes his sister through a peephole in her bedroom wall, created by enlarging a hole in a board. Another son, Jacques, refers to their father as an idiot for never having been intimate with his daughter. Both brothers, seeking “precise details” about Marie's relationship with Heinz and whether she is pregnant, restrain her to a workbench and, in a scene reminiscent of interrogation, use a feather to compel her to confess.

=== Style ===
The satire is presented in a humorous and unconventional manner. It has been described as an "anarchic vaudeville" and as “Ubu-knacker among the Branquignols” by René Barjavel; the first description was later adopted by Boris Vian for the text's publication and the play's poster. Gilbert Pestureau characterizes it as an iconoclastic farce. (Note: “It was quite a bold move in 1947 to throw all warriors into the same grotesque bag, the same nauseating knacker’s pit.”) Unlike I Spit on Your Graves, which was written on commission, this play reflects Boris Vian’s distinctive personal style. Although criticized for its irreverent tone toward resistance fighters, Vian explained his approach: “The play is rather burlesque: it seemed to me better to make people laugh at the expense of war; it's a sneakier way to attack it, but more effective—and in any case, to hell with effectiveness...” (Note: “The play is rather burlesque: it seemed to me better to make fun of war; it’s a more insidious way of attacking it, but more effective — and anyway, to hell with effectiveness... If I continue in this tone, people will think it’s a propaganda show for men of goodwill.”)

The humor in the play is derived from theatrical techniques rather than linguistic innovation or wordplay, as seen in Vian's novels. It relies on exaggeration and absurdity, including the infantilization of the military by the main character—for example, asking, “Heinz, aren't you supposed to be fighting with your comrades?” Colonel Loriot is described as fourteen years old, (Note: Mention indicated in the initial stage direction describing the play's characters and in scene XXXV.) and along with another FFI member, Vincent, they are portrayed as resistance fighters converted that very morning. The characters’ unexpected reactions add to the play's absurdity. For instance, Marie, the knacker's wife, initially appears quiet and timid but later resists her husband's abuse, delivering “a tremendous punch in the stomach,” according to the stage directions, and attempting to knock him out with a dish before falling into the knacker's pit near the end of the act.

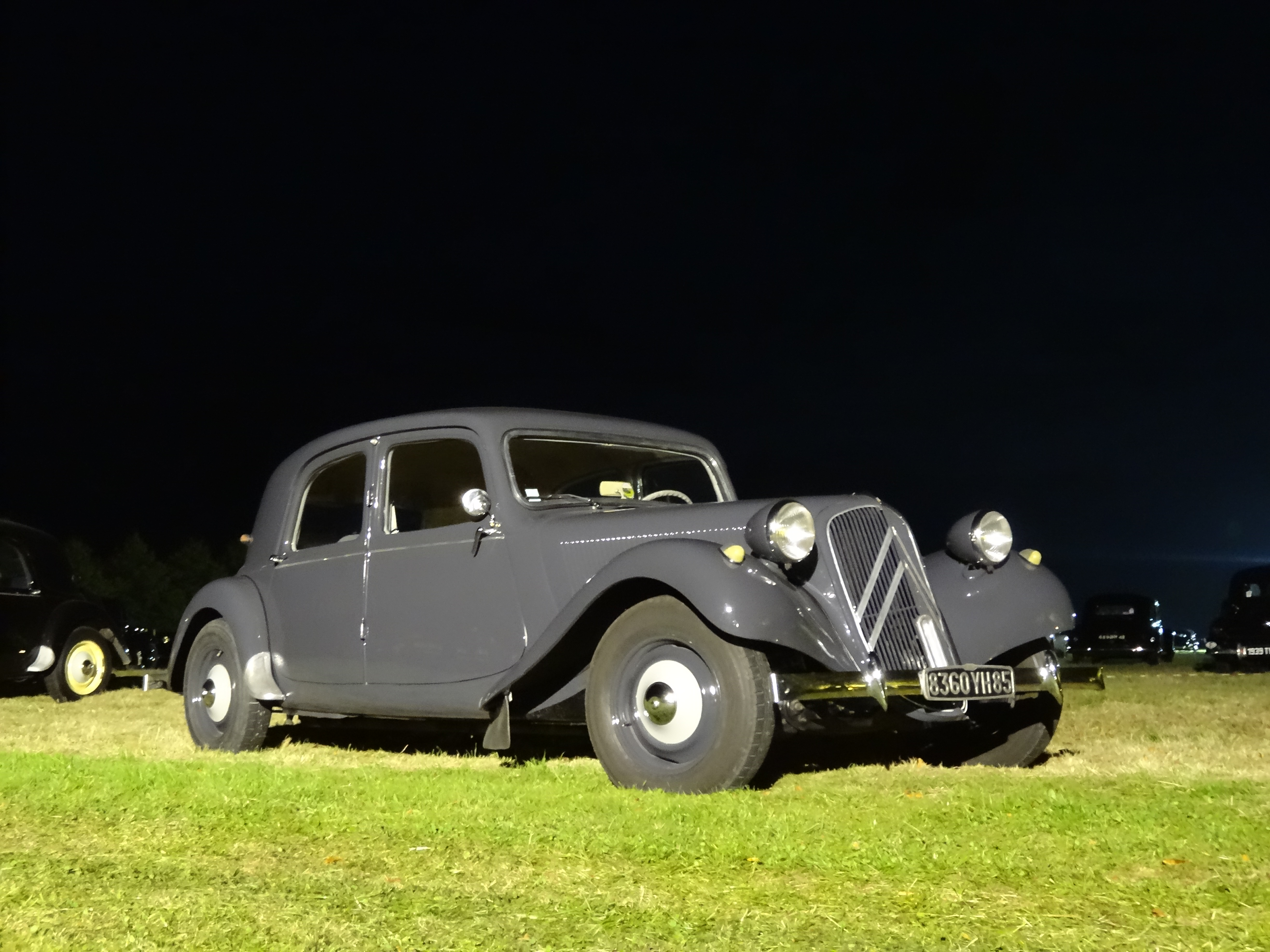
A Traction Avant, an iconic vehicle of the Resistance, adorned with the FFI logo painted in large white letters on its doors.

d'Déé also notes the abundance of allusions and references to various values in the play, stating that “they should all be cited, but the footnotes would then be longer than the play itself.” Among these is an ironic reference to the BBC's coded messages, depicted in the scene where the father and André write a telegram to inform other family members about the upcoming wedding:

André: I’m thinking. What if we sent them a message like this: Come back immediately for family council. Is Marie getting married?
Postwoman: That’s not very original. Sounds like a telegram.
Father: Radio Londres won’t accept that. We have to send them a clear message. No summary.
[…]
Father: Wait… There! The knacker awaits his two children for their sister’s wedding. I’m telling you, it has to be clear, otherwise people could misunderstand and take advantage of it to wreck everything, steal some Citroën Tractions, and cover them with white paint.

— Scene XX

== Writing process ==
In February 1947, Boris Vian initially conceived the idea as a novel, outlining a story set in the countryside during the war involving five sons—American, German, French, Russian, and Eskimo—parachuting into a farm and ultimately killing each other. He later chose to develop the concept as a three-act play, which he completed in two months.

Boris Vian presented the play to Jacques Lemarchand, a member of Gallimard’s reading committee, who praised the work but noted issues with the rhythm of the second act and the difficulty of staging the third act, which he described as “only be played by clowns with fifteen years of training.” Lemarchand considered the subject “excellent—scandalous and sure to make people howl,” but warned that finding theatre directors willing to stage the play might be challenging. (Note: Boris Vian later agreed to revise at least a few scenes, including the “tickling” scene, which was originally a scene of actual torture. In a letter addressed to the “Chair meter” and signed “Votre des vouet, Baurice Vyent,” he informs Jacques Lemarchand of ongoing negotiations and seeks his opinion on a few changes, including this one: “They asked me for a few modiphications including primo) removal of the torture in the second hact which I replaced with a tickling twoième)[...]”) After receiving positive feedback relayed by Lemarchand, Jean Paulhan suggested publishing a shortened extract of the first act in Cahiers de la Pléiade, limited to 25 pages. Vian agreed, and the text appeared in issue no. 4 of Cahiers in spring 1948. This prompted him to revise the play into a condensed, single-act format.

Boris Vian received limited interest from three directors—Jean-Pierre Grenier, Olivier Hussenot, and Roger Blin—whom he described as giving a “timid” response. In early 1949, Jean-Louis Barrault expressed interest but repeatedly delayed scheduling. Growing impatient, Vian eventually entrusted the premiere to André Reybaz, who had secured funding to stage the play with his Compagnie du Myrmidon. After initial difficulties in casting, the play was finally produced following some last-minute adjustments.

The final version of the play, with a runtime of 1 hour and 15 minutes, was considered too short. To complement it, Boris Vian wrote Le Dernier des métiers, an anti-clerical farce featuring homosexual innuendos. Its main character, Reverend Father Soreilles, believes himself to be a music hall actor while delivering sermons based on works by contemporary religious figures, including Jean Genet. Although the actors of the Compagnie du Myrmidon appreciated the skit's humor, the theater director, "shocked by the profaning tone of this tragedy" in Vian's words, chose to stage Sa Peau, a one-act play by Audiberti, after L'Équarrissage to extend the run.

The final version of the play, accompanied by Le Dernier des métiers and preceded by a critique titled Salut à Boris Vian by Jean Cocteau written after the premiere, was published in the second half of 1950 by Toutain publishers. In his foreword, Boris Vian states:

I regret being one of those to whom war inspires neither patriotic reflexes, nor martial jaw movements, nor murderous enthusiasm (Rosalie, Rosalie!), nor poignant and emotional good-nature, nor sudden piety — nothing but a desperate, total anger against the absurdity of battles that are battles of words but kill men of flesh. A powerless anger, unfortunately; among other things, there is then one means of escape: mockery.

== Reception ==
=== First performances and reviews ===
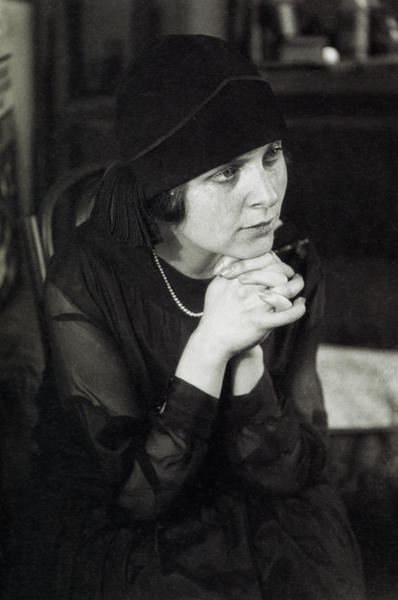
Elsa Triolet in 1925, author of a scathing critique twenty-five years later.

The dress rehearsal took place on 11 April 1950, with many critics in attendance. According to André Reybaz, the performance was met with frequent laughter, applause, and acclaim, causing the finale to start half an hour late. Similar reactions were observed during the premiere on April 14, including from critics who reportedly expressed their enjoyment.

The following days saw mostly negative newspaper reviews. Although André Reybaz's staging and the actors’ performances were widely praised, at least half of the fourteen published reviews were critical. (Note: Philippe Boggio considers that only three reviews were flattering: those by Marc Beigbeder in Le Parisien libéré, Michel Déon in Aspects de la France, and René Barjavel in Carrefour. Benoît Barut counts “seven that are more or less clearly favorable to the play and seven where the criticism is openly negative.”) Elsa Triolet, writing in Les Lettres françaises, criticized Boris Vian for his choice of the landing period, describing it as a “sublime” moment that he trivialized, (Note: “Mr. Boris Vian, for whom I feel a deep aversion because of the vileness of his spitting, has written a historical play being performed at the Théâtre des Noctambules. He takes a ‘sublime’ period and sits on it. But he sits on it with just the weight of a songster, a puppet-show character, a village idiot. Let us be clear, a village idiot seen through the window of a Saint-Germain-des-Prés basement, devoid of innocence and with enough experience to temper its expression.”) while expressing “a strong antipathy for the ignominy of his spitting.” Guy Verdot, in Franc-Tireur, questioned the play's subject matter by asking, “And why not an operetta about concentration camps?” Some critics also directed personal attacks at Vian. Max Favalelli, in Ici Paris, mockingly referred to him as “Boris Viandox” and repeatedly called the work “Boris Viande.” Others accused Vian of deliberately seeking scandal.

Audience attendance declined in subsequent performances, and the play was replaced on the program by The Bald Soprano by Eugène Ionesco on 11 May 1950.

=== Boris Vian's counter-critique ===
Boris Vian was hurt by the criticism, although he tried to maintain a good face and joke about it. André Reybaz wrote: “A cold rage animated Boris. I sensed it in the threatening calm that precedes storms, in a slightly fixed smile, in a complexion that was not pale, but absinthe-colored.” This episode, among others, contributed to Vian's total contempt for the profession of critic. In 1947, in response to both positive and negative reviews of I Shall Spit on Your Graves, he had already launched his famous retort: “Critics, you are calves!” He reproached critics for focusing more on peripheral aspects—such as the identity or personality of the author—than on the story in the book, or books in general. During the first publication of the play in late 1950 by Toutain, Vian included a “press dossier” as an appendix. Arguing from a principle of neutrality, he published each of the fourteen reviews in alphabetical order and responded to some of them in a dialogue form, mocking their authors.

To Jean-Baptiste Jeener, who wrote in Le Figaro: “This appetite for scandal bears only the pale face of wrongdoing and imposture...” and criticized the line: “I didn't see any English here” and the reply “We’re fighting here,” Boris Vian responded: “Let me inform you, Mr. Jeener, of a notable improvement introduced (following your suggestions) in the aforementioned text, here it is in substance:

The neighbor: Noticed? There's no English!

The father: We land here, we don't re-embark.

"Thus, thanks to you, people still laugh, but now they know why. I say thanks to you, because if you had understood right away that there was a clever allusion to Dunkirk, we would never have thought of introducing this pertinent improvement.”

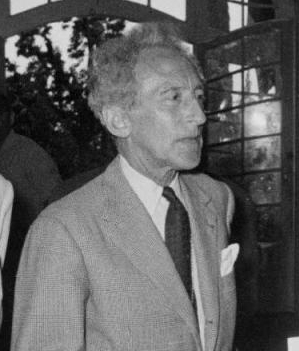
Jean Cocteau, the play's most fervent defender among critics.

When Guy Verdot of Franc-Tireur expressed outrage with the question, “Why not concentration camps?” he added puns: “We expected a boom. It's just hot air. Let's say: a breeze. If the author is counting on this to trigger the tornado of scandal, it's because he's never consulted an anemometer, at Arromanches or elsewhere.” Boris Vian ironically introduced the article with: “And let's end on a joyful note with Guy Verdot, of Franc-Tireur.” He then replied: “One will admire the incisiveness and depth of this critique. I like to think that Mr. Verdot devoted to me a fragment of his precious time which already gave us so many penetrating masterpieces. And then there is this idea of an operetta about concentration camps; but for that, I felt the talent failed me and I asked Mr. Verdot to write the verses for me. Finally, Mr. Verdot lamented the artificiality of our final dynamite crate; we offered to replace it with a real one, provided he came at least the first time. That was clever, wasn't it? He didn't come. Maybe next time...”

The other reviews were addressed in a similar manner.

The notably positive review Salut à Boris Vian, in which Jean Cocteau expressed clear and enthusiastic support for the play, was given special prominence, appearing separately at the beginning of the volume. This placement highlighted the distinction between Cocteau as a fully recognized author and the other critics, whom Boris Vian's staging depicted as parasites who do not create but merely repeat the author and each other, according to Benoît Barut's analysis.

In his foreword, Boris Vian reiterated ideas previously expressed on April 12 in the journal Opéra regarding his use of burlesque and mockery to address war, especially when anger proved ineffective. He clarified: “They said I was looking for scandal with L’Équarrissage, they were gravely mistaken [...] They said so mostly because it's easier to slap on a label than to take the trouble to listen.”

== Performances by notable companies ==
The play was performed:

- During the 1964–1965 season at the Théâtre des Saltimbanques in Montreal, directed by Pascal Desgranges;
- In March 1968 at the Théâtre des Hauts-de-Seine in Puteaux, directed by Jean Deninx;
- In February 1982 at the Théâtre de la Plaine in Paris, directed by Jean-Jacques Dulon.

== See also ==
- Boris Vian
- Satire
- Play (theatre)
- Bibliothèque de la Pléiade

== Bibliography ==
=== Books ===
- Arnaud, Noël (1998). Les Vies parallèles de Boris Vian [The Parallel Lives of Boris Vian] (in French). Paris: Le Livre de Poche. ISBN 2-253-14521-1.
- Boggio, Philippe (1993). Boris Vian (in French). Paris: Flammarion. ISBN 2-08-066734-3.
- Boggio, Philippe (1995). Boris Vian (in French). Paris: Le Livre de Poche. ISBN 978-2-253-13871-6.
- Lapprand, Marc (1993). Boris Vian La vie contre : Biographie critique [Boris Vian Life Against: A Critical Biography] (in French). A.-G. Nizet/Les Presses de l'université d'Ottawa. ISBN 2-7603-0366-7.
- Lapprand, Marc (2006). V comme Vian [V for Vian] (in French). Paris: Presses de l'Université Laval. ISBN 978-2-7637-8403-8.
- Vian, Boris; Pestureau, Gilbert (1998). L'Équarrissage pour tous suivi de Tête de Méduse et Série blême [L'Équarrissage pour tous followed by Tête de Méduse and Série blême] (in French). Paris: Le Livre de Poche. ISBN 9782253143703.
- Vian, Boris; Kübler, Ursula; Pestureau, Gilbert; Lapprand, Marc (2003). Œuvres - Tome neuvième [Works - Volume Nine] (in French). Fayard.
- Vian, Boris (2012). Les Morts ont tous la même peau [The dead all have the same skin] (in French). Paris: Le Livre de Poche. pp. 149–150. ISBN 978-2-253-14193-8.

=== Articles ===
- Barut, Benoît (2007). "Les dramaturges et leurs critiques. Poétiques paratextuelles de la riposte chez Victor Hugo et Boris Vian" [Playwrights and their critics. Paratextual poetics of retort in Victor Hugo and Boris Vian]. Tracés. Revue de Sciences humaines (in French) (13): 115–142. doi:10.4000/traces.315.
- Lapprand, Marc (2014). "Le discours politique de Boris Vian: référence et contre-référence / Boris Vian's political speech: reference and counter-reference" [Boris Vian's political speech: reference and counter-reference]. Australian Journal of French Studies (in French). Liverpool University Press. doi:10.3828/AJFS.28.1.69. ISSN 2046-2913.
- Pestureau, Gilbert (2014). "Boris Vian, témoin anarchiste de la Libération" [Boris Vian, anarchist witness to the Liberation]. French Cultural Studies (in French). 5 (15): 293–300. doi:10.1177/095715589400501509.
  - This text was republished in the ninth volume of Boris Vian's works, pages 1101-1108: the sources in the text refer to this page numbering.
