= Edmond Aman-Jean =

French painter

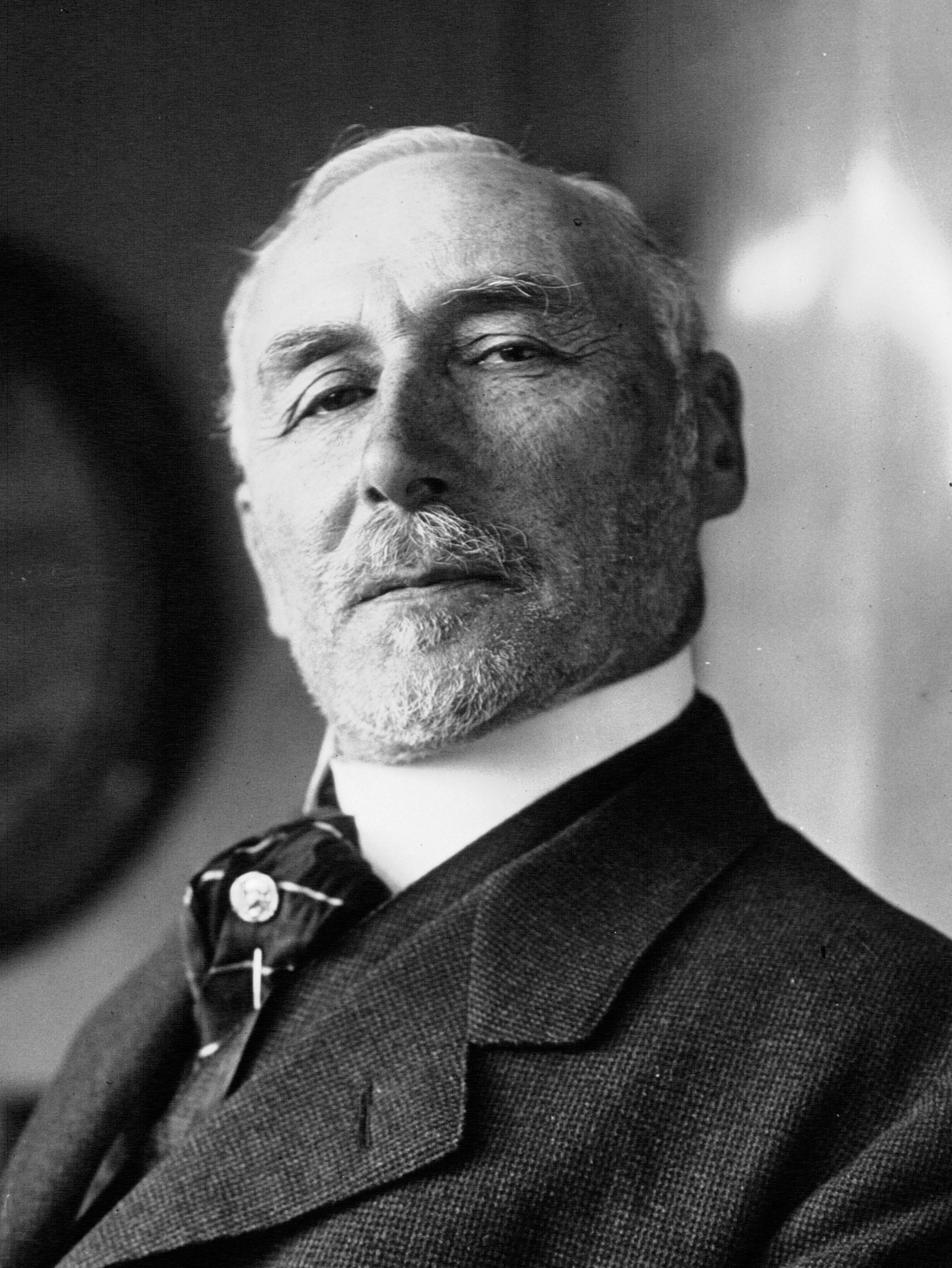
- Agence de presse Meurisse (Paris 1918)
- Born: 13 November 1858
- Died: 25 January 1936 (aged 77); Paris
- Education: École nationale supérieure des Beaux-Arts
- Occupations: Painter, French art critics
- Known for: portrait of a woman
- Movement: symbolist painter
- Honours: Commandeur de la Légion d'honneur

Signature
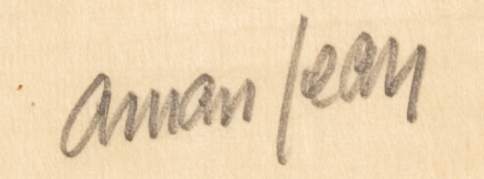

Edmond Aman-Jean (13 November 1858, Chevry-Cossigny – 25 January 1936, Paris) was a French symbolist painter, who co-founded the Salon des Tuileries in 1923.

== Life ==
His father was the owner and operator of an industrial lime kiln. He had his first art lessons with Henri Lehmann at the École nationale supérieure des Beaux-Arts, where he shared a workshop with Georges Seurat. He also befriended the Symbolist painters, Alphonse Osbert and Alexandre Séon.

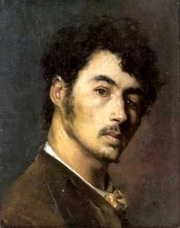
Self-portrait (date unknown)

In 1886, he obtained a travelling scholarship and went to Italy, together with Henri-Jean Guillaume Martin and Ernest Laurent; studying the Old Masters. Along with Seurat, he worked as an assistant to Puvis de Chavannes, helping him to realize several of his murals. In 1892, he painted a portrait of the poet, Paul Verlaine, during his convalescence for syphilis at the Hôpital Broussais in the 14th arrondissement of Paris. Verlaine dedicated a sonnet to him and they remained good friends until Verlaine's death in 1896.

He was also one of the first to recognize Joséphin Péladan as an important artist and exhibited at one of the first showings held at the Salon de la Rose + Croix. Later, he became an important teacher in his own right. His students included Charles Sydney Hopkinson, Theodor Pallady, and Nicolae Tonitza. In 1923, together with Albert Besnard and Auguste Rodin, he helped create the Salon des Tuileries. Ten years later, he was named a Commander in the Legion of Honour.

In 1892, he married Thadée Jacquet, the daughter of an Imperial Prefect, who was also a painter. They had two children, François, who became a well-known writer, and Céline, who was a painter and illustrator.

== Art ==
Aman-Jean established his reputation primarily for his portraits, especially of female subjects; he was also noted for his murals in public and official buildings, including the Sorbonne. Like many French artists of his generation, he was influenced by the new perspectives on Japanese art current in Paris in his day; more unusually, he was interested in the Pre-Raphaelite artists in England.

He was a close friend of Georges Seurat; the two artists shared a Paris studio in 1879. Art historian Robert Herbert called Seurat's portrait of Aman-Jean, "one of the great portrait drawings of the nineteenth century." It was the first work Seurat showed, at the Paris Salon in 1883. Aman-Jean also worked in lithography and printmaking and designed posters.

Works of Aman-Jean

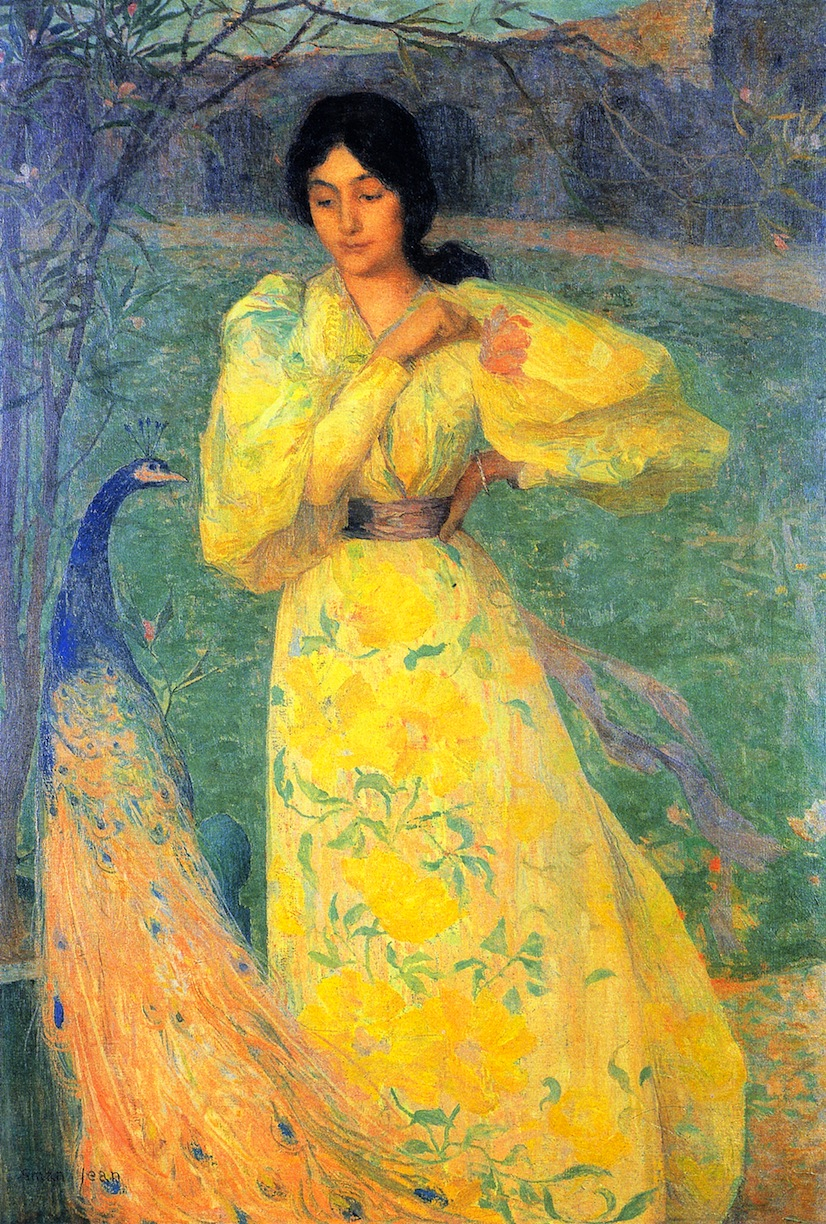
Young Girl with Peacock, huile sur toile (1895)

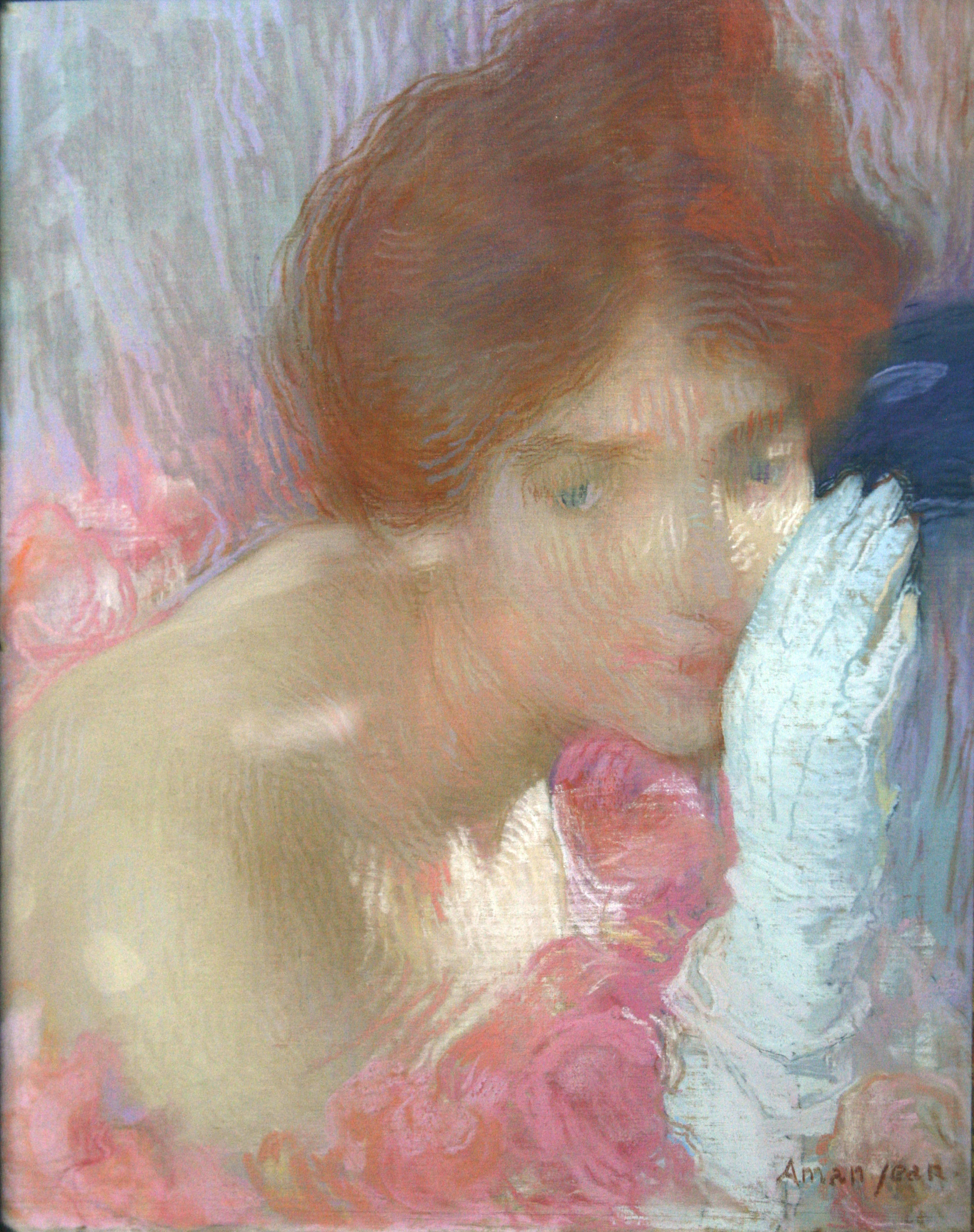
Woman with Glove, pastel (vers 1900 -1902)

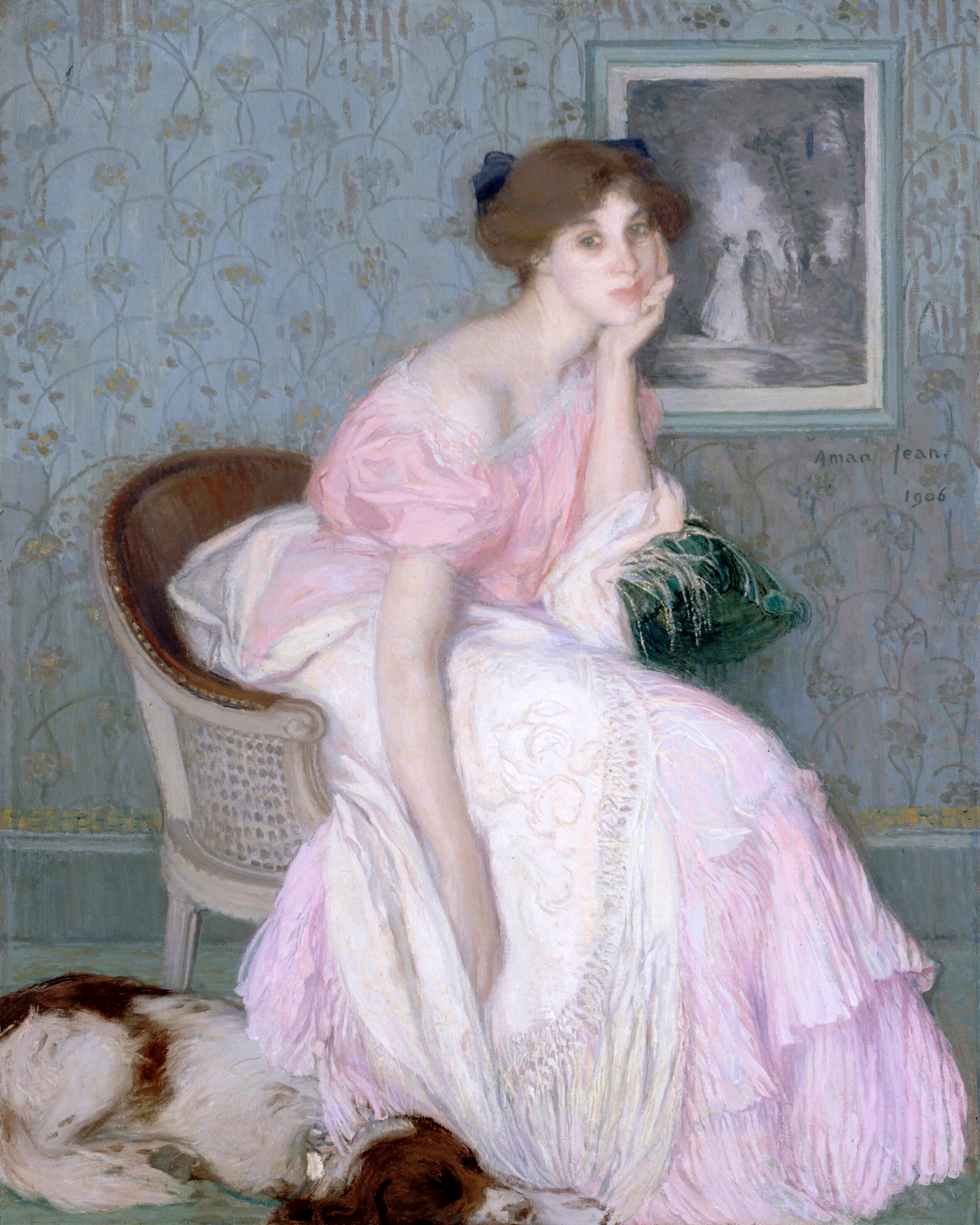
Portrait of Miss Ella Carmichaël(1906)

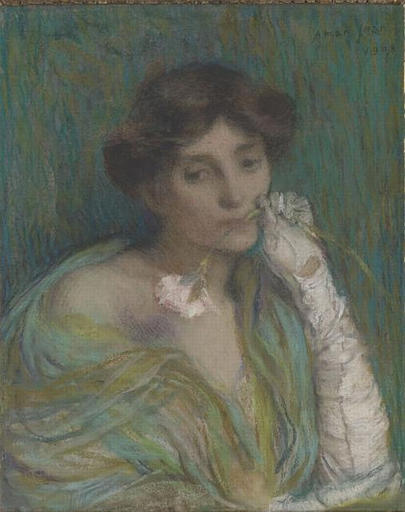
Femme à l'œillet (1908), pastel (1908)
