= Théâtre des Noctambules =

Theatre in Paris, France

Coordinates: 48.8496°N 2.3429°E

The Théâtre des Noctambules was a former Parisian cabaret established in 1894 by the chansonnier Martial Boyer (1872–1941) and located at 7 rue Champollion in the 5th arrondissement of Paris (Latin Quarter).

In 1939, Pierre Leuris and Jean Claude turned it into a theatre. Fernand Voiturin became manager in 1952 until the venue closed down in June 1956, when the theatre was turned into a Revival house (Art et Essai) under the same name.

The Bald Soprano by Eugène Ionesco premiered in this venue in 1950.

== Repertoire ==
- 1940 : Le Loup-Garou by Roger Vitrac, directed by Raymond Rouleau (27 February)
- 1941 : Le Bout de la route by Jean Giono, directed by Pierre Leuris (30 May)
- 1941 : Le Pain des hommes by Jean-Charles Pichon, directed by France Guy
- 1945 : Le Mal de lune by René-Marill Albères, directed by Pierre Leuris and Jean-Claude Leuris (January)
- 1945 : The Dance of Death by August Strindberg, directed by Jean Vilar (1 February)
- 1946 : Amphitryon by Molière, le Rideau des Jeunes (Februaryr)
- 1946 : Les Incendiaires by Maurice Clavel, directed by Jean Vernier (12 April)
- 1946 : Ghosts by Henrik Ibsen, directed by Jean Vilar (December)
- 1947 : The Exception and the Rule by Bertolt Brecht, directed by Jean-Marie Serreau
- 1947 : Les Épiphanies by Henri Pichette, directed by Georges Vitaly (2 December)
- 1948 : Docteur Hinterland by Jean Josipovici, directed by Jean Mercure (January)
- 1948 : Spectacle Tchekhov : Le Chant du cygne, On the Harmful Effects of Tobacco, A Marriage Proposal, The Bear, directed by Pierre Assy (March)
- 1949 : Pas d'amour by Ugo Betti, adaptation Maurice Clavel, directed by Michel Vitold
- 1949 : Clara by Jean de Beer, directed by Jacques Reynier (December)
- 1949 : Les Mamelles de Tirésias by Guillaume Apollinaire, directed by Clément Harari (29 avril)
- 1949 : Hop Signor ! and Fastes d'enfer by Michel de Ghelderode, directed by André Reybaz (22 November)
- 1950 : Destin à vendre by Paul Herenne, directed by Jean-Claude Dumontier (January)
- 1950 : L’Ampelour by Jacques Audiberti, directed by André Reybaz (February)
- 1950 : Sire Halewyn by Michel de Ghelderode, directed by Catherine Toth (February)
- 1950 : L'Équarrissage pour tous by Boris Vian and Sa peau by Jacques Audiberti, directed by André Reybaz (11 April)
- 1950 : The Bald Soprano by Eugène Ionesco, directed by Nicolas Bataille (11 May)
- 1950 : La Grande et la Petite Manœuvre by Arthur Adamov, directed by Roger Blin (11 November)
- 1951 : Danse sans musique by Henri-Charles Richard and Albert Gray after Peter Cheyney, directed by René Clermont (19 February)
- 1951 : Survivre by Michel Philippot, directed by Émile Dars (17 April)
- 1952 : Electra by Sophocles, adaptation Maurice Clavel, directed by Albert Médina (April)
- 1952 : Les Fous de Dieu by Friedrich Dürrenmatt, directed by Catherine Toth (20 November)
- 1952 : Doña Rosita de Federico García Lorca, directed by Claude Régy (December)
- 1953 : L'École des bouffons de Michel de Ghelderode, directed by André Reybaz
- 1953 : The Merchant of Venice by Shakespeare
- 1953 : L'Île aux chèvres d'Ugo Betti, directed by Pierre Valde (21 April)
- 1953 : Three plays in one act, directed by Sacha Pitoëff (July) :
  - L'Épouse injustement soupçonnée by Jean Cocteau
  - Le Gardien des oiseaux by François Aman-Jean
  - Dolorès au balcon by Edmond Jacquet
- 1953 : Les Hussards by Pierre-Aristide Bréal, directed by Jacques Fabbri (15 December)
- 1954 : Negro Spiritual by Yves Jamiaque, directed by Marcel Lupovici (29 November)
- 1955 : La Surprise de l'amour by Marivaux, directed by Robert Postec (February)
- 1955 : Le Ping-pong by Arthur Adamov, directed by Jacques Mauclair (2 March)
- 1955 : L'Île de la providence by Hubert Gignoux, directed by René Lafforgue (October)
- 1955 : Pas d'amour by Ugo Betti, adaptation Maurice Clavel (November)
- 1956 : Marée basse by Jean Duvignaud, directed by Roger Blin (19 January)
- 1956 : L’Orgueil et la Nuée by Georges Soria, directed by Pierre Valde (March)
- 1956 : Les Amants puérils by Fernand Crommelynck, directed by Tania Balachova (13 March)
