= François Aman-Jean =

French writer and playwright

- Born: 14 September 1894; 4th arrondissement of Paris
- Died: 2 April 1986 (aged 91); Chateau-Thierry
- Occupations: Writer, playwright

François Aman-Jean, real name François Henri Amand Jean, (14 Septembre 1894 – 2 April 1986) was a French writer and playwright.

== Biography ==
The son of the painter Edmond Aman-Jean, on 4 December 1916 in Paris he married Charlotte Simon, the daughter of the painter Lucien Simon, herself a painter, known under the name Charlotte Aman-Jean.

A captain in the French army, Aman-Jean served in Romania in 1918

MD, surgeon by profession, he had a try at the Theater in 1949, but the creation of Jeanne la Folle by the Comédie-Française at the Théâtre de l'Odéon did not meet the expected success. However, he persevered with a one-act play at the Théâtre des Noctambules, four years later.

The sculptor Philippe Besnard made a bronze bust of him, displayed in 1913 at the Salon de la Société Nationale des Beaux-arts (SNBA).

== Novels ==
- 1963 : Annie de Berck et Marie de Montreuil, chronique, Paris, Buchet/Chastel
- 1965 : L'Ourson, Paris, Buchet-Chastel
- 1979 : L'Enfant oublié : chronique, 1894–1905, Buchet-Chastel, Paris.

== Theatre ==
- 1949 : Jeanne la Folle, directed by Jean Meyer, Comédie-Française at the Théâtre de l'Odéon, 27 October
- 1953 : Le Gardien des oiseaux, one-act play, directed by Sacha Pitoëff, Théâtre des Noctambules

== Television ==
- 1964 : Meneer Emile (Zaalwachter Vogels)
