= Nicolas Bataille =

French comedian and director

Nicolas Bataille (14 March 1926 – 28 October 2008) was a French actor and director.

== Biography ==
The son of a Parisian architect, Nicolas Bataille (born Roger Bataille) debuted as an actor during the Occupation of France while following the dramatic teachings of René Simon, Tania Balachova, and the comedian Solange Sicard.

Appearing in Children of Paradise by Marcel Carné, he obtained his first notable roles at the Liberation of France. In 1948, he staged A Season in Hell from the poem by Arthur Rimbaud, with Akakia-Viala and received a prize for avant-garde young theater companies. The next year, he forged with Akakia-Viala a fake text by Rimbaud: The Spiritual Hunt, which was published in the French resistance newspaper Combat (newspaper), on 19 May 1949 and subsequently in Mercure de France.

At the start of the 1950s, he received L'Anglais sans peine, the first unpublished work by a still unknown French author of Romanian origin, Eugène Ionesco. He directed this absurdist, which would be called The Bald Soprano, on 11 May 1950 at the Théâtre des Noctambules in the 5th arrondissement of Paris. His ability to do so was largely thanks to his friendship with Claude Autant-Lara's family, who also provided him the costumes for Occupe-toi d'Amélie!. The play was initially a public and critical failure, but he resumed it starting on 11 May 1957 at La Huchette, thanks to the growing success of its author and the financial support of Louis Malle. He remained the lifeblood of La Huchette until his death, more than half a century after introducing Eugène Ionesco to the public, and he performed the role of Monsieur Martin until June 2007, before a total of more than one million five hundred thousand spectators.

He continued his theatrical career at the same time. In 1964 he staged in La Philosophie dans le boudoir, based on the book by Sade, a play that was quickly banned but continued to be performed. In 1966, in collaboration with Jean-François Adam, he directed L'été by Romain Weingarten at the Théâtre de Poche Montparnasse and L'Elève de Brecht by Bernard Da Costa in 1984. He won the SACD Georges-Pitoëff prize for his production of Le Cirque by Claude Mauriac. He was also interested in musicals, staging Twist Appeal with Vince Taylor in 1962, the works of Filippo Tommaso Marinetti, then Offenbach, tu connais ? in the 1990s.

He was a renowned director, both in France and Japan, where he was awarded several prizes between 1969 and 1976. For a time, he was the actor of choice for Louis Malle, who directed him in three of his films, in which he portrayed a client of a night bar (Elevator to the Gallows), a Russian driver of a tourist bus (Zazie in the metro), and a theater director staging Kleist in an open-air theater (A Very Private Affair). In addition, he played a protagonist of Jean Dréville's film Normandie-Niémen and one of the manual laborers in Jacques Tati's Mon Oncle.
