= Philippe Besnard =

French sculptor

- Born: 18 November 1885; 17th arrondissement of Paris, France
- Died: 2 November 1971 (aged 85); 15th arrondissement of Paris
- Resting place: Père Lachaise Cemetery
- Occupation: Sculptor
- Parent(s): Paul-Albert Besnard; Charlotte Dubray

Philippe Besnard (18 November 1885 – 2 November 1971) was a French sculptor. He was buried at the Père Lachaise Cemetery.
