= Un chant d'amour =

- 2003 Region 2 DVD (BFI)
- Directed by: Jean Genet
- Written by: Jean Genet
- Produced by: Nico Papatakis
- Starring: Java; André Reybaz
- Cinematography: Jacques Natteau
- Edited by: Jean Genet
- Music by: Gavin Bryars (1973); Patrick Nunn (1996); Simon Fisher-Turner (2003)
- Distributed by: Connoisseur Video
- Release date: 1954 (Cinémathèque Française)
- Running time: 26 minutes
- Country: France
- Language: No dialogue

Un chant d'amour (French pronunciation: [œ̃ ʃɑ̃ damuʁ]; English: A Song of Love) is French writer Jean Genet's only film, which he directed in 1950. Because of its explicit (though artistically presented) homosexual content, the 26-minute movie was long banned. The film first screened publicly in 1954 with the sexually explicit scenes expurgated.

== Plot ==
The film begins with a hand extended from prison bars, swinging a bouquet of flowers towards, but never reaching another hand extended from adjacent prison bars. The plot is set in a French prison, where a prison guard takes voyeuristic pleasure in observing the prisoners perform masturbatory sexual acts. In two adjacent cells, there is an older Algerian-looking man and a tattooed convict in his twenties. The older man is in love with the younger one, rubbing himself against the wall and sharing his cigarette smoke with his beloved through a straw.

The prison guard, apparently jealous of the prisoners' relationship, enters the older convict's cell and beats him. Following this, the inmate drifts off into a fantasy where he and his object of desire roam the countryside. In the final scene, it becomes clear that the guard's power is no match for the intensity of attraction between the prisoners, even though their relationship is not consummated. The prison guard makes the older prisoner suck on his gun in a sexual fashion. The guard therefore becomes a distorted reflection of the prisoners' love for each other. The film ends with the other hand grasping the flowers and taking the flowers behind his own bars.

Genet does not use dialogue in his film, but focuses instead on close-ups of bodies, on faces, armpits and penises. The film is also rich in symbolism, and the entire narrative may be read as symbolic of the desire for consummation of love between two persons, realised in part through the voyeuristic and sadistic intervention of a third.

== Cast ==
- Bravo as older prisoner (uncredited)
- Lucien Sénémaud as younger prisoner (uncredited)
- Java as nude prisoner (uncredited)
- André Reybaz as Guard (uncredited)
- Coco Le Martiniquais as second dancing prisoner (uncredited)

== Production ==
Un chant d'amour was French writer Jean Genet's only film, which he directed. Jean Cocteau was believed to be the film's cinematographer.

== Controversy and ban ==
When in 1966 distributor Sol Landau attempted to exhibit the film in Berkeley, California, he was informed by a member of the local police special investigations department that were he to continue screening it the film "would be confiscated and the person responsible arrested." Landau responded by instituting the case of Landau v. Fording (1966) in which he sought to show Genet's work without police harassment. The Alameda County Superior Court watched the film twice and declared that it,"explicitly and vividly revealed acts of masturbation, oral copulation, the infamous crime against nature [a euphemism for sodomy], voyeurism, nudity, sadism, masochism and sex..." The court rejected Landau's suit, further condemning the film as "cheap pornography calculated to promote homosexuality, perversion and morbid sex practices." He was similarly rebuffed in the District Court of Appeal of California, which accepted that Genet was a major writer but cited this as a lesser work of an early period and declared that in the end it was "nothing more than hard-core pornography and should be banned." When the case reached the U.S. Supreme Court, the decision was confirmed once more, in a 5-4 per curiam decision in which the justices simply stated that Un chant d'amour was obscene and offered no further explanation.

— Jonathon Green and Nicholas J Karolides, The Encyclopedia of Censorship

== Critical reception ==
Un chant d'amour was described in The Queer Encyclopedia of Film & Television as "one of the earliest and most remarkable attempts to portray homosexual passion on-screen". Fernando F. Croce of Slant wrote "A revolutionary vision of emancipation through sensuality, Un chant d'amour is a song of love both universal and eternal." Jamie Rich of DVD Talk called it "an effective film, albeit a tad clumsy and pretentious" that is "still a progressive and interesting experiment worth the time one is willing to put into it." Phil Hall of Film Threat was more critical, writing "working in a silent film medium robs Genet of the lyrical language that dominated his artistic genius, and instead he presents a skein of imagery that becomes sillier and sillier as the film progresses. [...] Strictly of curio value, "Un chant d'amour" can offer contemporary viewers little more than some unintentional gay giggles."

On Rotten Tomatoes the film has an approval rating of 100% based on reviews from 8 critics.

== Legacy ==
The film has been cited as an influence for many gay filmmakers, including Derek Jarman, Andy Warhol, and Paul Morrissey.

== See also ==
- List of avant-garde films of the 1950s
