= Charlotte Dubray =

French sculptor

Charlotte Besnard
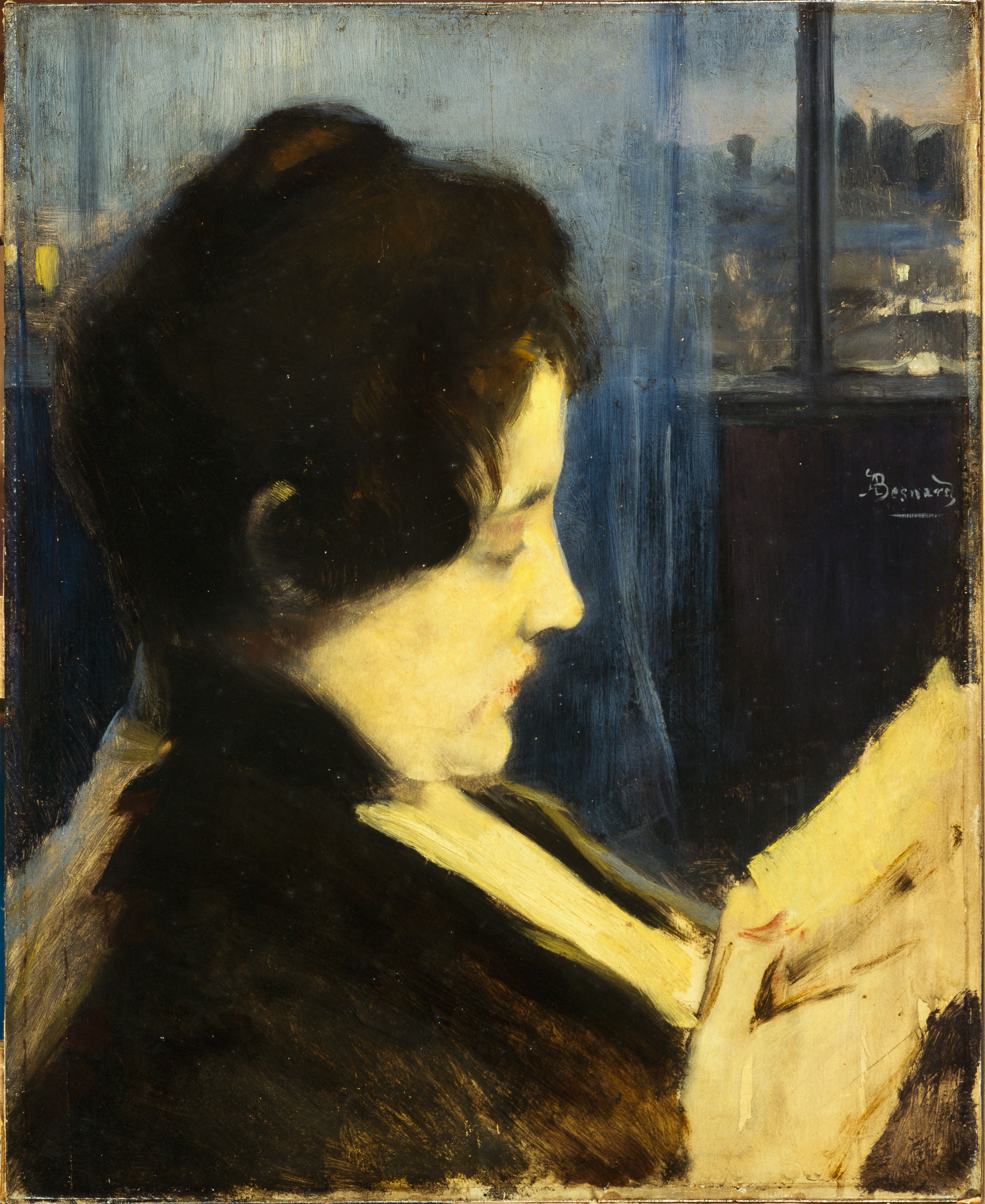
- Charlotte Besnard in 1903 by her husband, Paul-Albert Besnard
- Born: Charlotte Gabrielle Dubray; 25 April 1854; Paris, France
- Died: 15 May 1931 (aged 77); Paris, France
- Occupation: Sculptor

Charlotte Besnard (25 April 1854 – 15 March 1931), born Charlotte Dubray, was a French sculptor. She is perhaps best known as the wife of the successful painter Paul-Albert Besnard (1849–1934), whose career she did much to advance. Although she was well known for her own work in her day, she has since been largely forgotten.

== Life ==
Charlotte-Gabrielle Dubray was born in Paris on 25 April 1854. Her parents were Vital Gabriel Dubray (1818–1892), a sculptor, and Jeanne Aglaë Cecconi (1820–1896). Her father had a successful career under the Second French Empire (1851–70), executed many commissions and became a member of the Legion of Honour. Vital Dubray taught sculpture to two of his daughters, Charlotte and Giovanna. (Note: Charlotte's younger sister Eugénie Giovanna Dubray exhibited at the salons of 1875 and 1876. Another sister, Séverine, became a painter.) At this time sculpture was considered a less noble art than painting, a rough and dirty trade akin to artisan stonecutting, that generally required a public or private sponsor to cover the cost. Women sculptors were rare and had to have strong and determined characters.

Charlotte studied sculpture under Mlle Fanny Dubois-Davesnes. (Note: The sculptor Marguerite-Fanny Dubois-Davesnes (1832–1900) was the daughter of the playwright Charles-Hippolyte Dubois-Davesnes.) She was not able to attend the École des Beaux-Arts, which was reserved for men until 1897. She first exhibited at the Paris Salon in 1869. She managed to spend time studying art in Rome thanks to her sponsors and patrons the Duke and Duchess of Sutherland. She met her future husband in Rome. Her La Fille de Jephté pleurant sur la montagne (The daughter of Jephthah crying on the mountain), exhibited at the 1876 Salon, was created in Rome.

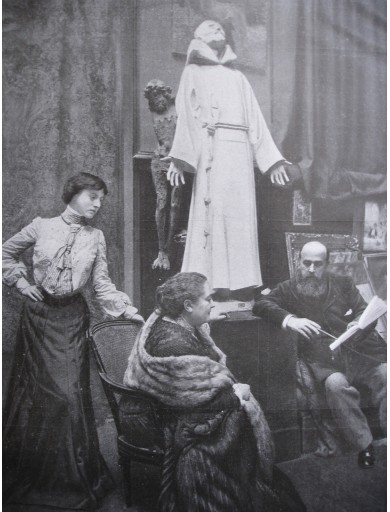
Germaine, Charlotte and Albert Besnard in the studio, statue of Saint Francis in the rear (1904)

On 19 November 1879 Charlotte Dubray married the painter Paul-Albert Besnard (1849–1934). She was his second wife. The young couple made their first home in London, where Charlotte had introductions to the English aristocracy and gained some success. Albert Besnard was disconcerted when he was addressed as "Mr. Dubray". However, Charlotte obtained commissions for him to make large portraits of notable English people. They had four children: Robert (1881–1914) painter; Germaine (1884–1975) sculptor and painter; Philippe (1885–1971) sculptor; and Jean (1889–1958) ceramic artist. Charlotte gave sculpture lessons to her son Philippe Besnard, who then went to Rome and studied under Henri Bouchard (1875–1960). Auguste Rodin (1840–1917) gave advice to both Charlotte and her son Philippe.

Charlotte did much to support and encourage her husband in his career, often acting as his secretary in handling correspondence on his behalf, arranging social engagements and dealing with exhibitions and potential purchasers. Charlotte took advantage of her husband's exhibitions in France and abroad to display her own work. Between 1869 and 1912 she exhibited at 37 Salons in 44 years, despite the demands of maternity and travel. Charlotte participated in the first exhibitions of the Union des femmes peintres et sculpteurs (Union of Women Painters and Sculptors), which the sculptor Hélène Bertaux (1825–1909) founded in 1881. This Salon was not successful, since it lacked a selection jury. However the union did succeed in 1897 in its vigorous campaign to allow women to enter the École des Beaux-Arts.

Charlotte became interested in the teaching of art, and achieved a reform in the way that drawing was taught, abandoning the "geometric method" in favour of freer and more spontaneous processes. In 1908 Charlotte organized an exhibition of women painters in Paris in the salons of the Lyceum. Following a journey to India, she wrote in Femina in 1911 about the condition of women in Egypt and India. From 1913 to 1921 her husband was Director of the French Academy in Rome, and Charlotte acted as a mother or chaperone to the girls at the Villa Medici. Charlotte Besnard died in Paris on 15 March 1931, aged 76.

== Work ==
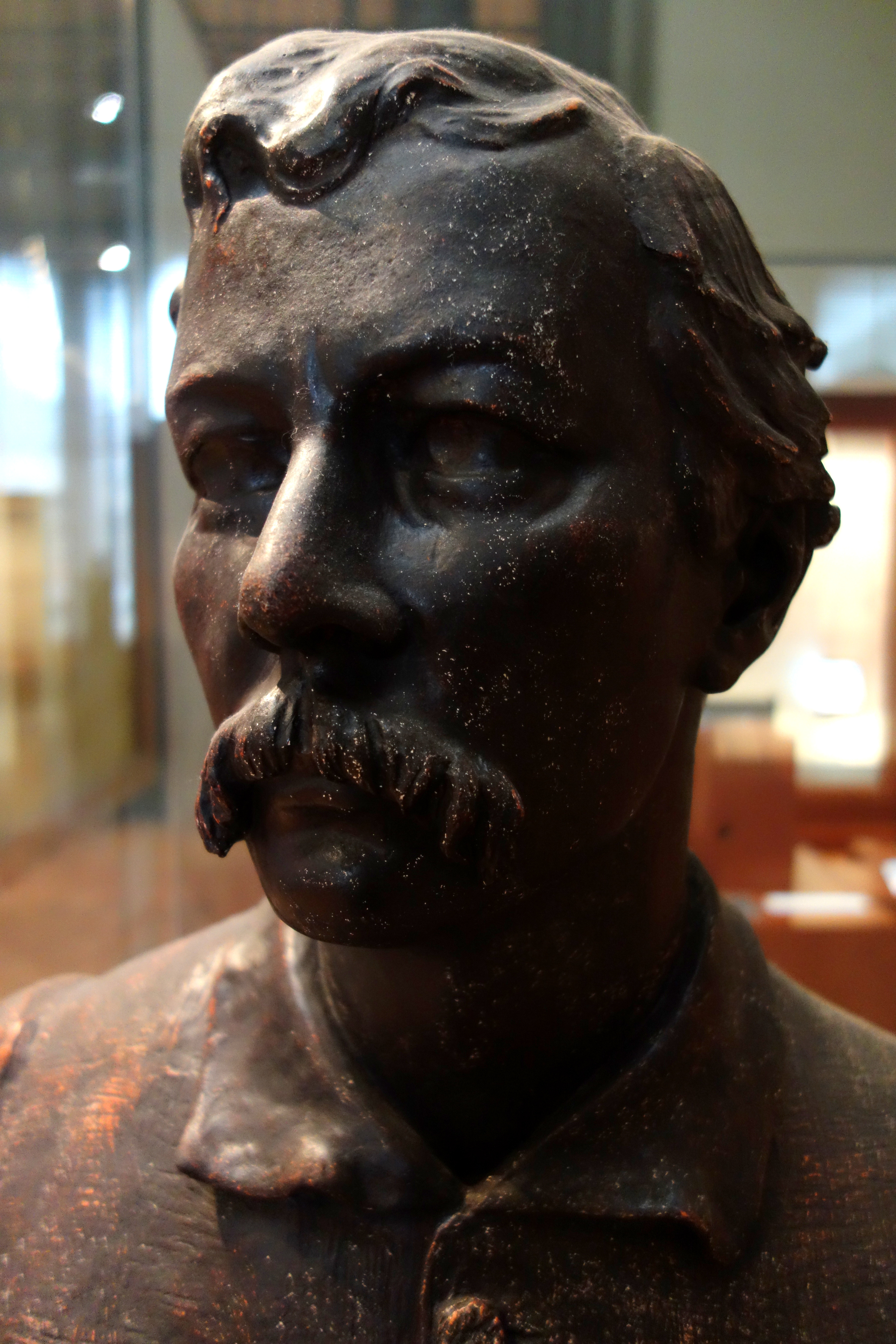
Henry Morton Stanley, plaster, presented by the Duke of Sutherland to the Royal Geographical Society

Dubray's early exhibits at the Salon included:

- 1869 Giovannina, terracotta bust of her younger sister
- 1873 Général Renault, marble bust for the Versaille museum
- 1874 Jeune fellah du Caire, marble bust
- 1875 Tête d'étude (Florence, XVIe siècle, silvered bronze bust in the Italian Renaissance style inspired by a trip to Tuscany
- 1876 Napolitain, bronze bust
- 1876 La Fille de Jephté pleurant sur la montagne plaster statue

Charlotte exhibited a large statue of Judith présentant la tête d’Holopherne aux habitants de Béthulie (Judith presenting the head of Holofernes to the inhabitants of Bethulia) at the 1880 Salon. This marked the end of her adherence to academic conventions. Her work evolved throughout her career, and showed her desire to stay in touch with current trends. While her children were growing up she often used them for models, intimate works that were possible due to her financial security. For example, she presented a statuette of her baby Robert to the Salon of 1883. Most of the portraits, busts and masks of this period remained in the family and have been scattered and often forgotten.

In the 1890s Charlotte began to experiment with ceramics with the help of partners such as Auguste Delaherche (1857–1940) and Albert Dammouse (1848–1926). A high relief of Cérès was exhibited at the Objets d’Art section of the Salon of the Société Nationale des Beaux-Arts in 1892. She made an imposing statue of Saint Francis that won a silver medal at the Exposition Universelle de 1900. An article on the Besnard couple by Frantz Jourdain appeared in La Vie heureuse in 1904, with photographs showing this statue.

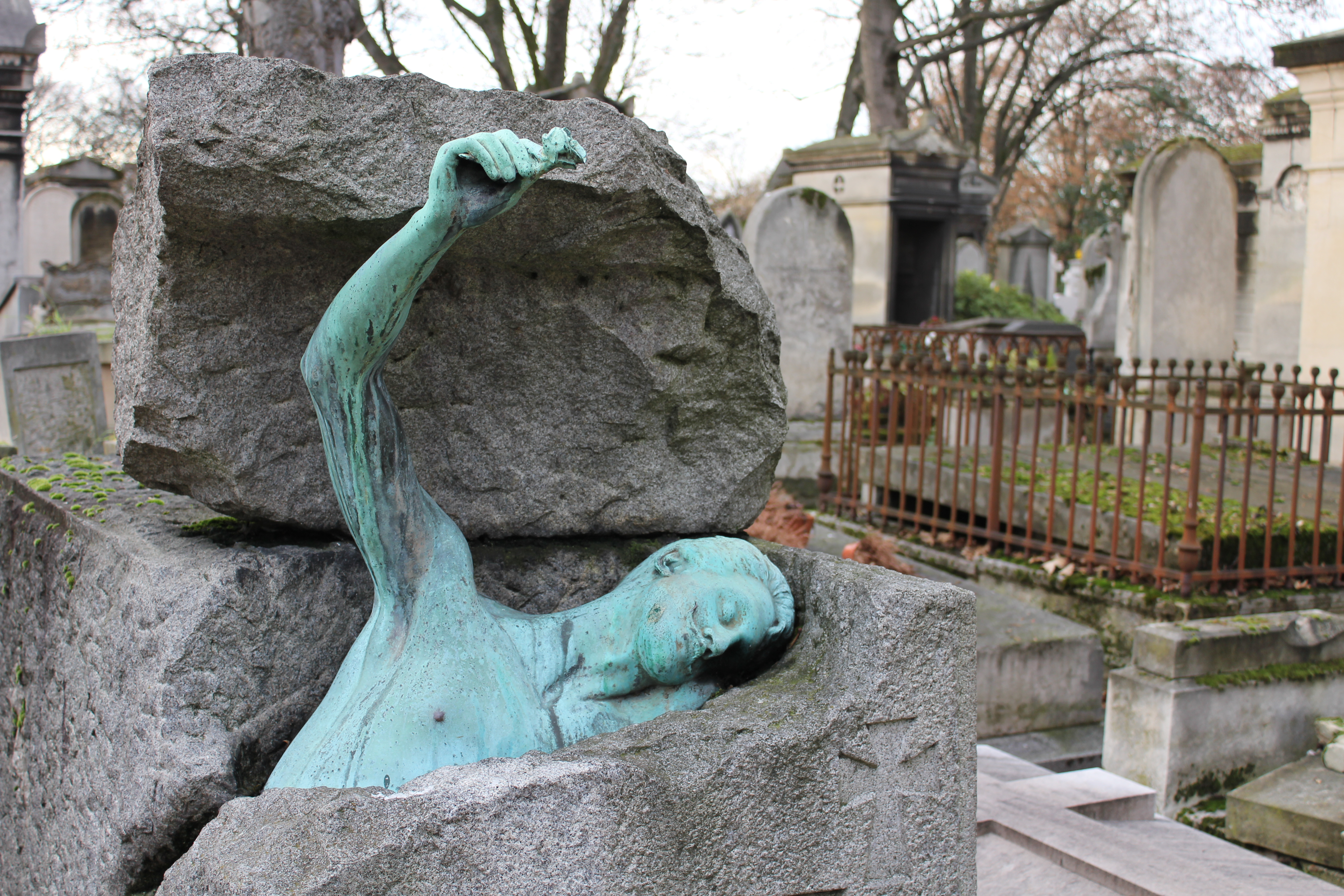
Grave of Georges Rodenbach

Charlotte Besnard designed an unusual portrait for the tomb in Père Lachaise Cemetery of the Belgian poet Georges Rodenbach (1855–98). His bronze upper body, grasping a rose, emerges from (or subsides into) the rock that covers his grave. In the 1900s she began to experiment with combinations of terracotta, paste, wax, plaster and paint on statuettes of women, symbolic rather than realistic.

== Reception ==
A June 1877 review of the Royal Academy Exhibition said "Miss Charlotte Dubray shows much decision of handling in a terra-cotta portraiture of 'Professor Birkbeck' ... and equal grace and fancy in 'La Coquette'." She had to contest with male prejudices. Henri Jouin, writing of the Salon of 1873, said her bust of Général Renault was "the best of the busts executed by a woman's hand." The art critic Camille Mauclair (1872–1945) followed a complimentary description of Besnard by saying she was "very feminine with an almost masculine brain".

Charlotte Besnard was very active during her life, exhibited regularly and sometimes won awards. She was often mentioned in artistic circles, and was the subject or author of articles in the press. However, many of her works were somewhat conventional. Few of them were acquired by the great public collections, and she has been largely forgotten. When she is remembered it is mostly as the wife of a painter who was famous in his day, and who has recently come back into vogue.

== Publications ==
- Pour bien s'initier aux beaux-arts, Femina-bibliothèque, preface by Mme Charlotte Besnard..., Paris: P. Lafitte, 1912, p. 352

== Sources ==
- "Albert BESNARD (1849–1934)", Drouot Catalogue (in French), archived from the original on 2017-12-01
- Bitard, Adolphe (1878), Dictionnaire général de biographie contemporaine française et étrangère, contenant les noms et pseudonymes de tous les personnages célèbres du temps présent... (in French), M. Dreyfous
- Charlotte-Gabrielle Besnard (1854–1930) (in French), BnF: Bibliotheque nationale de France
- Garric, Alain, "Charlotte DUBRAY", geneanet (in French)
- Moreau-Sionneau, Hélène (2013), Catherine Méneux; Emmanuel Pernoud; Pierre Wat (eds.), "Charlotte Besnard (1854–1931) : être femme sculpteur et épouse d'artiste en vogue, au tournant du XXe siècle." (PDF), Actes de la Journée d'études Actualité de la recherche en XIXe siècle, Master 1, Années 2012 et 2013 (in French), Paris – via HiCSA
- "Royal Academy Exhibition", The Illustrated London News, Elm House, 23 June 1877
- "Sculpteurs et Graveurs en Medailles", Gazette des Beaux-Arts (in French), J. Claye, 1870
- Tobin, Beth Fowkes (2017-07-05), Women and the Material Culture of Death, Taylor & Francis, ISBN 978-1-351-53680-6
