= The Bald Soprano =

1950 absurdist play by Eugène Ionesco

- Original language: French
- Written by: Eugène Ionesco
- Characters: Mr. Smith; Mrs. Smith; Mr. Martin; Mrs. Martin; Mary, the maid; The Fire Chief
- Genre: Theatre of the Absurd
- Setting: A middle-class English home. An English evening.

Premiere
- Date: 11 May 1950
- Place: Théâtre des Noctambules; Paris, France

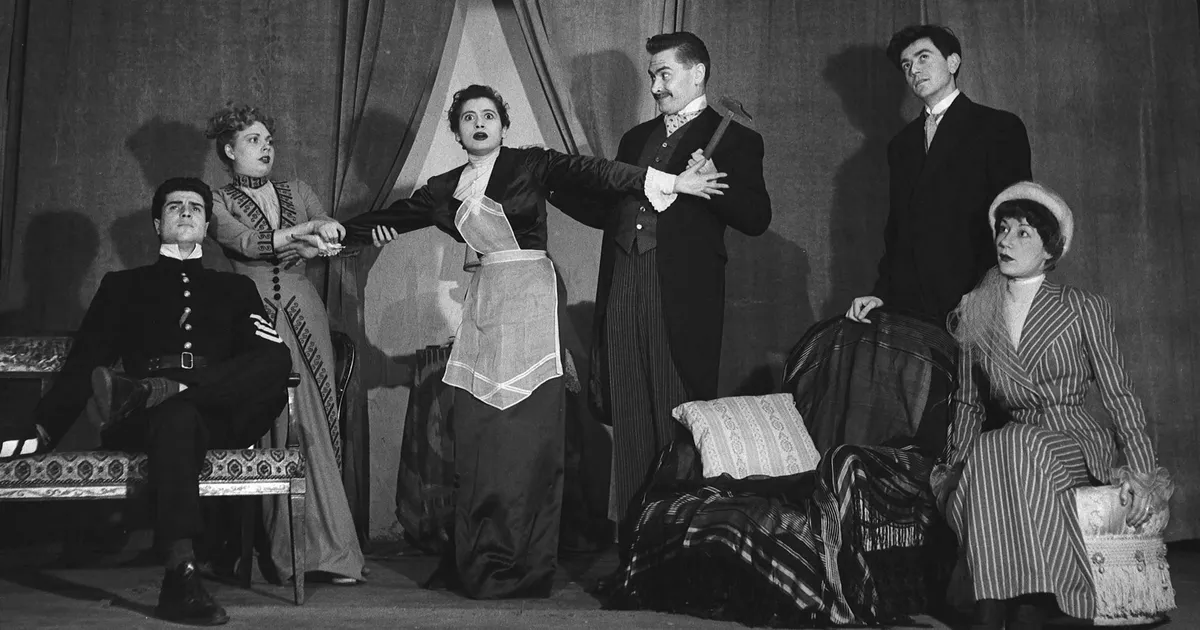
A first-ever performance of the play at the Théâtre des Noctambules, 1950

La Cantatrice chauve – translated from French as The Bald Soprano or The Bald Prima Donna – is the first play written by Romanian-French playwright Eugène Ionesco.

Nicolas Bataille directed the premiere on 11 May 1950 at the Théâtre des Noctambules, Paris. Since 1957, it has been in permanent showing at the Théâtre de la Huchette, which received a Molière d'honneur for its performances. It holds the world record for the play that has been staged continuously in the same theatre for the longest time. Although it went unnoticed at first, the play was eventually championed by a few established writers and critics and, in the end, won critical acclaim. By the 1960s, The Bald Soprano had already been recognized as a modern classic and an important seminal work in the Theatre of the Absurd. With a record number of interpretations, it has become one of the most performed plays in France.

== Origin ==
The idea for the play came to Ionesco while he was trying to learn English with the Assimil method. Impressed by the contents of the dialogues, often very sober and strange, he decided to write an absurd play named L'anglais sans peine ("English without toil"). Other possible titles which were considered included Il pleut des chiens et des chats, ("It's raining cats and dogs", translated in French literally); "L'heure anglaise" and "Big Ben Follies".

Its actual title was the result of an error in rehearsal by actor Henri-Jacques Huet: the fire chief's monologue initially included a mention of "l'institutrice blonde" ("the blonde schoolteacher"), but Huet said "la cantatrice chauve", and Ionesco, who was present, decided to re-use the phrase.

== Overview ==
The Smiths are a traditional couple from London who have invited another couple, the Martins, over for a visit. They are joined later by the Smiths' maid, Mary, and the local fire chief, who is also Mary's lover. The two families engage in meaningless banter, telling stories and relating nonsensical poems. At one point, Mrs. Martin converses with her husband as if he were a stranger she just met. As the fire chief turns to leave, he mentions "the bald soprano" in passing, which has a very unsettling effect on the others. Mrs. Smith replies that "she always styles her hair the same way." After the Fire Chief's exit, the play devolves into a series of complete non-sequiturs with no resemblance to normal conversation. It ends with the two couples shouting in unison "It's not that way. It's over here!" ("C’est pas par là, c’est par ici!" ) right before a blackout occurs. When the lights come back on, the scene starts from the beginning with the Martins reciting the Smiths' lines from the beginning of the play for a while before the curtain closes.

== Story ==
- Scene 1

The play opens on Mrs. Smith reciting the events of the night with Mr. Smith. They discuss the death of someone they knew, Bobby Watson. The play then shifts back to reality and they realize that Bobby has been dead for four years. Suddenly they flash back to when he was alive and engaged to a woman who was also called Bobby Watson. Then they shift back to reality where they realize that he has left behind two children and they are gossiping about whom his wife will remarry. Allegedly she is going to name another relative by the same name, but, given that they all have the same name and work in the same industry, the Smiths have a difficult time figuring out who is who.

- Scene 2

Their maid, Mary enters, announcing that the Martins have arrived. The Smiths leave.

- Scene 3

The Martins enter, and Mary chides them for being late; then she exits.

- Scene 4

After entering the room, the Martins realize that they have met each other before. They are surprised to find that they are both from the city of Manchester, that they both took the same train to London, that they both traveled second class, that they both reside at No. 19 Bromfield Street, that they sleep in the same bed, and that they both have a two-year-old daughter named Alice with one red eye and one white eye. They come to the conclusion that they are husband and wife. They recognize each other and embrace.

- Scene 5

Mary is on stage with the Martins, who are asleep. She tells the audience that the two are mistaken, that they are not husband and wife, but that, never mind, things should be left just as they are.

- Scene 6

The Martins, alone, agree that now that they've found each other, they should just live as they had before.

- Scene 7

When the Smiths return they talk about and with their guests. The doorbell rings and Mr. Smith goes to open the door.

- Scene 8

The Fire Chief enters. He's disappointed to find no fire at the Smiths', but they promise that they'll call him if one occurs. While they wait for something to happen they tell stories, none of which make sense.

- Scene 9

Mary enters and tells her own story, in which she reveals that she is the lover of the Fire Chief. The Smiths then push her out of the room.

- Scene 10

The Fire Chief leaves. Before departing, he mentions the bald soprano.

- Scene 11

The Martins and the Smiths recite nonsensical truisms. Then all sense of language dissipates as the two couples quarrel, but no one is able to communicate and none of their issues are resolved. As they argue the lights fade; when they rise again, the Martins are in the Smiths' living room, repeating the same lines with which the Smiths opened the play.

== Meaning ==
Like many plays in the theatre of the absurd genre, the underlying theme of The Bald Soprano is not immediately apparent. Many suggest that it expresses the futility of meaningful communication in modern society. The script is charged with non sequiturs that give the impression that the characters are not even listening to each other in their frantic efforts to make their own voices heard. There was speculation that it was parody around the time of its first performance, but Ionesco states in an essay written to his critics that he had no intention of parody, but if he were parodying anything, it would be everything.

The Bald Soprano appears to have been written as a continuous loop. The final scene contains stage instructions to start the performance over from the very beginning, with the Martin couple substituted for the Smith couple and vice versa. However, this decision was only added in after the show's hundredth performance, and it was originally the Smiths who restarted the show, in exactly the same manner as before.

According to Ionesco, he had several possible endings in mind, including a climax in which the "author" or "manager" antagonizes the audience, and even a version in which the audience is shot with machine guns. However, he ultimately settled for a cheaper solution, the cycle. Ionesco told Claude Bonnefoy in an interview, "I wanted to give a meaning to the play by having it begin all over again with two characters. In this way the end becomes a new beginning but, since there are two couples in the play, it begins the first time with the Smiths and the second time with the Martins, to suggest the interchangeable nature of the characters: the Smiths are the Martins and the Martins are the Smiths".

== See also ==
- Le Monde's 100 Books of the Century
- Long-running plays
- EText in English| available from Paolo Landi
