= Paul-Albert Besnard =

French painter

Paul-Albert Besnard (French: [pɔl albɛʁ bɛnaʁ]; 2 June 1849 – 4 December 1934) was a French painter and printmaker.

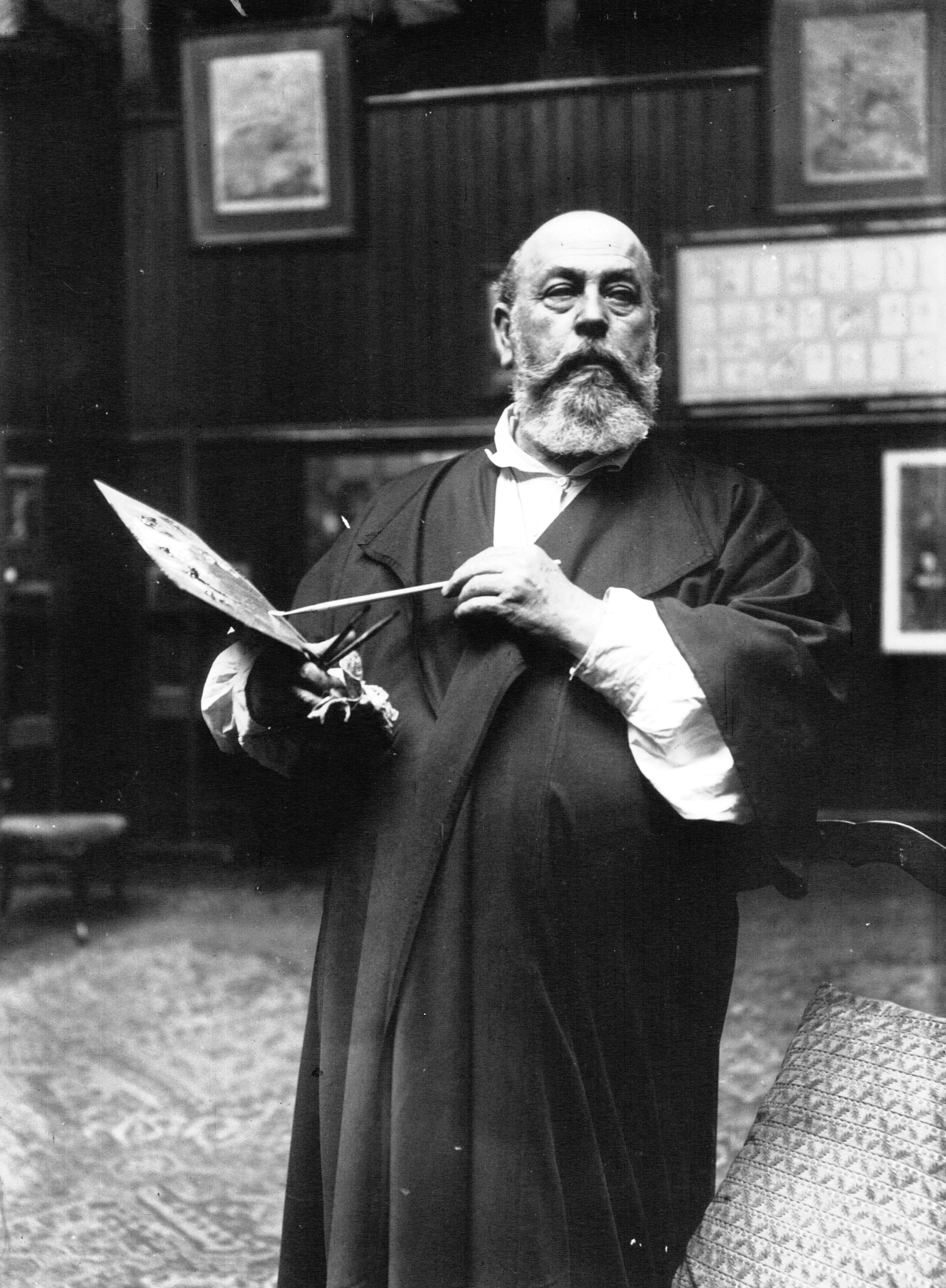
Albert Besnard (1913), photograph by Agence de presse Meurisse. Paris, Bibliothèque nationale de France.

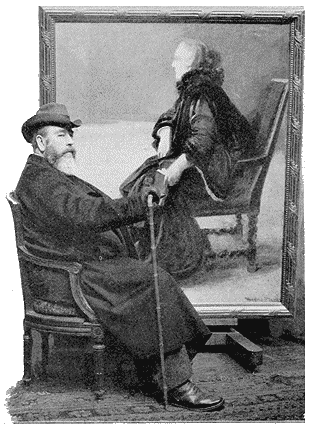
Albert Besnard in front of a portrait of his wife (1905)

== Biography ==
Besnard was born in Paris and studied at the École des Beaux-Arts, studied with Jean Bremond and was influenced by Alexandre Cabanel. He won the Prix de Rome in 1874 with the painting Death of Timophanes.

On 19 November 1879 he married the sculptor Charlotte Dubray (1854–1931). They had four children, of whom three were artists.

Until about 1880 he followed the academic tradition, but then broke away completely, and devoted himself to the study of colour and light as conceived by the Impressionists. The realism of this group never appealed to his bold imagination, but he applied their technical method to ideological and decorative works on a large scale, such as his frescoes at the Sorbonne, the Ecole de Pharmacie, the ceiling of the Comédie-Française (main theatre in Paris), the Salle des Sciences at the Hôtel de Ville, the mairie of the 1st arrondissement, and the chapel of Berck hospital, for which he painted twelve Stations of the Cross in an entirely modern spirit.

A great virtuoso, he achieved brilliant successes alike in watercolour, pastel, oil and etching, both in portraiture, in landscape and in decoration. His close analysis of light can be studied in his picture La femme qui se chauffe at the Luxembourg in Paris, one of a large group of nude studies of which a later example is Une Nymphe au bord de la mer; and in the work produced during and after a visit to India in 1911. A large panel, Peace by Arbitration, was completed seven days before the outbreak of war in 1914.

Partly under the influence of Thomas Gainsborough and Joshua Reynolds, whom he studied during a three-years stay in England, he applied his methods to a brilliant series of portraits, especially of women. Notable among these are the Portrait de Théâtre (Madame Réjane), and Mme. Roger Jourdain. The former is a good example of his daring unconventionality. A later work is The King and Queen of Belgium (1919). His landscape work is represented by L'ile heureuse, and Un Ruisseau dans la Montagne (1920). A symbolist in his decorative work, Besnard's frank delight in the external world and his “chic” luminous technique bring him close to the 18th-century French painters.

A foundation member of the Société Nationale des Beaux-Arts in 1890, in 1913 he became a member of the Institute. He succeeded Carolus Duran as director of the Académie française in Rome. In 1912, he became a member of the French Académie des Beaux-Arts and became director of the École des Beaux Arts in 1922. In 1923 he co-founded the Salon des Tuileries.

He was represented in the official exhibition of French art held in the United States in 1919-20 by a symbolic 1917 portrait of Cardinal Mercier. An important exhibition of his works was shown in different cities of the United States in 1924.

== Honours ==
- 1907 : Member of the Royal Academy of Science, Letters and Fine Arts of Belgium.
- commander of the Legion of Honour
- Member of the Société Nationale des Beaux-Arts
- 1924 : member of the Académie française (Seat #13).
- 1932: Honorary Corresponding member of the National Academy of Design.

== Gallery ==
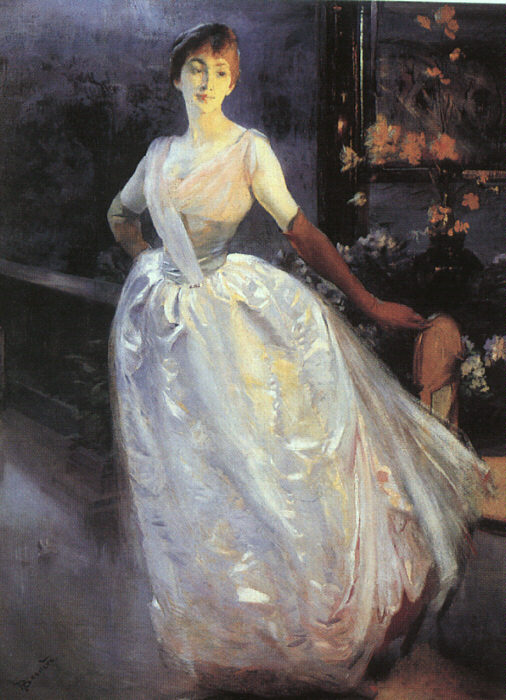
Portrait of Madame Roger Jourdain (Henriette Jourdain), oil on canvas, 1886

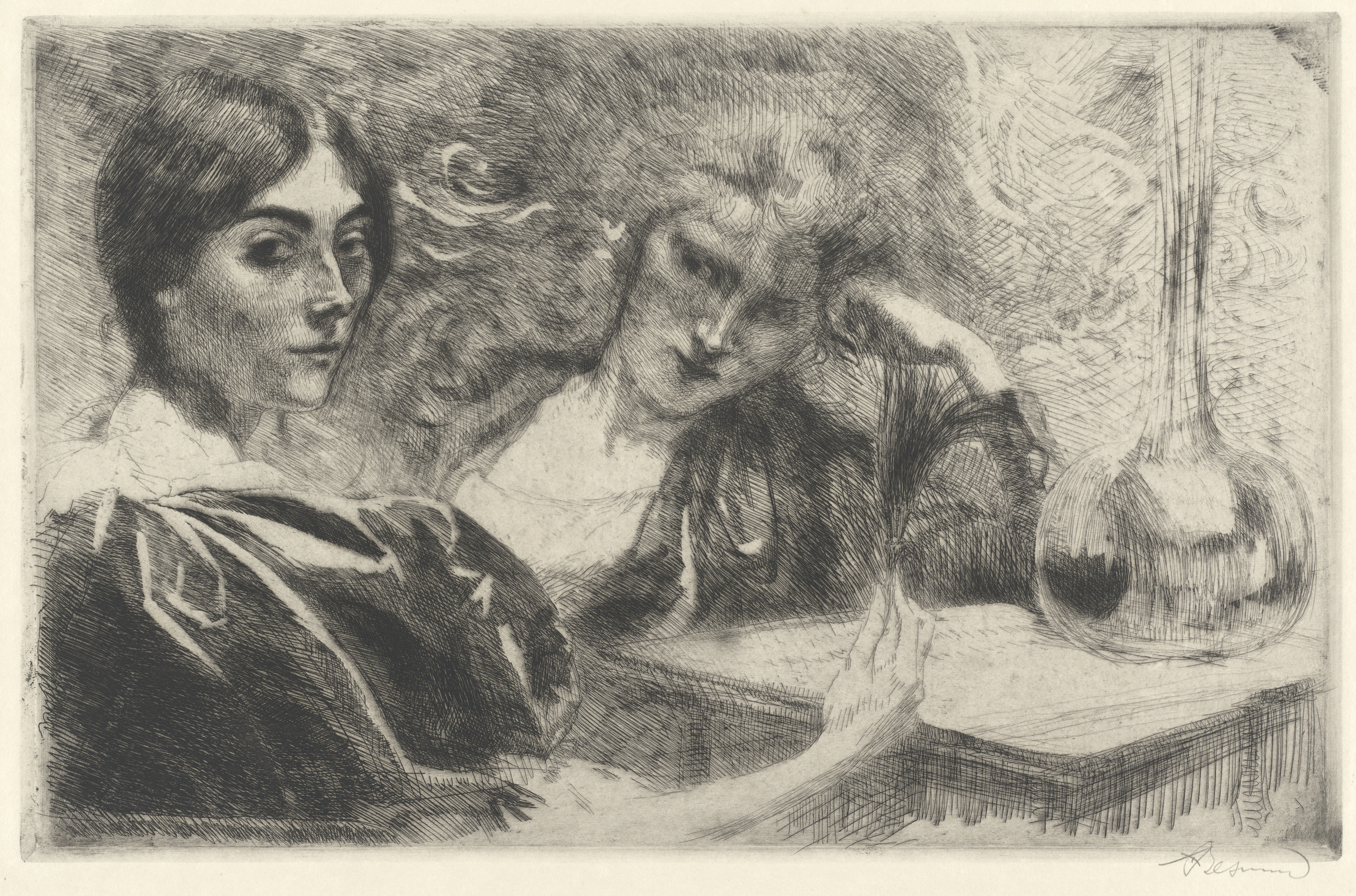
Morphine Addicts (Morphinomanes), etching, 1887

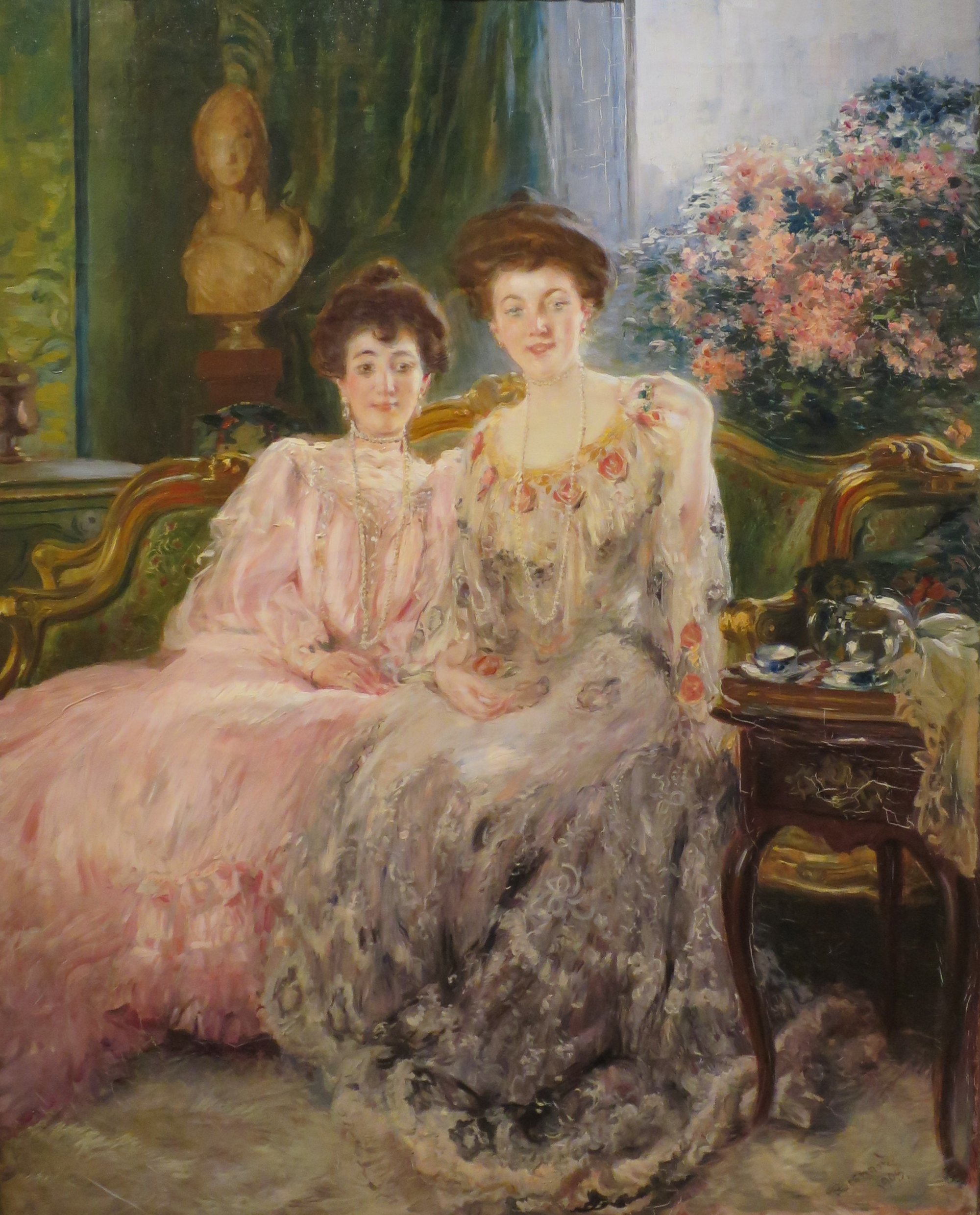
Portrait of the Kharitonenko Sisters, oil on canvas, 1903, at the Pushkin Museum

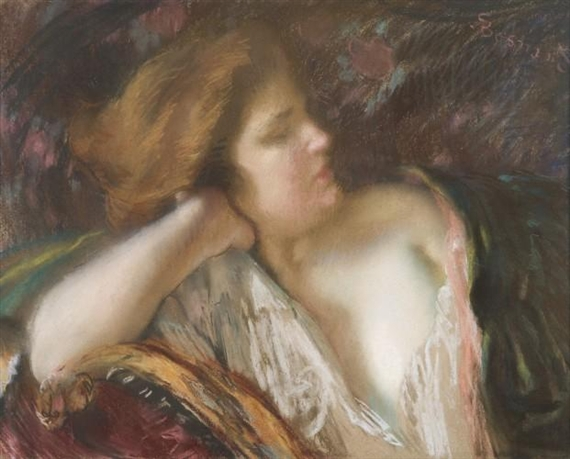
Femme pensive dans un sofa, pastel, 1890

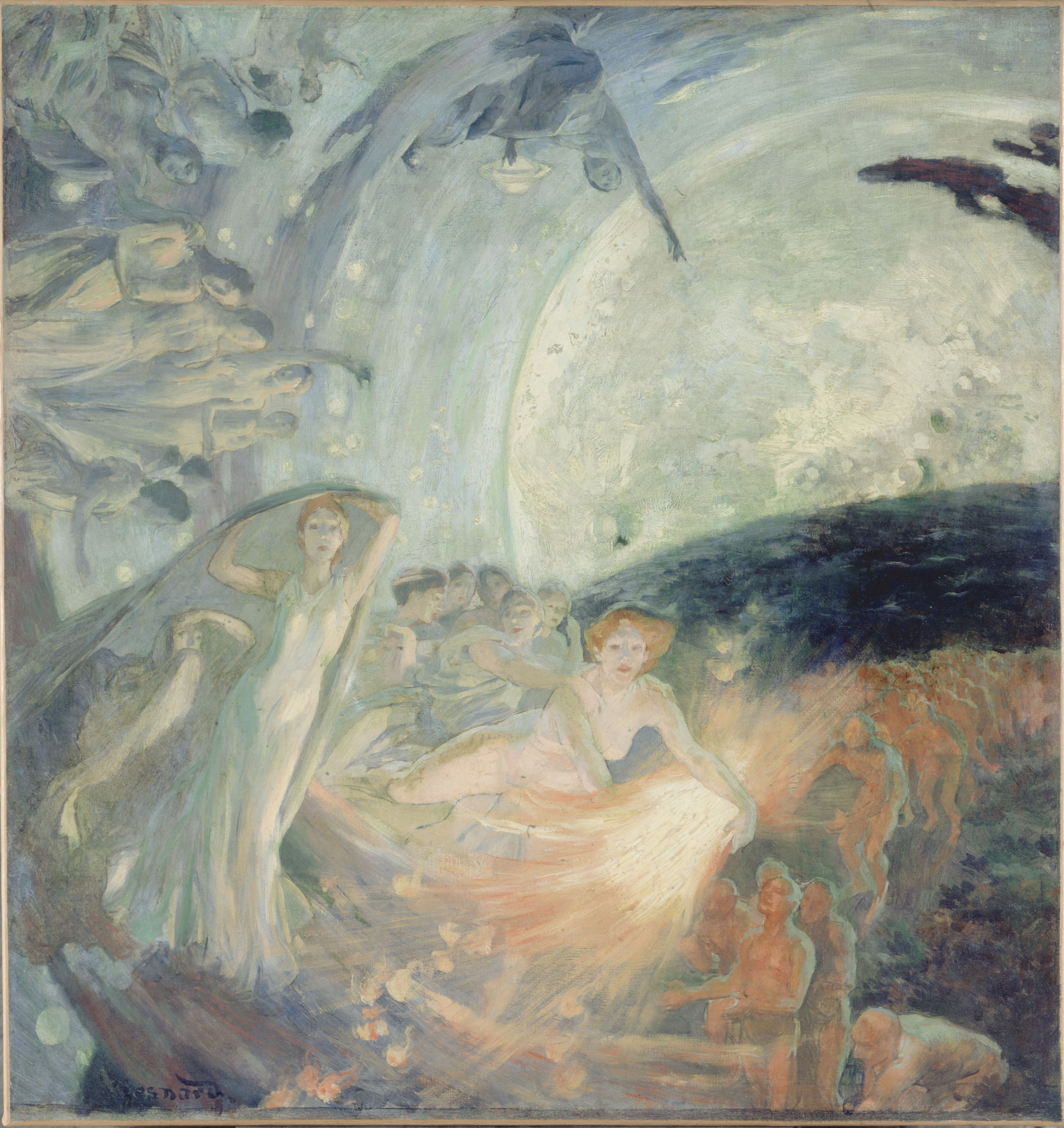
The Truth leading the Sciences in its wake spreads its light

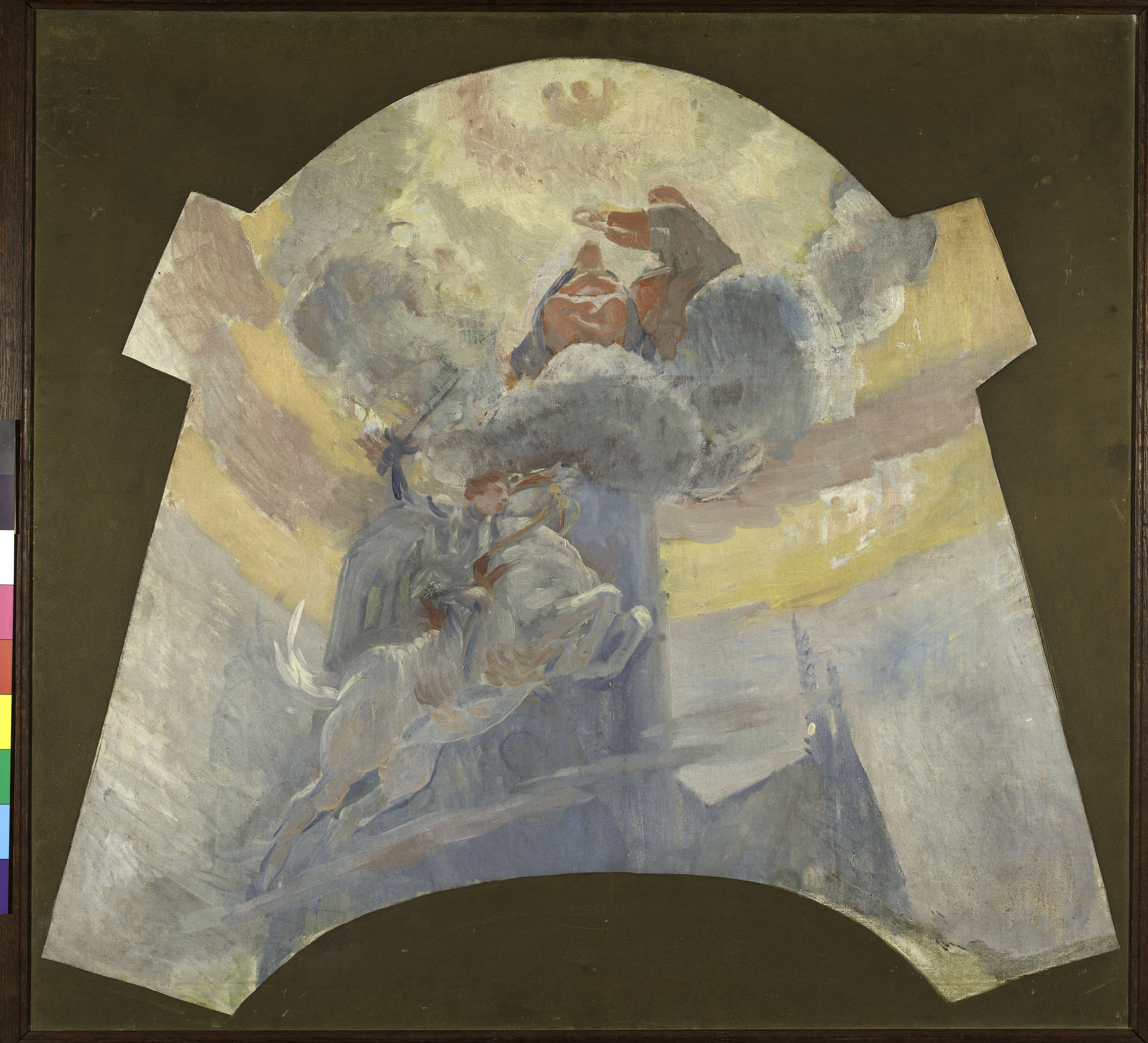
The Mystique (1908), depicting the Coronation of the Virgin

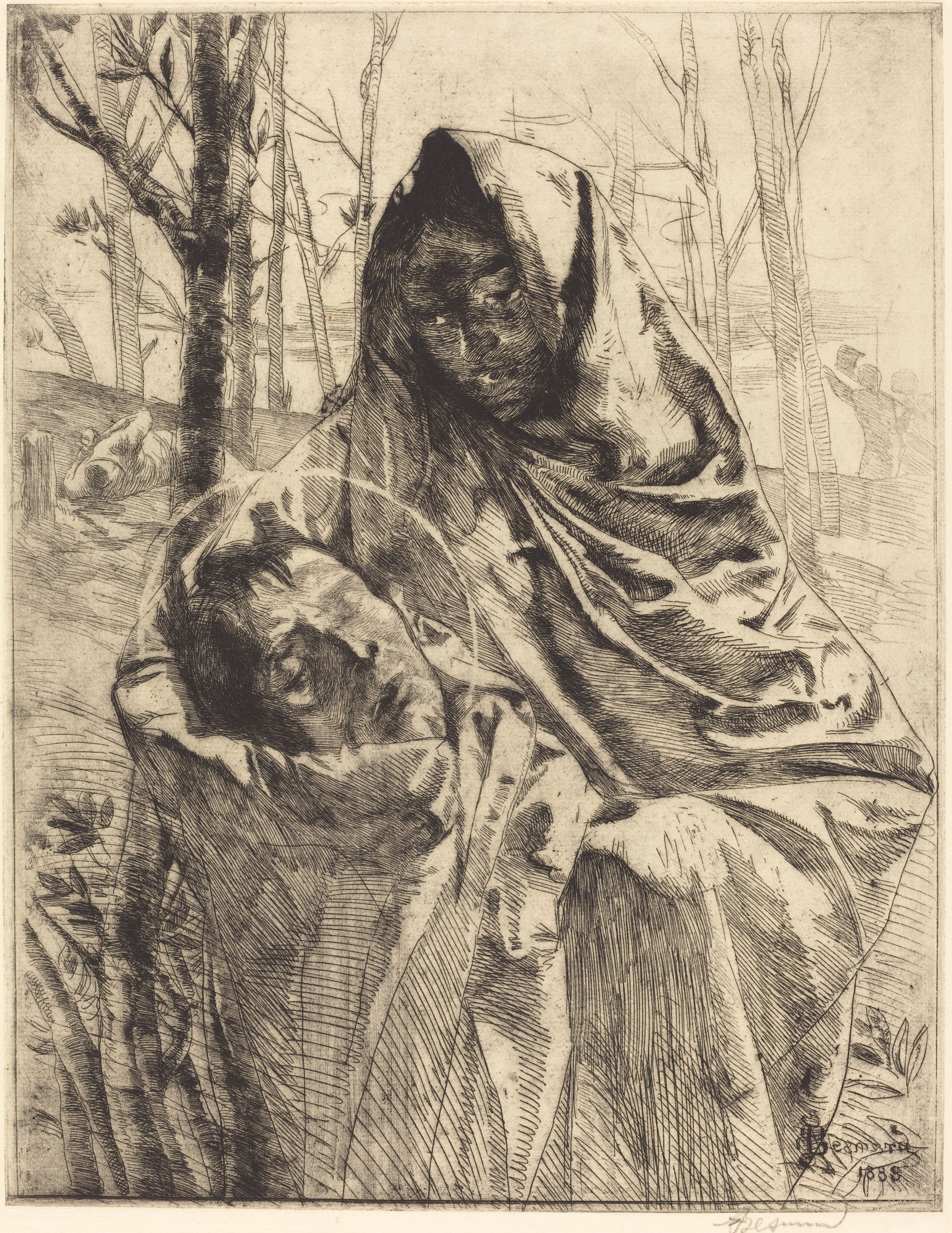
A Martyr
