= André Reybaz =

French actor (1922–1989)

André Reybaz (29 October 1929 – 7 April 1989) was a French actor who was born in Paris and died in Le Pré-Saint-Gervais.

== Biography ==
Reybaz had a long career spanning 40 years, which mostly consisted of numerous French television appearances. In 1950 he starred in the writer Jean Genet's only film, the influential Un chant d'amour (aka A Song Of Love), which focused on the longing desires of the a prison guard and prisoners of a French jail.

== Filmography ==
Year	Title	Role	Notes
1941	Premier rendez-vous	Un élève du collège	Uncredited
1942	The Strangers in the House	Émile Manu	
1943	Vingt-cinq ans de bonheur	André Castille	
1943	Shop Girls of Paris	Jean Baudu	
1943	Le val d'enfer	Bastien Bienvenu	
1944	Cecile Is Dead	Gérard Pardon	
1946	Les clandestins	Jean	
1949	Du Guesclin		
1952	We Are All Murderers	Le père Simon	
1954	Royal Affairs in Versailles	Massillon	Uncredited
1954	Cadet Rousselle		Uncredited
1955	Les Chiffonniers d'Emmaüs	L'abbé Pierre Gronès, dit 'Le père'	
1959	Eyes of Love	Le curé	
1961	Il suffit d'aimer	Monsieur Pomian	
1971	To Die of Love	Le proviseur	
1972	Les camisards	Baron de Vergnas	
1973	There's No Smoke Without Fire		
1976	Body of My Enemy	Le président Kelfer	
1978	State Reasons	Security Chief	
1981	Dickie-roi	Le Comte de Saint-Nom	2 episodes
