= Seven Stories Press =

American independent publishing company

- Founded: 1995
- Founder: Dan Simon
- Country of origin: United States
- Headquarters location: New York City, United States
- Distribution: Penguin Random House Publisher Services (Global excluding UK); Turnaround Publisher Services (UK)
- Publication types: Books
- Imprints: Triangle Square, Siete Cuentos
- Official website: sevenstories.com

Seven Stories Press is an independent American publishing company based in New York City. It was founded by Dan Simon in 1995, after establishing Four Walls Eight Windows in 1984 as an imprint at Writers and Readers, and then incorporating it as an independent company in 1986 together with then-partner John Oakes. Seven Stories was named for its seven founding authors: Annie Ernaux, Gary Null, the estate of Nelson Algren, Project Censored, Octavia E. Butler, Charley Rosen, and Vassilis Vassilikos. Simon is co-founder of the Independent Publishers Caucus.

Seven Stories Press is known for its mix of politics and literature, and for its children's books. As the publisher of a large catalogue of activist nonfiction and history from such authors as Noam Chomsky, Angela Davis, Greg Palast and Howard Zinn, Seven Stories has had a major influence on public debate with books on foreign policy, the politics of prisons, and voter theft, among other topics. Prominent titles include Dark Alliance by Gary Webb, 9/11 by Noam Chomsky, A Man Without a Country by Kurt Vonnegut, and Octavia Butler's Parable of the Sower and Parable of the Talents.

Innosanto Nagara's A is for Activist, Howard Zinn's A Young People's History of the United States, and Angela Davis's Are Prisons Obsolete?, among many other titles, have educated communities of young people on key aspects of American history. Greg Palast's books have set the standard for raising awareness of vote theft in our elections. Seven Stories has for decades published the annual media censorship guide, Censored, by Project Censored, and the World Report by Human Rights Watch. Seven Stories also publishes a wide range of literature, poetry, and translations in prose and poetry from French, Spanish, Icelandic, German, Swedish, Italian, Greek, Polish, Korean, Vietnamese, Russian, and Arabic.

== Imprints ==
=== Siete Cuentos Editorial ===
Launched in 2000, Seven Stories’ Spanish-language imprint, Siete Cuentos Editorial, publishes English-language activist nonfiction and history for Spanish-language readers. Siete Cuentos has published Spanish-language editions of Our Bodies, Ourselves (Nuestros cuerpos, nuestras vidas) and A People's History of the United States (La otra historia de los Estados Unidos), among others. More recent Spanish translations include ‘68 by Paco Ignacio Taibo II, Columbus and Other Cannibals (Colón y otros caníbales) by Jack Forbes, 1491 (Una nueva historia de la Américas antes de Colón) by Charles C. Mann, and A is for Activist (A de Activista) by Innosanto Nagara.

=== Triangle Square Books for Young Readers ===
Launched in 2012, Triangle Square publishes progressive picture books, poetry collections, fiction, and nonfiction for preschool through young adult readers with the intent of promoting social justice, multicultural literacy, and environmental restoration. Triangle Square's bestselling titles include A is for Activist and Counting on Community by Innosanto Nagara, The Story of the Blue Planet by Andri Snær Magnason, 10,000 Dresses by Marcus Ewert, and What Makes a Baby and Sex is a Funny Word by Cory Silverberg. More recent Triangle Square Titles include Where Do They Go? by Julia Alvarez, The Wizard's Tears by Maxine Kumin and Anne Sexton, and Arno and the Mini-Machine by Seymour Chwast. Several titles in Triangle Square's For Young People series, which adapts essential adult nonfiction titles for younger readers, have been adopted for middle-grade classes in school districts across the country, including Howard Zinn's A Young People's History of the United States and Ronald Takaki's A Different Mirror for Young People.

=== Seven Stories UK ===
In 2016, Seven Stories UK was incorporated in England and is currently based in Liverpool. Seven Stories UK releases separate UK editions of literary titles, especially works in translation, and promotes Seven Stories Press titles with strong UK potential, such as feminist blogger Emma's The Mental Load and The Emotional Load, and American playwright and novelist Kia Corthron, author of The Castle Cross the Magnet Carter, winner of the Center for Fiction First Novel prize in 2016.

=== Two Dollar Radio ===
In April 2025, Seven Stories acquired Columbus, Ohio based independent publisher Two Dollar Radio, making it the company’s first acquisition and fourth imprint. Two Dollar Radio remains independent, with founders Eric Obenauf and Eliza Jane Wood-Obenauf retaining their editor roles. Two Dollar Radio is renowned for its quirky, edgy list of primarily fiction and essay collections.

== Authors published by Seven Stories ==
=== Fiction ===
- Tatamkhulu Afrika
- Nelson Algren
- Emmanuelle Bayamack-Tam
- François Bégaudeau
- Ivana Bodrožić
- Kate Braverman
- Octavia Butler
- Anton Chekhov
- Harriet Scott Chessman
- Liliana Corobca
- Céline Curiol
- Rick DeMarinis
- Alex DiFrancesco
- Linh Dinh

- Kent H. Dixon
- Assia Djebar
- Ariel Dorfman
- Martin Duberman
- Alan Dugan
- Marguerite Duras
- Annie Ernaux
- Marcus Ewert
- Cat Fitzpatrick
- Barry Gifford
- Jean Giono
- Beverly Gologorsky
- Ivan Goncharov
- Almudena Grandes

- Robert Graves
- Johan Harstad
- J.R. Helton
- Seba al-Herz
- Christopher R. Howard
- Hwang Sok-yong
- Gary Indiana
- Elfriede Jelinek
- Guus Kuijer
- Lola Lafon
- Khary Lazarre-White
- Andri Snær Magnason
- Avner Mandelman

- Stephanie McMillan
- Stanley Moss
- Luis Negrón
- Guadalupe Nettel
- Mikael Niemi
- Peter Plate
- Uday Prakash
- Youssef Rakha
- Davide Reviati
- Yasmina Reza
- Charley Rosen
- Rosario Santos
- Wallace Shawn

- Samuel Shem
- Layle Silbert
- Upton Sinclair
- Brian Francis Slattery
- Ted Solotaroff
- Lee Stringer
- Abdellah Taïa
- S.P. Tenhoff
- Nadia Terranova
- Vassilis Vassilikos
- Kurt Vonnegut
- Martin Winckler
- Chavisa Woods

=== Nonfiction ===
- Craig Aaron
- Elizabeth Abbott
- Bob Abernethy
- Mumia Abu-Jamal
- As'ad AbuKhalil
- Bruce Ackerman
- Ezequiel Adamovsky
- Eqbal Ahmad
- Michael Albert
- Aimee Allison
- Anthony Alvarado
- Amnesty International
- Anna Anthropy
- Anthony Arnove
- Tom Athanasiou
- Aung San Suu Kyi
- Bill Ayers
- Malaika wa Azania
- Normand Baillargeon
- Subhankar Banerjee

- David Barsamian
- Joel Berg
- Martin Bossenbroek
- Boston Women's Health Book Collective
- Art Buchwald
- Nina Burleigh
- Vitalik Buterin
- Klester Cavalcanti
- Center for Constitutional Rights
- Fairness and Accuracy in Reporting
- Noam Chomsky
- Angela Davis
- Michael Deibert
- Emma
- Sarah Erdreich
- Samuel Epstein
- Elizabeth Ewen
- Stuart Ewen
- Karlene Faith
- Josh Fox
- Eva Gabrielsson
- J. Malcolm Garcia

- Loren Glass
- Mike Gravel
- D.D. Guttenplan
- Ed Halter
- Shere Hite
- Jack Hoffman
- Phil Jackson
- Russell Jacoby
- Wojciech Jagielski
- Christina Jarvis
- Derrick Jensen
- Savannah Knoop
- Paul Krassner
- Joan Kruckewitt
- Kalle Lasn
- Andrew Laties
- Martha Long
- Lydia Lunch
- Joel Magnuson
- Dale Maharidge
- Subcomandante Marcos
- Robin Marty

- Robert W. McChesney
- Suzanne McConnell
- Ralph Nader
- Loretta Napoleoni
- Huey P. Newton
- William A. Noguera
- Gary Null
- Greg Palast
- Hugh Pearson
- Peter Phillips
- Sam Pizzigati
- Benjamin Pogrund
- Ted Rall
- Luis J. Rodriguez
- Arundhati Roy
- Laurie Rubin
- Greg Ruggiero
- Lynne Sharon Schwartz
- Barbara Seaman
- Tara Seibel
- Vandana Shiva

- Nancy Snow
- Gregory Sumner
- Paco Ignacio Taibo II
- John R. Talbott
- Leora Tanenbaum
- Quincy Troupe
- David Van Reybrouck
- Barney Rosset
- Rodolfo Walsh
- Koigi wa Wamwere
- Gary Webb
- Fred A. Wilcox
- Sean Michael Wilson
- Minky Worden
- Howard Zinn

=== Siete Cuentos ===
- Julia Alvarez
- Gonzàlo Alburto Iniesta
- Laura Castañeda
- Noam Chomsky*
- Angie Cruz*
- Ariel Dorfman*
- Jack Forbes*

- Jorge Franco
- Alejandro Junger
- Néstor Kohan
- Charles C. Mann*
- Subcomandante Marcos
- Alfredo Placeres

- Tanya Reinhart*
- Sonia Rivera-Valdés
- Cory Silverberg*
- Paco Ignacio Taibo II
- Ángela Vallvey
- Howard Zinn*

* Indicates authors whose work was published in Spanish translation

=== Triangle Square Books for Young Readers ===
- Julia Alvarez
- Ali Berman
- Tamara Bower
- Seymour Chwast
- Meryl Danziger
- Jared Diamond

- Ariel Dorfman
- Morten Dürr
- Marcus Ewert
- Robert Graves
- Harriet Hyman Alonso
- Etgar Keret

- Maxine Kumin
- Celeste Lecesne
- Andri Snær Magnason
- Charles C. Mann
- Innosanto Nagara
- Mark Reibstein

- Susan Robeson
- Laurie Rubin
- José Saramago
- Hal Schrieve
- Anne Sexton
- Cory Silverberg

- Ronald Takaki
- Olga Tokarczuk
- Eymard Toledo
- Patrice Vecchione
- Emma Williams
- Ed Young
- Howard Zinn

== Award-winning work ==
Annie Ernaux
2022 — Winner Nobel Prize in Literature
Emma Ramadan
2021 – Winner PEN America Translation Prize for A Country for Dying
Emmanuelle Bayamack-Tam
2019 – Winner Prix du Livre Inter for Arcadia
Nadia Terranova
2019 – Winner Premio Alassio Centolibri for Farewell, Ghosts
Morten Dürr
2017 – Winner Danish National Illustration Award for Zenobia
Chavisa Woods
2017 – Winner Shirley Jackson Award for "Take the Way Home That Leads Back to Sullivan Street" in Things To Do When You're Goth in the Country
Davide Reviati
2017 – Winner Attilio Micheluzzi Prize for Best Writing for Spit Three Times
2016 – Winner Carlo Boscarato Prize for Spit Three Times
2016 – Winner Lo Straniero Prize for Spit Three Times
Yasmina Reza
2016 – Winner Prix Renaudot for Babylon
Annie Ernaux
2022 – Winner Nobel Prize in Literature for her literary works in general
2016 – Winner Strega European Prize for The Years
Lola Lafon
2016 – Winner Prix de la Closerie des Lilas for The Little Communist Who Never Smiled
Corey Silverberg
2016 – Winner Stonewall Book Award for Children's & Young Adult for Sex is a Funny Word
Kia Corthron
2016 – Winner Center for Fiction First Novel Prize for The Castle Cross the Magnet Carter
Aharon Appelfeld
2016 – Winner Sydney Taylor Book Award for Adam and Thomas
2016 – Winner Batchelder Honor for Adam and Thomas
Luis Negrón
2014 – Winner Lambda Award for Gay General Fiction for Mundo Cruel
Guadalupe Nettel
2014 – Winner Herralde Novel Prize for The Body Where I was Born
Project Censored
2014 – Winner Whistleblower Summit's Pillar Award for New Media and Journalism
Martin Bossenbroek
2013 – Winner Libris History Prize for The Boer War
Ivana Bodrožić
2013 – Winner Prix Ulysse for Hotel Tito
Stephanie McMillan
2012 – Winner Robert F. Kennedy Journalism Award in Cartoon for The Beginning of the American Fall and Code Green
Linh Dinh
2011 – Winner Balcones Fiction Prize Love Like Hate
Barry Gifford
2007 – Winner Christopher Isherwood Foundation Award for Fiction for Memories from a Sinking Ship
Avner Mandelman
2005 – Winner I.J. Siegel Award for Jewish Fiction for Talking to the Enemy
Ralph Nader
2001 – Winner Firecracker Alternative Book Award for The Ralph Nader Reader
Alan Dugan
2001 – Winner National Book Award for Poetry for Poems Seven
Jorge Franco
2000 – Winner Dashiell Hammett Prize for Rosario Tijeras
Martin Winckler
1998 – Winner Prix du Livre for The Case of Dr. Sachs
Sonia Rivera-Valdés
1997 – Winner Casa de las Américas for Las historias prohibidas de Marta Veneranda
