= Maciej Kisilowski =

Polish academic

Maciej Kisilowski is a Polish academic. He is associate professor in law and strategy at Central European University as well as the faculty director of CEU Executive MBA program. He is an expert on public-sector strategy as well as nonmarket strategy of businesses.

He publishes in law, management and political science. His practice book on public-sector strategy, Administrategia, co-authored with a management consultant Izabela Kisilowska (Kisilowski’s wife), was published in four languages. He was one of the first Polish scholars who warned in international media about the authoritarian intentions of the right-wing government of the Law and Justice party after their coming to power in November 2015.

Kisilowski holds a J.S.D. and an LL.M. degree from Yale University, a PhD and M.A. in law from University of Warsaw, an M.B.A. from Insead and an M.P.A. in economics and public policy from Princeton University.

== Biography ==
Kisilowski attended Warsaw’s Stefan Batory Liceum where he was the head of student government involved in building a regional representation of students in Mazovian Voivodeship. He then studied law at the University of Warsaw and continued his graduate education in the United States, France and Singapore. He received his J.S.D. from Yale Law School in 2012 for a dissertation about weaknesses of Poland’s lawmaking system and legal culture in general, written under the supervision of Susan Rose-Ackerman and with the doctoral committee including Michael E. Levine, Mirjan Damaska and John G. Simon. During his doctoral studies at Yale, he took a leave of absence to pursue an M.B.A. at Insead, spending a term at Wharton School of the University of Pennsylvania. He also earned an MPA in economics and public policy at Princeton School of Public and International Affairs, where he worked with Kim Scheppele.

In 2008, Kisilowski also obtained a Ph.D. in law at University of Warsaw; his supervisor was Andrzej Stelmachowski. A book on the law and public policy of the nongovernmental organizations based on his dissertation was published in 2009 by the Polish branch of LexisNexis. Stelmachowski wrote the foreword to the book shortly before his death in April 2009.

After his studies, Kisilowski joined the faculty of Central European University where he obtained tenure in 2017. In 2019, he was appointed the faculty director of CEU Executive MBA, which he restarted in Vienna after the CEU’s move from Hungary due to the actions of Hungarian government.

=== Response to Poland’s constitutional crisis ===
Kisilowski has been a vocal critic of the Law and Justice government as well as the Fidesz government in Hungary. In January 2016, together with Bruce Ackerman, he called in Foreign Policy for moving the location of the upcoming NATO summit from Warsaw to Tallinn, Estonia. In 2017, he was featured in "Fatal Attraction" – special magazine of the Project Syndicate – along with, among others, Tony Blair, Francis Fukuyama, George Soros, and Donald Tusk. Kisilowski’s comment compared political strategies of right-wing populists such as Donald Trump, Viktor Orban or Jarosław Kaczyński to Blue Ocean Strategies adopted by businesses.

While right-wing media in Poland frequently characterized Kisilowski as an anti-PiS hawk, in fact, Kisilowski called for exploring possibilities of a new constitutional settlement in Poland after a potential electoral defeat of the Law and Justice. In 2018, he founded, along with political scientist Anna Wojciuk and historian Antoni Dudek, the Social Contract Incubator (Inkubator Umowy Społecznej or IUS). IUS is a network of academics who, in 2019, presented a comprehensive constitutional proposal based on the idea of targeted decentralization. The proposal attracted significant media attention. Opponents tried to connect the proposal to the political advisory work that Kisilowski did for the leadership of the main opposition party Civic Platform. According to both the state-owned and opposition media, Kisilowski’s proposals "were viewed favorably" by Donald Tusk. Some notable right-wing commentators were sympathetic to the proposal, however. Łukasz Warzecha called it "an impressive piece of solid work," while voicing some reservations. Andrzej Krajewski praised the "perverse charm" of IUS, calling Kisilowski, Dudek and Wojciuk "media faces of the proposal".
