= Inosanto =

Inosanto or Innosanto may refer to the following people:

Given name

- Innosanto Nagara, children's author, activist, and graphic designer born in Indonesia

Surname

- Dan Inosanto (born 1936), Filipino-American martial arts instructor
- Diana Lee Inosanto (born 1966), American actress, stuntwoman and martial artist, daughter of Dan
