= Deibert =

Deibert is a surname of German origin. Notable people with the surname include:

- Adam Deibert (born 1976), American musician and voice actor
- Michael Deibert (born 1973), American journalist
- Randy Deibert, American politician
- Ronald Deibert (born 1964), Canadian professor
- Scott Deibert (born 1970), Canadian football player
