= Stuart Ewen =

American historian

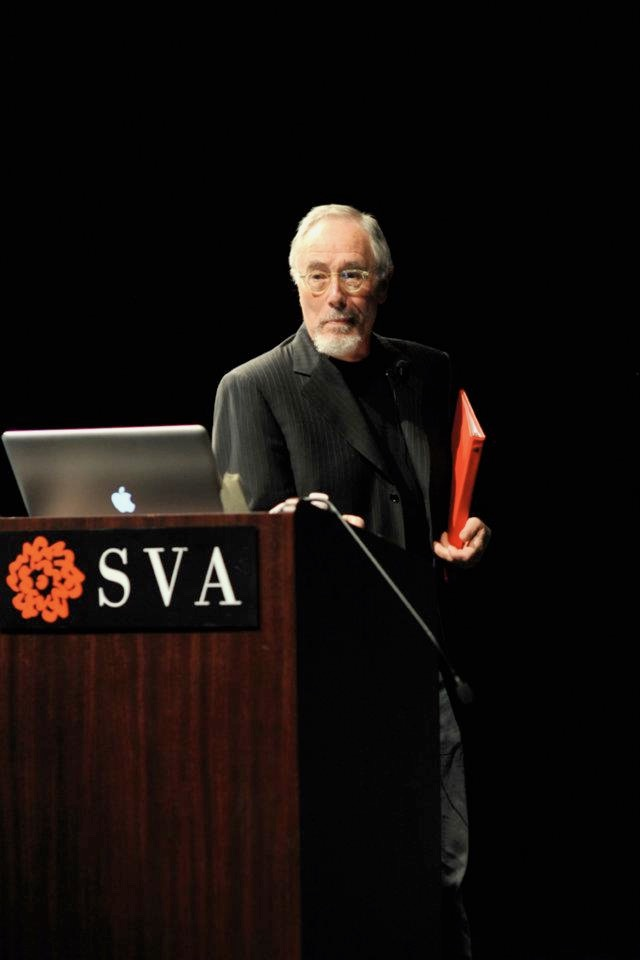
- Born: New York City
- Other name: Archie Bishop
- Occupations: Writer, historian, professor
- Spouse: Elizabeth Ewen [deceased]

Stuart Ewen (born 1945) is a New York-based author, historian and lecturer on media, consumer culture, and the compliance profession. He is also a Distinguished Professor at Hunter College and the City University of New York Graduate Center, in the departments of History, Sociology and Media Studies. He is the author of six books. Under the pen name Archie Bishop, Ewen has also worked as a graphic artist, photographer, pamphleteer, and agitprop activist for many years.

== Biography ==
As a young man, in 1964 and early 1965, Ewen was a field secretary for the civil rights organization the Student Nonviolent Coordinating Committee (SNCC). After working as a volunteer in the Freedom House in Columbus, Mississippi, he became part of the SNCC staff, earning the standard pay of $9.66 per week. After working in Columbus, he and Isaac Coleman, who was the project director, opened up a new field office in Tupelo, Mississippi. In 1966, Ewen was one of the founding editors of an early underground newspaper, Connections, in Madison, Wisconsin, where he was a student.

In his 1976 book Captains of Consciousness: Advertising and the Social Roots of the Consumer Culture, Ewen discussed his concerns about what he referred to as the "commodification of consciousness", and coined the term "commodity self" to describe an identity built by the goods we consume.

In 1989, his book All Consuming Images provided the basis for Bill Moyers' four-part award-winning series, "The Public Mind." In 2004, another of his books, PR! A Social History of Spin, was the foundation of a four-part BBC series, "The Century of the Self," produced by Adam Curtis. "PR!" also provided the foundation for the 2018 French documentary, "Propaganda: La fabrique du consentement," directed by Jimmy Leipold and produced by Arte Television and INAfr. It was also the foundation of a 2020 Russian television documentary, "Стюарт Юэн. PR: как создается правда?"

Ewen has become a spokesman against violations of academic freedom in the period since 9/11, and is the chairman of the Board of Directors of the Frederic Ewen Academic Freedom Center at NYU, which is named after his great uncle, a professor at Brooklyn College who was forced to resign after refusing to testify before HUAC.

== Works ==
=== Books ===
- Captains of Consciousness: Advertising and the Social Roots of the Consumer Culture. New York: McGraw-Hill (1976). ISBN 0070198454.
- Channels of Desire: Mass Images and the Shaping of American Consciousness (co-authored with Elizabeth Ewen). New York: McGraw-Hill (1982). ISBN 978-0816618903.
- All Consuming Images: The Politics of Style in Contemporary Culture. New York: Basic Books (1988). ISBN 978-0465001019.
- PR!: A Social History of Spin. New York: Basic Books (1996). ISBN 978-0465061686.
- The New Media Reader: Introduction to Media Studies Critical Texts. Boston: Houghton Mifflin Company (2001). ISBN 061815230X.
- Typecasting: On the Arts and Sciences of Human Inequality (co-authored with Elizabeth Ewen). New York: Seven Stories Press (2006). ISBN 978-1583227350.
  - Revised ed. (2008). ISBN 978-1583227763.

=== Articles and essays ===
- "Mass Culture, Narcissism and the Moral Economy of War". Telos 44 (Summer 1980). New York: Telos Press
- Crystallizing Public Opinion (Edward Bernays, Introduction by Stuart Ewen), New York: IG Publishing, 2011. ISBN 978-1-935439-26-4
