= John M. Ackerman =

Mexican activist

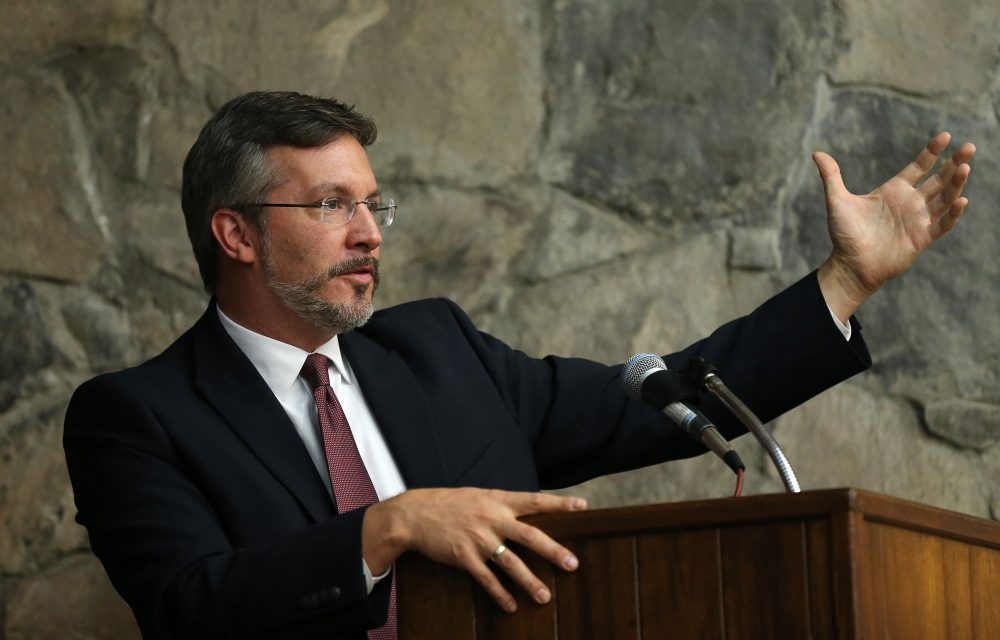
- Born: Philadelphia, Pennsylvania, U.S.
- Education: Swarthmore College, BA; University of California, Santa Cruz, PhD
- Employer: National Autonomous University of Mexico
- Spouse: Irma Sandoval-Ballesteros
- Parents: Bruce Ackerman (father); Susan Rose-Ackerman (mother)

John Mill Ackerman Rose is an American-born, naturalized Mexican political activist, TV host, and academic at the National Autonomous University of Mexico (UNAM).

== Early life and education ==
He is the son of social liberal thinker Bruce Ackerman (of Hungarian-Jewish and Polish-Jewish origins) and the economist Susan Rose-Ackerman, both professors at Yale Law School.

He earned his undergraduate degree from Swarthmore College and received his MA and PhD in Political Sociology from the University of California, Santa Cruz.

== Career ==
Ackerman is a professor of constitutional law at UNAM's Law School, and editor-in-chief of the Mexican Law Review magazine.

He has contributed to newspapers such as Proceso, La Jornada, El Universal, Reforma of Mexico, The New York Times, Los Angeles Times, Chicago Tribune, San Francisco Chronicle, Houston Chronicle, San Diego Union-Tribune in the United States and The Guardian in the United Kingdom on the topics of corruption control, elections, transparency, accountability, autonomous institutions and citizen participation.

He has also published research results in World Development, Administrative Law Review, Boletín Mexicano de Derecho Comparado, Mexican Law Review, Gestión y Política Pública, and Perfiles Latinoamericanos. He has also served as a senior consultant for the World Bank as well as a consultant for the United States Agency for International Development, Organisation for Economic Co-operation and Development, PNUD, Global Integrity, Open Society Institute, International Budget Partnership, Secretary of the Public Function, United Nations Development Programme, Supreme Court of Justice of the Nation, the Chamber of Deputies and for the Head of Government of the Federal District.

He is the host of two political talk shows, Diálogos por la democracia on TV UNAM, and John y Sabina with Sabina Berman, broadcast by Canal Once. The John y Sabina show has been criticized by the opposition as being government propaganda expensively funded with public money.

== Political ideology ==
Ackerman is an activist for left-wing causes and an active supporter of National Regeneration Movement (Morena), a political party, and of its leader, Andrés Manuel López Obrador. He is married to Irma Eréndira Sandoval, former member of the cabinet as Secretary of the Civil Service.

Ackerman defended the government of Nicolás Maduro, saying Venezuela was "much more democratic and respectful of human rights than Mexico". In the same article, published in La Jornada on 27 March 2017, Ackerman claimed there was no electoral fraud in Venezuela, that there is constant media censorship in Mexico, that there are more political prisoners in Mexico than in any other Latin American country and that there is a clear separation of branches of government in Venezuela. He also claimed that Mexico is worse off than Venezuela in terms of corruption, poverty, inequality and violence.

== Publications ==
- Social Accountability in the Public Sector: A Conceptual Discussion (World Bank, 2005)
- Leyes de acceso a la información pública en el mundo (Instituto Federal de Acceso a la Información Pública, 2005)
- Estructura institucional para la rendición de cuentas: Lecciones internacionales y reformas futuras (Auditoría Superior de la Federación, 2006)
- Organismos autónomos y democracia: el caso de México (Siglo XXI Editores-Instituto de Investigaciones Jurídicas, UNAM, 2007)
- Más allá del acceso a la información: Transparencia, rendición de cuentas y Estado de Derecho (Instituto de Investigaciones Jurídicas, UNAM-Cámara de Diputados-Siglo XXI Editores-Univ. de Guadalajara-CETA, 2008)
- El mito de la transición democrática: Nuevas coordenadas para la transformación del régimen mexicano (Editorial Planeta, 2015)

== Controversies ==
=== Comparison of journalists with drug cartel hitmen ===
On June 26, 2020, the head of Public Security in Mexico City, Omar García Harfuch, survived an attempt on his life which he later blamed on the Jalisco New Generation Cartel. Reacting to the news, Ackerman published a tweet on his personal Twitter account comparing journalists who have been critical of the government of Andrés Manuel López Obrador with drug cartel hitmen (sicarios), calling them "media sicarios". Mexico's National Human Rights Commission (Comisión Nacional de Derechos Humanos, CNDH) and Reporteros Sin Fronteras condemned Ackerman's tweet, calling it "irresponsible" given that Mexico is one of the most dangerous countries for journalists.

=== Participation in the technical evaluation committee of the National Electoral Institute ===
In February 2020 Ackerman was proposed by Rosario Piedra Ibarra, director of the National Human Rights Commission to be a member of the technical evaluation committee of the National Electoral Institute (Instituto Nacional Electoral, INE). This committee has an important role in selecting INE's new directors and Ackerman's nomination was met with criticism due to his close personal and political affinity with the government, and being part of the ruling party's cadre training body. Congressman Juan Carlos Romero Hicks from the National Action Party (Partido Acción Nacional, PAN) said that Ackerman did not meet the required neutral background, and René Juárez Cisneros from the Institutional Revolutionary Party (Partido Revolucionario Insitucional, PRI) asked the CNDH to reconsider the nomination due to Ackerman's position in a political party. Together with the PAN and the PRI, two other opposition parties, the Party of the Democratic Revolution (PRD) and Citizen's Movement (MC) unsuccessfully challenged Ackerman's designation, which was confirmed by the Federal Electoral Tribunal.
