= Kia Corthron =

American dramatist

- Born: May 13, 1961 (age 65); Cumberland, Maryland, U.S.
- Education: University of Maryland, College Park (BA); Columbia University (MFA)
- Occupations: Playwright, television writer, novelist

Kia Corthron (born May 13, 1961) is an American playwright, activist, television writer, and novelist. She received the 2014 Windham–Campbell Literature Prize in Drama which is one of the largest prizes in the world of its kind. In 2022, her hometown newspaper named Corthron one of the region's 30 most influential people of color.

== Early life and education ==
Kia Corthron was born on May 13, 1961, in Cumberland, Maryland. Corthron's father worked at a paper mill in the area and died at the age of 51 from an aneurysm while working at the mill. Growing up in the mostly white, industrial town, Corthron discovered her passion for writing early on. Corthron has credited her second grade teacher, Mrs. Proudfoot, as being the person who first encouraged her to write. She persisted in creating dialogues out of a need for entertainment while her older sister was at school.

Corthron is the second of three sisters. Her younger sister, Kara Corthron, is a playwright and novelist.

Corthron attended the University of Maryland for an undergraduate degree in communications and film. Even though she had been writing for years, it was not until the last semester of her senior year that she first turned on to writing plays. During a creative writing class, Corthon was assigned a group project of creating a play. She worked on the play for the entire semester, revising and reworking the text, which concluded in a final performance. The plot dealt with a returning Vietnam veteran and his sister, but the success of the short piece was not the plot, it was the impact the play had on the classroom audience. She told the Theater Development Fund's periodical, Sightlines, "When it came time to do scenes from our plays, I was embarrassed when mine lasted 30 minutes when everyone else's was only five (they were all supposed to be five), but I was soon gratified when the lights came up and I saw how my writing affected the other students." One woman in the class began sobbing quietly in the background during the reading. According to Corthron, that moment, when she was able to communicate on such a deep level with her classmates, made her realize that she wanted to touch people like this again, to share and awaken feelings about important issues.

Affecting audiences was something that energized Corthron. This was also something which drove her to hone her craft as a playwright. After graduating, Corthron was chosen for a one-year workshop with George Washington University playwright Lonnie Garter. Under the direction of Garter, Corthron applied to the Master of Fine Arts program at Columbia University. Corthron was accepted and attended Columbia where she studied under professors such as Howard Stein, Glenn Young, and Lavonne Mueller.

== Career ==
=== Playwriting ===
Upon graduation in 1992, Corthron began writing plays and was granted a commission from the Goodman Theater in Chicago to write the play Seeking the Genesis, a piece dealing with parents drugging their children with Ritalin and the proposed government drugging of urban youth to prevent violence.

Since her graduation, Corthron has received commissions for workshops, readings, and productions throughout the country. Beginning with Chicago's Goodman Theatre, she has had commissions from the Royal Court Theatre in London, the Alabama Shakespeare Festival, the Atlantic Theatre Company, the Manhattan Theatre Club, the Mark Taper Forum, the Public Media Foundation, the Children's Theatre Company, and National Public Radio with The Public Theater. She developed her work through numerous reputable workshops, including the National Playwrights Conference, the Sundance retreat at Ucross, the Hedgebrook writer's retreat, the Audrey Skirball-Kenis Theatre Project, the Shenandoah International Playwrights Retreat, Intiman Theatre, A Contemporary Theatre, Crossroads Theatre Company's Genesis Festival, The Public Theater's New Work Now! Festival, Voice and Vision, and the Circle Rep Lab.

Most of Corthron's work revolves around socio-political issues. For instance, her work Force Continuum from 2000 dealt with the issue of police brutality. Her shorter piece Safe Box centered on an industry that dumped cancer-causing chemicals into the air and water. Her two-act drama Glimpse of the Ephemeral Dot dealt with veterans' issues. Life by Asphyxiation takes an anti-death-penalty stance.

Corthron has acquired many awards, including the Daryl Roth Creative Spirit Award, the Mark Taper Forum's Fadiman Award, NEA/TCG Theatre Residency Program for Playwrights, a Kennedy Center Fund for New American Plays, the New Professional Theatre Playwriting Award, the Callaway Award, a Van Lier Fellowship, and was Delaware Theatre Company's first Connections contest winner.

One of Kia Corthron's most influential plays is Force Continuum, which centers around "an African-American police officer who struggles with the contradictions of his race and profession while confronting the black community he is bound to protect and being haunted by his cop father's violent death". Throughout this play Kia Corthron draws parallels to the real world through the controversial topic of police brutality, which helps the audience perceive these types of situations from the perspective of both sides. This in turn gives both parties the opportunity to explain the reasoning behind their actions and possibly receive some form of understanding from their critics.

Corthron's latest play, A Cool Dip in the Barren Saharan Crick, received its world premiere production by Playwrights Horizons and The Play Company in March and April 2010 at Playwrights Horizons' Peter Jay Sharp Theater in New York City. The play concerns Abebe, an African preacher-in-training who arrives in a drought-stricken rural American town intending to further his studies in religion and water conservation. Hosted by a mother and daughter haunted by tragedy, he takes an interest in a young orphan starved for guidance – all the while maintaining an infectious optimism in the face of his obstacles. Undaunted, Abebe determines to battle – by any means necessary – the personal and political forces that threaten the ecology of his new home.

=== Fiction ===
Corthron's first novel, The Castle Cross the Magnet Carter, was published by Seven Stories Press in January 2016. It won the 2016 Center for Fiction First Novel Prize, and the New York Times Book Review Editors' Choice. Her second novel, Moon and the Mars, was published in 2021, also by Seven Stories.

=== Television writing ===
Corthron's first TV credit was for an episode of the 2004 series, The Jury called Lamentation on the Reservation. In 2006 she wrote an episode of The Wire's fourth season entitled "Know Your Place" which earned her Writers Guild Outstanding Drama Series Award and an Edgar Award.

=== Humanitarian efforts ===
In 2002 Corthron traveled with five other playwrights to Palestine, visiting theaters on the West Bank and Gaza. She was one of nine American playwrights selected by Minneapolis' Guthrie Theater for a special world travel/play commissioning grant. With their aid, In 2004, Kia chose to travel to Liberia while the country was recovering from its civil war, and has since been working with the theater on her play Tap the Leopard, chronicling the historical relationship connecting the U.S. and Liberia, from the initial tensions between immigrant American free blacks and the majority native population in the 19th century through the strife of the late 20th and 21st centuries.

== Awards and honors ==
- 2014 United States Artist (USA) Fellow in Theater October 2014; $50,000 unrestricted grant.,
- 2014 Windham–Campbell Literature Prize (Drama), valued at $150,000 one of the largest prizes in the world of its kind.
- 2016 Center for Fiction First Novel Prize $10,000
- 2017 MacDowell Colony Fellowship
