= Laurie Rubin =

American mezzo-soprano (born 1979)

Laurie Rubin (born 1979) is an American classical mezzo-soprano who has performed as a recitalist, as a concert singer and in opera.

== Early life and education ==
Rubin grew up in Encino, Los Angeles, California. She She began learning piano at age four, and credits her interest in classical musical to her Austrian grandparents, who exposed her to the genre. She later decided to pursue opera as a career after attending a performance of The Phantom of the Opera at age 11.

Rubin was born blind, and learned social cues, such as nodding or shrugging, from her brother. Her mother fought to have her admitted to Oakwood, the school her brother attended. Rubin attended Hebrew school as a child, and her synagogue, Valley Beth Shalom, allowed her to read her Torah portion in Braille during her bat mitzvah.

She was trained at Oberlin College and the Yale School of Music.

== Career ==
At age 12, Rubin contributed a "little scat solo" to the Kenny Loggins track “If You Believe” from his 1991 album, Leap of Faith. At age 14, she sang at the inauguration of Los Angeles mayor Richard Riordan.

In 1997, she won the Music Center Spotlight Award. Her first CD, an art song recording in which she is accompanied by David Wilkinson, was released in 1998.

In 2012, Rubin performed at the Kennedy Center.

Rubin never learned to read Braille music, and learns all of her pieces by ear.

=== Opera ===
Her orchestral repertoire includes Beethoven's Symphony No. 9, Berlioz's Les nuits d'été, Handel's Messiah, Joseph Haydn's Harmoniemesse and Mozart's Great Mass in C minor.

Her most notable theatrical roles are Elle in Poulenc's La voix humaine and Mrs Noye in Britten's Noye's Fludde. Among the colleagues with whom she has worked are Graham Johnson, Frederica von Stade, John Williams, the Los Angeles Chamber Orchestra, the Rochester Chamber Orchestra and the Yale Symphony Orchestra. Venues at which she has appeared include Carnegie Hall's Weill Recital Hall, Lincoln Center, Parcol Auditorium della Musica, the Ravinia Festival, the 92nd Street Y, the Wigmore Hall and the White House.

==== Notable roles ====
Year	Work	Role	Production	Notes	Ref
2007	Gordon Beeferman's The Rat Land	Karen	New York City Opera		
2008	Monteverdi's Il ritorno d'Ulisse in patria	Penelope	Greenwich Music Festival		
2009	Gordon Beeferman's The Rat Land	Karen	New York City Opera		
2011	Rossini's La Cenerentola	Angelina			
2015	Vireo: The Spiritual Biography of A Witch's Accuser	The Voice/Witch			
2024	Nadia Boulanger’s La ville morte		Catapult Opera	Planned for April 2024 - American premiere	

=== Writing ===
Rubin's memoir, Do You Dream in Color? Insights from a Girl without Sight, was published by Seven Stories Press in October 2012.

=== Teaching ===
Rubin and her wife, Jennifer Rubin-Taira, jointly founded the Ohana Arts Performing Arts Festival and School in the early 2010s. In fall 2015, they premiered Peace on Your Wings, a musical based on the story of Sadako Sasaki, at the school. The piece was reprised again in 2023.

In the 2010s, Rubin received a grant from Yale to develop a music curriculum that used blindfolding activities to model to sighted students what the experience of blind students is like.

== Personal life ==
Rubin is Jewish and a lesbian. She is married to composer, clarinetist and pianist Jennifer Rubin-Taira, whom she met while attending Yale. The two have been together since the early 2000s, and they reside in Honolulu.

She is also a motivational speaker, and designs and manufactures jewellery.
