= John R. Talbott =

John R. Talbott is an American finance expert, author, commentator, and political analyst. He is known for having predicted national and international economic crises in the past decade.

== Career ==
Talbott graduated with a BS in Civil Engineering from Cornell University and received an MBA in Finance from the Anderson School of Business at UCLA. He served on the leveraged buyout team at Goldman Sachs during the 1990s and was a visiting scholar at the UCLA business school.

Talbott has written nine books on economics and politics. His first work, Slave Wages, published in 1999, warned of the breakdown in the internet stock craze that came to fruition in 2000–2001. The Coming Crash in the Housing Market: 10 Things You Can Do Now to Protect Your Most Valuable Investments (McGraw-Hill, 2003), accurately predict the current real estate bubble and earned him a reputation as "an oracle with a track record". The book was an Amazon.com and Business Week bestseller, but received a very skeptical review from the Wall Street Journal in 2003. In 2004 Financial Times Prentice Hall Books published Talbott's book Where America Went Wrong: And How To Regain Her Democratic Ideals, which examined the relationship between prosperous economies and democratic institutions. His next book, Sell Now: The End of the Housing Bubble (St. Martin's Griffin, 2006), cemented his status as one of the first financial authors to predict the global banking crisis. It was reviewed by the San Francisco Chronicle.

His book Obamanomics: How Bottom-Up Economic Prosperity Will Replace Trickle-Down Economics (Seven Stories Press), was completed in early 2008 and published in July of that year, and described the economic policies that would characterize the Obama administration in response to what Talbott believed would be a staggering world economic crisis. It has been reviewed by the Los Angeles Times, and the New York Times and translated into Japanese, Korean and Chinese. The Hartford Courant, in an AP story, described it as a "sleeper hit".

Contagion: The Financial Epidemic That Is Sweeping the Global Economy ... and How to Protect Yourself from It (Wiley, 2008), dissects the possibility of a global recession and the ways in which individuals can protect themselves and their investments.

Talbott's book The 86 Biggest Lies on Wall Street was published in June by Seven Stories Press in the US and Constable & Robinson in the UK.

How I Predicted the Global Banking Crisis: The Most Amazing Book You'll Never Read was published in 2011 and is an introduction to Talbott's economics and his previous writings.

Survival Investing: How to Prosper Amid Thieving Banks and Corrupt Governments is Talbott's most recent finance book and was published by Palgrave Macmillan in June 2012. In the book, Talbott explains why holding traditional financial investments like stocks, bonds and Treasuries will perform badly in the continuing tough economic climate ahead.

According to Talbott's website www.StopTheLying.com, he has also written articles for numerous publications including The New Republic, The Financial Times, The Wall Street Journal, and The Boston Globe. Talbott has appeared as a commentator on CNN, Fox, CNBC, FBN, CBS, and MSNBC.
