= A Is for Activist =

Children's book about activism

A is for Activist
- Author: Innosanto Nagara
- Audio read by: Tom Morello
- Illustrator: Innosanto Nagara
- Language: English
- Publisher: Triangle Square
- Publication date: 19 November 2013
- Publication place: USA
- Pages: 32
- ISBN: 978-1-60980-539-5
- Website: www.aisforactivist.com

A is for Activist is a children's alphabet board book by Innosanto Nagara. His debut as both an author and an illustrator, he initially wrote it for his children out of a desire for a political yet educational book, and then, receiving positive responses from both friends and Kickstarter campaign, published it through Triangle Square.

== Background ==
Nagara, heavily involved in activism and social justice initiatives, originally wrote A is for Activist for his son, out of a perceived need for a "pro-activist, pro-social justice, pro-gay, pro-labor, pro-diversity, pro-gressive ABC book." On the recommendation of friends, he sought to publish a larger run of the book, finding that the costs of printing individual board books quickly became prohibitive. Eventually, Nagara started a campaign on Kickstarter that raised $4,501 in 30 days. That allowed him to self-publish and have 3,000 copies of the book printed—he packaged them in his home and sent orders out through the post office, and despite being a one-man operation, sold all 3,000 copies in a matter of months.

Nagara began sending his book to various independent presses, but found that most had "reservations" about the cost of printing and were unfamiliar with the format. Eventually, he found a publisher in Triangle Square, an imprint of Seven Stories Press, and the book has had more than four printings. Seven Stories' Spanish-language imprint, Siete Cuentos, also published an edition translated by the musician Martha Gonzalez in fall 2014. An audiobook version, read by the guitarist and activist Tom Morello, has been made free online.

== Reception ==
Over 125,000 copies of the book are in print, making it a children's bestseller according to The New York Times. The Times also called identified it as one of many topical children's books oriented towards social issues that have become a trend recently. Authors including Naomi Klein, Opal Palmer Adisa, and Winona LaDuke have all reacted positively and other reviewers, like Yes! Magazine found the book and its content charming, stating that the "alliteration and rhymes have the rhythm and fun of standard ABC books," while still imparting a political message.

Other reviewers who have agreed with the political messages of the book have questioned if they really belong in an alphabet book at all. Kyle Lukoff, writing for the American Library Association, wondered "if a clumsily-rhymed collection of chants is an effective way to accomplish" introducing children to social justice and pointed out that families "may need to undergo hours of explanation and long, ongoing conversations about ideas raised on every single page." Leslie Aitken (The Deakin Review of Children's Literature) gave it 1 out of 4 stars, writing that the board book failed as a teaching aid, citing inappropriate mnemonics and illustrations which would not be grasped by small children.
