= Social contract =

Concept in political philosophy

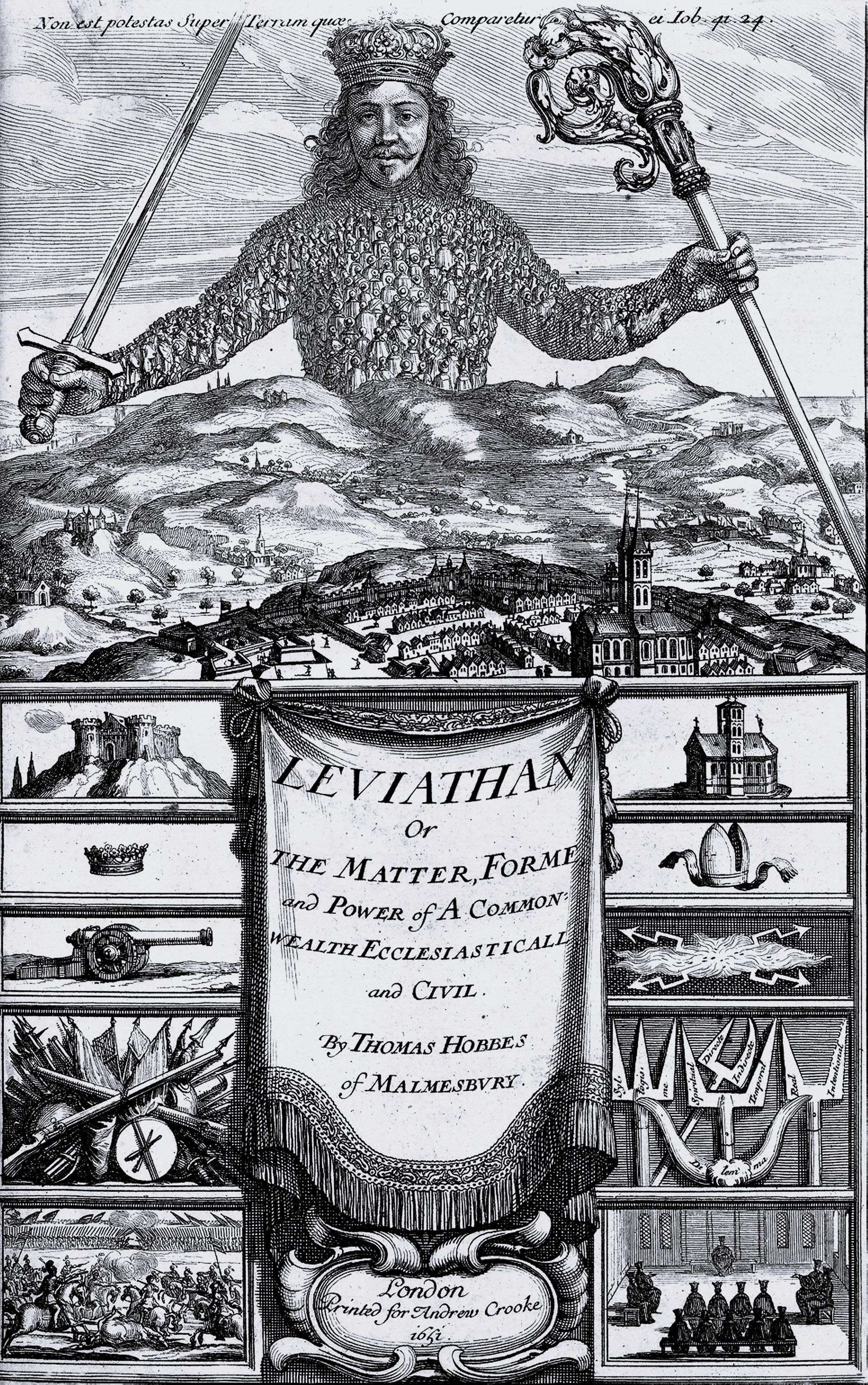
The original cover of Thomas Hobbes's work Leviathan (1651), in which he discusses the concept of the social contract theory

In moral and political philosophy, the social contract is a theory of state that conceives of a legitimate state as arising from the agreement of citizens who consent to surrender some of their freedoms and submit to the authority (of the ruler, or to the decision of a majority) in exchange for protection of their remaining rights or maintenance of the social order.

Conceptualized in the Age of Enlightenment, social contractarianism is a core concept of modern theories of constitutionalism. The term takes its name from The Social Contract (French: Du contrat social ou Principes du droit politique), a 1762 book by Jean-Jacques Rousseau that discussed this concept. The starting point for most social contract theories is an examination of the human condition absent any political order, a social position termed the "state of nature" by Thomas Hobbes.

In this condition, individuals' actions are bound only by their personal power and conscience, assuming that 'nature' precludes mutually beneficial social relationships. From this shared premise, social contract theorists aim to demonstrate why rational individuals would voluntarily relinquish their natural freedom in exchange for the benefits of political order.

== Philosophical traditions ==
Broadly speaking, social contract theories share a number of common components, the purpose of which are generally to establish the political and legal basis of a legitimate state. First, a social contract theory usually begins with a counterfactual scenario where a population is not subject to any political authority. The purpose of this counterfactual is to identify the defects of anarchy, that is, where there is no state or law, and to establish the authority of the sovereign as based in the remedying of these defects. The counterfactual is termed the state of nature by Thomas Hobbes and the original position by John Rawls.

Second, it is posited that, within this counterfactual individuals will consider various arguments that would prompt them to submit to a sovereign. For example, according to Hobbes, without the existence of such sovereign, a population would devolve into war. In their deliberation, they will decide upon a social contract, encompassing rules, standards, or institutions, among themselves.

Third, following the enactment of this social contract, the hypothetical individuals intend that the real (non-hypothetical) individuals are to be guided by the contract in their interactions with each other. Social contract theorists hold that, to the extent that those same reasons apply to individuals in the real world, real individuals will only obey the terms of the social contract as arrived at in the counterfactual. That is to say, inasmuch as real individuals share the reasons that the hypothetical individuals had when they theorised the authority of the state, they will endorse and obey those rules.

=== Hobbesian ===
Hobbes theorised that individuals in the state of nature would come together and cede some of their individual rights, in exchange for others ceding theirs. For example, one would agree not to use force against another, and the latter would in turn agree not to use force against the former. This agreement is the social contract, and it irrevocably results in the creation of a sovereign state, which is to create laws to regulate social interactions in order to prevent violent conflicts and guarantee peace. By comparing life under a political regime to the anarchic state of nature, Hobbes aims to provide a theoretical basis for understanding the authority of government.

For the state not to be anarchic, Hobbes argues that there must be a sovereign ruler, which Hobbes compares to the biblical Leviathan, an entity with absolute authority over life and death. Without the terror of such a powerful ruler, humans would not obey the law, and they would not obey the reciprocal golden rule, "doing to others, as wee would be done to".

Just like in the state of nature of individuals, without a system of law amongst sovereign states, states are bound to be in conflict because there was no sovereign, over and above the state, which was more powerful and capable of imposing some system such on every state by force. Hobbes' work later inspired realist theories of international relations, which consider the basic unit of analysis to be states with no overarching higher authority.

==== Humean criticism ====
An early critic of social contract theory was the philosopher David Hume, who in 1742 published an essay in two parts: "Of Civil Liberty" and "Of the Original Contract". Hume launched two broad criticisms of Hobbes's theory: Firstly, although Hume agreed that consent of the governed was an important part of a legitimate state, he noted that the state of nature counterfactual was ultimately a historically fictitious one (II.XII.1). Hobbes did not disagree with this, regarding the historical basis of sovereign states typically as arising from a 'commonwealth by acquisition' and through force. However, Hume's objection was, more fundamentally, that the historical inaccuracy of the social contract theory renders it not useful in explaining the actual "foundation of government", when as Hume notes, there are actual historical grounds that can be investigated to explain this foundation (II.XII.20).

=== Lockean ===
John Locke believed that individuals in a state of nature would be bound morally, by the Law of Nature, in which man has the "power... to preserve his property; that is, his life, liberty and estate against the injuries and attempts of other men". In The Second Treatise of Government (1689), he asserted that "the state of Nature (...)" teaches all mankind who will but consult it, that being all equal and independent, no one ought to harm another in his life, health, liberty or of his possessions.

Without government to defend them against those seeking to injure or enslave them, Locke further believed people would have no security in their rights and would live in fear. Individuals, to Locke, would only agree to form a state that would provide, in part, a "neutral judge", acting to protect the lives, liberty, and property of those who lived within it.

In Locke's theory of the state, the government, as an impartial judge, may use the collective force of the populace to administer and enforce the law, rather than have each man acting as his own judge, jury, and executioner—the condition in the state of nature. While Hobbes argued for near-absolute authority, Locke argued for inviolate freedom under law in his Second Treatise of Government. Locke argued that a government's legitimacy comes from the citizens' delegation to the government of their absolute right of violence, though reserving the inalienable right of self-defense or "self-preservation". According to Locke, if a state were to attempt to violate the fundamental rights of the people, they enter "into a state of war with the people, who are thereupon absolved from any farther obedience and gain the right to resume their original liberty."

==== Reception in the United States ====
Locke's idea that everyone has the right to 'life, liberty, and property' inspired the Declaration of Independence (1776) of the United States of America, particularly in the phrase "life, liberty, and the pursuit of happiness." Indeed, Thomas Jefferson, one of the main authors of the Declaration, wrote in an 1825 letter that "Locke," along with figures such as "Aristotle, Cicero, (...) [and] Sidney," served as great intellectual foundations for the Declaration, as the text's "authority rests then on the harmonising sentiments" of these writers.

=== Rousseau ===
Jean-Jacques Rousseau's contractarian theory differed from both Hobbes and Locke. Rousseau challenges Hobbes's central thesis by observing that, if individuals are unrestrained in the state of nature and if interactions with others are as violent as Hobbes claims, then self-isolation would be the available and attractive choice. Thus, Hobbes's comparison between the state of nature and a civil state cannot, according to Rousseau, establish political authority, as this hypothetical pre-social state would not be a violent state of war; rather, Rousseau believed that the state of nature was, in fact, a peaceful, asocial state of solitary wanderers, a state of isolation that would not look at all like a state of war.

Rousseau's theory is rooted in his conception of the "general will", that is, is the power of all the citizens' collective interest: Rousseau did not believe in any form of representative government; rather, he thought that society was only legitimate when the sovereign (i.e. the "general will") were the sole legislators. He also stated that the individual must accept "the total alienation to the whole community of each associate with all his rights". Rousseau believed that for the social contract to work, individuals must forfeit their rights to the whole so that such conditions were "equal for all", with "each member as an indivisible part of the whole" as citizens of a common state directed by the general will.

Rousseau argued that the law is upheld by the collective will of the citizens whom they represent. Thus, in obeying laws, the citizen "remains free." Through elections, the general will becomes the will of the state, legitimizing absolutely a democratic government's authority, barring corruption. According to Rousseau, since the indivisible and inalienable popular sovereignty decides what is good for the whole, if an individual disobeys the law —rejecting this "civil liberty" in place of "natural liberty" and self interest — he will be held to what was decided when the people acted as a collective. Thus, the law, inasmuch as it is created by the people acting as a body, is not a limitation of individual freedom, but rather its expression. The individual, as a member of a collective, explicitly agreed to be constrained if, as a private individual, he did not respect his own will as formulated in the general will:

Indeed, Rousseau regarded the exercise of public power as "not an advantage, but a burdensome charge", believing that the rule of law was paramount over all administrative power "which cannot justly be imposed on one individual rather than the other". In this regard, Rousseau also believed that, ceteris paribus, "there is no particular application to alter the universality of the law". Because laws represent the restraint of "natural liberty", they represent the leap made from humans in the state of nature into civil society. In this sense, the law is a civilizing force. Rousseau, thus, further believed that the laws that govern a people help to mould their character. He further viewed the law as acting in a way that mitigates risks for all citizens, in a way akin to modern insurance.

=== Rawlsian ===
Building on the contractualist work of Immanuel Kant with, its presumption of limits on the state, John Rawls (1921–2002), in A Theory of Justice (1971), proposed a contractarian approach whereby rational people in a hypothetical "original position" would set aside their individual preferences and capacities under a "veil of ignorance" and agree to certain general principles of justice and legal organization. Within this veil, agents place themselves hypothetically into an ahistorical, idealized, moral decision situation, adopting an external point of view for the determination of principles of justice. Once selected, these principles would be implemented by the basic institutions of society, following which, the agents would not need to consider further basic questions of justice, but would be expected simply to follow the institutional demands of society.

=== Nozickian ===
Robert Nozick (1938–2002), in response to Rawls's theory of justice, devised an alternative, American libertarian approach toward the social contract in his Anarchy, State, and Utopia.

=== Other models ===
==== Pierre-Joseph Proudhon's individualist social contract (1851) ====
While Rousseau's social contract is based on popular sovereignty and not on individual sovereignty, there are other theories espoused by individualists, libertarians, and anarchists that do not involve agreeing to anything more than negative rights and creates only a limited state, if any.

Pierre-Joseph Proudhon (1809–1865) advocated a conception of social contract that did not involve an individual surrendering sovereignty to others. According to him, the social contract was not between individuals and the state, but rather among individuals who refrain from coercing or governing each other, each one maintaining complete sovereignty upon him- or herself:

What really is the Social Contract? An agreement of the citizen with the government? No, that would mean but the continuation of [Rousseau's] idea. The social contract is an agreement of man with man; an agreement from which must result what we call society. In this, the notion of commutative justice, first brought forward by the primitive fact of exchange, ... is substituted for that of distributive justice ... Translating these words, contract, commutative justice, which are the language of the law, into the language of business, and you have commerce, that is to say, in its highest significance, the act by which man and man declare themselves essentially producers, and abdicate all pretension to govern each other.

— Pierre-Joseph Proudhon, General Idea of the Revolution in the Nineteenth Century (1851)

==== David Gauthier's Morals by Agreement (1986) ====
David Gauthier's "neo-Hobbesian" theory argues that cooperation between two independent and self-interested parties is indeed possible, especially when it comes to understanding morality and politics. Gauthier notably points out the advantages of cooperation between two parties when it comes to the challenge of the prisoner's dilemma. He proposes that, if two parties were to stick to the original agreed-upon arrangement and morals outlined by the contract, they would both experience an optimal result. In his model for the social contract, factors including trust, rationality, and self-interest keep each party honest and dissuade them from breaking the rules.

==== Philip Pettit's Republicanism (1997) ====
Philip Pettit has argued, in Republicanism: A Theory of Freedom and Government (1997), that the theory of social contract, classically based on the consent of the governed, should be modified. Instead of arguing for explicit consent, which can always be manufactured, Pettit argues that the absence of an effective rebellion against it is a contract's only legitimacy.

== Alternative theories of state ==
=== Hume's conventionalism ===
Hume's own political theory held that human beings are morally sensible by nature—possessing 'natural virtues', benevolence, and a sensitivity to the needs of others—despite being guided by instrumental rationality and self-interest. Hume, nonetheless, observes that such sensitivity alone is insufficient for establishing a well-functioning society, and that 'artificial virtues' must manifest themselves to regulate social interaction. Unlike Hobbes, Hume believes that conventions evolve over time from a combination of self-interest and the understanding that, under moderate scarcity of resources and rough natural equality, reciprocal behavior is likely to be mutually beneficial. According to Hume:

Two men, who pull the oars of a boat, do it by an agreement or convention, tho' they have never given promises to each other.

Thus, Hume's historical and political conception of the modern state and legal system allows agents to gradually leave the state of nature to the extent that they learn to trust each other and develop mutual expectations. The emergence of trust among agents rebuts Hobbes's view that an absolute sovereign is required for establishing social order and political authority.

In order to explain obedience to the law, Hume explains the continued adherence of agents to existing conventions by stressing that agents typically will realize that their private good is intimately linked with the public good, especially expressed in the form of a functioning social order. Moreover, he maintains that agents' "sympathy" with each other motivates compliance with established conventions. He also argues that over time, agents will start to value the existing conventions intrinsically. They will follow the conventions not merely for instrumental reasons but will internalize their demands by developing a moral sense that corresponds to and approves of the conventions.

For Hume, convention is "a sense of common interest; which sense each man feels in his own breast, which he remarks in his fellows, and which carries him, in concurrence with others into a general plan or system of actions, which tends to public utility".

== Formal models ==
Game-theoretic approaches to justice and the social contract have been increasingly popular in contemporary moral and political philosophy.

=== Presocial position ===
Ken Binmore models the problem to be solved by the social contract as that of selecting a Pareto optimal equilibrium in a Nash demand game. From behind a veil of ignorance, just choices are to be selected disinterestedly. Following Harsanyi, the expected utility maximizing choice would be the utilitarian solution to the game. Binmore's strict Nash equilibrium involves a Pareto frontier, such that if a player were to demand less, he would get less; but if he were to demand more, demands would be incompatible and no one would get anything.

As an alternative to the state of nature concept, Vanderschraaf proposes an alternative called the "Generic Circumstances of Justice," which set formal constraints on the possible conventions that can make up the substance of justice, and which determine that:

parties have the right background conditions for justice when (i) they have available to them a variety of conventions over which their preferences differ to some extent, (ii) they can by working together generate a cooperative surplus characterized by some of these conventions, but (iii) each is also vulnerable to being taken advantage of by others who aim for outcomes better for themselves that result in their fellow parties suffering relative losses.

Within the "state of nature" bargaining process, Vanderschraaf further establishes norms of justice. Vanderschraaf considers fair division in a bargaining problem as a canonical equilibrium selection problem and model of justice, further including both evolutionary and learning dynamics in his bargaining model. He is thus able to reach the conclusion that the egalitarian bargaining solution is the most likely to emerge. This, however, is predicated on an account of the possibility of interpersonal utility comparisons and the acceptance of the "Baseline Consistency criterion" that, according to Vanderschraaf, allows agents to make "seamless" transitions if the cooperative surplus contracts or expands over time. Nonetheless, accepting these assumptions, Vanderschraaf synthesises his theory as such:

Rejecting positive offers perceived as too lopsided in Ultimatum games and punishing defectors at a personal cost in public good games are explainable as products of an evolved tendency in our species to treat others fairly and to punish those who fail to do far beyond laboratory settings. A general requirement to "play fair" is deeply rooted in the natural law tradition from antiquity. A number of the great figures in both the classical and the modern natural law traditions maintain that requirements of the natural law follow from some version of the Golden Rule. These natural law requirements correspond to the principle "Do unto others as you would have them do unto you," since they require one to act for the benefit of others, possibly at some personal cost.

=== Social conventions as equilibria ===
The American philosopher David Lewis defined a social convention within the context of a game theoretic model of social interactions, particularly of coordination games. According to Lewis, conventions are game-theoretic strategies that solve coordination problems (i.e. problems that arise when individuals need to coordinate their actions to complete a task or to make a decision, but neither is prior communication possible nor is there an external force or central authority to impose order). For Lewis, a convention is arbitrary (in that there could be some other convention that would work equally well to solve the problem) and self-reinforcing (in that the fact that other individuals obey it gives one a rational reason to follow suit without any prior agreement or external enforcement). Formally, Lewis regards a convention as a kind of strict Nash equilibrium, such that in a given game, although there are multiple potential conventions that could comprise equilibria, a convention is nonetheless maintained because any unilateral deviation would make the player strictly worse off. Lewis's model rests on the assumption that conventions are the product of a one-shot coordination game in which players independently arrive at a solution.

Building on this view, Peter Vanderschraaf's conception of game theoretic conventionalism can be broken into three parts: Firstly, an equilibrium is a convention if it is a correlated equilibrium of the game; secondly, there is more than one such correlated equilibrium, which correlates to what he terms "discretionary sense arbitrariness"; thirdly, both of these characteristics are common knowledge to the agents. On the first part, Vanderschraaf links conventions to the notion of Robert Aumann's correlated equilibrium (i.e. in correlated equilibria, players may condition their behavior on some external random feature of their environment), arguing that conventions are not merely the Nash equilibria of the underlying games but are best understood in the context of a super-game of the original base game wherein agents coordinate their strategies based on some external mechanism.

Vanderschraaf also applies the equilibrium-in-conjectures approach to understanding why agents might employ mixed strategies. Instead of regarding each agent's Nash mixed strategies as probabilistically independent of one another and drawn solely from their common knowledge of the game structure and payoffs, Vanderschraaf suggests that, in the context of justice, a wider conception of conventions is required that relies on correlated, prospective, and retrospective assessments by the players, as justice relies not only on predictions of future behavior but also on evidence from past behavior (e.g., involving reciprocity). With "this definition, it is possible for a convention to be characterized by equilibria of indefinitely repeated games even where the profile of actions this convention prescribes in a given interaction period is not an equilibrium of the base game."

=== Exit options ===
Binmore provides room in the model for ex post opting out of the solution by introducing the possibility of any individual at any time calling to renegotiate the social contract. In this extended game, a utilitarian solution may not be a Nash equilibrium.

=== Justice as convention ===
In other words, fairness in terms of roughly equal division is the baseline norm of justice that is most likely to develop and survive over time. Vanderschraaf agrees with Hume and Hobbes that a government is needed to establish and secure justice, even though he believes that (at least some of) the norms of justice are what one might call "natural conventions". His specific view is that that a Humean governing convention between the rulers and the ruled can be stable over time and that there is good reason (though not decisive) for the ruled to select a democratic over a non-democratic sovereign.

To Vanderschraaf, justice is a convention characterized by fairness and amenable to stabilization by a conventional government, a theory of "justice as mutual advantage" theory, where the content of justice is defined by "[c]onventions that share out the benefits and the burdens of life in society," and agents are motivated to follow those conventions because doing so serves their "own interests" on condition that they expect "others to obey as well."

== History ==
Although the antecedents of social contract theory are found in antiquity, in Greek and Stoic philosophy and Roman and Canon Law, the heyday of the social contract was the mid-17th to early 19th centuries, when it emerged as the leading doctrine of political legitimacy.

In Western philosophy, the concept of the social contract was described by Plato in The Republic, Book II:

When men have both done and suffered injustice and have had experience of both, not being able to avoid the one and obtain the other, they think that they had better agree among themselves to have neither; hence there arise laws and mutual covenants; and that which is ordained by law is termed by them lawful and just. This they affirm to be the origin and nature of justice;—it is a mean or compromise, between the best of all, which is to do injustice and not be punished, and the worst of all, which is to suffer injustice without the power of retaliation; and justice, being at a middle point between the two, is tolerated not as a good, but as the lesser evil, and honoured by reason of the inability of men to do injustice. For no man who is worthy to be called a man would ever submit to such an agreement if he were able to resist.

Epicurus, in the fourth century BC, also notes, in his Principal Doctrines:

31. Natural justice is a pledge of reciprocal benefit, to prevent one man from harming or being harmed by another.

32. Those animals which are incapable of making binding agreements with one another not to inflict nor suffer harm are without either justice or injustice; and likewise for those peoples who either could not or would not form binding agreements not to inflict nor suffer harm.

33. There never was such a thing as absolute justice, but only agreements made in mutual dealings among men in whatever places at various times providing against the infliction or suffering of harm.

=== Renaissance developments ===
The first modern philosopher to articulate a detailed contract theory was Thomas Hobbes (1588–1679) in his Leviathan (1651). Later, John Locke's conception of the social contract differed from Hobbes' in several fundamental ways, retaining only the central notion that individuals in a state of nature would willingly come together to form a state. Jean-Jacques Rousseau (1712–1778), in his influential 1762 treatise The Social Contract, outlined a different version of social-contract theory, as the foundations of society based on the sovereignty of the "general will".

Prominent 17th- and 18th-century theorists of the social contract and natural rights included Hugo de Groot (1625), Thomas Hobbes (1651), Samuel von Pufendorf (1673), John Locke (1689), Jean-Jacques Rousseau (1762) and Immanuel Kant (1797), each approaching the concept of political authority differently. Grotius posited that individual humans had natural rights. Hobbes famously said that in a "state of nature", human life would be "solitary, poor, nasty, brutish and short". In the absence of political order and law, everyone would have unlimited natural freedoms, including the "right to all things" and thus the freedom to plunder, rape and murder. There would be an endless "war of all against all" (bellum omnium contra omnes). To avoid this, free men contract with each other to establish political community (civil society) through a social contract in which they all gain security in return for subjecting themselves to an absolute sovereign, one man or an assembly of men. Though the sovereign's edicts may well be arbitrary and tyrannical, Hobbes saw absolute government as the only alternative to the terrifying anarchy of a state of nature. Hobbes asserted that humans consent to abdicate their rights in favor of the absolute authority of government (whether monarchical or parliamentary).

Quentin Skinner has also argued that several critical modern innovations in contract theory are found in the writings from French Calvinists and Huguenots, whose work in turn was invoked by writers in the Low Countries who objected to their subjection to Spain and, later still, by Catholics in England.

=== Contemporary applications ===
The social contract can be used as a theoretical object to analyse the capacity for a population to accept change, upon which the change exerts 'pressure'. In an analysis of the consequences of the Gulf Cooperation Council states changing energy prices, the social contract defines the capacity for change. Higher energy prices for resident households can have an adverse impact, meaning that the consent of the participants in the contract needs to be maintained, because before energy price increases, prices for residents were kept low by charging higher prices for exported oil.

== Criticism ==
=== Natural law and constitutionalism ===
The legal scholar Randy Barnett has argued that, while presence in the territory of a society may be necessary for consent, this does not constitute consent to all rules the society might make regardless of their content. A second condition of consent is that the rules be consistent with underlying principles of justice and the protection of natural and social rights, and have procedures for effective protection of those rights (or liberties). This has also been discussed by O. A. Brownson, who argued that, in a sense, three "constitutions" are involved: first, the constitution of nature that includes all of what the Founders called "natural law"; second, the constitution of society, an unwritten and commonly understood set of rules for the society formed by a social contract before it establishes a government, by which it does establish the third, a constitution of government. To consent, a necessary condition is that the rules be constitutional in that sense.

=== Tacit consent ===
The theory of a tacit social contract holds that by remaining in the territory controlled by some society, which usually has a government, people give consent to join that society and be governed by its government if any. This consent is what gives legitimacy to such a government. Other writers have argued that consent to join the society is not necessarily consent to its government. For that, the government must be set up according to a constitution of government that is consistent with the superior unwritten constitutions of nature and society.

=== Contracts must be consensual ===
According to the will theory of contract, a contract is not presumed valid unless all parties voluntarily agree to it, either tacitly or explicitly, without coercion. Lysander Spooner, a 19th-century lawyer who argued before the Supreme Court of the United States and a staunch supporter of a right of contract between individuals, argued in his essay No Treason that a supposed social contract cannot be used to justify governmental actions such as taxation because government will initiate force against anyone who does not wish to enter into such a contract. As a result, he maintains that such an agreement is not voluntary and therefore cannot be considered a legitimate contract at all. As an abolitionist, he made similar arguments about the unconstitutionality of slavery in the US.

=== Individuals are not better off under states ===
In their book Prehistoric Myths in Modern Political Philosophy, the philosopher Karl Widerquist and anthropologist Grant McCall criticise social contract theory on the grounds that not all individuals are better off than they could reasonably expect to be in the state of nature, thereby removing the justification for giving up liberty in exchange for welfare.

== See also ==
- Consent
- Consent theory
- Contract
- Mandate (politics)
- Organic crisis
- Right of rebellion
- Self determination
- Social capital
- Social cohesion
- Social Contract (Britain) – 1970s British Labour Party policy involving trade-offs between employment conditions and social welfare
- Social disintegration
- Social rights (social contract theory)
- Social solidarity
- Societal collapse
- Sovereign citizen movement

=== Constitutional frameworks ===
- Classical republicanism
- Federalism
- Ordered Liberty
- Rule of law

=== Texts, moral philosophy, and critiques ===
- Lawrence Kohlberg's stages of moral development
- The Racial Contract
- Rights of Man
- Social Justice in the Liberal State

=== Other contracts and early-modern political theology ===
- Henrician Articles – Contract between the King of Poland and Polish nobility
- Mandate of Heaven – Political doctrine of divine legitimacy in China
- Mayflower Compact – First governing document of Plymouth Colony
- Monarchomachs – French Huguenot theorists who opposed monarchy at the end of the 16th century
- National Pact – Lebanese confessionalist agreement
- School of Salamanca – Spanish Scholastic intellectual movement
