= Andrew Laties =

American writer and bookseller

Andrew Laties is an American writer and bookseller born in Baltimore, Maryland.

Laties has written for a variety of websites and magazines He also maintains a personal blog.

In 2005 Vox Pop published his IPPY Award-winning book Rebel Bookseller: How To Improvise Your Own Indie Store And Beat Back The Chains. Vox Pop was an independent publisher and a well-known local café in Brooklyn, New York with which Laties was intimately involved. As of September 8, 2010, however, Vox Pop was forced to close its doors.

A second edition entitled Rebel Bookseller: Why Indie Businesses Represent Everything You Want to Fight for—from Free Speech to Buying Local to Building Communities came out in July 2011 from Seven Stories Press.

In addition to his writing, Laties has spoken on the current state of independent publishing. Most recently he presented a lecture titled "Indie Bookstores Still Count: What We Can Do For Publishers, and What Publishers Can Do For Us" at the Digital Book World 2011 conference.

Laties is the founding manager of the Eric Carle Museum Bookshop in Amherst, Massachusetts. Previously, in Chicago, Illinois, Laties co-founded The Children's Bookstore (1985–1996), which received the 1987 WNBA Pannell Award for Excellence in Children's Bookselling. He then created The Children's Museum Store (1994–2002).

Laties with his life and artistic partner Rebecca Migdal is the proprietor of Book & Puppet a bookstore and performance venue on Northampton Street in Easton, Pennsylvania which opened in its first incarnation in the city in 2017. Book and Puppet opened a new and eventually exclusive location on Center Square in Easton in 2019.

== Bibliography ==
- Rebel Bookseller: Why Indie Businesses Represent Everything You Want To Fight for, from Free Speech To Buying Local To Building Communities (2011)
