= Mexican Law Review =

- Discipline: Law review
- Language: English
- Edited by: John Ackerman

Publication details
- History: 2004–present
- Publisher: National Autonomous University of Mexico (Mexico)
- Frequency: Biannual
- Open access: Yes
- License: CC BY-NC 4.0

Standard abbreviations
- ISO 4: Mex. Law Rev.

Indexing
- ISSN: 1870-0578
- OCLC no.: 300631837

Links
- Journal homepage

The Mexican Law Review is a bi-annual peer reviewed law journal published by the Institute for Legal Research (Instituto de Investigaciones Jurídicas) of the National Autonomous University of Mexico. The institute has been described as the foremost legal institute in Mexico and Latin America. It was established in 2008 and the editor-in-chief is John Ackerman.

== See also ==
- Law of Mexico
