= Fred A. Wilcox =

Fred A. Wilcox is a retired associate professor in the writing department at Ithaca College. He is the author of six books on issues including the Vietnam War, nuclear power, and the Plowshares Movement. Two of his books discuss the effects of Agent Orange, a defoliant used extensively during the war.

== Life and career ==
Wilcox was born in Des Moines, Iowa. He graduated from the University of Iowa where he studied Sociology and English. He earned an MFA from the Iowa Writers' Workshop and a doctorate in English and Expository Writing from SUNY Albany.

== Books on Agent Orange ==
His first book on the subject, Waiting for an Army to Die (ISBN 978-0932020680), recounts the effects of the chemical defoliant Agent Orange on US troops during and after the Vietnam War. The chemical was used to eliminate the dense foliage of the forests in Vietnam, which the US military believed provided cover to enemy fighters. Wilcox follows the lives of US veterans who argue that the chemical was toxic, citing health conditions including cancer and fetal deformations. The book helped bring to light the issue of Agent Orange in the United States when it was first published in 1983.

Jon W. Mitchell wrote in The Asia-Pacific Journal: Japan Focus: "In 1989, Fred A. Wilcox chronicled the struggles that US veterans faced in receiving recognition for their exposure to Agent Orange during the Vietnam War in the book Waiting For An Army to Die. Twenty-two years later, the title still encapsulates the attitude adopted by the Pentagon and the VA towards former service members citing exposure to dioxins on Okinawa." George Claxton, Chair Emeritus of the National Agent Orange/Dioxin Committee of Vietnam Veterans of America, wrote in a book review in Agent Orange Zone, "In the past thirty three years I have read every book published on the tragedy of Agent Orange and dioxin. Beyond a doubt, Scorched Earth ... is one of the most informative works of truth released on the market."

In 2011 Wilcox published Scorched Earth (ISBN 978-1609801380), a continuation of the issues he addressed in Waiting for an Army to Die. In it he examines the effects of Agent Orange on the Vietnamese people and their natural environment. Wilcox traveled with his son, Brendan Wilcox, whose photos accompany Wilcox's text, to Vietnam to interview individuals and families suffering from many health issues related to Agent Orange exposure. The conditions include Hodgkin's lymphoma, chloracne, severe birth-defects and various types of cancer, among others.

About the book, Evaggelos Vallianatos wrote in The World Post (a partnership of The Huffington Post and Berggruen Institute on Governance,"It is eloquent, thought provoking, absorbing, daring, moral, and necessary. It is a jolt to historical amnesia. It tells what chemical warfare did to Vietnam -- and, to a lesser degree, America."

== Books on peace and activism ==
Wilcox's 1991 book Uncommon Martyrs: The Plowshares Movement and the Catholic Left is a portrait of some of the primary figures in the movement named from the biblical command to "beat swords into plowshares." Led by radical priests Philip and Daniel Berrigan, it included many well-known Catholic peace activists who engaged in many acts of civil disobedience in their attempts to stop the Vietnam War.

Wilcox cowrote Fighting the Lamb's War, (ISBN 1-56751-101-5) the autobiography of Philip Berrigan, published in 1996.

== Other works ==
Wilcox is also the author of a novel, Secrets, a memoir, Chasing Shadows: Memoirs of a Sixties Survivor, and shorter essays and nonfiction works.

== Books ==
=== Written by Wilcox ===
- Waiting for an Army to Die: The Tragedy of Agent Orange (Random House 1983, Seven Stories Press 2011)
- Uncommon Martyrs (Addison-Wesley 1991)
- Chasing Shadows: Memoirs of a Sixties Survivor (The Permanent Press 1996)
- Fighting the Lamb's War: Skirmishes with the American Empire (the autobiography of Philip Berrigan) (Common Courage Press 1996)
- Scorched Earth: Legacies of Chemical Warfare in Vietnam (Seven Stories Press 2011)
- Secrets (Split Oak Press 2012)

=== Edited by Wilcox ===
- Grass Roots: An Anti-Nuke Source Book (Crossing Press 1982)
- Disciples & Dissidents (Haleys 2000)
