= Martha Long =

- Born: 1950s Dublin, Ireland
- Writing career
- Notable work: The Ma... series
- Website: marthalong.wordpress.com

Martha Long is an Irish author best known for the 'Ma...' series.

== Career ==
Her bestselling autobiographical series, the Ma... series, recount a personal history of abuse, depravation and cruelty – from early life into adulthood. The first book, Ma, He Sold Me For a Few Cigarettes, attained Irish bestseller status in 2007. Subsequent books in the series also reached number one in the Irish Times bestseller list. Long is published by Mainstream Publishing, an associate of Random House in the UK and by Seven Stories Press in the US.

=== Works ===
The Ma... series

- Ma, He Sold Me for a Few Cigarettes (Mainstream, Edinburgh, 2007) (Seven Stories Press, U.S., 2012)
- Ma, I’m Gettin Meself a New Mammy (Mainstream, Edinburgh, 2008) (Seven Stories Press, U.S., 2015)
- Ma, It's a Cold Aul Night an I’m Lookin for a Bed (Mainstream, Edinburgh, 2009) (Seven Stories Press, U.S., 2015)
- Ma, Now I'm Goin Up in the World (Mainstream, Edinburgh, 2010)
- Ma, I’ve Got Meself Locked Up in the Mad House (Mainstream, Edinburgh, 2011)
- Ma, I've Reached for the Moon an I'm Hittin the Stars (Mainstream, Edinburgh, 2012)
- Ma, Jackser's Dyin' Alone (Mainstream, Edinburgh, 2013)
- Run, Lily, Run (Mainstream, Edinburgh, 2016)
