= Cory Silverberg =

Canadian sex educator

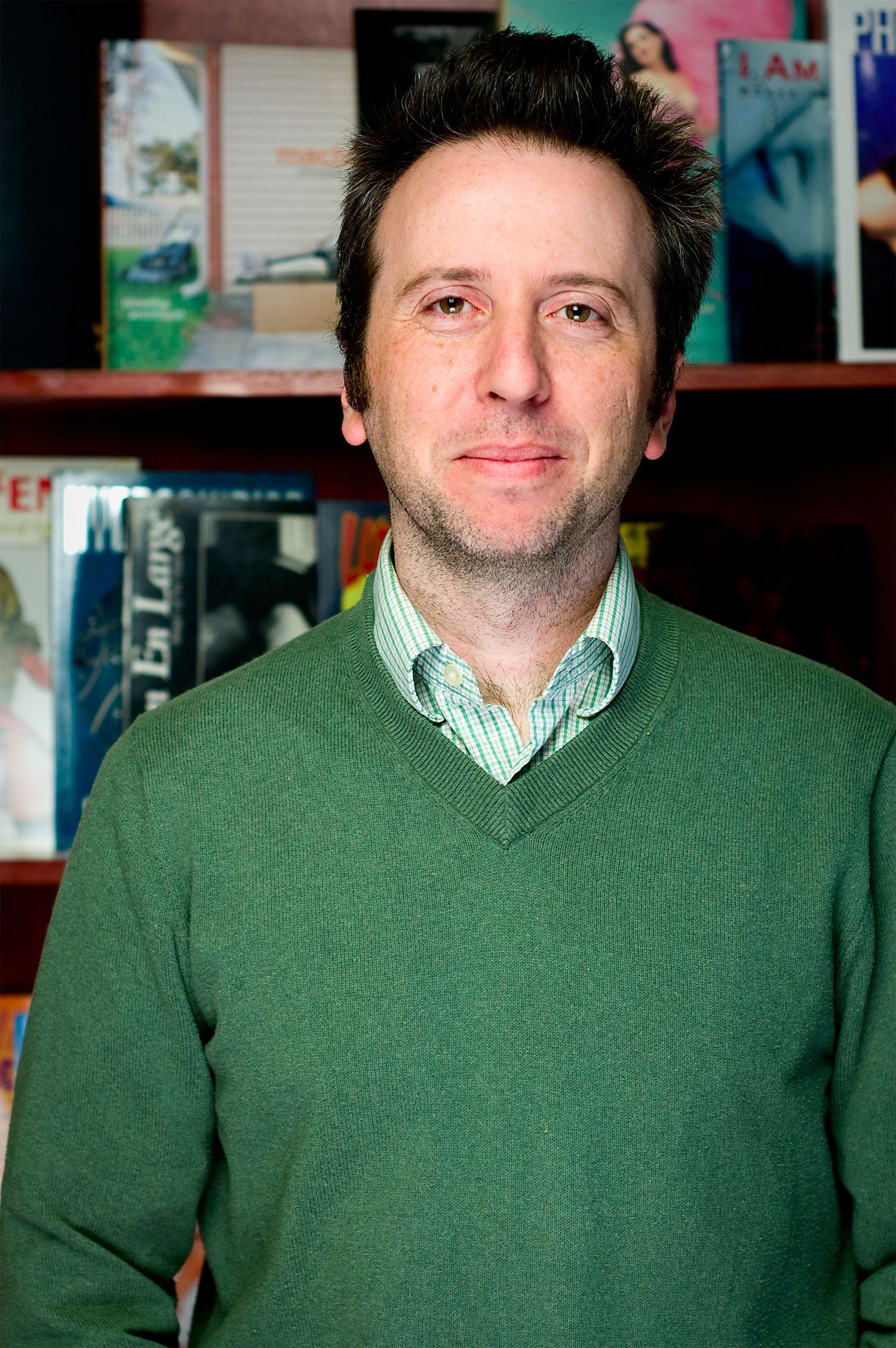
Cory Silverberg

Cory Silverberg is a Canadian sex educator, author, public speaker, blogger and founding member of Come As You Are.

Silverberg is Jewish, and grew up in a "middle class liberal Canadian home in the '70s." A certified sex educator and former chair of sexuality educator certification for the American Association of Sexuality Educators, Counselors and Therapists, they teach on topics including sex and disability, sex and technology, and pleasure, inclusion, and access across North America. Silverberg is the co-author of the "Ultimate Guide to Sex and Disability" and was the Sexuality Guide for About.com.

Silverberg's first children's book What Makes a Baby was the most funded children's book project on Kickstarter to date, and was released in 2012.

In May 2015, Seven Stories Press published Sex Is a Funny Word: A Book about Bodies, Feelings, and YOU, which Maria Popova described as a "candid, inclusive, stereotype-defying, and absolutely wonderful primer on sexuality and gender". Sex is a Funny Word, appeared on the American Library Association's Top 10 Most Challenged Books list for 2017 and as 20 on the Top 100 Most Frequently Challenged Books for 2010-2019. In Today's Parent, Tara-Michelle Ziniuk compared the colourful nonfiction book to a "literary Magic School Bus of sex ed".

In 2022, Silverberg's third sex education book You Know, Sex was published by Seven Stories Press.

Silverberg graduated from the Ontario Institute for Studies in Education, from which they received a master's of education. They identify as queer and use they/them pronouns.

== Books ==
- The Ultimate Guide to Sex and Disability (2003; OCLC 53021670)
- What Makes a Baby (2012; OCLC 826323398)
- Sex is a Funny Word (2015; OCLC 896806764)
- You Know, Sex (2022; OCLC 1260819934)

== Awards ==
- 2014 Lambda Literary Awards Finalist for What Makes a Baby in LGBT Children/Young Adult
- 2016 Stonewall Book Award Honor Book in Children's and Young Adult Literature for Sex is a Funny Word
- 2016 American Library Association Notable Children's Book Award for Sex is a Funny Word
- 2016 Norma Fleck Award for Canadian Children's Non-Fiction for Sex is a Funny Word
- 2016 Joe Shuster Award/ Canada's National Comic Book Award Nominee for Sex is a Funny Word
- 2016 Canadian Children's Book Centre's Best Books for Kids and Teens Award for Sex is a Funny Word
- 2016 Association for Library Service to Children Notable Book for Sex is a Funny Word
- 2016 Rainbow Book List for Sex is a Funny Word
