= Christopher R. Howard =

American novelist

Christopher R. Howard is an American novelist. He was a finalist for the 2008 National Magazine Award for fiction for his short story "How to Make Millions in the Oil Market" (McSweeneys). Howard's novella Darkstar, about a homeless Irish teenager who's haunted by a diabolical voice and seeks to reunite with a soulmate he hasn't seen since boyhood, as a cosmic event threatens to extinguish life on Earth, was selected by Amazon.com as one of the launch titles in its Kindle Singles program. His first book, Tea of Ulaanbaatar, about a Peace Corps mission to Ulaanbaatar, Mongolia, and a powerful "blood tea" known as tsus, was published in May 2011 by Seven Stories Press. It was named the best Small Press Wonder of 2011 by the Chicago Center for Literature and Photography. His second book, Prince of the World, was published by Seven Stories Press in 2013.

== Awards ==
- 2008 National Magazine Award (finalist)
- 2011 Small Press Wonder, Chicago Center for Literature and Photography
