= Ivana Bodrožić =

Croatian writer and poet

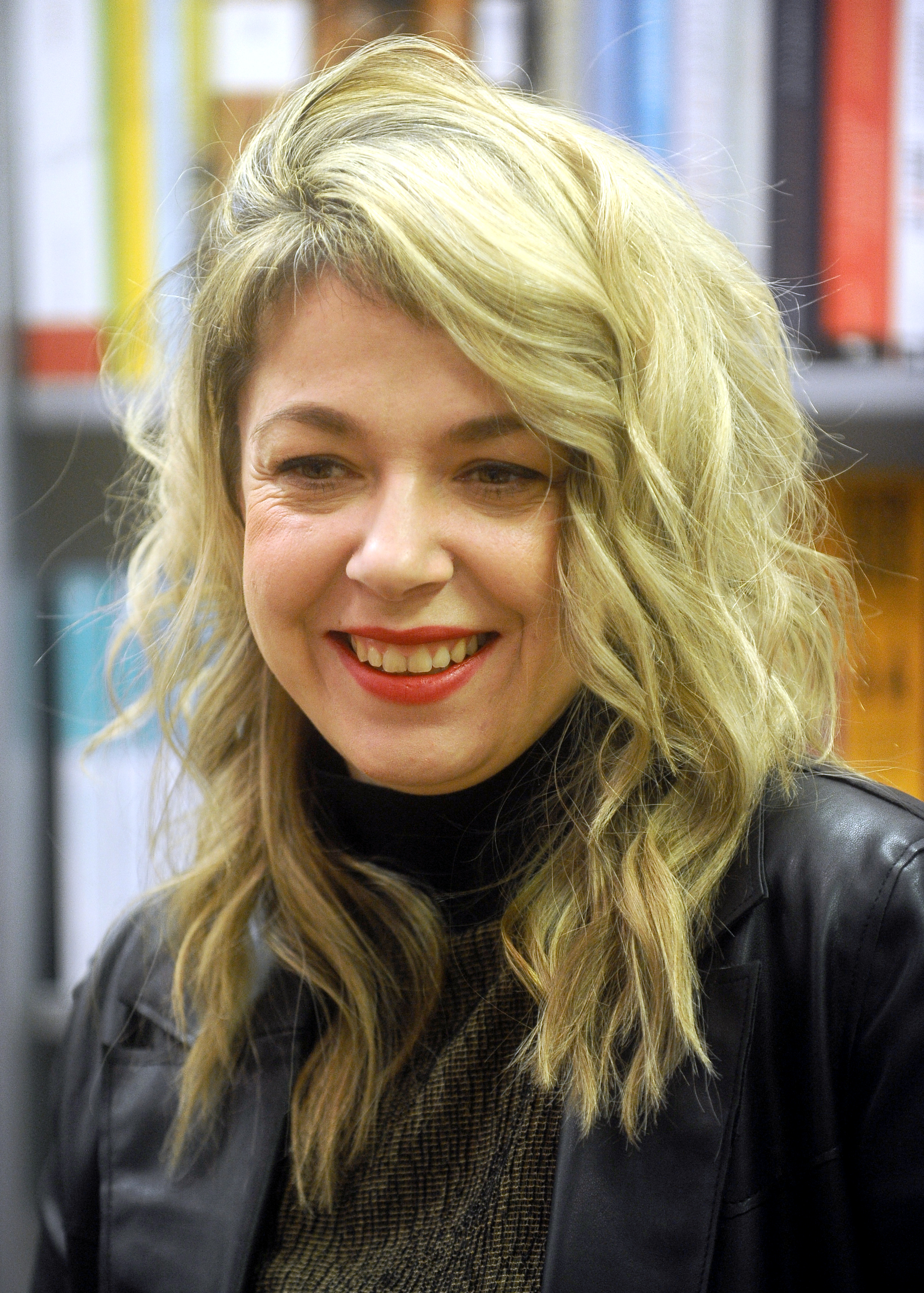
- Ivana Bodrožić in 2020
- Born: Ivana Bodrožić; 5 July 1982; Vukovar, SR Croatia, Yugoslavia
- Education: University of Zagreb
- Spouse: Roman Simić (div. 2016)

Ivana Bodrožić (born 5 July 1982) is a Croatian writer and poet.

== Biography ==
Ivana Bodrožić was born on 5 July 1982 in a Croatian town of Vukovar. She finished elementary school in her hometown and high school in Zagreb. Bodrožić graduated philosophy and Croatian studies at the University of Zagreb. During the Croatian War of Independence, her father Ante Bodrožić was killed in Vukovar massacre (he is officially still recognized as 'disappeared'), while she and her mother and brother fled occupied Vukovar and settled in Zagreb and Kumrovec as refugees.

She was awarded a distinguished literary prize Goran for Young Poets and Kvirin Award of Matica hrvatska for her poetry collection Prvi korak u tamu (First Step Into the Darkness), released in 2005. She published her poetry in various literary journals (Vijenac, Quorum, Poezija), and was also included in the anthology of contemporary Croatian poetry Utjeha kaosa (The Consolation of Chaos) by Miroslav Mićanović, as the youngest author. She was also included in the anthology of Damir Šodan, Drugom stranom (Walk on the Other Side). Her songs were translated into various European languages, while the translation of the complete collection of her poetry collection Prvi korak u tamu was published in Spanish.

Her novel Hotel Zagorje (published in 2010) was awarded the following awards: Josip and Ivan Kozarac (Charter of Success); Kočić's pen, Banja Luka – Belgrade (for outstanding achievements in contemporary literature); Cyclops – for the best screening work. In 2012, the German translation of the novel was published by Hanser publishing house Hanser, and in the French by Acte Sud. Noval was also published in Serbia, Slovenia, Czech Republic, Macedonia, Turkey and the Netherlands. The novel was published in English for the first time by Seven Stories Press as The Hotel Tito: A Novel in November, 2017. Bodrožić, together with award-winning Bosnian director Jasmila Žbanić, wrote a screenplay for the feature film. She also won Večernjak's "Ranko Marinković" (2nd place) for the best short story in 2011.

In 2017, Ivana Bodrožić has signed the Declaration on the Common Language of the Croats, Serbs, Bosniaks and Montenegrins.

In 2025 her novel Sons, daughters was longlisted for the International Dublin Literary Award.

== Works ==
- Prvi korak u tamu, zbirka poezije, SKUD Ivan Goran Kovačić, Zagreb, 2005. (Spanish edition: Primer paso a la oscuridad, Baile del Sol, Tenerife, 2011.)
- Hotel Zagorje, poluautobiografski roman, Profil multimedija, 2010 (Slovene: Hotel Zagorje, Modrijan, Ljubljana, 2011.; Serbian: Hotel Zagorje, Rende, Beograd, 2011.; French: Hôtel Z, Actes Sud, Arles, 2012.; German: Hotel Nirgendwo, Zsolnay Verlag, Vienna, 2012.; Macedonian: Hotel Zagorje, Magor, Skopje, 2012.; Czech: Hotel Zagorje, Paseka, Prague-Litomyšl, 2012.; Turkish: Hiçbir yer oteli, Aylak Adam, Istanbul, 2015.; Danish: Hotel Intetsteds, Tiderne Skifter, Kopenhagen, 2015.; Hungarian: Hotel Zagorje, Park Könyvkiadó, Budapest, 2019)
- Pričaj mi o tome (Tell Me About It), short story (published in Jutarnji list)
- Prijelaz za divlje životinje (Overpass for Wild Animals), VBZ, Zagreb, 2012.
- Za što sam se spremna potući (For What Am I Ready To Fight), Profil knjiga, Zagreb, 2013.
- 100 % pamuk (100% cotton), VBZ, Zagreb, 2014.
- Rupa (Hole), Naklada Ljevak-24sata, Zagreb, 2016.
- The Hotel Tito: A Novel (English translation of Hotel Zagorje) Seven Stories Press, New York, 2017.
- Sinovi, kćeri, Hermes naklada, Zagreb, 2020.
- Fikcija (Fiction), Fraktura, Zaprešić, 2005.
