= Come as You Are (sex shop) =

Sex shop in Toronto, Ontario, Canada

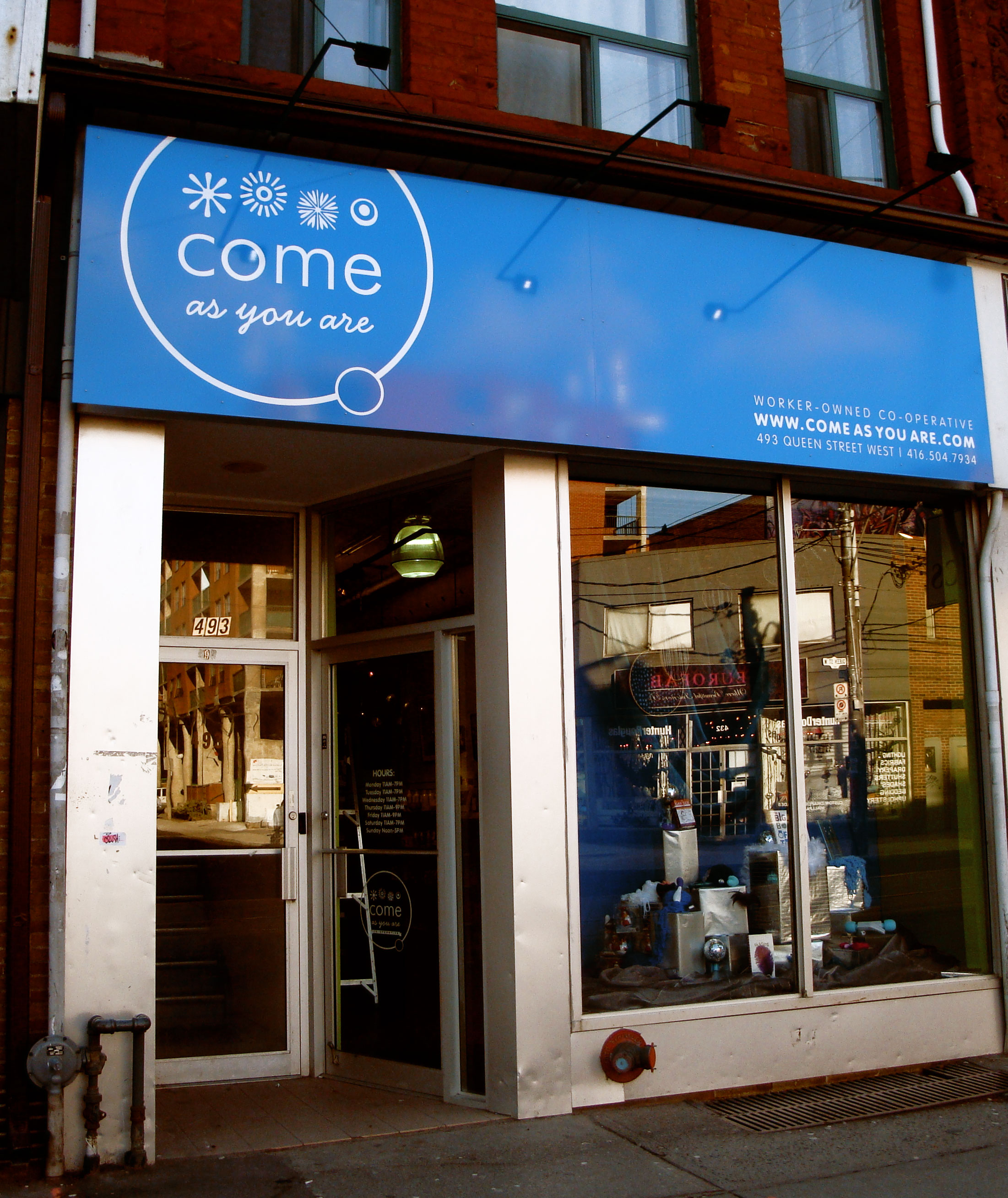
Come As You Are Co-operative's former location at 493 Queen St. West in 2011

Come As You Are is a sex-positive sex shop located in Toronto, Ontario, Canada. It was founded in 1997 by Cory Silverberg, Sandra Haar, and Carey Grey as a democratic worker-owner cooperative in the model of the American Good Vibrations.

== Overview ==
Come As You Are Co-operative has an educational and community-based mandate, to provide a store where people can access sex information and products. The sex shop has a focus on making sexuality products accessible for disabled people.. The co-op also provided Canada's only sex toy recycling program, and provides gender affirming gear via their GenderGear site.

Come As You Are has had multiple locations since their inception, including at 493 Queen St. West. In 2016, they closed their brick and mortar store and became online-only until fall 2020, when they moved to 254 Augusta Avenue in Kensington Market. In 2026, they moved to 464 College St., near the corner of College and Bathurst and kitty-corner to Sneaky Dee's.

== Education ==
Come As You Are offers sex education, health workshops by notable sex-positive authors and educators, including Susie Bright, Carol Queen, Emily Nagoski, and others. The co-op also provides education outreach workshops to local community groups and universities.

In 2013, Come As You Are won The Co-operators' National Co-op Challenge with a proposal to bring their educational outreach to communities across Canada.

== Recognition ==
Come As You Are has consistently been voted Toronto's best sex shop by the readers of Now Toronto and has been cited as Toronto's "most inclusive sex shop".
