= The Castle Cross the Magnet Carter =

2016 novel by Kia Corthron

- Author: Kia Corthron
- Language: English
- Genre: Historical fiction
- Publisher: Seven Stories Press
- Publication date: 26 January 2016
- Publication place: United States
- Media type: Print (hardback & paperback)
- Pages: 789
- ISBN: 978-1-60980-657-6

The Castle Cross the Magnet Carter is a 2016 novel by American playwright and author Kia Corthron. It won the 2016 Center for Fiction First Novel Prize.

== Plot ==
The novel chronicles the lives and interactions of two sets of brothers: Eliot and Dwight in Maryland, and B.J. and Randall in Alabama. It begins in 1941, jumps to the late 1950s, and concludes with the climactic events in 1983, followed by an epilogue in 2010.

== Development history ==
Corthron stated in a 2016 interview that she was inspired to begin the novel with the climactic event and drafted the novel in longhand. Upon starting the novel in 2010, she intended to have only one protagonist, but Corthron "realized [she] also wanted to know the story behind the other key person involved in the event ... and at last it became a book about brothers." Corthron, then known for her work as a playwright, said before the novel was published "[the idea] was just so huge I felt that this just couldn't fit into [a play,] a two-hour experience. Not necessarily more important, but just bigger."

So, while I have loved many of the characters of my plays, it did not go as deep as my feelings for my novel protagonists. As a matter of fact, I was completely taken unawares one day when I realized I was in love with one of the protagonists of my novel. I did not expect that, and it's never happened with a play! And those feelings manifested themselves not even halfway through the book – and got more intense as I kept writing!

— Kia Corthron, 2016 interview

The novel was composed mainly in chronological order and Corthron "obsessively wrote [the draft] all the time," as fast as a hundred pages per month, noting she completed three drafts before showing it to anyone else. She composed parts of the novel at numerous writers' retreats and workshops.

=== Publication history ===
The length of The Castle Cross the Magnet Carter caused several publishers to pass on the novel or suggest that it either receive major cuts or be broken into a trilogy; Corthron persisted until Seven Stories Press finally accepted the manuscript in September 2014. The original editor of the book at Seven Stories had resisted its publication, and Corthron believes the advocacy of another Seven Stories author, who brought the book to the primary editor at Seven Stories, was critical to its eventual publication. Corthron would cut 400 pages of the 1,200-page manuscript for final publication.

- — (January 26, 2016). The Castle Cross the Magnet Carter (1st hdbk. ed.). New York, New York: Seven Stories Press. ISBN 978-1-60980-657-6.
- — (January 26, 2016). The Castle Cross the Magnet Carter (ebook ed.). New York, New York: Seven Stories Press. ISBN 978-1-60980-658-3.
- — (November 14, 2017). The Castle Cross the Magnet Carter (1st pbk. ed.). New York, New York: Seven Stories Press. ISBN 978-1-60980-807-5.

== Reception ==
The novel received mixed reviews, with praise for its dialogue but criticism for its length. Publishers Weekly hailed the novel as echoing "the social conscience of Steinbeck, the epic sweep of Ferber, [and] the narrative quirks of Dos Passos." Leonard Pitts, reviewing for The New York Times, took issue with the length: "There is significant flab on these bones, sins of writerly self-indulgence and authorial indiscipline." Despite this, Pitts admired the novel's message: "... it succeeds admirably in a novel’s first and most difficult task: It makes you give a damn. It also does well by a novel’s second task: It sends you away pondering what it has to say." Naomi Wallace was quoted "[The novel] is the most important piece of writing about twentieth-century America since James Baldwin's Another Country."

Corthron read from the proof galleys of her novel in 2015 at an artist's residency and a fellow writer in residency, Cathy Davidson, was immediately reminded of "Faulkner. Morrison. Ismael Reed [sic]. I cannot wait to read this novel. [...] Breathtaking."

== Awards ==
The Castle Cross the Magnet Carter won the 2016 Center for Fiction First Novel Prize for best first novel.

== See also ==
- Kissing Case; a fictionalized version appears in the novel.
