= Irma Sandoval =

Mexican academic (born 1972)

Irma Sandoval Ballesteros
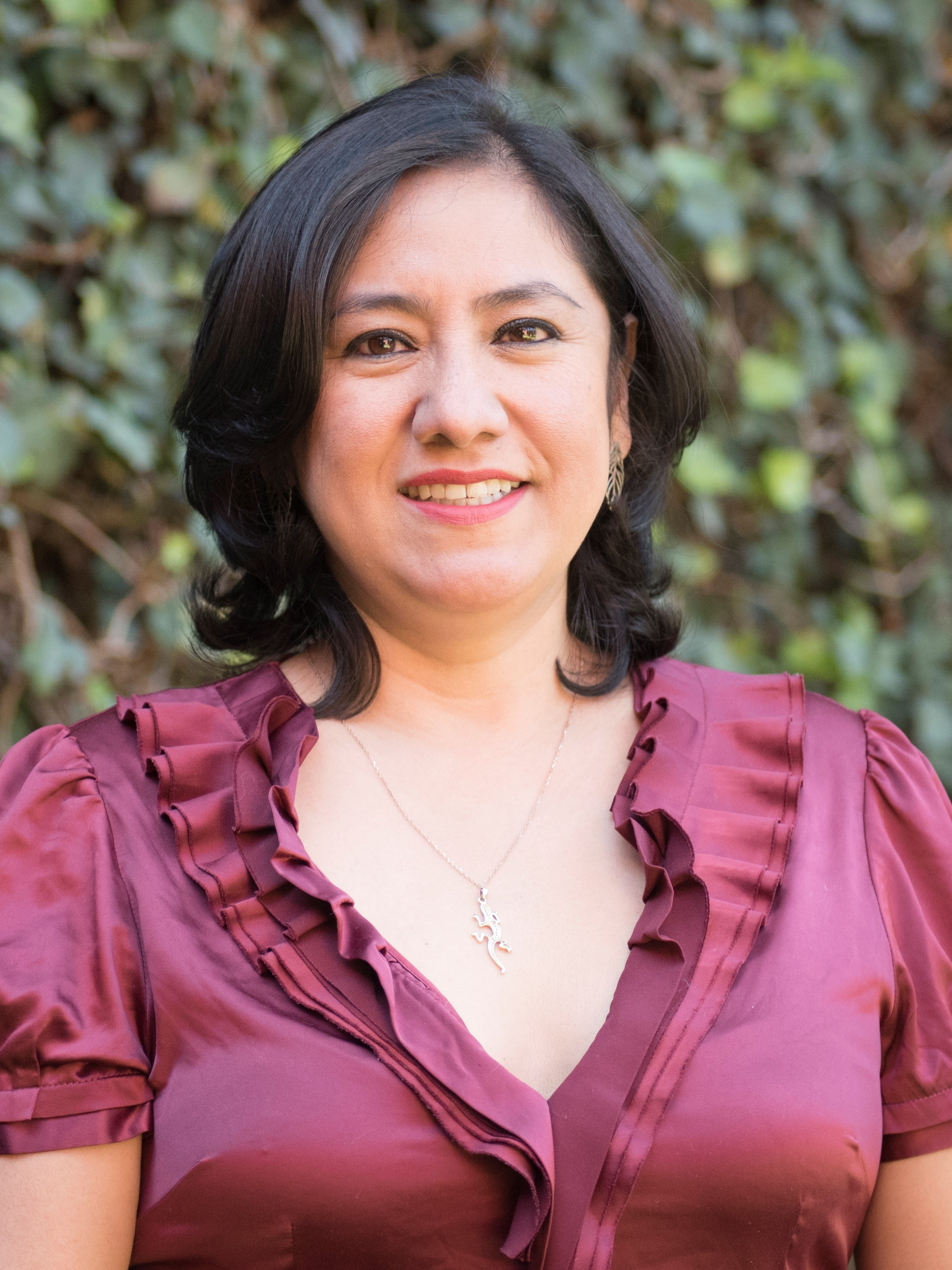
- Born: 1972 (age 53–54)
- Education: Metropolitan Autonomous University (BA); National Autonomous University of Mexico (BA, MA); University of California, Santa Cruz (MA, PhD)
- Occupation: Public servant
- Employer: Ministry of Public Administration
- Spouse: John M. Ackerman

Irma Eréndira Sandoval Ballesteros (born 1972) is a Mexican politician and scholar, expert in public administration and corruption control. In 2018 she was appointed by President Andrés Manuel López Obrador as head of the Ministry of Public Administration. Prior to her designation, in 2016, she was elected member of Mexico's City Constituent Assembly, where she was vice-coordinator of Morena's parliamentary fraction and secretary of the Committee for Good Governance, Fight against Corruption and Responsibilities of Public Servants.

She has also worked for more than a decade at UNAM's Institute for Social Research, where she founded the Corruption and Transparency Documentation and Analysis Laboratory. She also holds the highest level of achievement in the Mexican National System of Researchers. In 2009, she received the "Manuel Espinosa Yglesias” Prize, awarded by the Espinosa Yglesias Study Center and the Espinosa Rugarcía Foundation. Internationally, she has also been a professor at the Sciences Po Paris and Sciences Po Poitiers, the Institute des Hautes Études de L 'Amérique Latine (IHEAL), and the American University in Washington D.C. She has been affiliated researcher of the Edmond J. Safra Center for Ethics in Harvard University and received the "Alfonso Reyes" Cathedra for Mexico, Central America and the Caribbean, awarded by Sorbonne University in Paris.

She holds a PhD in Politics from the University of California Santa Cruz; two master's degrees, the first in Latin American Studies from the Faculty of Political and Social Sciences at UNAM, and the second in Politics from the University of California Santa Cruz, and she also has two bachelor's degrees, one in Economics from the Faculty of Economics at UNAM and another in Sociology from Universidad Autónoma Metropolitana.

On 27 April 2020, she tested positive for COVID-19, making her the highest ranking Mexican official to test positive for the coronavirus.

== Corruption Scandals ==
Although Irma Eréndira Sandoval was the minister in charge of ensuring that public servants are graft-free, media have reported that she accepted a plot of land from the city government under Marcelo Ebrard (currently, Secretary of Foreign Affairs of Mexico), and acquired several million dollar properties outright without taking out any mortgages and while on an academic’s salary. However, Sandoval Ballesteros denied these accusations, making it clear that she has never received any property as a gift or donation from any public official or politician, either during or before her current position.

== Selected works ==
- Sandoval, Irma Eréndira, ed. (2011). Contemporary Debates on Corruption and Transparency: Rethinking State, Market, and Society. Washington, D.C.: World Bank. ISBN 9786070221606. OCLC 857811303.
- Sandoval, Irma Eréndira, ed. (2011). Crisis, Rentismo e Intervencionismo Neoliberal en la Banca: México (1982-1999). Mexico City.: Centro de Estudios Espinosa Yglesias. ISBN 978-607-8036-07-3. OCLC 1029898446.
- She has published over two dozen book chapters and journal articles in peer-reviewed journals, including the International Law Review, the Administrative Law Review, Revista Mexicana de Sociología, Revista Mexicana de Ciencia Polítca, Revista Argumentos, Perfiles Latinoamericanos, Edward Elgar, and Fondo de Cultura Económica.
- She also published multiple opinion pieces in leading newspapers both in Mexico and the United States, including Los Angeles Times, Chicago Times, La Jornada, Proceso, and Reforma.
