= Social Justice in the Liberal State =

Book by Bruce A. Ackerman

- Author: Bruce A. Ackerman
- Language: English
- Genre: Philosophy
- Publisher: Yale University Press
- Publication date: 1980
- Publication place: United States
- ISBN: 0-300-02439-8

Social Justice in the Liberal State is a book of political philosophy written by Bruce A. Ackerman. It examines the foundations of liberalism and liberal democracy. Ackerman addresses the positive case for a liberalism that glorifies neither the state bureaucracy nor the private market.

To Ackerman, liberalism is a kind of structured conversation in which verbal negotiation among those with differing visions of the good life is an alternative to the exercise of naked power. He argues that the premises of a course of contract reasoning can be manipulated so as to yield (more or less) any conclusion that the theorist has some antecedent interest in producing. The social contract is the contract which would be confirmed by the entire population, under ideal conditions, after perfect and complete consideration.

Ackerman offers a suggestion for determining whether any persons among a genetically diverse group are genetically disadvantaged, arguing that to be genetically undominated, a person must possess a set of abilities that permit him to pursue some life purpose that some persons have, with as much facility as any other person is able to pursue that life purpose. He asserts that every person has a right to be genetically undominated.

Ackerman defends the privatization of religious convictions. Ackerman argues for a maximal separation doctrine in that religion does not have an appropriate place in the public realm of a liberal democracy. The book also briefly suggests "responsive lotteries", prototypes of lottery voting as a way to decide issues but leaves the question hanging in the air by inviting others to devote more serious thought to lottery voting.

== See also ==
- Political philosophy
- Social contract
- Social justice
