= Tamara Bower =

American writer

- Education: Drawing & Painting
- Alma mater: University of California, Irvine
- Occupation: Children's Author Archaeological Illustrator
- Writing career
- Years active: 2000–present
- Genre: Children's Literature
- Website: tamarabower.com

Tamara Bower is an American archaeological illustrator and children's author. She has worked as a staff illustrator at the Metropolitan Museum of Art and as a technical illustrator for archaeological digs in Egypt, Turkey, Spain, Belize, and California, and is also the author/illustrator of three children's books set in ancient Egypt. She lives in New York, NY.

== Biography ==
She has been painting and drawing since she was a child, first introduced by her mother, also an artist, and has also had her passion for ancient Egypt since childhood. Years after completing her degree in painting and drawing, she was trained as a staff illustrator at the Metropolitan Museum of Art during the spring and summer of 1992 and then spent nearly a decade working as a staff illustrator at the Brooklyn Museum of Art.

She has been writing and illustrating children's books since before 2000, publishing three in the first fifteen years of the twenty-first century while also spending seven seasons at various archaeological digs in that time. Both her literary and illustrative styles draw from the Assyrian and Egyptian art which she has worked with as an archaeologist, and her books also incorporate hieroglyph translations of important lines in her stories. In addition, her books provide notes on the inspiration and historical grounding for her stories.

== Works ==
- The Shipwrecked Sailor. New York: Atheneum. 2000. ISBN 9780689830464.
- How the Amazon Queen Fought the Prince of Egypt. New York: Atheneum. 2005.
- The Mummy Makers of Egypt. New York: Triangle Square. 2015.

== Awards ==
- 2005 BCCB Blue Ribbon Nonfiction Book for How the Amazon Queen Fought the Prince of Egypt
- 2006 ALA Amelia Bloomer Award for Nonfiction Picture Book for How the Amazon Queen Fought the Prince of Egypt
- 2006 Africana Book Award for Young Children for How the Amazon Queen Fought the Prince of Egypt
