= Chang Wen-chen =

Taiwanese legal scholar

- 張文貞
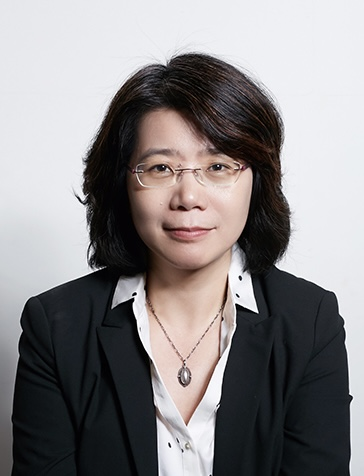
- Official portrait, 2024
- Born: 31 August 1970 (age 56); Taipei, Taiwan
- Occupation: University teacher

Academic background
- Education: National Taiwan University (LLB, LLM); Yale University (LLM, JSD)
- Thesis: Transition to Democracy, Constitutionalism and Judicial Activism: Taiwan in Comparative Constitutional Perspective (2001)
- Doctoral advisor: Bruce Ackerman

Academic work
- Discipline: Constitutional law
- Institutions: National Taiwan University

Chang Wen-chen (Chinese: 張文貞; born 31 August 1970) is a Taiwanese legal scholar who is a distinguished professor at National Taiwan University. She has also served as a law professor at National Chiao Tung University, where she was dean of its law faculty.

== Education ==
Chang graduated from National Taiwan University with a Bachelor of Laws (LL.B.) and then a Master of Laws (LL.M.) degree. She then earned a second Master of Laws and then a Doctor of Juridical Science (J.S.D.) in 2001 from Yale Law School, where her doctoral supervisor was law professor Bruce Ackerman. Her doctoral dissertation was titled, "Transition to Democracy, Constitutionalism and Judicial Activism: Taiwan in Comparative Constitutional Perspective".

== Academic career ==
As a legal academic, she has commented on China's Anti-Secession Law, the Legislative Yuan's inaction causing vacancies in the presidency and vice presidency of the Control Yuan between 2005 and 2008, limitations on the Control Yuan's powers, and supported amendments to laws regarding protests and demonstrations. Chen was one of 36 co-signers of a statement opining that Ma Ying-jeou had overstepped his presidential authority during the September 2013 power struggle.

Chang is a founding member of the Asian Human Rights Court Simulation, established in 2018, and in 2019, was named its vice president. In 2022 and 2024, Chang served on the selection committee for the Tang Prize in Rule of Law. She has also chaired the Restoration of Victim's Rights Infringed by Illegal Acts of the State During the Period of Authoritarian Rule Foundation.

In 2024, Chang testified as an expert witness to the Constitutional Court in cases that led to protests. In August of that year, William Lai nominated Chang to serve as president of the Judicial Yuan. However, legislative confirmation hearings for seven Judicial Yuan positions, including replacements for president Hsu Tzong-li and vice president Tsai Jeong-duen were delayed, necessitating the appointment of Shieh Ming-yuan as acting president of the Judicial Yuan. Hearings eventually began on 2 December, but left the Judicial Yuan with the lowest number of justices since the introduction of judicial interpretation in 1947. During legislative questioning on 10 December, Chang observed that the Judicial Yuan had imposed stricter conditions on capital punishment earlier that year, but maintained that the death penalty was constitutional. The Legislative Yuan voted to reject Chang's nomination, and that of six others to the Judicial Yuan, on 24 December 2024. Days before deciding on Lai's nominees, legislators had voted to require the Judicial Yuan have ten active judges before hearing a case.
