= Michael Deibert =

American journalist (born 1973)

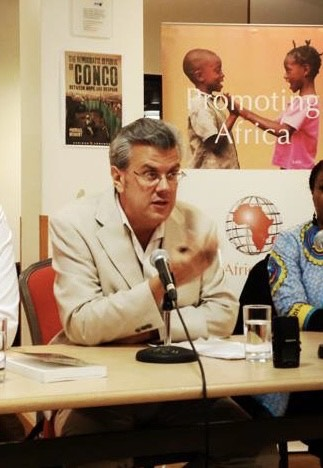
- Michael Deibert at SOAS University of London in 2013.
- Born: Michael Caleb Deibert; 25 July 1973 (age 52); Lancaster, Pennsylvania
- Education: Bard College
- Occupation: Journalist

Michael Deibert (born July 25, 1973) is an American journalist, author and researcher.

== Biography ==
Deibert was born in Lancaster, Pennsylvania, and is a graduate of Bard College. His first book, Notes from the Last Testament: The Struggle for Haiti, with an introduction by the Haitian filmmaker Raoul Peck, was published by Seven Stories Press in November 2005. Deibert's second book, The Democratic Republic of Congo: Between Hope and Despair, was published as part of the Zed Books African Arguments series in cooperation with the Royal African Society, the International African Institute and the World Peace Foundation in 2013. A third book, In the Shadow of Saint Death: The Gulf Cartel and the Price of America's Drug War in Mexico, was published by Lyons Press in June 2014. A new work, Haiti Will Not Perish: A Recent History, was published by Zed Books in summer 2017.

Deibert's writing has appeared in The Washington Post, The Wall Street Journal, The Miami Herald, The Guardian, Folha de Sao Paulo, Le Monde diplomatique and the World Policy Journal, among other publications. From 2001 until 2003, he served as the Reuters correspondent in Port-au-Prince, Haiti. He has been featured as a commentator on international affairs on the BBC, Al Jazeera, Channel 4, National Public Radio, WNYC New York Public Radio and KPFK Pacifica Radio.

Deibert has reported extensively from Haiti, the Democratic Republic of Congo, France, Guatemala, and Mexico.

While Deibert's work on Haiti has been praised by Haitian scholars and others, it has also been criticized by partisans of former Haitian president Jean-Bertrand Aristide. Deibert's book on the Democratic Republic of Congo was called "mandatory reading for anyone interested in building lasting peace in the heart of Africa" by the Institute of Development Studies, "a comprehensive first-rate account of the tragedy of Congo...Riveting and brutally honest" by the Free Africa Foundation and "a scrupulously researched reminder of how this corner of the world became so wretched, and of the multiple actors responsible" by The Guardian. Latin American Politics and Society called In the Shadow of Saint Death "a superb piece of reporting on U.S. drug policy and its devastating effects on drug-producing and transit countries in the Western Hemisphere."

In 2012, he was awarded a Small Peace Research Grant by International Peace Research Association in recognition of his work in the Democratic Republic of Congo.

Since 2017, Deibert has worked extensively in the U.S. territory of Puerto Rico, and has been highly critical of the approach of the U.S. federal government to the island.

Deibert's 2019 book, When the Sky Fell: Hurricane Maria and the United States in Puerto Rico, was characterized by Publishers Weekly as “an impassioned analysis [that] explores the role of the U.S.'s territorial relationship with Puerto Rico," and by Library Journal as "a thoroughly researched history of Puerto Rico, presented with the goal of helping readers better understand the ongoing impact of colonialism, and how the U.S. mainland responded to the hurricane's impact."

He currently teaches at the Department of Journalism and Digital Communication at the University of South Florida.

== Bibliography ==
- Notes from the Last Testament: The Struggle for Haiti. New York: Seven Stories Press. 2005. ISBN 978-1-58322-697-1.
- The Democratic Republic of Congo: Between Hope and Despair. London: Zed Books. 2013. ISBN 978-1780323459.
- In the Shadow of Saint Death: The Gulf Cartel and the Price of America's Drug War in Mexico. New York: Lyons Press. 2014. ISBN 978-0762791255.
- Haiti Will Not Perish: A Recent History. London: Zed Books. 2017. ISBN 978-1783607983.
- When the Sky Fell: Hurricane Maria and the United States in Puerto Rico. New York: Apollo Publishers. 2019. ISBN 978-1948062367.
- With the Pen in One Hand and the Sword in the Other: Haiti and the United States in the Nineteenth Century. Athens: University of Georgia Press. 2026. ISBN 978-0820381008.
