= Elizabeth Ewen =

Elizabeth Ewen (died 2012) was a scholar of women's history, immigration, and film. She was among the first feminist historians to write about early American cinema. Ewen was a professor of American Studies at the State University of New York at Old Westbury (SUNY).

Noted film historian Robert Sklar described Ewen's 1980 article, “City Lights: Immigrant Women and the Rise of the Movies,” in Signs: Journal of Women in Culture and Society, as 'the first significant writing by a historian on early American cinema to follow the author's and [Garth] Jowett's books.” Ewen's book, Immigrant Women in the Land of Dollars, examined the role of cinema in the lives of immigrant girls and women in New York City's Lower East Side. Filmmaker Ellen Noonan has explained that the book was the inspiration for the 1993 documentary Heaven Will Protect the Working Girl.

Elizabeth Ewen authored several books with her husband, media historian Stuart Ewen, and her colleague Rosalyn Baxandall, including Channels of Desire: Mass Images and the Shaping of American Consciousness (1992), Picture Windows: How the Suburbs Happened (2000), Typecasting: On the Arts and Sciences of Human Inequality (2006).

Ewen's work is frequently cited by contemporary historians.

Elizabeth Ewen died May 29, 2012, in Manhattan, New York.

== Selected publications ==
- Elizabeth Ewen, “City Lights: Immigrant Women and the Rise of the Movies,” Signs: Journal of Women in Culture and Society, Vol. 5, no. 3, 1980.
- Elizabeth Ewen (4 January 2008). Picture Windows. Basic Books. ISBN 978-0-465-01178-0.
