= Malaika wa Azania =

South African political commentator

- Born: Malaika Lesego Samora Mahlatsi; 19 October 1991 (age 34); Soweto, South Africa
- Education: Rhodes University
- Occupations: Writer, Political commentator
- Writing career
- Period: 2014-
- Genre: Political commentary
- Subject: South African Politics
- Notable work: Memoirs of a Born Free: Reflections on the Rainbow Nation
- Website: www.thoughtleader.co.za/malaikawaazania

Malaika wa Azania, (born 19 October 1991) born Malaika Lesego Samora Mahlatsi, is a South African writer, political commentator, essayist, blogger, columnist, and television presenter. She is also a self-proclaimed feminist. In 2014, she published her first book "Memoirs of a Born Free." The book describes her family history, beginning with her grandmother's life, then her mother, and finally her own. The book is framed as a letter to the ANC to both thank and criticize the party on the development of South Africa since 1994. Primarily, Wa Azania details her disillusionment with the concept of the "Rainbow Nation" and being a "Born Free."

== Biography ==
Malaika Wa Azania was born in Zone 8 Meadowlands, Soweto, on 19 October 1991. She was raised by a single mother, Dipuo Mahlatsi, a student activist who was part of the Congress of South African Students (COSAS) and member of the African National Congress Youth League (ANCYL). Wa Azania cites her mother as a strong influence during her childhood. She was exposed to politics when visiting her mother who worked in Braamfontein at SANGOCO, where she would read the books and organizational literature in her mother's office.

In her late teens, the Mahlatsi family relocated to Dobsonville, Soweto. In 2010, after completing her matric, she relocated to Cape Town where she worked at the Alternative Information and Development Centre (AIDC) as an intern. She returned to Johannesburg the following year where she worked at the Jozi Book Fair division of Khanya College.

Between 2012 and 2017, Malaika lived in Grahamstown where she pursued an undergraduate and postgraduate degree at Rhodes University. She continued with her activism, serving in the SADC Food and Nutrition Security Committee, the African Youth Coalition and the South African Students Congress, where she served as the Branch Secretary of Rhodes University from 2012.

In 2017 Malaika worked in the Ministry of Communications before her political principal was reshuffled to the Ministry of Science and Technology. She resigned in 2018, citing personal reasons, before moving to local government in 2019, where she was suspended from work for unprofessional conduct at the City of Ekurhuleni. She was reinstated shortly thereafter and continues working in the Office of the Executive Mayor. Malaika is also a television presenter of Youth Talk Show, Bua Fela, on Moja Love, DSTV Channel 157. She writes a weekly column in the Sowetan newspaper and a bi-monthly column in The Herald newspaper.

== Education ==
Wa Azania attended Tshimologo Junior Primary in Zone 9 Meadowlands until grade five. Thereafter, she attended Melpark Primary School in Melville, Johannesburg. She completed her high school education at Florida Park High School, before studying at Rhodes University where she obtained a Bachelor of Science degree majoring in Geography. She went on to obtain a Bachelor of Science (Honours) degree cum laude at the same university in 2017. Malaika pursued a Master of Science degree in Geography at Rhodes University and in 2021 completed a Master of Public Affairs at the Tshwane University of Technology under the supervision of Professor Mashupye Herbert Maserumule. In the same year, she registered for a Master of Science in Urban and Regional Planning at the University of Johannesburg.

== Achievements ==
Wa Azania has written for the Mail & Guardian, The Thinker, DestinyConnect, Sunday Independent and the African Independent. She is the former African Union African Youth Charter ambassador for the SADC region and a former youth representative in the SADC Food and Nutrition Security Committee. She also served as the Secretary General of the African Youth Coalition, established in 2013 by the Thabo Mbeki Foundation in South Africa.

Wa Azania was selected as one of the top young South Africans in the Mail & Guardian 200 Young South Africans in 2015. In 2016, she was awarded the Youth Making it Happen Award by the former Miss South Africa, Joan Ramagoshi.

She is the director of her own company Pen and Azanian Revolution (Pty) Ltd.

== Publications ==
Books

- Memoirs of a Born Free: Reflections on the Rainbow Nation. Jacana Media, 2014.
- Corridors of Death: The Struggle to Exist in Historically White Institutions. Blackbird Books, 2020.

== Personal life ==
Malaika has a younger brother, Lumumba, named after Congolese leader, Patrice Lumumba. They live in Johannesburg, South Africa. Her family still resides in Soweto.

In June 2017, she lost her mother, whom she wrote about in her book "Memoirs of a Born Free", to gastrointestinal cancer. Following her mother's death, Malaika retreated from public engagements, though she still wrote her weekly column in the Sunday Sun newspaper.
