= Susan Rose-Ackerman =

American professor of jurisprudence (born 1942)

- Born: Susan Gould Rose; April 23, 1942 (age 84); Mineola, New York, U.S.
- Spouse: Bruce Ackerman
- Children: John M. Ackerman

Academic background
- Education: Wellesley College (BA); Yale University (PhD)

Academic work
- Discipline: Economics; public policy
- Institutions: University of Pennsylvania; Yale University; Columbia University

Susan Rose-Ackerman (née Rose; born April 23, 1942) is Henry R. Luce Professor Emeritus of Law and Professor Emeritus of Political Science at Yale University. She is an expert in political corruption and development, administrative law and regulatory policy, the nonprofit sector, and federalism.

Rose-Ackerman has been a fellow at the Wissenschaftskolleg zu Berlin, Sciences Po, the Center for Advanced Study in the Behavioral Sciences and Collegium Budapest, as well as a visiting research scholar at the World Bank. She holds a Ph.D. in Economics from Yale University and has held Guggenheim and Fulbright Fellowships. She has a B.A. from Wellesley College. Her current research focuses on comparative administrative law and public policy-making and the political economy of corruption.

== Biography ==
She attended Wellesley College, where she obtained a B.A. in economics (1964) and then attended Yale University, where she was awarded a PhD in economics in 1970. In May 1967, she married Bruce Ackerman, who was a student at Yale Law School. They are the parents of John M. Ackerman and Sybil Ackerman-Munson.

Rose-Ackerman worked as an assistant professor from 1972 to 1974 at the University of Pennsylvania, thereafter returning to Yale. In 1982 she moved to Columbia University and in 1983 became the director of Columbia Law School Center for Law and Economics. In 1987 she again returned to Yale and in 1992 took over the Henry R. Luce Chair of Philosophy of Law at the Yale Law School, and the Department of Political Science.

Rose-Ackerman is also co-director of the Yale Law School's Center for Law, Economics, and Public Policy. She has held fellowships from the Guggenheim Foundation and the Fulbright Commission. She was a visiting research fellow at the World Bank in 1995-96 where she did research on corruption and economic development.

Professor Rose-Ackerman is a member of the Advisory Board to the Allard Prize for International Integrity.

== Works ==
Major publications include the following:

- "The economics of corruption". Journal of Public Economics 4.2 (1975): 187-203.
- The Economics of Corruption: a study in political economy. New York: Academic Press, 1978.
- Rethinking the Progressive Agenda: The Reform of the American Regulatory State. Free Pr, 1992.
- Corruption and government: Causes, consequences, and reform. Cambridge University Press, 1999.
- Economics of Administrative Law (Economic Approaches to Law Series), Edward Elgar Pub, 2008.
- "Corruption: Greed, Culture and the State"; The Yale Law Journal, 9 November 2010.
- International Handbook on the Economics of Corruption (Elgar Original Reference), Edward Elgar Pub, 2013.
- Corruption and Government: Causes, Consequences and Reform, 2nd edition, with Bonnie J. Palifka, Cambridge UK: Cambridge University Press, 2016.
- Due Process of Lawmaking(with Stephanie Egidy and James Fowkes), Cambridge UK: Cambridge University Press, 2015.
- From Elections to Democracy: Building Accountable Government in Hungary and Poland, Cambridge and New York: Cambridge University Press, 2005.
- International Handbook on the Economics of Corruption, vol I, Cheltenham UK and Northampton MA: Edward Elgar, 2006, vol II (with Tina Søreide), Cheltenham UK and Northampton MA: Edward Elgar, 2011.
- Comparative Administrative Law (with Peter Lindseth and Blake Emerson), Cheltenham UK and Northampton MA: Edward Elgar, 2017.
- Anti-Corruption Policy: Can International Actors Play a Constructive Role? (with Paul Carrington), Durham, NC: Carolina Academic Press, 2013
- Greed, Corruption and the Modern State (with Paul Lagunes), Cheltenham UK and Northampton MA: Edward Elgar, 2015.
