= Frederic Ewen Academic Freedom Center =

The Frederic Ewen Academic Freedom Center at New York University's Tamiment Library is named after Frederic Ewen, an author, teacher, and an outspoken advocate for civil liberties and intellectual freedom. A much-loved professor of literature at Brooklyn College, Ewen's vigorous advocacy of freedom of thought and egalitarian principles ran into the wall of McCarthyism, and in 1952 he was forced to resign from his post at Brooklyn College.

== Aims ==
The aims of the Frederic Ewen Academic Freedom Center are:

1. To promote research and writing about academic freedom, its history, and the connection between past and present; to explicate the role that academic freedom plays in the university, the public schools, and in the fabric of American life. The Center seeks to encourage and support scholarship that links the struggle to defend academic freedom to broader issues of civil liberties, and to the role of the university in a free society.
2. To organize and sponsor public forums and events to discuss and explain the meaning of academic freedom, the essential role it plays in advancing and protecting democratic values, and to analyze contemporary developments that may undermine the viability of the university as a citadel for the protection of the free exchange of knowledge and ideas, without the threat of external pressures.
3. To promote the scholarly study of academic freedom by offering a yearly competitive fellowship to support a scholar, student, or filmmaker working in this area.
4. To provide information, resources, and research support that will advance the cause of academic freedom in the United States and worldwide. In this regard, the Ewen Center builds upon and strengthens the Tamiment Library's ties with scholars, students and public historians working on the history of academic freedom, and on policy issues relating to the protection of academic freedom.
