= Innosanto Nagara =

American writer

- Born: Jakarta, Indonesia
- Education: Masters in zoology and philosophy
- Alma mater: UC Davis
- Occupations: Writer, illustrator, graphic designer
- Children: Arief Romero
- Writing career
- Genre: Children's books
- Notable work: A is for Activist
- Website: Official website

Innosanto Nagara is a children's author, activist, and graphic designer. He is the author of the alphabet book A is for Activist as well as the other children's books Counting on Community, My Night in the Planetarium, and the newly released The Wedding Portrait. He is also the founder of Design Action Collective, a self-described Marxist organization that believes "capitalism is an inherently exploitative and alienating system and that socialism presents a positive alternative." As well, the Design Action Collective believes "the US government is the main impediment to peace and justice on a global scale" and, as of 2010, actively supports the Boycott, Divestment and Sanctions (BDS) campaign against Israel’s violations of Palestinian human rights’. According to NPR, Nagara began writing children's books upon realizing that he could not find "a fun book" that "talked about the importance of social justice."

== Career ==
Nagara was born and raised in Jakarta, Indonesia, and moved to the US in 1988. He studied zoology and philosophy at UC Davis, after graduating he moved to the San Francisco Bay Area, where he worked as a graphic designer for a range of social change organizations, before founding the Design Action Collective, a worker-owned cooperative design studio in Oakland, California.

A is for Activist, Nagara's first children's book, was published by Seven Stories Press’ children's imprint Triangle Square in 2013. In 2015 Counting on Community was published, described by Publishers Weekly as "a counting book that celebrates active communities" and emphasized "that close-knit communities . . . have real power." It was followed by My Night in the Planetarium in 2016, based on a night when Nagara and his mother hid from the police in a planetarium. The Wedding Portrait is Nagara's next book, based on the events surrounding his own wedding day, was published in October 2017. He illustrated the 2021 children's book Together, authored by Mona Damluji.

== Reception ==
Nagara's A is for Activist has received acclaim for its "progressive message [which] has made its way into material aimed at little ones" in a particularly unique and straightforward manner.

The Washington Post likewise published an interview with Innosanto Nagara in its parenting section discussing the necessity of progressive messages in young children. An American Library Association review of A is for Activist took issue with the introduction of complex issues at the level of an alphabet book, pointed out that families "may need to undergo hours of explanation and long, ongoing conversations about ideas raised on every single page."

Counting on Community was favorably reviewed by Kirkus Reviews ("a difficult concept is simply and strikingly illustrated for the very youngest"), Publishers Weekly ("Nagara's vibrant digital collages hum with energy"), and the School Library Journal ("powerful concept. . . . young readers will have fun"). My Night in the Planetarium received positive reviews from Publishers Weekly, who said it was "a stirring tribute to the power of the arts to challenge injustice," and Rethinking Schools, whose Rachel Cloues said that the "engaging art, humor, and a warm, colloquial style" made it a "gift" for "helping parents and educators explain complex issues to our children." Brandon Greene, writing for HuffPost, asked readers "what books are you using to prepare your children?"
