= Bruce Ackerman =

American constitutional law scholar (born 1943)

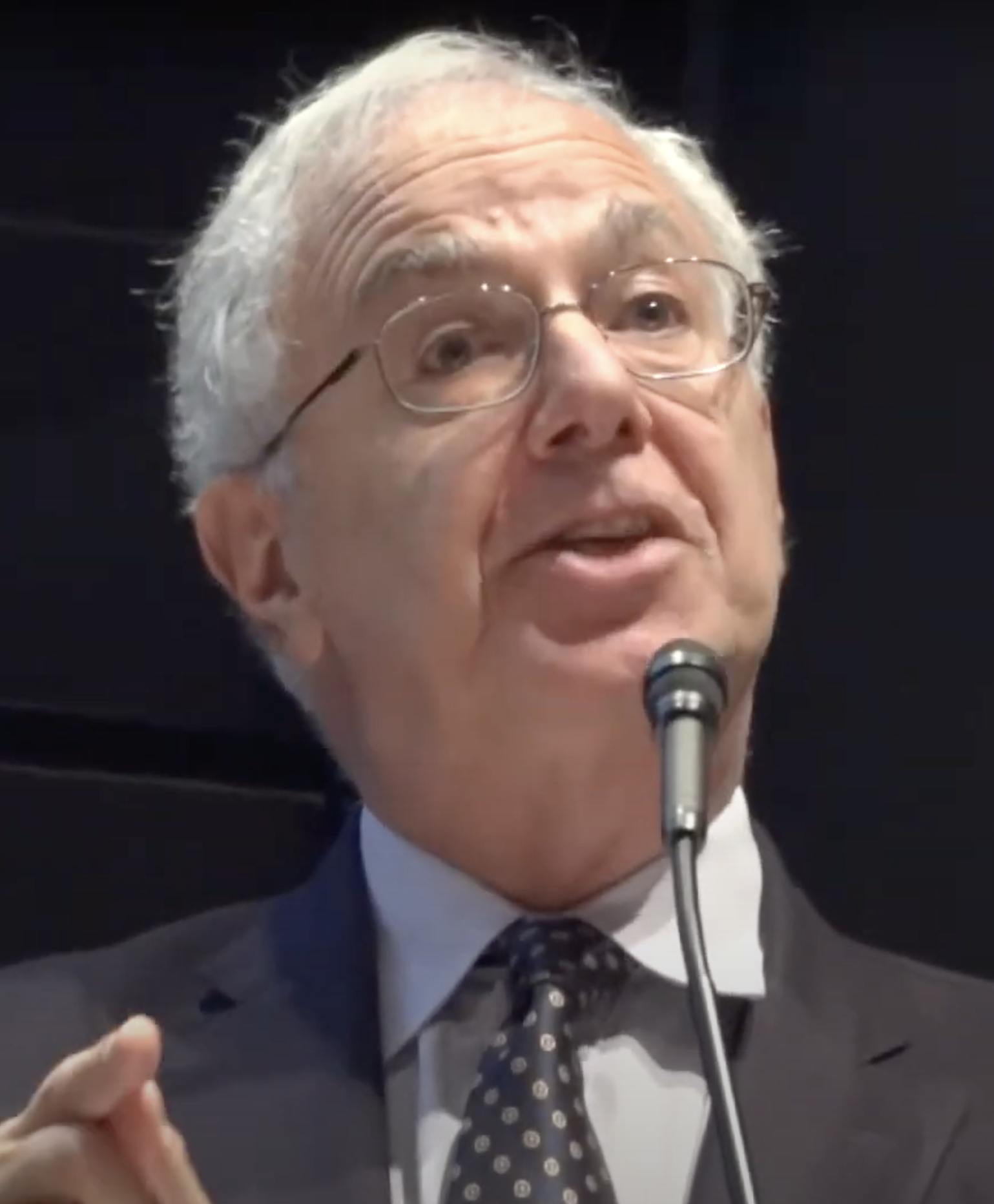
- Ackerman in 2017
- Born: Bruce Arnold Ackerman; August 19, 1943 (age 83); New York City, U.S.
- Education: Harvard University (BA); Yale University (LLB)
- Occupations: Law professor; author
- Title: Sterling Professor of Law and Political Science
- Spouse: Susan Rose-Ackerman (m. 1967)
- Children: John M. Ackerman; Sybil Ackerman-Munson
- Awards: Tang Prize (2026)

Academic work
- Discipline: Constitutional law
- Institutions: University of Pennsylvania; Yale University; Columbia University
- Doctoral students: Chang Wen-chen
- Notable works: We the People (1991–2014)

Bruce Arnold Ackerman (born August 19, 1943) is an American legal scholar and political philosopher who serves as Sterling Professor of Law and Political Science at Yale University. He is recognized for his contributions to constitutional theory, democratic governance, and political philosophy, particularly his theory of constitutional change through "constitutional moments" and his concept of dualist democracy.

Ackerman is a Fellow of the American Academy of Arts and Sciences and has received the French Order of Merit and the 2026 Tang Prize in the Rule of Law. In 2010, he was named by Foreign Policy magazine to its list of top global thinkers. Ackerman was also identified as one of the top 50 thinkers of the COVID-19 era by Prospect.

== Early life and education ==
Ackerman was born in New York City on August 19, 1943 to Jewish parents. Ackerman's parents fled Eastern Europe, his mother was Polish-Jewish and his father was Hungarian-Jewish. His Jewish ancestors left due to the rise of antisemitic pogroms. He grew up in the Bronx, graduating from the Bronx High School of Science. He went on to earn a Bachelor of Arts, summa cum laude, from Harvard University in 1964, followed by a Bachelor of Laws (equivalent to a Juris Doctor) degree from Yale Law School in 1967.

== Career ==
Ackerman clerked for U.S. Court of Appeals Judge Henry Friendly from 1967 to 1968, and then for U.S. Supreme Court Justice John Marshall Harlan II from 1968 to 1969.

Ackerman joined the faculty of University of Pennsylvania Law School in 1969. He was a professor at Yale University from 1974 to 1982 and at Columbia University from 1982 to 1987. Since 1987 Ackerman has been the Sterling Professor of Law and Political Science at Yale. He teaches classes at Yale on the concepts of justice and on his theories of constitutional transformation. He regards himself as a legal pragmatist. Some of Ackerman's notable students include legal scholars such as Akhil Reed Amar, Noah Feldman, Kenji Yoshino and politicians such as U.S. Representative Ro Khanna.

In 2026, he was awarded the Tang Prize in the category of "Rule of Law".

Ackerman is listed as counsel in U.S. Army Captain Nathan Michael Smith's lawsuit against President Barack Obama.

== Scholarship ==
=== Early work ===
Ackerman's early scholarship focused on environmental policy, constitutional law, and political philosophy. His first major book, The Uncertain Search for Environmental Quality (1972), co-authored with Susan Rose-Ackerman, examined environmental policymaking in the United States. He followed it with Private Property and the Constitution (1977), an analysis of constitutional protections for private property and government regulation.

His work in political philosophy culminated in Social Justice in the Liberal State (1980), which developed a theory of liberal justice and explored the relationship between equality, liberty, and democratic government. He later published Clean Coal/Dirty Air (1981), with William Hassler, on environmental regulation, and Reconstructing American Law (1984), which examined legal reasoning and the structure of American law.

=== Constitutional theory ===
Beginning in the late 1980s, Ackerman shifted his research to American constitutional development, resulting in the We the People trilogy: Foundations (1991), Transformations (1998), and The Civil Rights Revolution (2014).

The series advances Ackerman's theory of "constitutional moments," arguing that major constitutional changes in the United States have occurred through periods of sustained democratic mobilization outside the formal amendment process established by Article V. He identifies the Founding, Reconstruction, and the New Deal as key constitutional moments that reshaped the constitutional order. Closely associated with this work is his theory of dualist democracy, which distinguishes between ordinary politics and the exceptional periods in which citizens directly participate in fundamental constitutional change.

=== Democratic reform ===
Ackerman with Anne Alstott, co-authored The Stakeholder Society (1999), which proposed providing every young adult with a publicly funded capital grant to expand economic opportunity.

Ackerman later co-authored Voting with Dollars (2002) with Ian Ayres, proposing publicly funded campaign vouchers to reduce the influence of private money in elections, and Deliberation Day (2004) with James Fishkin, which advocated a national holiday before presidential elections to encourage informed public discussion.

=== Comparative constitutionalism ===
His book The Future of Liberal Revolution (1992) explored the constitutional challenges facing post-communist states as they transitioned to democracy. He returned to the subject in Revolutionary Constitutions: Charismatic Leadership and the Rule of Law (2019), which examined constitutional development in countries including France, India, Iran, Israel, Italy, Poland, South Africa, and the United States, with particular attention to how revolutionary change can shape lasting constitutional systems.

== Personal life ==
Ackerman is married to Susan Rose-Ackerman, also a professor at Yale Law School, who teaches classes on administrative law. Their son, John M. Ackerman, also an academic, lives and works in Mexico. Their daughter, Sybil Ackerman-Munson, is an environmentalist in Portland, Oregon.

== Books ==
His works include:

- 1980: Social Justice in the Liberal State (ISBN 9780300024395)
- 1991: We the People, Volume 1, Foundations (ISBN 9780674948419)
- 1995: Is NAFTA Constitutional?, with David Golove (ISBN 9780674467125)
- 1998: We the People, Volume 2, Transformations (ISBN 9780674003972)
- 1999: The Stakeholder Society, with Anne Alstott (ISBN 9780300078268)
- 2002: Voting with Dollars, with Ian Ayres (ISBN 9780300127010)
- 2004: Deliberation Day, with James S. Fishkin (ISBN 978-0-300-10964-1)
- 2005: The Failure of the Founding Fathers (ISBN 9780674023956)
- 2006: Before the Next Attack: Preserving Civil Liberties in an Age of Terrorism
- 2010: The Decline and Fall of the American Republic (ISBN 9780674057036)
- 2014: We the People, Volume 3: The Civil Rights Revolution (ISBN 9780674050297)
- 2018: Revolutionary Constitutions: Charismatic Leadership and the Rule of Law (ISBN 9780674970687)
- 2024: The Postmodern Predicament: Existential Challenges of the Twenty-First Century (ISBN 9780300277098)

We the People: Foundations is best known for its forceful argument that the "switch in time", whereby a particular member of the US Supreme Court changed his judicial philosophy to one that permitted much more of the New Deal legislation in response to the so-called court-packing plan, is an example of political determination of constitutional meaning. Ackerman delivered the 2006 Oliver Wendell Holmes Lectures at Harvard Law School.

The Stakeholder Society served as a basis for the introduction of Child Trust Funds in the United Kingdom.

== See also ==
- Asset-based egalitarianism
- List of law clerks for the ninth seat of the Supreme Court of the United States
