= Lafaye =

Lafaye is a surname. Notable people with the surname include:

- Isabelle Lafaye Marziou (born 1963), French para table tennis player
- Jacques Lafaye (1930-2024), French historian
- Jean-Jacques Lafaye (born 1958), French writer and journalist
- Prosper Lafaye, originally Lafait (1806–1883), French painter

== See also ==
- John Carroll (born Julian Lafaye, 1906–1979), American actor and singer
- La Chapelle-en-Lafaye, is a commune in the Loire department in central France
- Sharon Lafaye Jones (1956–2016), American soul and funk singer
