= Le Gal =

Le Gal may refer to...

- André Le Gal (1946-2013), French writer
- Hélène Le Gal (born 1967), French diplomat
- Jean-Michel Le Gal, Canadian stage television and film actor
- Marcelle Louise Fernande Le Gal (1895-1979), French mycologist and lichenologist
- Nadine Le Gal, Quebec politician
