= Book of Abraham (disambiguation) =

The Book of Abraham is a Latter Day Saint text.

Book of Abraham may also refer to:

- The Book of Abraham (novel), a 1986 novel by Marek Halter
- The Book of Abraham the Jew, a book supposedly owned by Nicolas Flamel
- R. Abrahami Eleazaris Uraltes Chymisches Werk, also known as The Book of Abraham the Jew, a 1735 book by Abraham Eleazar
- The Book of Abramelin, a 1458 book by Abraham of Worms
- Apocalypse of Abraham, an Old Testament pseudepigraphon
- Scrolls of Abraham, Islamic texts
- Testament of Abraham, an Old Testament pseudepigraphon
