= André Lacaze =

André Lacaze may refer to:

- André Lacaze (journalist)
- André Lacaze (rugby league)
