= Marek Halter =

French writer and activist

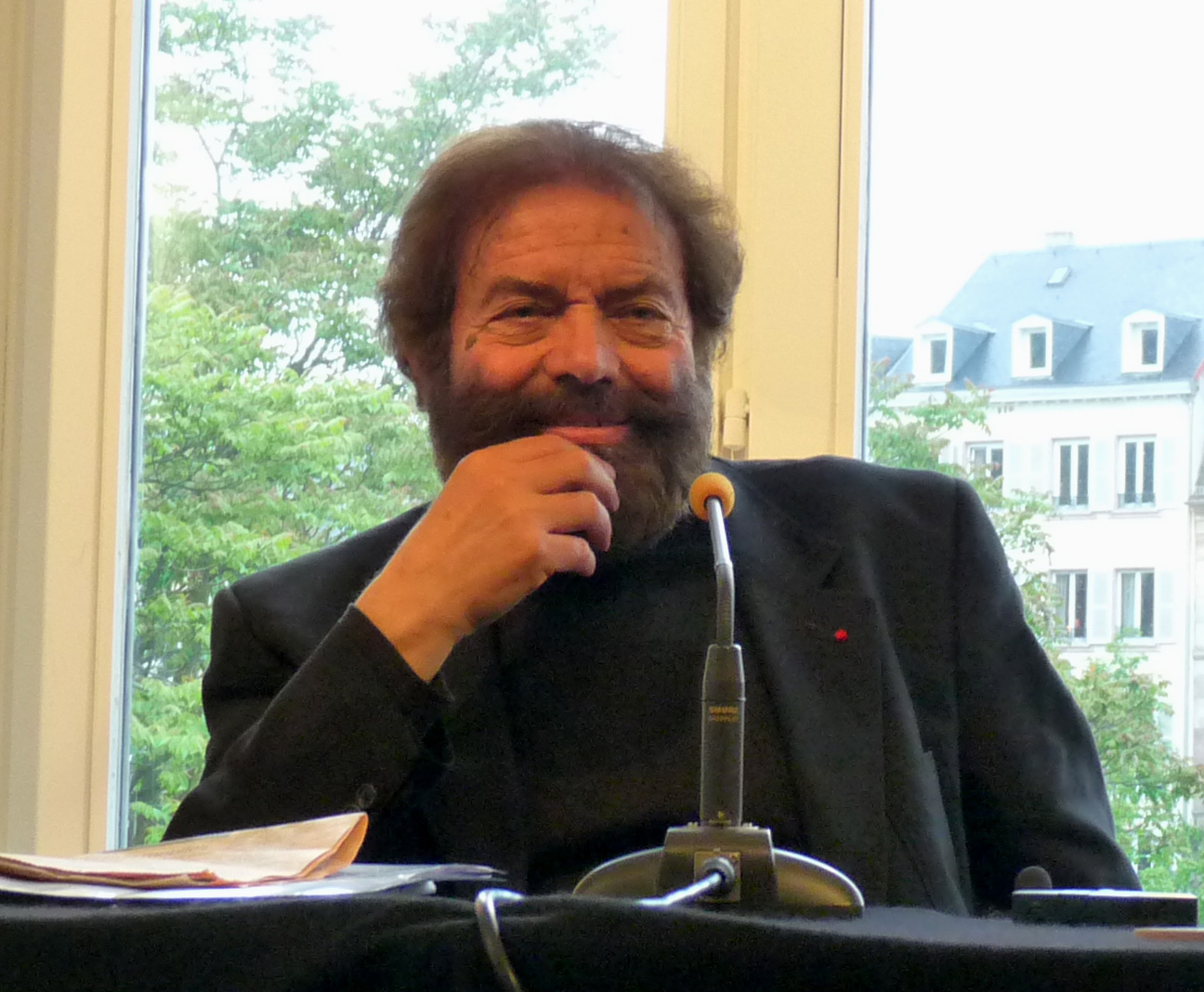
- Halter in Strasbourg in 2010
- Born: January 27, 1936 (age 90)
- Education: École nationale des beaux-arts
- Occupations: Writer, activist, painter, filmmaker
- Writing career
- Years active: 1950s– present
- Notable work: The Book of Abraham (1986)

Marek Halter (born 27 January 1936) is a Polish-born French writer, artist, and human rights activist, who is best known for his historical novels, which have been translated into many languages. He also directed a film, The Righteous, released in 1994.

== Early life and education ==
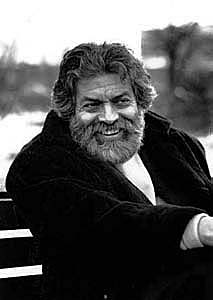
1991

Halter is Jewish, and was born in Warsaw, Poland on 27 January 1936. His father, Salomon, was a descendant of a long line of Jewish printers, his mother, Perl, a poet. Their first language was Yiddish. During World War II, two Polish Roman Catholics helped his family escape from the Warsaw Ghetto. He and his parents fled to the Soviet Union spending the remainder of the war in Ukraine and Uzbekistan, where he learned to speak the Uzbek language.

In 1945, as a member of Uzbekistan's "Young Pioneers", Marek was selected to go to Moscow to present flowers to Joseph Stalin. In 1946 the family returned to Poland, but, experiencing a great deal of antisemitism, they emigrated to France, taking up residence in Paris in 1950.

Halter studied pantomime under Marcel Marceau. He was admitted to the École nationale des beaux-arts to study painting.

== Career ==
Embarking upon a career in painting, his first international exhibition was in 1955 in Buenos Aires, and he remained in that city for two years, returning to France in 1957, where he engaged in political journalism and advocacy. He learnt Spanish while in Argentina.

=== Writing ===
In 1968, he founded together with his wife, Clara Halter, the magazine Élements, which published works by Israeli, Palestinian, and other Arab writers.

His first book was Le Fou et les Rois (The Jester and the Kings), an autobiography published in 1976.

His novels include The Messiah; The Mysteries of Jerusalem; The Book of Abraham (1986) and its sequel, The Children of Abraham (1990); The Wind of the Khazars (2003) — a piece of historical fiction about the Khazars, a nomadic kingdom of Turkic people in the Caucasus who converted to Judaism; Sarah (2004), a bestseller which was adapted into a TV series; Zipporah (2005); Lilah (2006); and Mary of Nazareth (2008).

His historical novels have been translated into English, Polish, Hebrew, and many other languages.

Many of his books focus on the theme of memory, including that of his own family, the history of the Jewish people, and specifically the Holocaust.

=== Film ===
Halter has directed a film, The Righteous (1994; Polish: Tzedek (Note: Tzedek means "justice" or "charity" in Hebrew.)). The Righteous was nominated for a César Award for Best Documentary Film. Halter is also narrator and interviewer in the film, in which he asks the question of people who saved Jews during the war "Why did you do it?". Halter and his wife, Clara, traced around 200 such Gentiles, creating many hours of videotape and around 1,000 pages of interview transcripts. They went through them all, verified their stories, initially choosing 42 stories. They refined it down to 36 men and women in 14 countries, after he "remembered the Talmudic tradition that each generation must produce 36 'righteous' for the world to continue". The film took a year to film and another year to edit, and was selected for screening at the Berlin Film Festival in February 1995.

He also directed an episode of the TV series La case du siècle in 2012.

== Activism and other activities ==
In 1967, Halter founded a committee for a negotiated peace agreement between Palestinians and Israelis, playing a significant role in arranging the first official meetings between the two groups. He held several meetings with Yasser Arafat.

Halter organised campaigns in Paris for Soviet dissidents such as Andrei Sakharov in 1978, and Natan Sharansky, and travelled to Afghanistan to protest the Soviet invasion of the country. Halter co-founded the Jewish Culture Festival in Paris.

In 1991 Halter founded the French College in Moscow (Collèges Universitaires Français), of which he is still president as of 2023.

== Recognition and awards ==
In 1954, he received the Deauville international prize, and was also awarded a prize at the Biennale d'Ancone.

The Book of Abraham (1986) won the Prix Maison de la Presse and the Prix du Livre Inter.

Le Fou et les Rois (The Jester and the Kings) was awarded the Prix Aujourd'hui in 1976.

== Personal life ==
Halter married Clara Halter in 1968. His wife died in 2017.

In 1990 he travelled to Poland for the first time in 40 years. There, he met another man called Marek Halter, a Catholic engineer. This man reported that he had been punished each time the French Halter's anti-Soviet activism had been mentioned in the media, and only discovered the reason years later, when he read an article in an official newspaper about Marek Halter, "the Zionist enemy".

In 2007, French magazines Le Point and Le Nouvel Observateur accused Halter of lying about several parts of his life.

In February 2021, he was assaulted by intruders at his home in Paris, who took nothing except his keys. This was not the first time he had been assaulted, with previous attempts having been accompanied by "a few anti-Semitic or racist words".

Halter remarried in 2023. Daughter of Jacques Derogy, Marianne Weitzmann was 15 years old when she first met Marek. They met in 2020 and were married in the 3ème arrondissement of Paris on 7 February 2023. She died on 21 August 2024.

== Selected works ==
Halter's non-fiction works include:

- The Jester And the Kings: a Political Biography (1989)
- Stories of Deliverance: Speaking with Men And Women Who Rescued Jews from the Holocaust (1998)
- Sarah, trans. Howard Curtis, Bantam Press (UK) & Crown Publishing (USA), 2004
- Zipporah or Zipporah, Wife of Moses, trans. Howard Curtis, Bantam Press (UK) & Crown Publishing (USA) 2005
- Lilah, trans. Howard Curtis, Bantam Press (UK) & Crown Publishing (USA) 2006
