= Robert Marteau =

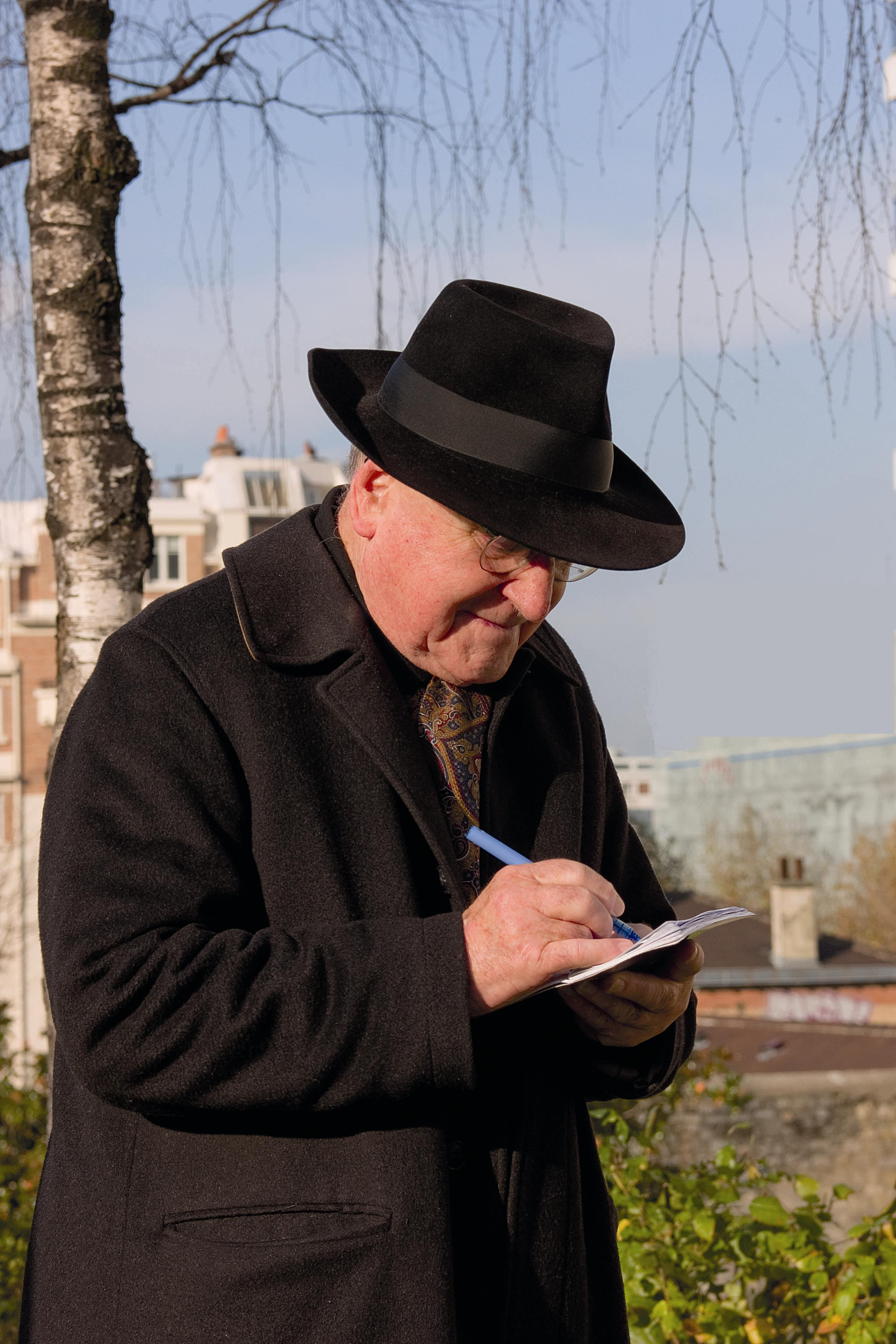
- Born: February 8, 1925; Virollet, France
- Died: May 16, 2011 (aged 86); Paris, France
- Website: robertmarteau.com

Robert Marteau (February 8, 1925 in Virollet, Poitou – May 16, 2011 in Paris) was a French poet, novelist, translator, essayist, diarist.

== Life ==
In 1972 he moved to Montreal to live with his girlfriend, Neige. He remained twelve years, and opt for Canadian citizenship. He then resided in Paris. He was awarded the 2003 Charles Vildrac from the Société des Gens de Lettres for Rites and offerings, In 2005, Académie française awarded him the Grand Award for Poetry after he was awarded the Prix Henri de Régnier in 1997 for all his work from the same Académie. In 2006, the center of the book awarded him Poitou-Charentes book prize, for his novel In the grass. In 2010, he received the Mallarmé prize for his book The Ordinary Time.

== Works ==
- Royaumes, poésie, Seuil, 1962.
- Travaux sur la terre, poésie, Seuil, 1966.
- Des Chevaux parmi les arbres, roman, Seuil, 1968; Champ Vallon, 1992. ISBN 978-2-87673-154-7
- Sibylles, poésie, Paris, Galanis, 1971.
- Les Vitraux de Chagall, essai, Paris, Mazo, 1972;
  - The stained-glass windows of Chagall 1957-1970 New York: Tudor Pub. Co., 1973, ISBN 978-0-8148-0565-7
- Pentecôte, roman, Gallimard, 1973.
  - Pentecost: a novel. Translated by David Ellis. Exile Editions, Ltd. 1979. ISBN 978-0-920428-14-6.
- Atlante, poème, Montréal, L’Hexagone, 1976; Toronto, Exile, 1979.
  - Atlante. Translated by Barry Callaghan. Exile Editions, Ltd. 1979. ISBN 978-0-920428-16-0.
- Traité du blanc et des teintures, poème, Montréal, Erta, 1978; Toronto, Exile, 1980.
  - Eidolon: two long poems : Treatise on white and tincture, and Atlante. Translated by Barry Callaghan. Exile Editions, Ltd. 1990. ISBN 978-0-920428-88-7. "robert marteau."
- Salamander, anthologie poétique bilingue, Princeton, Princeton University Press, 1979.
- Mont-Royal, journal, Gallimard, 1981.
  - Mount Royal. Translated by David Homel. Exile Editions, Ltd. 1982. ISBN 978-0-920428-40-5.
  - Interlude. Exile Editions, Ltd. 1982. ISBN 978-0-920428-43-6. "robert marteau."
- Fleuve sans fin - Journal du Saint-Laurent, journal, Gallimard, 1986, réédition, «La petite Vermillon», La Table Ronde, 1994
  - River without end: a logbook of the Saint Lawrence. Translated by David Homel. Exile Editions, Ltd. 1987. ISBN 978-0-920428-94-8.
- Sur le motif, journal, Seyssel, Champ Vallon, 1986, ISBN 978-2-903528-73-7
  - Voyage to Vendée. Translated by David Homel. Exile Editions, Ltd. 1988. ISBN 978-0-920428-96-2.
- Venise en miroir, Quimper, Calligrammes, 1987
- Vigie, Quimper, Calligrammes, 1987
- Voyage au verso, Champ Vallon, 1989, ISBN 978-2-87673-066-3
- Ce que corneille crie, poésie, Champ Vallon, 1989
- Comte de Villamediana : poésies, traduction, « Orphée »/La Différence, 1989
- Forestières, Paris, Métailié, 1990
- Fragments de la France, Champ Vallon, 1990, ISBN 978-2-87673-092-2
- Luis de Góngora, Première Solitude, traduction, « Orphée »/La Différence, 1991
- Le Jour qu’on a tué le cochon, roman, Champ Vallon, 1991
  - Pig-skinning. Translated by David Homel. Exile Editions, Ltd. 1984. ISBN 978-0-920428-89-4.; Exile Editions, Ltd. 2006, ISBN 978-1-55096-038-9
- Cortège pour le Corbeau, poésie, Quimper, Calligrammes, 1991
- Liturgie, Champ Vallon, 1992, ISBN 978-2-87673-153-0
- Huit peintres, La Table Ronde, 1994
- Etudes pour une muse, Champ Vallon, 1995
- Royaumes - Travaux sur la terre - Sibylles (réédition), « Orphée »/La Différence, 1995
- La Récolte de la rosée, la tradition alchimique dans la littérature, Paris, « L’Extrême contemporain », Belin, 1995
- Louanges, poésie, Champ Vallon, 1996
- Le Louvre entrouvert. Editions Champ Vallon. 1997. ISBN 978-2-87673-256-8.
- Registre, poésie, Champ Vallon, 1999, ISBN 978-2-87673-280-3
- La Couleur du temps, livre d'artiste réalisé en collaboration avec le peintre Georges Badin, éditions Alin Anseew, 2001
- Rites et offrandes, Champ Vallon, 2002m ISBN 978-2-87673-342-8
- Dans l'herbe, Champ Vallon, 2006, ISBN 9782876734340
- Sur le Sable, chroniques taurines, Editions Mémoire Vivante, 2007
- Le Temps ordinaire, Champ Vallon, 2009, ISBN 978-2-87673-511-8
- Entre Sable et Ciel, Editions Mémoire Vivante, 2010
