= The Christmas Tree (1969 film) =

- Directed by: Terence Young
- Screenplay by: Terence Young
- Based on: The Christmas Tree by Michel Bataille
- Produced by: Robert Dorfmann
- Starring: William Holden; Virna Lisi; Bourvil; Brook Fuller
- Cinematography: Henri Alekan
- Edited by: Monique Bonnot
- Music by: Georges Auric
- Color process: Eastmancolor
- Production companies: Les Films Corona; Jupiter Generale Cinematografica
- Distributed by: Valoria Films
- Release date: 25 September 1969 (New York City)
- Running time: 108 minutes
- Countries: France; Italy
- Language: French

L'Arbre de Noël (internationally released as The Christmas Tree) is a 1969 French-Italian drama film directed by Terence Young and starring William Holden, Bourvil and Virna Lisi. It was defined as "the most tearful film of sixties". The film was co-produced by Italy where it was released as L'albero di Natale.

== Plot ==
The story follows a Frenchman named Laurent Ségur and his son Pascal, who live somewhere in France. Along the way, the widower Laurent meets and falls for the beautiful Catherine Graziani, but also learns that his son is dying after witnessing the explosion of a plane with a nuclear device inside. Finding this out, Laurent and Pascal have a string of adventures with Catherine along.

== Cast ==
- William Holden as Laurent Ségur
- Bourvil as Verdun
- Virna Lisi as Catherine Graziani
- Madeleine Damien as Marinette
- Mario Feliciani as Le docteur
- Friedrich von Ledebur as Vernet
- Georges Douking as L'animalier
- Michel Thomass as L'ami corse
- Jean-Pierre Castaldi as Le motard de la gendermerie
- Yves Barsacq as Charlie le Breton
- France Daunic as La monitrice
- Brook Fuller as Pascal Ségur

== Production ==
Principal photography began on 11 February 1969. Filming locations included the Château de Castellane (Alpes-de-Haute-Provence), Corsica, Paris, Saint-Tropez (Var), Senlis (Oise), Studios de Billancourt (Hauts-de-Seine) and Studios de La Victorine in Nice (Alpes-Maritimes).

== Release ==
The film opened 25 September 1969 at Radio City Music Hall in New York City. It grossed $200,000 in its opening week.

== See also ==
- List of Christmas films
- List of French films of 1969
