= Christian Fouchet =

French politician (1911–1974)

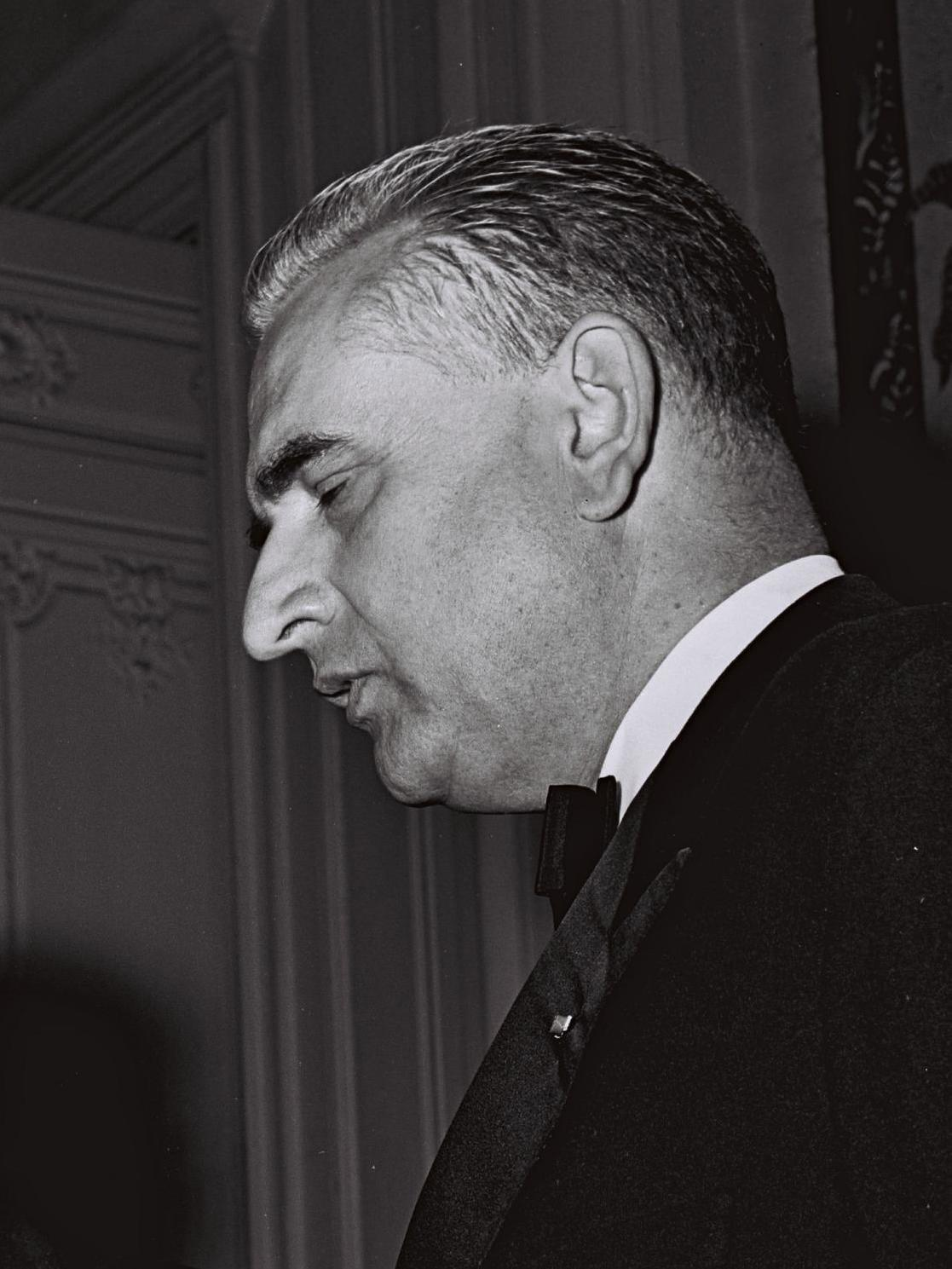

Minister of the Interior
- In office 6 April 1967 – 31 May 1968
- President: Charles de Gaulle
- Prime Minister: Georges Pompidou
- Preceded by: Roger Frey
- Succeeded by: Raymond Marcellin

Minister of National Education
- In office 28 November 1962 – 6 April 1967
- President: Charles de Gaulle
- Prime Minister: Georges Pompidou
- Preceded by: Louis Joxe
- Succeeded by: Alain Peyrefitte

High Commissioner of French Algeria
- In office 19 March 1962 – 3 July 1962
- President: Charles de Gaulle
- Preceded by: Jean Morin
- Succeeded by: Republic declared

Minister for Moroccan and Tunisian Affairs
- In office 18 June 1954 – 5 February 1955
- President: René Coty
- Prime Minister: Pierre Mendès France
- Preceded by: Position established
- Succeeded by: Pierre July

Personal details
- Born: Christian Marie Joseph Fouchet; 17 November 1911 Saint-Germain-en-Laye, Seine-et-Oise, France
- Died: 11 August 1974 (aged 62) Geneva, Switzerland
- Resting place: Père Lachaise Cemetery
- Party: Rally of the French People; Union for the New Republic; Union of Democrats for the Republic
- Children: Lorraine Fouchet

Christian Marie Joseph Fouchet (French pronunciation: [kʁistjɑ̃ fuʃɛ]; 17 November 1911 – 11 August 1974) was a French politician.

== Biography ==
The son of a cavalry officer, Fouchet was born in Saint-Germain-en-Laye, Seine-et-Oise (today Yvelines). He graduated from the École libre des sciences politiques with a degree in law and a diploma in political economy.

Shortly before the outbreak of World War II, Fouchet was mobilized into the French Air Force. After Marshal Philippe Pétain's request for an armistice with Nazi Germany on 17 June 1940, Fouchet boarded a London-bound British airplane to offer his services to General Charles de Gaulle and the Free French forces; after further training, he was made a sub-lieutenant in the Free French Air Forces. His missions primarily involved liaison work between the Free French in London and the resistance movement in France. Fouchet received his first diplomatic assignment in 1944, when he was assigned as a secretary at the French embassy in Moscow. In 1945 he represented de Gaulle's provisional government before the provisional Polish government in Lublin. He subsequently served as Consul General in India until 1947, and then as a member of the directing committee of the Rally of the French People (RPF) until 1951.

From 1951, Fouchet served as a deputy for the RPF in the National Assembly, and from 1954 to 1955, he was Minister for Moroccan and Tunisian Affairs in the government of Pierre Mendès France. After losing his seat in the National Assembly following the 1956 legislative election, Fouchet entered into foreign service. He was appointed French ambassador to Denmark on 12 July 1958 and would serve as such until 1962. In 1961–1962 he was tasked by de Gaulle with drafting the so-called Fouchet Plan, a proposal consisting of an intergovernmental "Union of States" as an alternative to the European Communities, whose increasing development towards a supranational union was viewed negatively by de Gaulle; the plan failed due to lack of support from other states, and opposition from the Benelux countries.

From 19 March to 3 July 1962, Fouchet served as the last French colonial head of Algeria, following the Évian Accords. After his return to France, Fouchet was Minister of National Education from 28 November 1962 to 6 April 1967, and Minister of the Interior from 6 April 1967 to 31 May 1968, in the government of Georges Pompidou; he was forced to resign from the latter office after dispatching large numbers of riot troops to quell the protests of May 68.

Described as a staunch Gaullist, Fouchet left the Union of Democrats for the Republic (UDR) in 1971, as he viewed the party as drifting away from the ideological heritage of de Gaulle. He died of a heart attack in Geneva in 1974.

Fouchet was made a member of the Legion of Honour, as a knight in 1946 and as a commander in 1961. He was also awarded the Croix de Guerre, the Croix de la Valeur Militaire, the Croix of the Veterans of Foreign Wars, the Medal of the Resistance and the Medal of Free France.

== Personal life ==
Fouchet married Colette Vautrin in 1955; they had one daughter, novelist Lorraine Fouchet.

== Honours and awards ==
=== National honours ===
- Legion of Honour
  - Knight (18 June 1946)
  - Commander (1 April 1961)
- Resistance Medal (26 August 1946)
- Commemorative medal for voluntary service in Free France
- Croix de Guerre 1939–1945
- Cross for Military Valour with Gold Star

=== Foreign honours ===
- (Morocco) Grand Officer of the Order of Ouissam Alaouite (1954)
- Grand Cross of the Order of the Sun of Peru (20 August 1963)

Political offices
Preceded by Louis Joxe	Minister of National Education of France; 1962–1967	Succeeded by Alain Peyrefitte
Preceded by Roger Frey	Minister of the Interior; 1967–1968	Succeeded by Raymond Marcellin
