= Le Boulevard périphérique =

2008 novel by Henry Bauchau

- Author: Henry Bauchau
- Language: French
- Publisher: Actes Sud
- Publication date: 2008
- Publication place: Belgium

Le Boulevard périphérique is a Belgian novel by Henry Bauchau. It was first published in 2008. It won the Prix du Livre Inter and was short-listed for the Prix France Culture-Télérama in 2008.

== Editions ==
- Le Boulevard périphérique, Actes Sud, 2008 ISBN 978-2-7427-7169-1.
