= Catherine Hermary-Vieille =

French writer (born 1943)

Catherine Hermary-Vieille (French pronunciation: [katʁin ɛʁmaʁi vjɛj]; born 8 October 1943, 15th arrondissement of Paris) is a French writer, and winner of the Prix Femina 1981, for Le Grand Vizir de la nuit.

== Work ==
=== Novels ===
==== Series Les Dames de Brières ====
- 2001: Les Dames de Brières, Ed. Albin Michel; Le Livre de Poche Librairie Générale Française (LGF)
- 2001: Les Dames de Brières Tome II : L'étang du diable, Albin Michel; (LGF)
- 2002: Les Dames de Brières Tome III : La fille du feu, Albin Michel; (LGF)

==== Series Le Crépuscule des rois ====
- 2002: Le Crépuscule des rois Tome I : La rose d'Anjou, Albin Michel; (LGF)
- 2003: Le Crépuscule des rois Tome II : Les reines de cœur, Albin Michel; (LGF)
- 2004: Le Crépuscule des rois Tome III : Les lionnes d'Angleterre, Albin Michel; (LGF)

==== Other novels ====
- 1981: Le Grand Vizir de la nuit, Gallimard; Folio
- 1983: La Marquise des ombres, Olivier Orban; Folio
- 1984: L'Épiphanie des dieux, Gallimard; Folio
- 1987: L'Infidèle, Gallimard; Folio
- 1991: Le Jardin des Henderson, Gallimard; Folio
- 1991: Un amour fou, Olivier Orban; Pocket
- 1992: Le Rivage des adieux, Pygmalion; (LGF)
- 1994: La Piste des turquoises, Flammarion; (LGF)
- 1995: La Pointe aux tortues, Flammarion; (LGF)
- 1996: Lola, Plon; Pocket
- 1998: L'Initié, Plon; Pocket
- 2003: La Bourbonnaise, Albin Michel; (LGF)
- 2006: Lord James, Albin Michel
- 2007: Le Gardien du phare, Albin Michel
- 2008: Le Roman d'Alia, Albin Michel
- 2009: Les Années Trianon, Albin Michel
- 2011: Merveilleuses, Albin Michel
- 2013: Le Siècle de Dieu, Albin Michel
- 2014: La Bête, Albin Michel
- 2016: D'OR et de SANG, Albin Michel

=== Biography ===
- 1986: Romy, Olivier Orban

== Prizes ==
- 1981: Prix Femina for Le Grand Vizir de la nuit
- 1984: Prix Georges Dupau awarded by the Académie Française
- 1991: Prix Maison de la Presse for Un amour fou
- Grand Prix RTL pour L'Infidèle
