= François Salvaing =

French journalist and writer

François Salvaing (born 1943 in Casablanca) is a French journalist and writer, laureate of the Prix du Livre Inter in 1988.

== Biography ==
François Salvaing was born in Morocco, then a French Protectorate. After studying literature in Paris, in 1974 he joined L'Humanité, the daily newspaper of the French Communist Party (PCF), as a journalist. He has been a PCF member since 1968.

In 2000, François Salvaing published by Stock a large volume entitled Parti, in which the novelist transposed his experience as a journalist into the character of Frederic Sans.

== Work ==
- 1989: De purs désastres
- 1988: Misayre ! Misayre !, Prix du Livre Inter
- 1990: Le tour du Tour par trente-six détours, éditions Messidor, ISBN 2-209-06301-9
- 1991: Une vie de rechange
- 1994: La Nuda
- 1996: Vendredi treizième chambre
- 1998: La Boîte
- 2000: Parti, Stock, ISBN 2-234-05262-9
- 2004: Le Cœur trouble and other short stories
- 2006: Jourdain
- 2007: Un alibi de rêve
- 2008: Maud et Matilda
- 2010: De purs désastres, édition aggravée
- 2012: Un amour au pied du mur
- 2014: 818 jours
