= Hortense Dufour =

French writer

Hortense Dufour (born 1946 in Saintes) is a French writer. She spent her childhood and youth in Marennes, Charente-Maritime.

== Biography ==
Dufour is the daughter of a French magistrate and an Italian musician. She spent three years in Madagascar and Comoros. A great traveler, she went to Europe, England, Ireland, United States, Maghreb countries, etc.

In Paris, she studied modern literature. She was devoted to writing from childhood: "I always wrote," she said. "It fell on me as Grace" .. "A day without writing has always been for me a day that has not existed My blood has become ink."

She was discovered at age 22 by publisher Jean-Jacques Pauvert.

Dufour also participated in the reading committee of Éditions Robert Laffont and collaborated with the Bayard Presse group and other magazines in the form of articles. She is the mother of three children.

She is the author of numerous novels and biographies devoted to Calamity Jane, la Comtesse de Ségur, Cleopatra, Marie-Antoinette, Nero, Colette, George Sand, Marie Stuart, Sissi, la Reine Margot, Joan of Arc and Madame de Pompadour. On this subject she declared: "Biographies are my permission to continue writing, novel is history, and history is also a novel." She was awarded the Grand prix des lectrices de Elle in 1978 for her novelLa Marie-Marraine", translated into several languages and adapted to the screen by Robert Enrico under the title L'Empreinte des géants. She received the Prix du Livre Inter in 1983 for her novel Le Bouchot. She presided the Prix du Livre Inter jury in May 1984. She was awarded the Grand Prix de l'Académie de Saintonge et Médaille de Chardonne in 1990 for La fille du saunier. In 2006, Le bois des abeilles won the Prix des Mouettes Offered by the General Council of Charente-Maritime. Hortense Dufour has been several times the guest of the emblematic TV program Apostrophes by Bernard Pivot. She is also the author of numerous scenarios for TF1 and FR3. The Order of Knight of Arts and Letters was presented to him in July 2010 by the Minister of Culture and Communication. She participated in several parts of the TV program Secrets d'histoire hosted by Stéphane Bern: Cléopâtre pouvait-elle échapper au suicide ? (2007), Marie Stuart : reine martyre ou manipulatrice (2007), Catherine de Médicis, l'intrigante des châteaux de la Loire (2008), Henri IV : le roi de cœur (2009), Sissi impératrice : amour, gloire et tragédie (2011) and Louis II de Bavière, le roi perché (2016).

The Prix Hortense Dufour - the godmother of the multimedia library of Marennes - was created in 2010 by the Lions Club of Marennes-Oléron. This prize rewards a first or a second novel. It is given by Hortense Dufour to the author at the municipal library of Marennes. The six first "Prix Hortense Dufour" were:

- 2010: L'emprise by Sarah Chiche, Grasset
- 2011: Hôtel Argentina by Pierre Stasse, Flammarion
- 2012: Ce qu'il advint du sauvage blanc by François Garde, Gallimard
- 2013: Pour l'honneur de Blanche by Frédérique Volot, Presses de la Cité
- 2014: Moment d'un coupl by Nelly Alard, Gallimard
- 2015: La chance que tu as by Denis Michelis, Stock

== Works ==
- 1971: La femme buissonnière, Jean-Jacques Pauvert
- 1976: La dernière femme de Barbe-Bleue, Grasset, translated into German, 1977
- 1978: La Marie-Marraine, Grasset, Grand prix des lectrices de Elle, translated into several languages, adapted to the screen by Robert Enrico under the title L'Empreinte des géants
- 1980: La guenon qui pleure, Grasset
- 1981: L’écureuil dans la roue, Grasset, adapted to cinema in 1983, by Alain Maline under the title Ni avec toi, ni sans toi
- 1982: Le Bouchot, Grasset - Prix du Livre Inter 1983
- 1984: Le tournis, Grasset
- 1985 Jardins-Labyrinthes (with Georges Vignaux), Grasset
- 1986: Capitaine Dragée, Grasset
- 1987: Le Diable Blanc (Le roman de Calamity Jane), Flammarion
- 1887: La Garde du cocon, Flammarion
- 1989: Le Château d’absence, Flammarion
- 1990: Comtesse de Ségur, née Rostopchine, Flammarion - J'ai lu, 2002 ISBN 2290317845
- 1992: La fille du saulnier, Grasset, Grand prix de l'Académie de Saintonge, le livre de poche
- 1993: La jupière de Meaux, Grasset
- 1995: L’arbre à perruque, Grasset
- 1996: Saint Expédit, le jeune homme de ma vie, Bayard presse
- 1996: La cinquième saison (la vie du grand chef sioux Sitting Bull), Seuil Jeunesse, 1996, Prix Enfantasia de la ville de Genève
- 1997: Salve Regina, Éditions du Rocher
- 1997: Eléonore par-dessus les moulins, Éditions du Rocher
- 1995: Cléopâtre la fatale, Flammarion
- 1998: Charivari, Seuil
- 1988: Le perroquet de Tarbes, Éditions du Rocher
- 1999: Moi, Néron, Flammarion - Poche ISBN 2080675672
- 2000: Colette, La vagabonde assise, Grande Biographie, Éditions du Rocher, ISBN 2268034747
- 2001: Marie-Antoinette, la mal-aimée, Biographie, Flammarion - J'ai lu, 2003 ISBN 2290323489
- 2001: Mademoiselle Noémie, Seuil
- 2001: Un si grand objet d'amour, Éditions du Rocher ISBN 2268039129
- 2002: George Sand la somnambule, Éditions du Rocher - J'ai lu, 2004 ISBN 2290324434
- 2002: Au vent fou de l'esprit, Flammarion, J'ai lu, 2006 ISBN 2290333433
- 2003: Mon vieux Léon, Seuil, ISBN 2020548356
- 2003: Sissi, Les forces du destin, Flammarion
- 2004: L'ange rose, Éditions du Rocher, ISBN 2268052710
- 2005: Le Bois des abeilles, Flammarion, ISBN 2080685341
- 2007: Marie Stuart, Grande Biographie, Éditions du Rocher
- 2008: Ce que l'Océan ne dit pas, Flammarion
- 2010: Margot, la reine rebelle, Grande Biographie, Flammarion
- 2012: Jeanne d'Arc, la chanson et la geste, Flammarion
- 2014: Ces jours heureux, Flammarion
- 2015: Madame de Pompadour, l’amie nécessaire, Flammarion
