= Fouchet Plan =

1961 plan proposed by Charles de Gaulle for a Union of European States

The Fouchet Plan (French: Plan Fouchet) was an unsuccessful plan written by Christian Fouchet, France's ambassador to Denmark, and proposed by French President Charles de Gaulle in 1961 as part of de Gaulle's grand design for Europe at the time. The idea was to form a new 'Union of States' between France, Italy, Germany and the Benelux countries, an intergovernmental alternative to the European Communities which had been created a few years prior. De Gaulle feared a loss of French national influence in the Communities, which were becoming increasingly supranational so the plan was an attempt to keep the balance of power in France's favor. The success of the European Communities and the lack of enthusiasm of other states for the idea stopped the implementation of the Fouchet Plan.

== Planned organisation ==
=== First draft ===
The first draft of The Fouchet Plan was proposed in 1961. The plan called for a "Union of the European peoples" "without supranational institutions." It is divided into five sections ("Titles I – V"), summarized below. Title I outlines the "aims" of the Union. Title II describes the institutions, their composition, and their various powers and relationships to one another. Title III describes the "Obligations of Member States". Title IV describes the Finances of the Union, and Title V describes General provisions.

==== Title I – Union of the European peoples ====
The plan set forth two major aims of the Union: a common foreign policy and a common defence policy. Other aims of the Union were the development of the "common heritage" of the Member States and "the protection of the values on which their civilization rests".

==== Title II – Institutions ====
The plan proposed three institutions of the Union: a "Council", a "European Parliament", and a "European Political Commission."

The Council would deliberate on questions posed by Member States and adopt decisions unanimously. However, if one or two members are absent, it would "not prevent a decision from being taken." The Council would meet twice every four months, once at the Head of State or Government level and once at the Foreign Minister level. De Gaulle proposed that the decisions of the council be binding on Member States, but did not propose a method of enforcement. Should a Member State abstain from the adoption of a decision, that decision would not be enforced on that state. However, these states would be able to opt in at any time.

The parliament would deliberate "on matters concerning the aims of the Union", as outlined in Title I, Article II. It would submit recommendations and would address oral or written questions to the Council. The Council would be free to act independently of the parliament, but must reply to parliament recommendations within four months.

The main role of the Political Commission of the Union would be to assist the Council by preparing its deliberations, carrying out its decisions, and performing the duties the Council entrusts to it. The Commission would consist of "senior officials of the Foreign Affairs departments of each Member State."

==== Title III – Obligations of Member States ====
Title III called for cooperation between the Member States, mandating that they work towards the aims of the Union.

==== Title IV – Finances of the Union ====
The budget of the Union would be "drawn up by the Council each year", and would be funded by contributions from the Member States. Article 13 lays out the proportional contribution of each Member State at the time.

==== Title V – General provisions ====
Title V lays out how amendments should be made to the Plan, how they would be ratified, provisions for admission of new Member states, and other standard details.

=== Second draft ===
A second draft of the Fouchet plan was proposed when it appeared that the first would prove unsuccessful. Some concessions would have to be made in terms of what de Gaulle wanted for the union, its structure, and the French role. Much like the original Fouchet plan, the second draft continued to push for intergovernmental structures. It highlighted the importance of the individual member states. The second draft aimed at common interests among certain states, rather than ensuring their close cooperation in predetermined fields. The second draft also called for a structural change through the addition of Committees of Ministers. Two committees are explicitly mentioned: a committee for foreign affairs and a committee for education. These two groups were to meet four times a year and would be under the supervision of the proposed council. The council would also be able to create new committees when they deemed it necessary. Lastly, although it is not emphasized, France's role was slightly diminished and the European Political Commission would no longer meet in Paris.

== Charles De Gaulle's role ==
The driving political force behind the Fouchet Plan was French President Charles de Gaulle. Concerned about the growing supranational tendencies of the European Economic Community, he sought to implement a new intergovernmental vision of cooperation which would put decision-making power back into the hands of the nation-states. After convincing the other five heads of state to agree to regular meetings, de Gaulle pushed the idea of further political cooperation. Headed by the French ambassador to Denmark, Christian Fouchet, a committee assembled to discuss the French recommendations. All of the suggestions put forward increased the intergovernmental nature of the organization, but the first draft of the plan also included a provision for a common foreign policy. This last aspect is especially telling: while the rest of "The Six" valued their membership in NATO, de Gaulle made no effort to hide his hostility towards it and what he considered to be undue American influence in Europe.

== Reactions ==
=== Konrad Adenauer ===
In 1959, when de Gaulle began to focus his attention away from France and Algeria and more on Europe as a whole, he began to propose more regular meetings of the six member states. He also suggested that the meetings be backed by a secretariat. West Germany and Italy in particular looked favourably on these proposals. However, when de Gaulle first introduced the Fouchet Plan in 1961, it faced opposition from many of the member states. Adenauer and de Gaulle had a close relationship and during de Gaulle's term in office, Franco-German relations improved significantly. However Adenauer and his Dutch counterparts were worried that the Fouchet Plan would divert power from the EEC and NATO.

West Germany was also opposed to de Gaulle's idea that the plans be ratified by popular referendum on the grounds that it was not constitutional. Despite Adenauer's friendship with de Gaulle, West Germany was never convinced that the Fouchet Plan was the best course of action. However, though the plan fell through, Adenauer and de Gaulle were able to establish the Treaty of Friendship in 1963 to strengthen ties between France and West Germany. This agreement would not only be beneficial to the French and West Germans, but also the entire EEC.

=== Benelux ===
Belgium, the Netherlands, and Luxembourg, collectively known as Benelux, were against the Fouchet Plan. They were afraid that the proposal removed too much power from the Commission, the supranational governing body, and would rely heavily on intergovernmentalism. They worried that the Fouchet Plan would weaken the Treaty of Rome and would be a step away from integration. The downgrade in power would have afforded France more opportunity to influence the other nations. Benelux feared that this would allow de Gaulle and France to dominate the EEC and push issues important to their own national interests.

A second main issue was the speed with which France was trying to force the plan through. The Benelux countries thought that a decision of this magnitude should be deferred until after Britain's accession talks, which started in 1961, were completed. De Gaulle had been speaking closely with German Chancellor Adenauer at this time and Benelux worried that the collaboration of the two countries would shift the power of an intergovernmental organization towards France and West Germany. British accession would have balanced the power structure within the EEC more equally and would not have allowed France to dominate the talks.

The Netherlands in particular thought that the Fouchet Plan was an attempt to subvert the power of NATO. The Plan's common defence policy would have directly conflicted with NATO's mission and directives, so the Netherlands worried that the plan was an attempt to weaken NATO's influence and to reassert France as a military power.

== Literature ==
- Bloes, Robert. "Le ‘Plan Fouchet’ et le Problème de l'Europe Politique." Studies in Contemporary European Issues 5. Brussels: College of Europe. (1970): 538.
- Camps, Miriam. "The Six and Political Union" The World Today 20.11 (Nov., 1964): 473-480.
- Moravcsik, Andrew. "De Gaulle Between Grain and Grandeur: The Political Economy of French EC Policy, 1958-1970." Journal of Cold War Studies 2.2 (2000): 3-43.
- Moravcsik, Andrew. "Beyond Grain and Grandeur: An Answer to Critics and an Agenda for Future Research." Journal of Cold War Studies 2.3 (2000): 117-142.
- Teasdale, Anthony L. "The Fouchet Plan: De Gaulle's Intergovernmental Design for Europe", July 2013, available at * http://penguincompaniontoeu.com/fouchet-plan/
- Vanke, Jeffrey W. "An Impossible Union: Dutch Objections to the Fouchet Plan, 1959-62." Cold War History 2.1 (2001): 95.
