= Prix du Livre Inter =

French literary award

The Prix du Livre Inter is a prize for best French novel of the year. It is awarded by the radio channel France Inter. It was established in 1975 at the initiative of Paul-Louis Mignon.

== List of recipients ==
Year	Title	Author	Publisher	Jury president
1975	Des demeures et des gens	Catherine d'Etchéa	Éditions de la Table ronde	Pierre Emmanuel
1976	Le Ravenala ou l'Arbre du voyageur	Jacques Perry	Albin Michel	Maurice Genevoix
1977	Ana non	Agustín Gómez-Arcos	Stock	Alain Peyrefitte
1978	L'Enfant de Bohème	Daniel Boulanger	Gallimard	Robert Sabatier
1979	La Décharge	Béatrix Beck	Le Sagittaire	Alain Decaux
1980	The Testament	Elie Wiesel	Seuil	Maurice Denuzière
1981	Les Demoiselles de Beaumoreau	Marguerite Gurgand	éditions Mazarine	Françoise Mallet-Joris
1982	La Lumière du Nord	Marcel Schneider	Grasset	Jeanne Bourin
1983	Le Bouchot	Hortense Dufour	Grasset	François Nourissier
1984	La Mémoire d'Abraham	Marek Halter	Laffont	Hortense Dufour
1985	Un cauchemar	Jean-Jacques Brochier	Albin Michel	Michèle Perrein
1986	L'Enfer	René Belletto	Éditions P.O.L	Jean-Noël Jeanneney
1987	Who Will Remember the People... (Qui se souvient des hommes...)	Jean Raspail	Laffont	Henri Troyat
1988	Misayre ! Misayre !	François Salvaing	éditions Balland	Jacques Laurent
1989	Petite Chronique des gens de nuit dans un port de l'Atlantique Nord	Philippe Hadengue	Maren Sell	Érik Orsenna
1990	La Petite Marchande de prose	Daniel Pennac	Gallimard	Paul Guimard
1991	La Voyeuse interdite	Nina Bouraoui	Gallimard	Jean d'Ormesson
1992	Le Troisième Mensonge	Agota Kristof	Seuil	Hector Bianciotti
1993	Des choses idiotes et douces	Frédéric Boyer	P.O.L.	Michel Del Castillo
1994	Quoi de neuf sur la guerre ?	Robert Bober	P.O.L.	Yves Simon
1995	Madame Arnoul	Jean-Noël Pancrazi	Gallimard	Paule Constant
1996	Un secret sans importance	Agnès Desarthe	éditions de l'Olivier	Jorge Semprún
1997	Instruments des ténèbres	Nancy Huston	Actes Sud	Jean Vautrin
1998	La Maladie de Sachs	Martin Winckler	P.O.L.	Daniel Pennac
1999	En attendant le vote des bêtes sauvages	Ahmadou Kourouma	Seuil	JMG Le Clézio
2000	Des anges mineurs	Antoine Volodine	Seuil	Jean Rouaud
2001	Apprendre à finir	Laurent Mauvignier	éditions de Minuit	Marie Darrieussecq
2002	Un soir au club	Christian Gailly	éditions de Minuit	Philippe Djian
2003	La Petite Chartreuse	Pierre Péju	Gallimard	Emmanuel Carrère
2004	L'Homme-sœur	Patrick Lapeyre	P.O.L.	Nancy Huston
2005	L'Étourdissement	Joël Egloff	Buchet/Chastel	Olivier Rolin
2006	La Chambre de la Stella	Jean-Baptiste Harang	Grasset	Jean Echenoz
2007	Ouest	François Vallejo	Éditions Viviane Hamy	Camille Laurens
2008	Le Boulevard périphérique	Henry Bauchau	Actes Sud	Alberto Manguel
2009	Zone	Mathias Enard	Actes Sud	Marc Dugain
2010	Les Hommes-couleurs	Cloé Korman	Seuil	Catherine Clément
2011	Que font les rennes après Noël ?	Olivia Rosenthal	Éditions Verticales	Amin Maalouf
2012	Supplément à la vie de Barbara Loden	Nathalie Léger	P.O.L.	Amélie Nothomb
2013	Sombre Dimanche	Alice Zeniter	Albin Michel	Geneviève Brisac
2014	Faillir être flingué	Céline Minard	Éditions Rivages	Alain Mabanckou
2015	Jacob, Jacob	Valérie Zenatti	L'Olivier (2)	Jean-Christophe Rufin
2016	7	Tristan Garcia	Gallimard (6)	Agnès Desarthe
2017	Règle animal	Jean-Baptiste Del Amo	Gallimard	Elisabeth Badinter
2018	Fief	David Lopez	Seuil	Leïla Slimani
2019	Arcadie	Emmanuelle Bayamack-Tam	Éditions P.O.L	Riad Sattouf
2020	Avant que j'oublie	Anne Pauly	Editions Verdier	Philippe Lançon
2021	Un jour ce sera vide	Hugo Lindenberg	Christian Bourgois éditeur	Dany Laferrière
2022	Mahmoud ou la montée des eaux	Antoine Wauters	Editions Verdier	Delphine de Vigan
