= Catherine d'Etchéa =

Catherine d'Etchéa, pen name of Paulette Boudet, (1920 – 2 March 2007) was a French writer, laureate of the Prix du Livre Inter in 1975.

== Selected works ==
- 1975: Des demeures et des gens, short stories, Éditions Gallimard, Prix du Livre Inter
- 1976: Personnes publiques, vies privées, Éditions de la Table ronde
- 1988: Ce combat n'est pas le tien, Fayard, ISBN 9782213022253
