= Jean-Baptiste Harang =

French writer and journalist

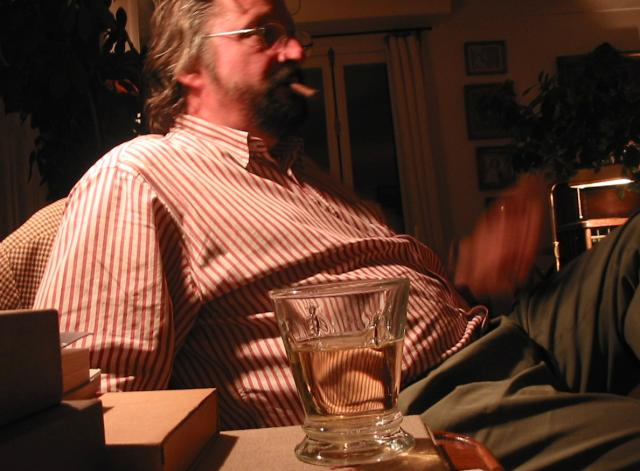
Jean-Baptiste Harang in 2002.

Jean-Baptiste Harang (born 4 April 1949 in Chaulgnes, Nièvre) is a French writer and journalist.

== Life ==
Jean-Baptiste Harang started working as a journalist at Libération in 1978 before he held the literary critic column from 1998 to 2007. He later worked for Le Magazine Littéraire.

He published his first novel, Le Contraire du coton, in 1993 and received the Inter Book Prize in 2007 for La Chambre de la Stella, an autobiographical novel whose plot is located at Dun-le-Palestel (in Creuse), the native village of his paternal family.

== Work ==
- 1993: Le Contraire du coton, éditions Grasset
- 1994: Les Spaghettis d'Hitler, éd. Grasset
- 1996: Gros Chagrin, éd. Grasset
- 1998: Théodore disparaît, éd. Grasset
- 2004: L’art est difficile, éditions Julliard
- 2006: La Chambre de la Stella, éd. Grasset – Inter Book Prize 2007
- 2008: Prenez un coq : Trente-cinq façons de passer du coq à l'âne à lire au jour le jour, éditions Verdier
- 2009: Olivier Estoppey : L'Homme des lisières : Du dessin à l'installation monumentale, avec Nicolas Raboud et Pierre Starobinski
- 2006: Nos cœurs vaillants, éd. Grasset – Jean-Giono Jury Prize 2010
- 2013: Bordeaux-Vintimille, éd. Grasset - Prix Henri de Régnier, bestowed by the Académie française in 2013
