= Nicole Ciravégna =

French writer (1925–2011)

Nicole Ciravégna (1925–2011) was a French writer. She was born in Nice to a family of Piedmontese origin. She studied in Aubagne and Marseille. She taught literature at the Lycée Michelet in the south of France.

She is best known for her books for children and young adults. One of her best known books is Les Trois jours du Cavalier (1980) which won the Prix André Barré and the Prix Maison de la Presse. She also wrote several books featuring the child character "Chichois".

Most of her stories are set in her native Provence. She lived in Marseille where she died in 2011. She received the Chevalier des Palmes Académiques for her contributions to education and literature.

== Works ==
- La Rue qui descend vers la mer, édition Magnard, 1971.
- Aldo et Sarah, édition Magnard, 1973.
- Temps d'été, temps d'aimer, Hachette, 1973.
- La Nuit de Saraou, Hachette, 1974.
- Le Sentier sous les herbes, éditions Magnard, 1974.
- Le Pavé d'amour, éditions Magnard, 1975.
- La Falaise des cavaliers, Hachette, 1976.
- César, poisson marseillais, éditions Magnard, 1977.
- Le Colchique et l'étoile, édition Magnard, 1978.
- Le Navire de pierre, éditions Magnard, 1978.
- Chichois de la rue des Mauvestis, Bordas, 1979.
- Les Trois Jours du cavalier, éditions du Seuil, 1979, prix André-Barré de l'Académie française en 1980
- L'Île blanche, éditions du Quai, 1982.
- Les Tambours de la nuit, éditions Magnard, 1982.
- Une nuit de Gaspard de Besse, J. Laffitte, 1988.
- Le Chemin du loup, éditions Autres Temps, 1995.
- Une année de délices éditions Autres Temps, 1997.
- Chichois et Chichois Ier, édition POCKET junior, 1999.
- Le Petit Crieur de journaux, éditions Autres Temps, 2004.
- Le Village englouti, éditions Campanile, 2006.
