= Raymond Marcellin =

French politician (1914–2004)

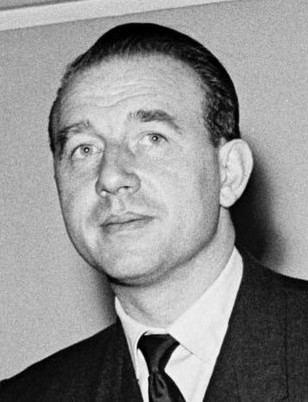
- Raymond Marcellin in 1950

Minister of Agriculture and Rural Development
- In office 1 March 1974 – 28 May 1974
- Prime Minister: Pierre Messmer
- Preceded by: Jacques Chirac
- Succeeded by: Christian Bonnet

Minister of the Interior
- In office 31 May 1968 – 27 February 1974
- Prime Minister: Georges Pompidou; Maurice Couve de Murville; Jacques Chaban-Delmas; Pierre Messmer
- Preceded by: Christian Fouchet
- Succeeded by: Jacques Chirac

Minister of Industry
- In office 8 January 1966 – 6 April 1967
- Prime Minister: Georges Pompidou
- Preceded by: Michel Maurice-Bokanowski
- Succeeded by: Olivier Guichard

Minister of Public Health and Population
- In office 16 May 1962 – 8 January 1966
- Prime Minister: Georges Pompidou
- Preceded by: Joseph Fontanet
- Succeeded by: Jean-Marcel Jeanneney (as Minister of Social Affairs)

Personal details
- Born: 19 August 1914 Sézanne, France
- Died: 8 September 2004 (aged 90) Paris, France
- Party: CNIP; FNRI; PR; UDF
- Education: University of Strasbourg; University of Paris

Raymond Marcellin (French: [ʁɛmɔ̃ maʁsəlɛ̃]; 19 August 1914 – 8 September 2004) was a French politician.

== Biography ==
=== Early life ===
Marcellin was born Sézanne, in the Marne department. The son of a banker, he studied law at the University of Strasbourg and the University of Paris and earned a doctorate. He would become a lawyer at the Court of Appeal of Paris in 1945. Marcellin was mobilised at the outbreak of World War II and captured by the Wehrmacht but managed to escape to the zone libre. He then settled in Vichy France to resume his legal studies.

In 1941 Marcellin joined the Institut des études corporatives et sociales (IECS), a corporatist organization headed by his friend Maurice Bouvier-Ajam and supported by the Vichy regime. Marcellin's task was to diffuse the ideas of the Révolution nationale among youth and professional associations. He was eventually named secretary-general of the IECS in which capacity he received the Order of the Francisque. In addition he taught at the Université-Jeune-France, linked to La Jeune France, a cultural organization under Vichy France. Towards the end of the war, Marcellin switched sides and joining the "Alliance" network of the French Resistance, which was led by Marie-Madeleine Fourcade and Georges Loustaunau-Lacau.

=== Political career ===
Marcellin was elected to the National Assembly in the November 1946 election, where he stood as a Gaullist candidate for Morbihan. He initially belonged to the Republican Party of Liberty (PRL) group in the National Assembly but left it in December 1947. Neither did he join Charles de Gaulle's Rally of the French People (RPF), instead aligning himself with the independents in 1948. In the National Assembly he voted for the socialist governments of Léon Blum in December 1946 and Paul Ramadier in January 1947; however, he withdrew his support over the Organic Statute of Algeria put forward by the latter government in the autumn of 1947. In 1951 he joined the National Centre of Independents and Peasants (CNIP).

During the Fourth Republic, Marcellin successively served as a junior minister in the governments of Henri Queuille, Georges Bidault, Edgar Faure and Antoine Pinay. A staunch anti-communist, his decision to dismiss seven employees of the National Center for Cinematography in 1950 over their membership in the French Communist Party (PCF) or the aligned trade union CGT caused widespread protests and led to a parliamentary inquiry.

After the fall of the Pinay ministry in December 1952, Marcellin stayed out of government service for several years. Although in favour of continued French presence in Indochina, he abstained from voting against a French withdrawal at the end of the First Indochina War in June 1954. Though opposed to the government of Guy Mollet, Marcellin was a fierce supporter of French rule in Algeria, approved the government's policies in the Algerian War and voted to grant it special powers to be used against the FLN in 1956.

Marcellin voted to elect de Gaulle as prime minister in June 1958. A close associate of Georges Pompidou, he would serve in several ministerial positions under Pompidou's tenure as prime minister from 1962 to 1968, including as minister of public health and of industry. Marcellin also served as mayor of Vannes from 1965 to 1977.

=== Interior minister ===
Following the events of May 1968, Marcellin was named as minister of the interior to replace Christian Fouchet. De Gaulle commented his appointment by remarking that "now we have the real Fouché" in reference to Joseph Fouché, the authoritarian police minister under Napoleon Bonaparte after the French Revolution. According to Marcellin, the students and striking workers were either enemies of France or dupes of an operation of the Cuban secret services. He expanded the police budget and pledged a strong increase in the numbers of the force in Paris to establish order. Marcellin did not hesitate to ban demonstrations; when rumours that Maoist activists intended to sabotage the elections of June 1968 reached him, he responded by ordering almost 300 preventive arrests.

Marcellin remained as interior minister in the government of Maurice Couve de Murville. Convinced that French far-left groups, such as the Trotskyist Communist League and the Maoist Gauche prolétarienne, were part of a subversive campaign supported by foreign communist governments and other European far-left organizations, he directed the police to use whatever means at their disposal to carry out repression and gather intelligence on them. He ordered the dissolution of the far-right organization Occident in October 1968, and of the Communist League and the far-right Ordre Nouveau in June 1973. Several left-wing magazines were also banned under Marcellin, such as Tricontinental and La Cause du peuple; in June 1970, Jean-Paul Sartre was notably arrested after having sold the latter magazine in the streets of Paris. Marcellin also banned the display, publicity and sale to minors of the satirical magazine Hara-Kiri in November 1970, following the publication of an issue with the headline "Bal tragique à Colombey: 1 mort" ("Tragic ball at Colombey: 1 dead"), referring to the death of Charles de Gaulle.

In 1971 Marcellin tried to amend the 1901 law guaranteeing freedom of association by requiring preliminary administrative authorization in order to create an association; the amendment was ultimately rejected by the Constitutional Council. In the same year he pushed through an "anti-wreckers' bill", which criminalized mere attendance at a meeting where violence occurred. His methods as interior minister were frequently criticized, including by the French police union.

=== Later career ===
Marcellin was removed as interior minister by President Pompidou on 27 February 1974 after officers of the Directorate of Territorial Surveillance, posing as plumbers, had been caught planting microphones in the offices of the satirical weekly Le Canard Enchaîné. He was replaced by Jacques Chirac and instead appointed minister of agriculture. Following Pompidou's death a few months later, Marcellin refused to serve under the newly-elected President Valéry Giscard d'Estaing and resigned.

Having left his seat in the National Assembly in 1973, Marcellin was elected to the Senate on 22 September 1974, and remained a senator until 21 June 1981. He also served as president of the Regional Council of Brittany from 1978 to 1986. In the 1981 elections Marcellin was again elected to the National Assembly for the Union for French Democracy (UDF) and remained a deputy until his retirement at the age of 82 in 1997. He died in Paris in 2004.

== Honours and awards ==
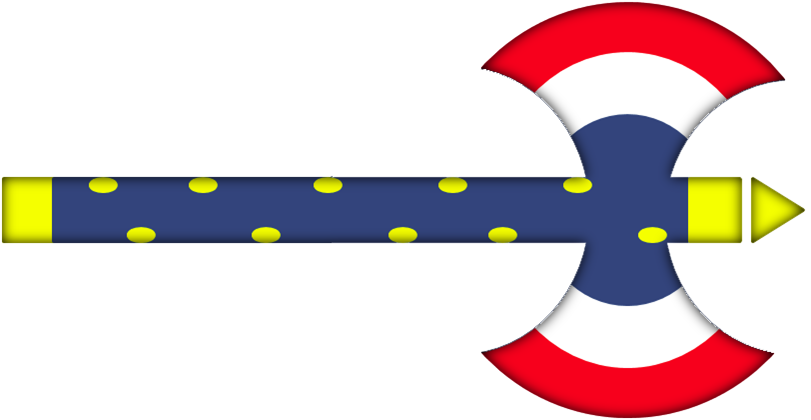
- Order of the Francisque
- Commander of the Order of Public Health (ex officio, 16 May 1962)
- Commander of the Order of Agricultural Merit (ex officio, 1 March 1974)
- Knight of the Legion of Honour (11 July 1997)

== Bibliography ==
- L'Orientation professionnelle et le placement des jeunes, dissertation (Paris: Recueil Sirey, 1941)
- Les Principaux problèmes de l'orientation professionnelle, with Maurice Bouvier-Ajam (Clermont-Ferrand: É. Chiron, 1942)
- L'Ordre public et les groupes révolutionnaires (Paris: Plon, 1969)
- L'Importune vérité (Paris: Plon, 1978)
- La Guerre politique (Paris: Plon, 1985)
- L'Expérience du pouvoir (Paris: La Table ronde, 1990)

Preceded by Christian Fouchet	Minister of the Interior; 1968–1974	Succeeded by Jacques Chirac
