= Arnaud Guillon =

French writer

Arnaud Guillon (born 1964 in Caen) is a contemporary French writer, the winner of the Prix Roger Nimier in 2000 for his novel Écume Palace and the Prix Henri de Régnier in 2015 for Tableau de chasse, une passion très coupable.

== Works ==
- 1993: Tous comptes faits, interview with Pierre Moinot, éditions Quai Voltaire, ISBN 9782876531611
- 1994: Mauvais Genre, interview with François Nourissier realised by Frédéric Badré and Arnaud Guillon, éditions Quai Voltaire, ISBN 978-2876531901
- 1998: Daisy printemps 69, Plon, ISBN 9782259187282
- 2000: Écume Palace, Éditions Arléa, series "1er Mille", ISBN 2869594925 – Prix Roger Nimier
- 2002: 15 août, Arléa, series "1er Mille", ISBN 978-2869595637
- 2005: Près du corps, Plon, ISBN 978-2259201087
- 2006: Hit-parade, Plon, ISBN 978-2259203081
- 2015: Tableau de chasse, Éditions Héloïse d'Ormesson, 2015 ISBN 978-2-35087-296-4; reprint Le Livre de Poche, 2016, ISBN 9782253098508 – Prix Henri de Régnier
