= L'Anneau du pêcheur =

1995 novel by Jean Raspail

- First edition
- Author: Jean Raspail
- Language: French
- Genre: Alternate history
- Publisher: Éditions Albin Michel
- Publication date: 1995
- Publication place: France
- Pages: 403
- ISBN: 9782226076908

L'Anneau du pêcheur ("The Ring of the Fisherman") is a 1995 novel by the French writer Jean Raspail. The narrative has two timelines: the time of Benedict XIII, the last antipope of the Avignon Papacy, and contemporary times, when the Catholic Church tries to discover Benedict's successor, as it turns out that his line of papacy has continued in secret throughout the centuries. The book received the Prix Maison de la Presse and the Prince Pierre Foundation's Literary Prize.
