= Marguerite Gurgand =

French writer (1916–1981)

Marguerite Gurgand, née Marguerite Lévêque (Note: according to her grave at Tillou Cemetery) (born 1916, Tillou, Deux-Sèvres – 30 October 1981, Tillou), was a French writer, winner of the Prix du Livre Inter in 1981.

== Selection of works ==
- 1979: Nous n'irons plus au bois
- 1981: Les Demoiselles de Beaumoreau, prix du Livre Inter, prix Maison de la Presse, prix de l'Académie de Bretagne.
- 1982: L'Histoire de Charles Brunet (posthumous work completed by Jean-Noël Gurgand)
