= Marc Alyn =

French poet (1937–2025)

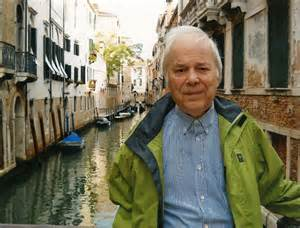
- Born: Alain-Marc Fécherolle; 18 March 1937; Reims, France
- Died: 7 December 2025 (aged 88)
- Occupation: Poet
- Writing career
- Notable awards: Prix Goncourt

Alain-Marc Fécherolle (18 March 1937 – 7 December 2025), better known as Marc Alyn, was a French poet.

== Life and career ==
Alain-Marc Fécherolle was born in Reims, France on 18 March 1937. He was mobilised to Algeria in 1957.

Alyn lived far from Paris, a farmhouse in Uzès, Gard. He traveled to the Middle East to the ruins of the Phoenician city of Byblos, and to Beirut, where he met the French Lebanese poet Nohad Salameh, whom he married.

He was a member of the Académie Mallarmé and Prix Guillaume Apollinaire jury.

Alyn later developed cancer of the larynx, which deprived him for many years of the use of his voice. He died on 7 December 2025, at the age of 88.

== Awards ==
- 1994: Grand Prix du roman de l'Académie française
- 2005: Prix Henri de Régnier
- 2007: Prix Goncourt

== Works ==
=== English translations ===
- French poetry today: a bilingual anthology, Simon Watson Taylor, Edward Lucie-Smith, editors, Rapp and Whiting; Deutsch, 1971
- The Big supposer: Lawrence Durrell a dialogue with Marc Alyn Translator Francine Barker, Grove Press, 1973

=== Poetry ===
- "LA BIBLIOTHEQUE DANS LE MIROIR", Le Printemps des Poetes
- Liberté de voir Terre de Feu (1956).
- Le Temps des autres, Seghers (1956) Prix Max Jacob 1957.
- Cruels divertissements, Seghers (1957).
- Jean-Louis Trintignant dit les poèmes de Marc Alyn, Véga-Seghers, (1958).
- Serge Reggiani dit, Marc Ogeret chante Marc Alyn, Studio S.M. (1958).
- Brûler le feu, Seghers (1959).
- Délébiles, Ides et Calendes (1962).
- Nuit majeure, Flammarion (1968).
- Infini au-delà, Flammarion (1972) Prix Apollinaire 1973.
- Douze poèmes de l'été, Formes et langages (1976).
- Rêves secrets des tarots, Formes et langages (1984).
- Poèmes pour notre amour, Formes et langages (1985).
- Le Livre des amants, Des Créateurs (1988).
- Les Alphabets du Feu: Byblos, La Parole planète, Le Scribe errant, ID- Livre (1991–1993) Grand Prix de Poésie de l'Académie française 1994 et Grand Prix de Poésie de la SGDL 1994.
- Le Chemin de la parole, (1994).
- L'Etat naissant, (1996).
- Les Mots de passe, (1997).
- L'Oeil imaginaire, (1998).
- Le Miel de l'abîme, (2000).
- Les Miroirs byzantins, Alain Benoit (2001).
- Le Tireur isolé, Phi/Ecrits des Forges (2010).
- La Combustion de l'ange 1956-2011, preface by Bernard Noël, Le Castor astral, 2011.

=== Prose ===
- Marcel Béalu, Subervie (1956).
- François Mauriac, Seghers (1960).
- Célébration du tabac, Robert Morel, (1962).
- Les Poètes du XVIe siècle, J'ai Lu (1962).
- Dictionnaire des auteurs français, Seghers (1962).
- Dylan Thomas, Seghers (1962).
- Le Déplacement, Flammarion (1964).
- Gérard de Nerval, J'ai Lu (1965).
- Srecko Kosovel, Seghers (1965).
- André de Richaud, Seghers (1966).
- Odette Ducarre ou Les Murs de la Nuit, Robert Morel (1967).
- La Nouvelle Poésie française, Robert Morel (1968).
- Norge, Seghers (1972).
- Entretiens avec Lawrence Durrell, Pierre Belfond (1972) et Gutenberg (2007).
- Le Diderot de Borès, Galerie du Salin (1975).
- Kama Kamanda: poète universel: hommage, L'Harmattan, 1997, ISBN 978-2-7384-5700-4
- Le Manuscrit de Roquemaure, Le Chariot, (2002).
- Mémoires provisoires, L'Harmattan, (2002).
- Le Silentiaire, Dumerchez, (2004).
- Le Piéton de Venise, Bartillat, (2005).
- Les Miroirs voyants, Voix d'encre (2005).
- Le Dieu de sable, Phi/ Ecrit des Forges, (2006).
- Paris point du jour, Bartillat, (2006).
- Approches de l'art moderne, Bartillat (2007).
- Monsieur le chat, Ecriture (2009) Prix Littéraire 30 Millions d'Amis, 2009
- Anthologie poétique amoureuse, Ecriture (2010).
