= The Book of Abraham (novel) =

1983 novel by Marek Halter

- Author: Marek Halter
- Genre: Historical fiction
- Publisher: Éditions Robert Laffont
- Publication date: 1983
- English publication date: 1 April 1986
- Awards: Prix Maison de la Presse; Prix du Livre Inter

The Book of Abraham is a historical novel written by French writer Marek Halter that documents the history (both factual and fictional) of his Jewish family. Although the early parts of the book are fictional, those parts taking place after the fifteenth century factually document the history of Marek Halter's family.

== Plot summary ==
The book begins in AD 70 in Jerusalem during the siege of the city by the Romans just prior to the destruction of the Second Temple. Abraham, a Jewish scribe, his wife and two sons live in Jerusalem and have survived the siege. On the day when the Romans breach the city walls and set fire to the Second Temple, Abraham and his family successfully escape Jerusalem only to be stopped by a Roman platoon. The Roman soldiers incapacitate Abraham and rape and murder his wife. Abraham and his sons are later freed, but he is forced to surrender his scrolls to a Roman commander.

At this point, Abraham begins a scroll that documents his family's journeys (the so-called "Book of Abraham", around which the story revolves) and lists his sons and their descendants. Each successive generation after Abraham dies adds on to the Book of Abraham, which continues to the point when the original scroll is lost and to the end of the book when Marek Halter's grandfather dies during the Warsaw Ghetto Uprising.

From Jerusalem, the family moves, over the course of nearly 2000 years, to cities such as Carthage, Hippo, Rome, Toledo, Cordoba, Narbonne, Troyes, Strasbourg, Constantinople, Amsterdam, Lublin, Odessa, and Warsaw.

In both the fictional and factual parts of the book, the story coincides with many notable historical events, including the fall of the Western Roman Empire, the Islamic conquests, the Inquisition, the Black Plague, the French Revolution, and World War II, as well as telling the story from the point of view of the Jews during the early to late Middle Ages, Renaissance, Industrial Revolution, and the early Twentieth century (i.e., showing the segregation and hardships faced by the Jews after their expulsion from Palestine).

== Awards ==
La Mémoire d'Abraham won the Prix Maison de la Presse and the Prix du Livre Inter.

== In popular culture ==
The book inspired the identically titled song written by Jean-Jacques Goldman and performed by Celine Dion, "La mémoire d'Abraham", in its original French version. No- it was about the Plains of Abraham in Quebec City and the fight between the French and English.
