= Emmanuelle Bayamack-Tam =

French writer

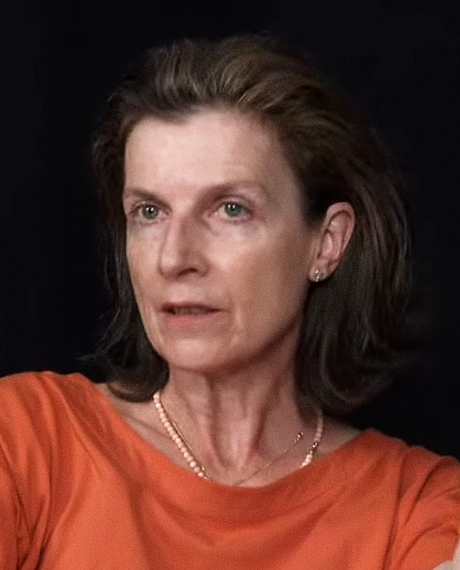
- Emmanuelle Bayamack-Tam in 2022
- Born: Emmanuelle Garino; 16 March 1966 (age 60); Marseille, France
- Occupation: Writer
- Writing career
- Pen name: Rebecca Lighieri
- Language: French
- Years active: 1994–present
- Notable works: Arcadie (2018); La Treizième Heure (2022)
- Notable awards: Prix Médicis (2022)

Emmanuelle Bayamack-Tam (née Garino; born 16 March 1966) is a French writer. She also writes under the pseudonym Rebecca Lighieri. In 2022, she was awarded the Prix Médicis for her novel La Treizième Heure.

== Biography ==
Born in 1966 in Marseille as Emmanuelle Garino, she lives in Villejuif, near Paris. She writes under the surname of her first husband, with whom she has two daughters.

Since 2013, she has also published noir novels under the pseudonym Rebecca Lighieri.

In 2018, she published the novel Arcadia (French: Arcadie), which received the 2019 Prix du Livre Inter. It was shortlisted for the Prix Femina, Prix Médicis and Prix de Flore. It was also longlisted for the Prix France-Culture and Prix Wepler.

In 2021, she co-wrote the screenplay of Émilie Aussel's first feature film L'Été l'éternité (Our Eternal Summer), which had its world premiere at the 74th Locarno Film Festival.

In 2022, she was awarded the Prix Médicis for her novel La Treizième Heure.

== Bibliography ==
=== Novels ===
- 6P. 4A. 2A., short stories, Martigues, France, Éditions Contre-pied, 1994, 26 p.
- Rai-de-cœur, Paris, Éditions P.O.L, 1996, 106 p. ISBN 2-86744-505-1
- Tout ce qui brille, Éditions P.O.L, 1997, 118 p. ISBN 2-86744-575-2
- Pauvres morts, Éditions P.O.L, 2000, 185 p. ISBN 2-86744-746-1
- Hymen, Éditions P.O.L, 2002, 285 p. ISBN 2-86744-927-8
- Le Triomphe, Éditions P.O.L, 2005, 158 p. ISBN 2-84682-116-X
- Une fille du feu, Éditions P.O.L, 2008, 184 p. ISBN 978-2-84682-272-5
- La Princesse de, Éditions P.O.L, 2010, 267 p. ISBN 978-2-8180-0005-2
- Si tout n'a pas péri avec mon innocence, Éditions P.O.L, 2013, 448 p. ISBN 978-2-8180-1746-3
- Je viens, Éditions P.O.L, 2015, 464 p. ISBN 978-2-8180-3541-2
- — (2018). Arcadie. Paris: Éditions P.O.L. 448 p. ISBN 978-2-8180-4600-5. LCCN 2018424860. OCLC 1050742749.
  - — (2021). Arcadia. Translated by Diver, Ruth. New York: Seven Stories Press. 416 p. ISBN 978-1-64421-053-6. LCCN 2020055645. OCLC 1184681032.
- — (2022). La Treizième Heure. Paris: Éditions P.O.L. 512 p. ISBN 978-2-8180-5586-1. LCCN 2022426464. OCLC 1343208578.

=== as Rebecca Lighieri ===
- Husbands, novel, Éditions P.O.L, 2013, 448 p. ISBN 978-2-8180-1661-9
- Les Garçons de l'été, novel, Éditions P.O.L, 2017, 448 p. ISBN 978-2-8180-4178-9
- Eden, novel, Medium+, 202 p. ISBN 978-2-2113-0478-8
- Que dire ! (collaborative bande dessinée with Jean-Marc Pontier), Les Enfants Rouges, 2019 ISBN 978-2-35419-103-0
- Il est des Hommes qui se perdront toujours, novel, Éditions P.O.L, 2020, 373 p. ISBN 978-2-8180-4868-9
- Wendigo, novel, Medium/L'école des loisirs, 2023, 231 p. ISBN 9782211332354
- Le Club des enfants perdus, novel, Éditions P.O.L, 2024, 515 p. (ISBN 978-2818061435)

=== Plays ===
- Mon père m'a donné un mari, Éditions P.O.L, 2013, 176 p. ISBN 978-2-8180-1749-4
- À l'abordage !, 2020

== Awards ==
- 2013 – Prix Ouest-France Étonnants Voyageurs for Si tout n'a pas péri avec mon innocence
- 2013 – Prix Alexandre-Vialatte for Si tout n'a pas péri avec mon innocence
- 2019 – Prix du Livre Inter for Arcadie
- 2022 – Prix littéraire des lycéens des Pays de la Loire for Il est des Hommes qui se perdront toujours
- 2022 – Prix Médicis for La Treizième Heure
