= Créhange =

- Commune
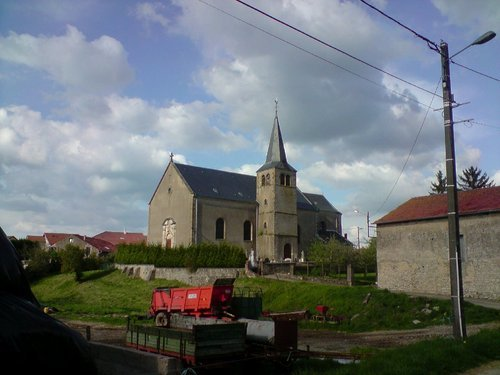
- The church in Créhange

- Coat of arms
- Location of Créhange
- Location within France Location within Grand Est
- Coordinates: 49°03′49″N 6°34′58″E
- Country: France
- Region: Grand Est
- Department: Moselle
- Arrondissement: Forbach-Boulay-Moselle
- Canton: Faulquemont
- Intercommunality: CC District urbain de Faulquemont

Government
  - Mayor (2020–2026): François Lavergne
- Area^{1}: 10.46 km^{2} (4.04 sq mi)
- Elevation: 325 m (1,066 ft)
- Highest elevation: 388 m (1,273 ft)
- Lowest elevation: 232 m (761 ft)
- Population (2023): 3,691
  - Density: 352.9/km^{2} (913.9/sq mi)
- Time zone: UTC+01:00 (CET)
  - Summer (DST): UTC+02:00 (CEST)
- INSEE/Postal code: 57159 /57690
- ^{1} French Land Register data, which excludes lakes, ponds, glaciers > 1 km^{2} (0.386 sq mi or 247 acres) and river estuaries.

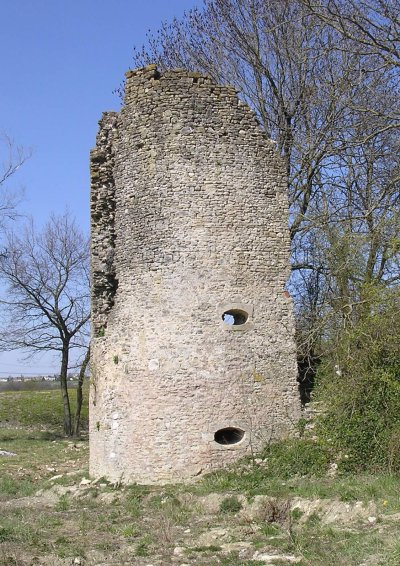
Ruin of the castle of Créhange

Créhange (French pronunciation: [kʁe.ɑ̃ʒ]; Lorraine Franconian: Krischingen, German: Kriechingen) is a commune in the Moselle department in Grand Est in north-eastern France. The writer Joël Egloff (born 1970) was born in Créhange.

Until 1793, Créhange was the capital of the County of Kriechingen, a state of the Holy Roman Empire.

== Population ==
Historical population
Year	Pop.	±% p.a.
1968	3,569	—
1975	3,355	−0.88%
1982	4,017	+2.61%
1990	3,854	−0.52%
1999	3,891	+0.11%
2007	3,974	+0.26%
2012	4,010	+0.18%
2017	3,868	−0.72%
2023	3,691	−0.78%
Source: INSEE

== See also ==
- Communes of the Moselle department
