= Jacques Perry =

French novelist

Jacques Perry (born 1921 Paris – 23 April 2016) was a French novelist.

He won the 1952 Prix Renaudot for L'Amour de rien, the 1966 Prix des Libraires for Vie d'un païen, and the 1976 Prix du Livre Inter for Le Ravenala ou l'Arbre du voyageur.

He holds a degree and is a graduate of HEC Paris.

== Works ==
- Le Testament, 1948
- L'Amour de rien, R. Julliard, 1952, Prix Renaudot 1952
- Le Mouton noir: roman, R. Julliard, 1953; Julliard, 1968
  - The Black Sheep, V. Gollancz, 1955
- Monsieur d'Ustelles: roman, R. Julliard, 1954
- Dieu prétexte, Julliard, 1955
- L'Amour de toi, Julliard, 1956
- Maurice Vlaminck, R. Kister, 1957
- Vie d'un païen, R. Laffont, 1965; R. Laffont, 1984, Prix des libraires 1966
  - Vida de un pagano, Domingo Pruna, Plaza & Janés, 1968
- Vie d'un païen 2 : La Beauté à genoux
- Vie d'un païen 3 : La Peau dure R. Laffont, 1967
- La Grande Idée R. Julliard, 1959
- With Manuel Rossell Pesant, La belleza de rodillas, Plaza y Janés, 1968
- La Liberté en croupe, roman, R. Laffont, 1969
- Rue du dragon Éditions et publications premières, 1971
- Le Trouble-source, A. Michel, 1975, ISBN 978-2-226-00157-3
- Le Ravenala ou l'Arbre du voyageur, A. Michel, 1976, ISBN 978-2-226-00297-6, Prix du Livre Inter 1976
- Les Fruits de la passion, A. Michel, 1977, ISBN 978-2-226-00471-0
- L'Île d'un autre: roman, A. Michel, 1979
- L'Abbé don Juan, Ramsay, 1980, ISBN 978-2-85956-171-0
- Yo Picasso, J.C. Lattès, 1982
- Folie suisse A. Michel, 1983, ISBN 978-2-226-01778-9
- Le Cœur de l'escargot, A. Michel, 1985, ISBN 978-2-226-02121-2, prix des Bouquinistes 1995
- Oubli, A. Michel, 1987, ISBN 978-2-226-02873-0
- Alcool vert, Balland, 1989
- Les Sables roses d'Essaouira Calmann-Lévy, 1990, ISBN 978-2-7021-1883-2
- Les Taches du léopard Belfond, 1992, ISBN 978-2-7144-2958-2
- Marin: roman, A. Michel, 1998, ISBN 978-2-226-10057-3
- Les Indiscrets, Rocher, 2001, ISBN 978-2-268-04074-5
- Le Gouverneur des ruines, Rocher, 2003, ISBN 978-2-268-04451-4
- Jeu de nain, Rocher, 2004, ISBN 978-2-268-04962-5
- Oda, Éditions du Rocher, 2005, ISBN 978-2-268-05323-3
- Fringales, Rocher, 2006, ISBN 978-2-268-05905-1
