= Jean-Jacques Brochier =

French journalist

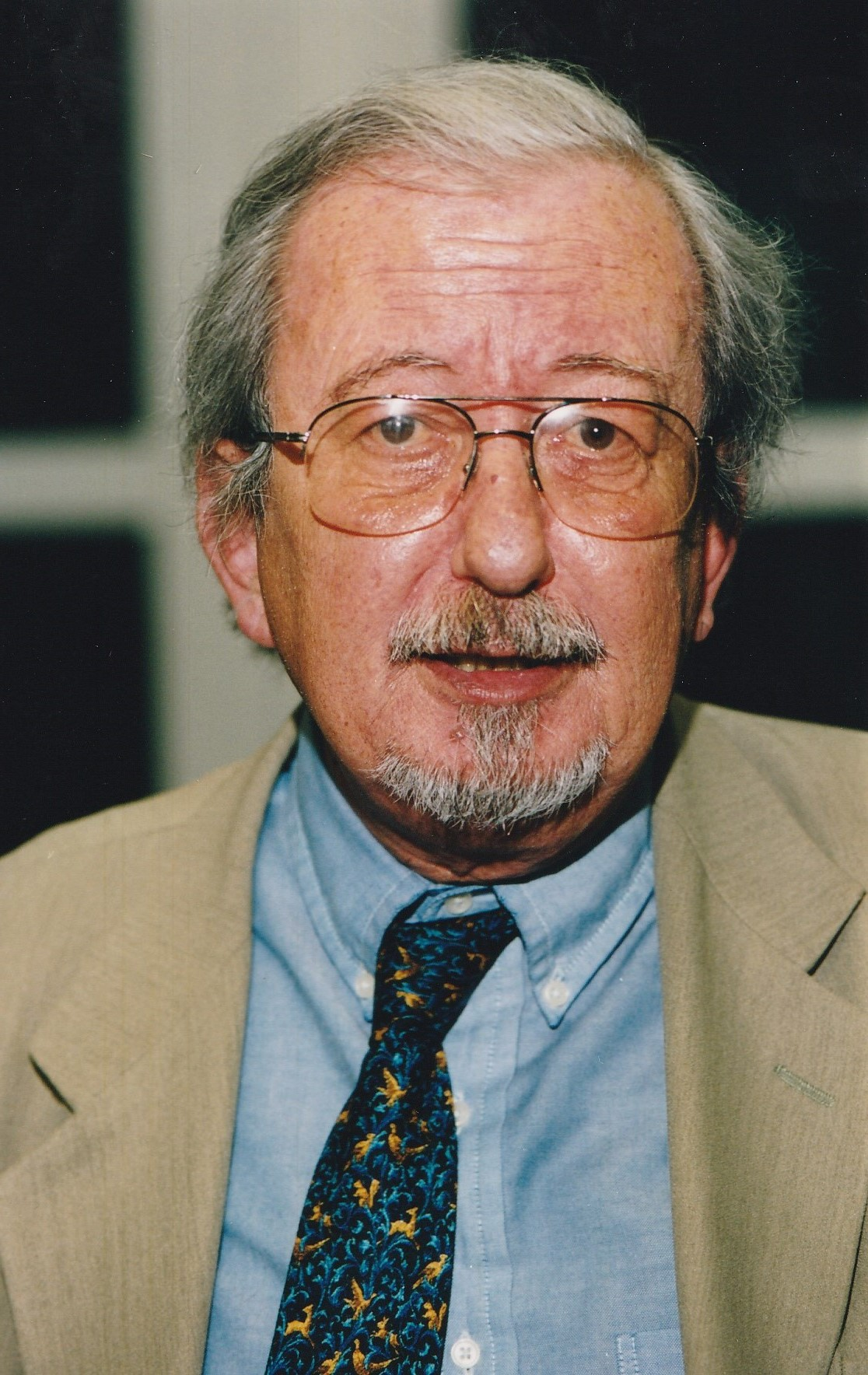
- Born: 28 December 1937; Lyon
- Died: 29 October 2004 (aged 66); Paris
- Occupations: Journalist; Novelist

Jean-Jacques Brochier (28 December 1937 – 29 October 2004), the son of a physician, was a French journalist, and chief editor of Le Magazine Littéraire from 1968 to 2004.

== Biography ==
As a student, he was actively engaged with the NLF and became a member of the Réseau Jeanson. On 24 November 1960, while he was vice-president of the General Assembly of the students of Lyon, he was arrested along with his wife in support of the struggle for the independence of Algeria. On 14 April 1961 they were both sentenced to ten years imprisonment and jailed in prisons Saint-Paul then Montluc. He was struck with indignité nationale. He would finally be sentenced to three years in prison before receiving a presidential pardon.

Close to Gilles Deleuze and Dominique de Roux who guides him to le Magazine littéraire, in 1967, an admirer of Martin Heidegger and Jean-Paul Sartre, he had in his possession a desk of Émile Zola and became a television columnist in Italiques, a program proposed by Marc Gilbert (in French).

He published several novels, including Un jeune homme bien élevé (1978) (Prix des Sept 1979), Un cauchemar (1984) Prix du Livre Inter (1985), and L'Hallali (1987). He is also the author of essays - notably on Camus, Sade, Vailland, Robbe-Grillet, Maupassant and Sartre - and the pamphlet entitled Camus, philosophe pour classes terminales.

From 1995, he was a member of the jury of the prix de l'écrit intime. He was an honorary member of the Maison internationale des poètes et des écrivains of Saint-Malo

In 1997, Jean-Jacques Brochier established with Danièle Brison and Chantal Robillard the prize "Printemps du Roman", awarded each year at Saint-Louis (Haut-Rhin), at the book fair of which he was president until his death in 2004. The presidency has since been awarded to a different jury member each year.

== Private life ==
He married Nicole Brochier, born April 8, 1937.

== Distinctions ==
- 1985: Prix du Livre Inter for Un cauchemar
- 2000: Liste des prix littéraires de la Communauté française de Belgique

== Bibliography ==
- 1969: Roger Vailland, tentative de description, Paris, Éric Losfeld, 148 p.
- 1982: Villa Marguerite, Paris, Albin Michel
- 1984: Une enfance lyonnaise au temps du Maréchal, ACE éditeur
- 1984: Un cauchemar, Albin Michel, Prix du Livre Inter 1985
- 1987: L'hallali, Albin Michel
- 1994: Anthologie de la bécassine et des petits échassiers, Paris, Hatier, 221 p.
- 1995: Pour Sartre : le jour où Sartre refusa le Nobel, Paris, JC Lattès
- 1996: Chroniques du Capricorne 1977–1983, Encrages éditions
- 2002: Un jeune homme bien élevé, Paris, La Différence, coll. Minos
- 2005: Pour l'amour des livres - interviews with Nadine Sautel, Albin Michel
- 1980: Odette Genonceau, Albin Michel
