= Joël Egloff =

French writer and screenwriter

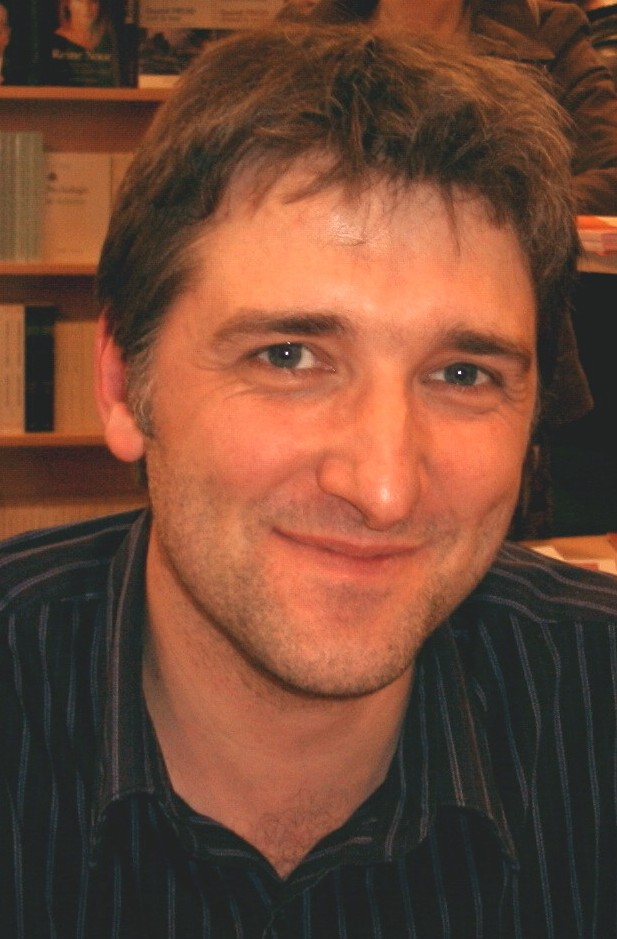
Joël Egloff at Salon Livre de Paris, March 2006

Joël Egloff (born 1970, Créhange in Moselle) is a contemporary French writer and screenwriter.

== Biography ==
After his baccalaureate, Joel Egloff studied history in Strasbourg and then enrolled in a school of cinema, the ESEC (École supérieure libre d’études cinématographiques) in Paris. He wrote scenarios and worked as assistant director. He is now devoted to writing. He is the author of five novels, including L'Étourdissement which got the Prix du Livre Inter 2005.

L’Homme que l’on prenait pour un autre (Buchet/Chastel, 2008) combines strange poetry and black humor. It is the story of an individual with such an ordinary face and a face so common that he is "daily taken for someone else".

== Work ==
=== Novels ===
- Edmond Ganglion & fils
1. Monaco, Paris: Éditions du Rocher, 1999, 162 p. (Littérature). ISBN 2-268-03329-5
2. Extrait in 12 extraits de romans de la rentrée, supplément de Lire n° 277 "spécial livres de poche", 07/1999, p. 37-43.
3. Paris: Éd. France loisirs, 2000, 162 p. ISBN 2-7441-3428-7
4. Paris: Éditions Gallimard, 2001, 162 p. (Folio n° 3485). ISBN 2-07-041357-8
5. Monaco; Paris : Éd. du Rocher, 2009, 162 p. (Littérature). ISBN 978-2-268-06893-0
- Ce que je fais là assis par terre
1. Monaco; Paris : Éd. du Rocher, 2003, 154 p. (Littérature). ISBN 2-268-04765-2
- L'Étourdissement
1. Paris : Buchet/Chastel, 2004, 142 p. ISBN 2-283-02020-4
2. Paris : le Grand livre du mois, 2005, 142 p. ISBN 2-286-01662-3
3. Paris : Éd. France loisirs, 2006, 187 p. (Courts romans & autres nouvelles). ISBN 2-7441-8882-4
4. Paris : Gallimard, 2006, 140 p. (Folio n° 4418). ISBN 2-07-031157-0
- L’Homme que l’on prenait pour un autre
1. Paris: Buchet/Chastel, 2008, 202 p. ISBN 978-2-283-02169-9
2. Paris: Pocket, 2009, 153 p. (Pocket Best n° 13722). ISBN 978-2-266-18431-1
- J’enquête
1. Buchet-Chastel, 2016, 288 p. ISBN 978-2-283-02631-1

=== Short stories ===
Collection of short stories

- Les Ensoleillés
1. Monaco, Paris : Éd. du Rocher, 2000, 157 p. (Littérature). ISBN 2-268-03749-5
2. Paris, Gallimard, 2002, 157 p. (Folio n° 3651). ISBN 2-07-041972-X
- Libellules - Prix de l'Humour noir de la Nouvelle 2012
1. Paris : Buchet/Chastel, 2012, 192 p. ISBN 978-2-283-02333-4
2. Paris : Gallimard, 2014, 147 p. (Folio n° 5706). ISBN 978-2-07-045338-2

Short stories

- "Ta maison, l’assurance te la remboursera". Le Figaro littéraire, 20 July 2007.
- "La Grande Réparation". In Bienvenue en Transylvanie : neuf histoires de vampires, anthologie. Points n° 2971, 2013. ISBN 978-2-7578-3287-5

=== Preface ===
- La Source by Hubert Mingarelli. Sainte-Anastasie : Cadex, 2012, 52 p. (Texte au carré). ISBN 978-2-913388-82-6

== Prizes and awards ==
- 1999: Prix Alain-Fournier for Edmond Ganglion & fils (Éd. du Rocher)
- 2000: Prix Erckmann-Chatrian for Les Ensoleillés (Éd. du Rocher)
- 2004: Prix de l'Humour noir for Ce que je fais là assis par terre (Éd. du Rocher)
- 2005: Prix du Livre Inter and Prix du Roman des Libraires Édouard-Leclerc for L'Étourdissement (Buchet/Chastel)
- 2012: Grand prix Société des gens de lettres de la Nouvelle for Libellules (Buchet/Chastel)

== Adaptations of his works ==
=== Theatre ===
- 2007: L'Étourdissement. Theatrical adaptation and staging by Luc Clémentin with Denis Barré, Christine Zavan, Benjamin Zeitoun. Creation at Théâtre Confluences (20th arrondissement of Paris, 24 October to 25 November 2007).

=== Short films ===
- 2007: Les Ensoleillés. Direction Didier Massot. Jeu: sophie Bezard. Cadre: Loetitia Candellier. Duration: 8 min 42 s. Short film shot during a stage of leadership of actors. It is the result of a work done by the director with the actress Sophie Bezard on a monologue of the collection Les Ensoleillés.
- 2014 : L’Étourdissement. Direction: Gérard Pautonnier. Production: Elzevir Films & Bactery Films. Duration: 23 min. With Arthur Dupont, Philippe Duquesne, Pascale Arbillot, Nicolas Vaude, Féodor Atkine, Miglen Mirtchev, Éric Bougnon, Marie Berto.

=== Bibliography ===
Chronicles

- Ferniot, Christine. "Étourdis et confus". Télérama, 12 January 2008, n° 3026.
- Fillon, Alexandre. "Un autre monde". Livres-Hebdo, 23 November 2007, n° 711, p. 39.

Interviews

- Labat, Julien. "L’art de l’absurde". Page des libraires, January–February 2008, n° 118, p. 24.

=== External links ===
- Joël Egloff on Babelio
- Joël Egloff: Entre Burlesque et Ironie on bscnews.fr
- Joël Egloff - J'enquête on YouTube
- J'’enquête de Joël Egloff on Tête de lecture
- "La chronique de Jacques Plaine" : J'enquête, de Joël Egloff on L'Essor (22 September 2016)
