= Indignité nationale =

Legally defined offence in France

Indignité nationale (French for 'national unworthiness') was a legally defined offence in France created for the trials of collaborators that followed the liberation of France during World War II. The offence of indignité nationale was meant to fill a legal void: while the laws in application in 1939 had provisions against treason, murder and such crimes, they did not take into account reprehensible behaviours which occurred during the occupation and in the Vichy regime, such as participation in the Waffen-SS or in the Milice. The bill of the "Ordinance Instituting National Indignity" was presented by the Provisional Government of the French Republic government on 26 June 1944 and adopted by the National Assembly on 26 August 1944. In addition to typical punishments, such as imprisonment and death, a temporary or permanent deprivation of civil rights was also imposed on those convicted of indignité nationale, under the name dégradation nationale (transl. national demotion). Indignité nationale ceased to be a criminal offence in January 1951, and the punishment of dégradation nationale was lifted in August 1953.

== History ==
=== 1942–1953 ===
Gaullist legal preparations to post-war purges started in Lyon in 1942. Chief prosecutor for Paris Maurice Rolland joined the Lyon Commission in 1943. Charles de Gaulle was inclined to leave the post-war purges to ad hoc decisions of the judges, relying solely on the 1939 statute that punished treason with death. Meetings of the Consultative Assembly, which convened beginning on 11 January 1944, persuaded de Gaulle that "containing vengeance" would be more difficult than he thought. Indeed, in the few months that followed the Normandy landings, at least 4,500 alleged collaborators were killed in summary judicial executions.

De Gaulle and his government needed a legal instrument which, unlike the 1939 law on treason, would not involve harsh sentences and could thus be applied to a wide circle of offenders. They also wanted to avoid enacting an ex post facto law, and created the concept of continuing "state of indignity" as a workaround solution. The new law instituted a new concept of a criminal state of a person, the state of indignity. A person entered the state of indignity through committing certain acts (not necessarily crimes) in the past, and this state continued until redemption through punishment. The offence is defined as "having after 16 June 1940 knowingly aided, directly or indirectly, Germany or its allies in France or abroad, or having attacked the unity of the Nation, or the liberty of the French people, or the equality between them", including the following acts named by law:

- participation in the Vichy Cabinet;
- holding executive posts in the Vichy propaganda apparatus or the Commissariat-General for Jewish Affairs;
- active participation in pro-collaboration demonstrations;
- membership in pro-collaboration organizations.

By the beginning of 1951, when indignité nationale ceased to be a criminal offence, more than 46,000 people had been convicted: 3,158 by the Courts of Justice (counting only the cases where indignité nationale was the main offence) and 46,145 cases tried by the Civic Chambers. Only 3,184 people so charged were acquitted. In 1953, all surviving convictees, except those convicted by the High Court, were amnestied of indignité nationale charges.

=== Algerian War of Independence ===
Charges of indignité nationale were invoked again during the Algerian War. Several "suitcase carriers" of the Jeanson network, such as the journalist Jean-Jacques Brochier, were sentenced long after 1951, not for having aided the Axis, but for having "attacked the unity of the Nation, or the liberty of the French people, or the equality between them."

=== January 2015 attacks ===
After the January 2015 Île-de-France attacks, French President François Hollande considered the possibility of reviving indignité nationale as a penalty for French citizens who contribute to a terrorist attack. After deputy Philippe Meunier of the UMP previously brought the idea before the National Assembly in November 2014, it was taken up again by Nathalie Kosciusko-Morizet and Anne Hidalgo. Marine Le Pen declared herself against the idea, calling it a "gadget measure".

Socialist deputy Jean-Jacques Urvoas, author of a 2015 parliamentary report on the issue, declared himself for a dégradation républicaine ('Republican demotion') instead of indignité nationale'.

== Dégradation nationale ==
Those found guilty of indignité nationale were subject to a special penalty known as dégradation nationale ('national demotion') and, from 30 September 1944, confiscation of property. Dégradation entailed:

- Loss of the right to vote
- Exclusion from elected office and public or semi-public positions
- Dishonorable discharge from the military and loss of all decorations
- Exclusion from management positions in businesses, banks, the press, and broadcasting
- Exclusion from all positions in trade unions, professional organisations, the judiciary, education, journalism, and the Institut de France
- Loss of the right to keep and bear arms

The duration of disqualification, from five years to life, was decided by the court on a case-by-case basis. The courts could suspend but not lift the penalty for those who served in the Free French Forces or participated in the Resistance. The courts were not allowed to choose a specific form of disqualification and had to invoke the whole set of bans or acquit the person. The only elective punishments were the confiscation of property and a ban on living in certain areas. The offenders sometimes lost their pension rights, although that was not intended by the legislators and was uncommon in practice.

== See also ==
- Lustration – Scrutinizing the communist past of public officials
- Insurrection Clause – Provided for disenfranchisement of ex-Confederates
