= Prix Maison de la Presse =

Annual French literary prize

The Prix Maison de la Presse is an annual French literary prize, established in 1970 by the Syndicat national des dépositaires de presse (SNDP) and Gabriel Cantin. Until 2005 it was known as Prix des Maisons de la Presse and given out in the two categories Novel (Roman) and Non-Fiction (Document), after which the name was changed and the categories merged into one.

== Recipients ==
=== Novel, 1970–2020 ===
- 1970: Jean Laborde, L'Héritage de violence, Flammarion
- 1971: Luc Estang, La Fille à l'oursin, Seuil
- 1972: Pierre Moustiers, L'Hiver d'un gentilhomme, Gallimard
- 1973: René Barjavel, Le Grand Secret, Presses de la Cité
- 1974: Michel Bataille, Les Jours meilleurs, Éditions Julliard
- 1975: Charles Exbrayat, Jules Matrat, Albin Michel
- 1976: Guy Lagorce, Ne pleure pas, Grasset
- 1977: Maurice Denuzière, Louisiane, JC Lattès
- 1978: André Lacaze, Le Tunnel, Grasset
- 1979: Jeanne Bourin, La Chambre des dames, la Table Ronde
- 1980: Nicole Ciravégna, Les Trois Jours du cavalier, Seuil
- 1981: Marguerite Gurgand, Les Demoiselles de Beaumoreau, Éditions Mazarine
- 1982: Irène Frain, Le Nabab, JC Lattès
- 1983: Régine Deforges, La Bicyclette bleue, Editions Ramsay
- 1984: Michel Déon, Je vous écris d'Italie, Gallimard
- 1985: Patrick Meney, Niet !, Éditions Mazarine
- 1986: André Le Gal, Le Shangaïé, JC Lattès
- 1987: Loup Durand, Daddy, Presses Pocket
- 1988: Amin Maalouf, Samarkand (Samarcande), JC Lattès
- 1989: Christine Arnothy, Vent africain, Grasset
- 1990: Patrick Cauvin, Rue des Bons-Enfants, Albin Michel
- 1991: Catherine Hermary-Vieille, Un amour fou, Ed. Olivier Orban
- 1992: Christian Jacq, L'Affaire Toutankhamon, Grasset
- 1993: Josette Alia, Quand le soleil était chaud, Grasset
- 1994: Michel Ragon, Le Roman de Rabelais, Albin Michel
- 1995: Jean Raspail, L'Anneau du pêcheur, Albin Michel
- 1996: Jean-Claude Libourel, Anthonin Maillefer, Robert Laffont
- 1997: Christian Signol, La Lumière des collines, Albin Michel
- 1998: Bernard Clavel, Le Soleil des morts
- 1999: Daniel Pennac, Aux fruits de la passion
- 2000: Georges Coulonges, L'Été du grand bonheur
- 2001: Frédéric H. Fajardie, Les Foulards rouges, JC Lattès
- 2002: Paul Couturiau, Le Paravent de soie rouge, Presses de la Cité
- 2003: Lorraine Fouchet, L'Agence, (Robert Laffont)
- 2004: Frédéric Lenoir and Violette Cabesos, La Promesse de l'ange Albin Michel
- 2005: Pierre Assouline, Lutetia, Gallimard
- 2006: Katherine Pancol, Les Yeux jaunes des crocodiles, Albin Michel
- 2007: Patrick Graham, L'Évangile selon Satan, Anne Carrière
- 2008: Jean Teulé, Le Montespan, Éditions Julliard
- 2009: Patrick Bauwen, Monster, Albin Michel
- 2010: Adélaïde de Clermont-Tonnerre, Fourrure, Stock
- 2011: Véronique Olmi, Cet été-là, Grasset
- 2012: Michel Bussi, Un avion sans elle, Presses de la Cité
- 2013: Agnès Ledig, Juste avant le bonheur, Albin Michel
- 2014: François d'Épenoux, Le Réveil du cœur, Éditions Anne Carrière
- 2015: Laurence Peyrin, La Drôle de Vie de Zelda Zonk, Éditions Kero
- 2016: Marc Trévidic, Ahlam, JC Lattès
- 2017: Philippe Besson, Arrête avec tes mensonges, Éditions Julliard
- 2018: Valérie Perrin, Changer l'eau des fleurs, Albin Michel
- 2019: Olivier Norek, Surface, Michel Lafon
- 2020: Caroline Laurent, Rivage de la colère, Les Escales

=== Non-Fiction, 1970–2005 ===
- 1970: Jean Pouget, Le manifeste du camp n°1, Fayard
- 1971: Brigitte Friang, Regarde-toi qui meurs, Robert Laffont
- 1972: R. Auboyneau and J. Verdier, La gamelle dans le dos, Fayard
- 1973: Georges Bortoli, Mort de Staline, Robert Laffont
- 1974: Marie Chaix, Les lauriers du lac de Constance, Seuil
- 1975: Jacques Charon, Moi, un comédien, Albin Michel
- 1976: J. F. Rolland, Le Grand Capitaine, Grasset
- 1977: Patrick Segal, L'homme qui marchait dans sa tête, Flammarion
- 1978: Marcel Scipion, Le clos du roi, Editions Seghers
- 1979: Florence Trystram, Le procès des étoiles, Editions Seghers
- 1980: Philippe Lamour, Le cadran solaire, Robert Laffont
- 1981: Jacques Chancel, Tant qu'il y aura des îles, Hachette Littérature
- 1982: Gisèle de Monfreid, Mes secrets de la Mer Rouge, Editions France-Empire
- 1984: Jean-François Chaigneau, Dix chiens pour un rêve, Albin Michel
- 1985: Eric Lipmann, L'idole des années folles, Editions Balland
- 1990: J. Massabki and F. Porel, La mémoire des cèdres, Robert Laffont
- 1991: Noëlle Loriot, Irène Joliot-Curie, Presses de la Renaissance
- 1992: Gilbert Bordes, Porteur de destins, Editions Seghers
- 1993: Jean-Paul Kauffmann, L'arche des Kerguelen, Flammarion
- 1994: Catherine Decours, La dernière favorite, Editions Perrin
- 1995: Jean-François Deniau, Mémoires de 7 vies, Editions Plon
- 1996: Jean Lartéguy, Mourir pour Jérusalem, Editions de Fallois
- 1997: Frédéric Mitterrand, Les aigles foudroyés, Robert Laffont
- 1998: Maurice Herzog, L'autre Annapurna, Robert Laffont
- 1999: Malika Oufkir and Michèle Fitoussi, La Prisonnière, Grasset
- 2000: Georges Suffert, Tu es Pierre, Editions de Fallois
- 2001: Dominique Lapierre, Il était minuit cinq à Bhopal, Robert Laffont
- 2002: Simone Bertière, Marie-Antoinette l'insoumise, Editions de Fallois
- 2003: Tavae Raioaoa, Si loin du monde, OH ! Editions, 2003
- 2004: Françoise Rudetzki : Triple peine, Editions Calmann-Levy
- 2005: Didier Long, Défense à Dieu d'entrer, Éditions Denoël
