= Jean-Claude Andro =

French writer

Jean-Claude Andro (1937, Quimper – 2000) was a French writer. He published his first novel at 22 and then left to teach in Mexico (1960–62). He then pursued a career as a novelist and translator (Zone sacrée and Chant des aveugles by Carlos Fuentes and Christ des ténèbres by Rosario Castellanos).

In 1998 he was awarded the prix Henri de Régnier bestowed by the Académie française for all his work. In addition to this prize, he was also awarded the Prix Amic (1993 and 1996) and the Prix Mottard (1995) by this same Académie.

== Bibliography ==
- 1959: Les Vacances interdites, Plon
- 1968: La Mer des Sargasses, Éditions Denoël, Prix Bretagne
- 1969: La Neige autour, Denoël
- 1971: le vent dans les arbres, Flammarion
- 1972: L’Esprit du lieu, Flammarion
- 1977: La Maison profonde, Flammarion: Grand Prix de l’Académie de Bretagne
- 1983: Des Masques dans un bal, Flammarion
- 1992: La Région des grands lacs, Flammarion
- 1992: L’Esprit du lieu, Flammarion
- 1992: Toutes les salles de la forêt, Flammarion
- 1992: Les Fontaines écarlates, Flammarion
