= Prix Henri de Régnier =

Prize to support French literary creation

The Prix Henri de Régnier is an annual prize to support literary creation awarded by the Académie française. It was established in 1994 by grouping together the Foundations Aubry-Vitet, Bonardi, Pierre de Régnier, Xavier Marnier, Monbinne, Pierre Villey and de Vismes. As of 2025, the value of the prize is 5,000 euros. The 2025 winner was Zineb Medkouar.

== List of laureates ==
| Year | Author | Work/Publisher | Award |
|---|---|---|---|
| 1995 | Frédéric Maire | All his work | 5 000 Fr |
| 1997 | Robert Marteau | All his work | 5 000 Fr |
| 1998 | Jean-Claude Andro | All his work | 10 000 Fr |
| 1999 | Maurice Pons | All his work | 20 000 Fr |
| 2000 | Jean-Christophe Buisson | Héros trahi par les Alliés, Le général Mihailovic, Éditions Perrin | 20 000 Fr |
| 2001 | Jean-Clarence Lambert | Anthologie de la poésie suédoise, and all his poetic work, Somogy | 20 000 Fr |
| 2002 | Bruno Maillé | All his work | €3 000 |
| 2003 | Fouad El-Etre | All his work | €3 000 |
| 2005 | Marc Alyn | Le Piéton de Venise, Éditions Bartillat | €5 000 |
| 2006 | Catherine Pinguet | All his work | €5 000 |
| 2007 | Pascal Rannou | De Corbière à Tristan. Les Amours jaunes : une quête de l'identité, Honoré Champion | €5 000 |
| 2008 | Célia Houdart | Les merveilles du monde, Éditions P.O.L | €5 000 |
| 2009 | Jean-Jacques Lafaye | « Pour soutenir son étude sur André Maurois » | €5 000 |
| 2010 | Annelise Roux | La Solitude de la fleur blanche, Sabine Wespieser Editeur | €5 000 |
| 2011 | Guillaume Métayer | Anatole France et le nationalisme littéraire. Scepticisme et tradition, Éditions du Félin | €5 000 |
| 2012 | Philippe Lançon | Les Îles, Editions JC Lattès | €5 000 |
| 2013 | Jean-Baptiste Harang | Bordeaux-Vintimille, Éditions Grasset | €5 000 |
| 2014 | Kirby Jambon. | Petites Communions. Poèmes, chansons et jonglements | €5 000 |
| 2015 | Arnaud Guillon | Tableau de chasse, Editions Héloïse d'Ormesson | €3 000 |
| 2016 | Marc Pautrel | Une jeunesse de Blaise Pascal, Editions Gallimard | €3 000 |
