= Michel Bataille =

French screenwriter (1926–2008)

- Born: March 25, 1926; Paris, France
- Died: February 28, 2008 (aged 81); Clamart, France
- Occupations: Writer; architect

Michel Bataille (March 25, 1926 – February 28, 2008) was a French writer.

== Biography ==
Bataille studied architecture at École nationale supérieure des beaux-arts, and took part in projects with Le Corbusier. Thirteen years later, he left architecture due to deafness problems, and devoted himself to writing. Living in Paris, and then in Saint Cloud, he ultimately chose Normandy to settle with his family, consisting of his wife, painter Marie Claude, and his children Frédéric, Eric, Emmanuelle, and Nicolas.

In 1947 he won the Stendhal Prize for his first novel, Patrick, and in 1950, after the publication of La marche du soleil (written during a trip to Africa), he temporarily stopped writing.

His job as an architect inspired him to write Une pyramide sur la mer in 1965, and La ville des fous in 1966. He was a guest of Bernard Pivot and Jacques Chancel on several occasions. His novel L'arbre de Noël (1967) qualified in the first two rounds of the Prix Goncourt, but was eliminated in the third round of voting. The book was later turned into a film by Terence Young in 1969, with Bourvil in the main role.

His novel Une colère blanche (1969) is the story of a painter in all his creativity and suffering (winning the Prix des Quatre Jurys). The novelCendres sur la mer (1975) went against the grain of the times by presenting abortion as a tragedy.

He also published books on Jean Jaurès and Gilles de Rais.

He was the nephew of Georges Bataille.

== Works ==
- Patrick (winner of the Prix Stendhal in 1947)
- La marche du soleil ('The Sun's Walk') (1950)
- Le chat sauvage ('The Wild Cat') (1960)
- Cinq jours d'automne ('Five Days of Autumn') (1963), later adapted for television
- Le feu du ciel ('Fire from Heaven') (1964)
- Une pyramide sur la mer ('A Pyramid on the Sea) (winner of the Prix des Deux Magots in 1965)
- La ville des fous (City of Fools) (1966)
- L'arbre de Noël (1967) (Published in English as The Christmas Tree in 1969)
- Une colère blanche ('White Wrath') (1969)
- Le cri dans le mur ('The Scream in the Wall') (winner of the Jean-Cocteau Prize in 1970)
- Les jours meilleurs ('The Better Days') (1973, winner of the Maison de la Presse Prize in 1974)
- Sans toit ni loi ('No shelter, no law') (1974)
- Cendres sur la mer ('Ashes on the Sea') (1975)
- Soleil secret ('Secret Sun') (1975)
- Demain Jaurès ('Tomorrow Jaurès') (1977)
