= Jean-Jacques Lafaye =

French writer and journalist

- Born: 27 March 1958 (age 68); Saint-Germain-en-Laye, France
- Occupations: Writer and journalist
- Awards: Prix Cazes

Jean-Jacques Lafaye (born 27 March 1958) is a French writer and journalist. He was born in Saint-Germain-en-Laye, France. In 1990, Lafaye won the French literature award, Prix Cazes.

== Bibliography ==
=== Journalism ===
Jean-Jacques Lafaye's father was a renowned mesoamericanist. After studying in Strasbourg, Madrid and Paris, he began his career as a journalist by creating the magazine Latitude - mensuel d'actualité mondiale with the advertiser Yves Michalon. He then specialized in major international talks, both in the field of culture and diplomacy, notably for the magazine Politique internationale (which he has been collaborating with since 1983) la Revue des deux Mondes, Vogue-Paris, Connaissance des arts and other musical and literary publications. As a Hispanophone, he has written many texts in the Spanish daily newspaper ABC, la Revista de Occidente and Cuadernos Hispano-Americanos. Among his great partners are cardinal Carlo Maria Martini, Mario Vargas Llosa, prince Karim Aga Khan, Albert II, Prince of Monaco, actor Dirk Bogarde, dancer Maya Plisetskaya, painter Balthus, Mario Soares, Alexandre Zinoviev, Zbigniew Brzezinski, general Zia ul-Haq, Manuel Barroso, Yehudi Menuhin, and Javier Pérez de Cuéllar.

=== Music ===
His meeting with the Portuguese singer of fado Amalia Rodrigues opened a new chapter to him in the service of many artists. As international manager of Amalia Rodrigues from 1985 to 1992, he organized her 80 concerts in fifteen countries. He also collaborated with Susana Rinaldi, Milva, Teresa Berganza and other classical musicians such as Aldo Ciccolini, Jean Guillou and Yehudi Menuhin.

Portugal distinguished him by the title of Commander of the Order of D. Henrique (Henry the Navigator) in 2006. He was the originator of numerous public and official homages to the great figures of contemporary artists.

=== Literature ===
But it was in the literary field that his achievements were most striking: the first French biographer of Stefan Zweig, his book L'avenir de la nostalgie, published the year that saw the end of the Berlin Wall, earned him the 1990 Prix Cazes and other awards. His work as an essayist and his art of dialogue have given rise to some twenty books in the literary (David Shahar, musical (Amalia Rodrigues, Aldo Ciccolini), theater (Edwige Feuillère), art (Eduardo Arroyo) and history (Saint-Just) fields. His work has earned him the repeated support of the Pierre Bergé-Yves Saint-Laurent Foundation and in 2009 the Prix Henri de Régnier bstowed by the Académie Française. At the same time, his pictorial work served humanitarian causes in various European countries.

Involved during his life in the dialogue of cultures in the widest sense, including political and religious, he created in 1988 an association of international reflection: "Ethics and politics", gathering valuable moral testimonies for his book Conversations for a Better World in 2006. His humanistic commitment today leads him to defend the prospects of nuclear disarmament and the necessities of nuclear energy.
