= André Lacaze (journalist) =

French journalist

André Lacaze (1918–1986) was a French journalist. He was born in Paris. He achieved commercial success with the 1978 publication of his book Le Tunnel, an account of deportation to the Mauthausen concentration camp in Germany and to the Loïbl Pass camp during the Second World War. The book was published by Julliard, was optioned for a film, and won the Maison de la Presse Prize.

After the war, he became head of news at Paris-Match and editor-in-chief at RTL.
