= Virollet =

- Commune
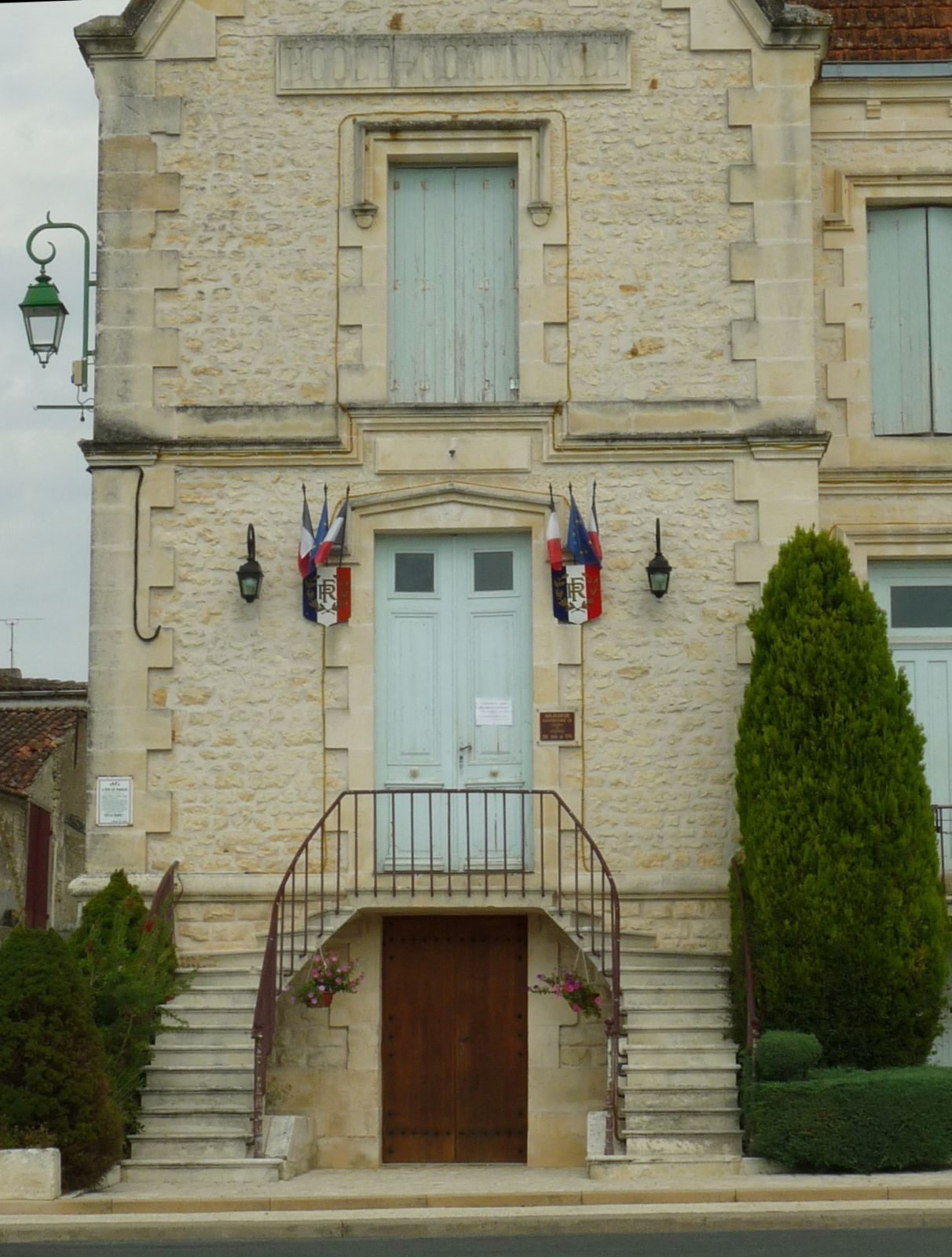
- Town hall
- Location of Virollet
- Location within France Location within Nouvelle-Aquitaine
- Coordinates: 45°33′04″N 0°43′02″W
- Country: France
- Region: Nouvelle-Aquitaine
- Department: Charente-Maritime
- Arrondissement: Saintes
- Canton: Saintonge Estuaire
- Intercommunality: Gémozac et Saintonge Viticole

Government
  - Mayor (2020–2026): Jean Geay
- Area^{1}: 10.01 km^{2} (3.86 sq mi)
- Highest elevation: 46 m (151 ft)
- Lowest elevation: 17 m (56 ft)
- Population (2023): 294
  - Density: 29.4/km^{2} (76.1/sq mi)
- Time zone: UTC+01:00 (CET)
  - Summer (DST): UTC+02:00 (CEST)
- INSEE/Postal code: 17479 /17260
- ^{1} French Land Register data, which excludes lakes, ponds, glaciers > 1 km^{2} (0.386 sq mi or 247 acres) and river estuaries.

Virollet (French pronunciation: [viʁɔlɛ]) is a commune in the Charente-Maritime department in southwestern France.

== Population ==
Historical population
Year	Pop.	±% p.a.
1968	277	—
1975	258	−1.01%
1982	238	−1.15%
1990	243	+0.26%
1999	238	−0.23%
2007	259	+1.06%
2012	256	−0.23%
2017	275	+1.44%
2023	294	+1.12%
Source: INSEE

== See also ==
- Communes of the Charente-Maritime department
