= Lorraine Fouchet =

French writer

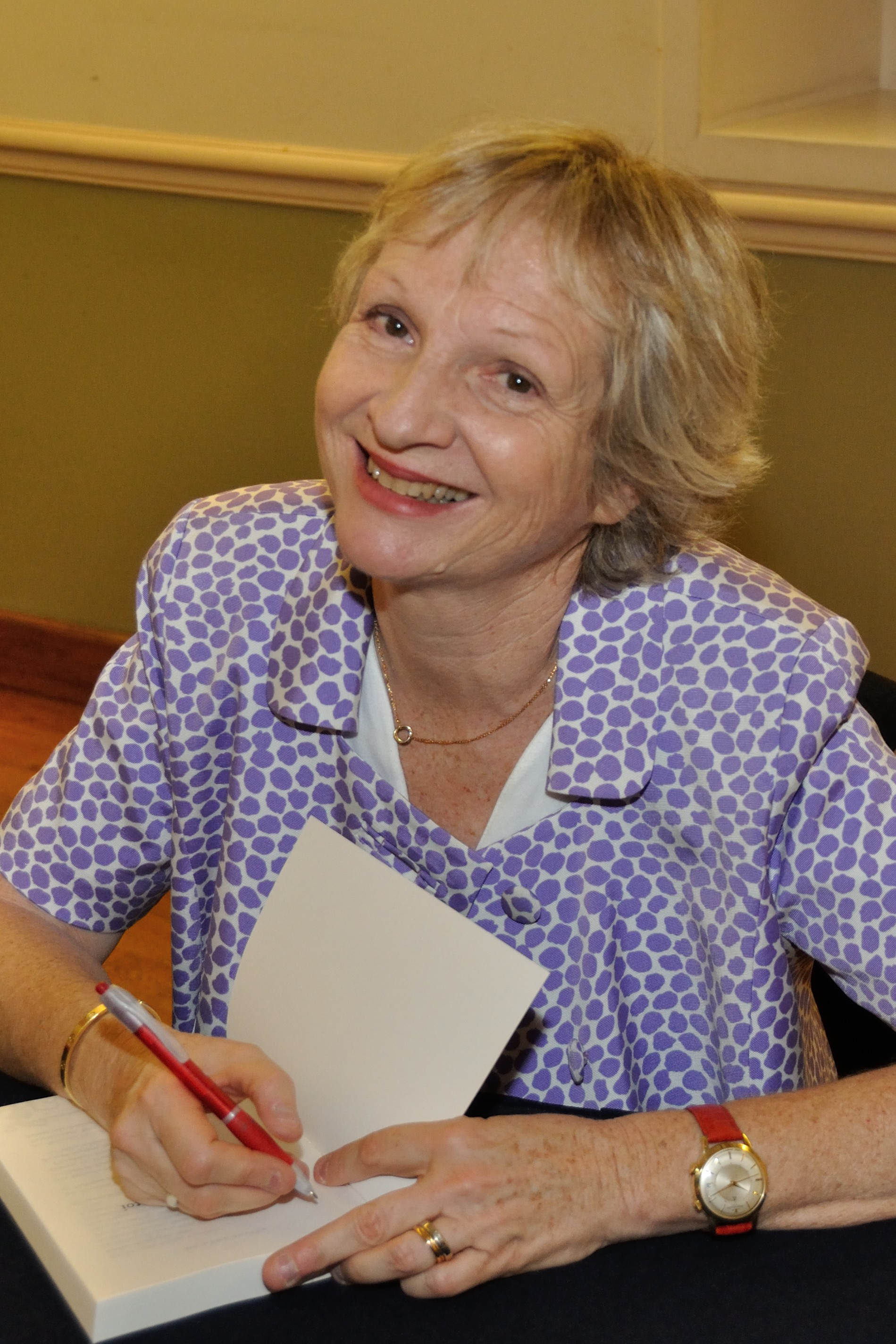
Portrait of Lorraine Fouchet

Lorraine Fouchet is a French writer. Before devoting herself to writing, she was an emergency physician. She is the author of nineteen novels, including the bestseller Entre ciel et Lou, which won the Prix Ouest and the Prix Breizh. In 2014, she published J’ai rendez-vous avec toi, an open letter to her father Christian Fouchet. She lives between Yvelines and the island of Groix.
