= André Le Gal =

French writer (1946–2013)

Andre Le Gal (1946–2013) was a French writer. He wrote around a dozen novels, among which are Le Shangaïé, winner of the Prix Maison de la Presse, and Ensemble de ses travaux, winner of the Prix Amic, awarded by the Academie Francaise.

He was also awarded Citoyen d'honneur by the town of Saint-Malo.
