= Georges Bortoli =

French journalist

- Born: June 28, 1923; Casablanca, French Morocco
- Died: July 13, 2010 (aged 87); Meudon, France

Georges Bortoli (June 28, 1923 – July 13, 2010) was a French journalist and author.

At the end of the Second World War, Bortoli began his career in Tunis and for ten years dedicated himself to covering the problems of North Africa and the Third World. Towards the end of the 1950s, he turned to television and became, among other things, one of the presenters of the RTF television news in Paris. In the 1960s, Bortoli established himself as a specialist in the Soviet Union and was in particular a correspondent for the ORTF and then Antenna 2 station in Moscow for several years. He was subsequently an editorialist in international relations for several decades.

== Bibliography ==
- Living in Moscow (1969)
- Death of Stalin (1973)
- See Moscow and Leningrad (1974)
- See Yugoslavia (1978)
- Twelve Russians and an Empire: A Thousand Years of History (1980)
- The big leagues: behind the scenes of the summits (1991)
- Such a long benevolence: The French and the USSR 1944-1991 (1994)
