= Jacques Lafaye =

French historian (1930–2024)

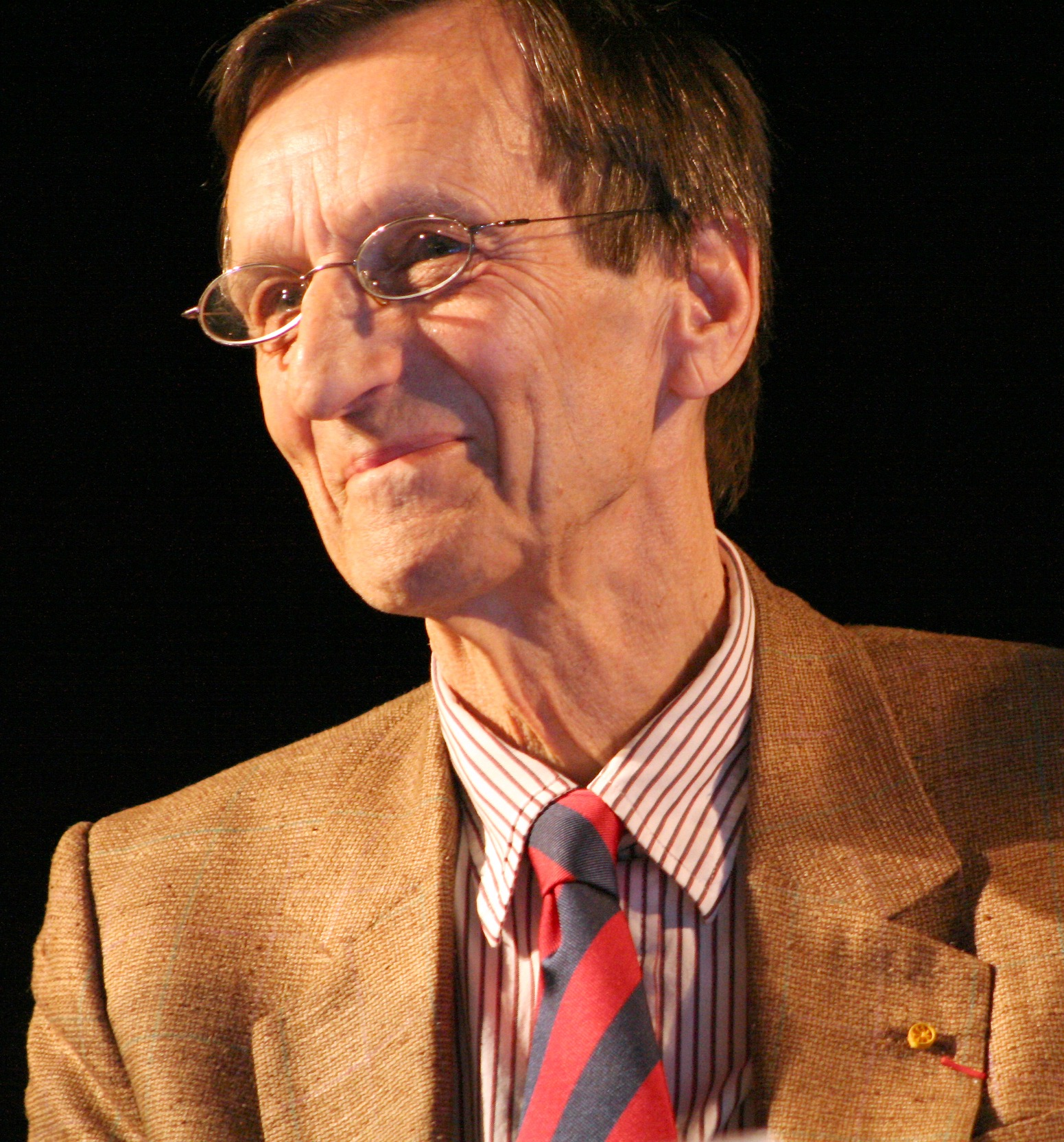
Lafaye in 2009

Jacques Lafaye (21 March 1930 – 8 July 2024) was a French historian who wrote on cultural and religious Spanish and Latin American history. His most popular work is Quetzalcoatl and Guadalupe written in 1974 regarding the formation of the Mexican National Consciousness and includes a prologue by Octavio Paz and is regarded as a keystone for the understanding of the contemporary Mexican culture and is regarded as one of the most comprehensive analyses of the colonial period in Mexico.

== Biography ==
Lafaye was born in Paris on 21 March 1930. He had a long trajectory in Spanish and Latin American history. His book Quetzalcoatl and Guadalupe. The Formation of Mexican National Consciousness became an important reference for Mexican colonial history. First printed in París by Gallimard Publishers (1974), then in the United States by the University of Chicago Press (1976) and in Mexico by Fondo de Cultura Económica (1977), has contributed to the understanding of the merging of the Spanish and Mexican Prehispanic cultures. Lafaye also wrote on the history of culture in general, including the Greek humanist tradition, the predecessors of the print.

Lafaye died on 8 July 2024, at the age of 94.

== Career ==
- Licence and Master of Spanish language and literature. (1951–53).
- Professor agrégé des Lycées. (1954)
- Midship of the French Navy, ORIC (1955–1957)
- Student (Élève titulaire) of École Pratique des Hautes Études (IV y VI Section) (1954-55 y 1957-60)
- Licence of ethnology, Institut d’ethnologie (Musée de l´homme, Paris, 1956–57)
- Maître-Assistant, Institut des Hautes Études de l’Amérique Latine des Universités de Paris. (1959–1968)
- Maître-Assistant, Sorbonne (Assistant of Prof. Robert Ricard, Director of the Institut hispanique) Paris (1960–1962)
- Research Attache, CNRS, (1962–1964)
- Maître de Conférences, University of Strasbourg, and Director Institut d´espagnol et de portugais (1964–1968)
- General Secretary of Société des Américanistes de Paris (Musée de l'Homme), and editor of Journal des Américanistes (1964-1977) and Acts of the XLII International Congress of Americanists- 12 Vols. (Centenary, Paris, 1976)
- Docteur de III cycle, University of Paris X-Nanterre (1967)
- Member of the Scientific Section of the Casa de Velázquez (Ecole franCaise des Hautes Etudes hispaniques) Madrid (1968–1971)
- Docteur d´État, University of Sorbonne-nouvelle (Paris III) (1971)
- Professor, University of Paris-Sorbonne (Paris IV) (1972–1990)
- Maître de Conférences associé, Collège Erasme (Université Catholique de Louvain), Belgium (1971–1985)
- Chargé de cours, École Normale supérieure (rue d’Ulm) (1971–72)
- Charge de cours, Centre National de Téléenseignement agrégation (1972–1974)
- Director of the Institut d’Études ibériques et latinoaméricaines, Sorbonne (1985 a 1988)
- Director of the Centre Universitaire d’études catalanes, Sorbonne (1979–1989)
- Professor and researcher at El Colegio de Jalisco, Guadalajara-Zapopan, México.
- Member of the Sistema Nacional de Investigadores, Mexico (SNI)(2000-2020)

== Visiting Professor ==
- Universidad Internacional Menéndez Pelayo (Santander) (1958)
- Universidad Nacional Autónoma de México (UNAM) (1960)
- Brown University (Providence, Rhode Island) (1964)
- Member of The Associates of the John Carter Brown Library
- University of California, Berkeley (1973)
- University of Alberta (Edmonton, Canada) (1974)
- The Woodrow Wilson International Center for Scholars (Smithsonian Institution), fellow, Washington DC, (1977 and 1989).
- The Institute for Advanced Study (Princeton). Guest Member.(1980–1981)
- Harvard University (Cambridge, Mass.), Visiting Professor (1991)
- Universidad Complutense de Madrid, Visiting Professor (1992)
- Universidad de Alcalá (Alcalá de Henares), Visiting Professor (1992–1993)
- Universitat de València (research, 1994)
- Guest speaker to the Cátedra Julio Cortázar, Universidad de Guadalajara, by Carlos Fuentes and Gabriel García Márquez (1995)
- Universidad de Guadalajara, México, Visiting Professor (1996)
- Universidad de Puerto Rico (Río Piedras), Visiting Professor (2000)

== Distinctions ==
- Prix Lugné Poë, Paris, 1949.
- Prix du duc de Loubat, Paris, 1974.
- Prix Becucci, Louvain, 1976.
- Prix de la Fondation Singer-Polignac, Paris, 1984.
- Associate Member of Real Academia de la Historia, Madrid, 1980.
- Associate Member of Real Academia Española, Madrid, 1981.
- Member of the Publisher Committee of the Boletín de la Real Academia Española, Madrid, 2010.
- Member of The Hispanic Society of America, New York, 1991.
- Commander of the Royal Order of Isabella the Catholic, Spain, 1985.
- Commander of the Order of Palmes académiques, France, 1994.
- Chevalier de la Légion d’honneur, France 1998.
- Insignia of Aguila Azteca Mexico, 2006.

== Bibliography ==
By Jacques Lafaye

- The Wonders of Spain, Londres: Thames and Hudson, (1962).(Paris: Arthaud, 1961;Milan:Mursia ed., 1962; Munich: Droemer Knaur, 1962)
- Les conquistadores, Paris : Éditions Seuil, Collection Le temps qui court, (1964).
- Konkwistadorzy, Warsaw: Omega, 1966.
- Los conquistadores, Translated by Elsa Cecilia Frost, México: Siglo XXI editores, 1970.
- Los conquistadores. Figuras y escrituras, México: Fondo de Cultura Económica, sección de historia, 1999.
- Manuscrit Tovar. Origines et croyances des indiens du Mexique, Bilingual edition in French and Spanish. Paleography, introduction and interpretation by J. L., Graz, Austria: Collection UNESCO d´Oeuvres représentatives - Akademische Druck- und Verlagsanstalt, (1972).
- Quetzalcóatl et Guadalupe, La formation de la conscience nationale au Mexique (1531–1813), Prologue by Octavio Paz, Éditions Gallimard, Paris (1974).
- Quetzalcoatl and Guadalupe. The Formation of Mexican National Consciousness, Translated by Benjamin Keen, University of Chicago Press (1976).
- Quetzalcóatl y Guadalupe. La formación de la conciencia nacional de México, 1531–1813, Translated by Ida Vitale and Fulgencio López Vidarte, México: Fondo de Cultura Económica, 1977.
- Mesías, cruzadas, utopías. El judeo-cristianismo en las sociedades ibéricas, Translated (partial) by Juan José Utrilla, México: Fondo de Cultura Económica, sección de Obras de historia, (1984).
- Sangrientas fiestas del Renacimiento. La era de Carlos V, Francisco I y Solimán el Magnífico, 1500–1557, México: Fondo de Cultura Económica, sección Breviarios, núm. 534, 1999.
- Brasil y Francia, una intimidad secular, trad. Laura López Morales, México: Facultad de Filosofía y Letras-UNAM, (2001).
- Albores de la imprenta. El libro en España y Portugal y sus posesiones de ultramar (siglos XV-XVI), México: Fondo de Cultura Económica, sección Obras de historia, (2002).
- Por amor al Griego. La nación europea, señorío humanista. (Siglos XIV-XVII), Fondo de Cultura Económica, Mexico, (2005).
- En el traspatio de la historia. Tomo I, Historia mexicana. Prólogo de Ernesto de la Torre Villar. Tomo II, Historia hispanoamericana. Tomo III, Historia española, Zapopan Jal. México: El Colegio de Jalisco, (2004, 2006, 2008).
- Simbiosis. Arte y sociedad en México. Preface by Teresa del Conde, CONACULTA, Mexico, 2009.
- De la historia bíblica a la historia crítica. El tránsito de la conciencia occidental, FCE, México, 2013.
- Octavio Paz. En la deriva de la modernidad. Siete ensayos. México, FCE, 2013.
- Un humanista del siglo XX. Marcel Bataillon, FCE, México, 2014. (prefacio de Claude Bataillon)
