= Locus Solus (journal) =

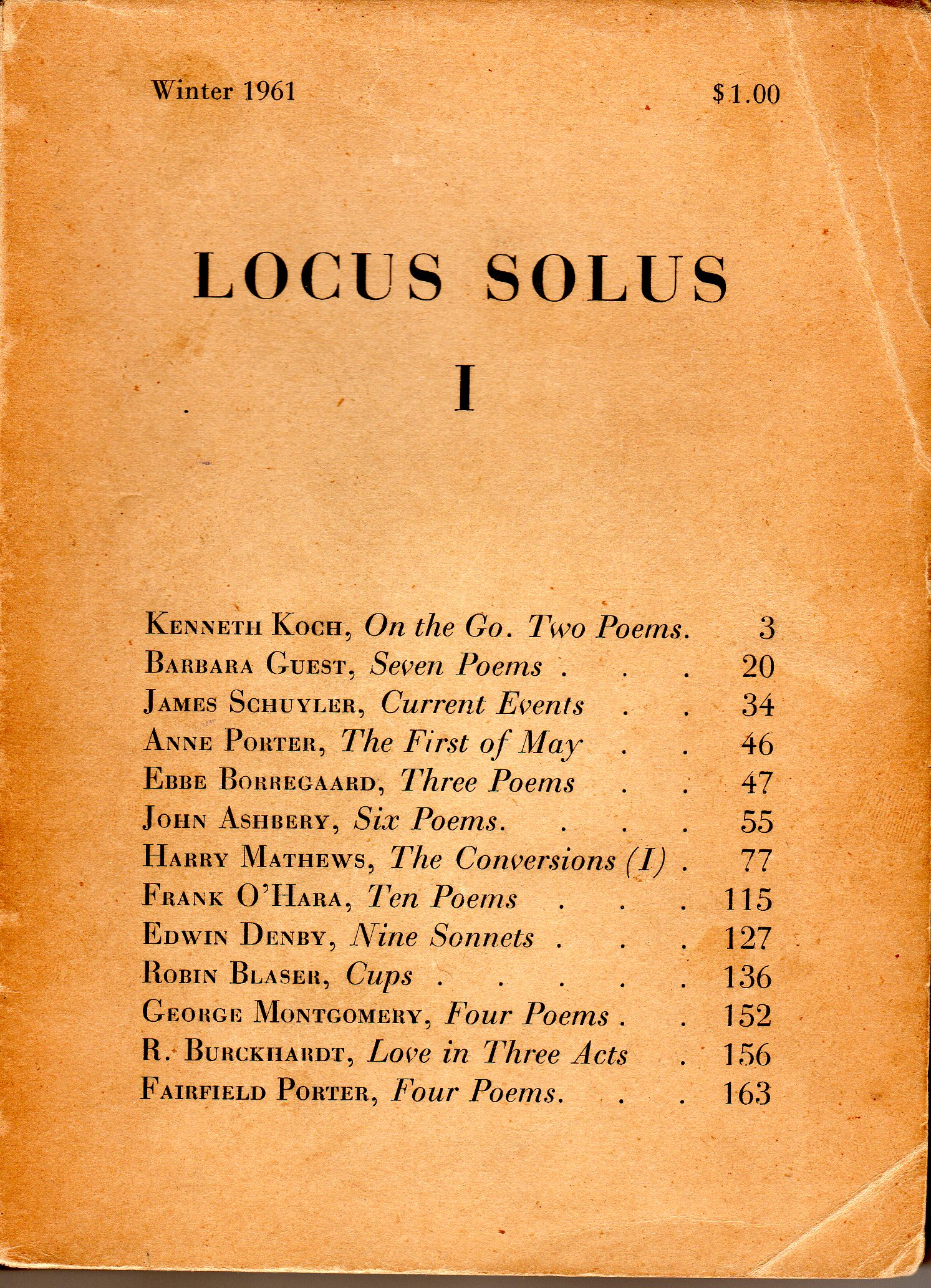
Locus Solus I

Locus Solus was an American journal of experimental poetry and prose that published four issues in 1961 and 1962, one (III-IV) a double issue. The magazine was edited by the writer Harry Mathews and the poets John Ashbery, Kenneth Koch, and James Schuyler, all of whom contributed to its four issues. The content was completely in English but the journal was published in France (in Lans-en-Vercors) by Mathews.

The journal was named after the novel Locus Solus by Raymond Roussel.
