= Locus Solus =

1914 novel by Raymond Roussel

- First edition
- Author: Raymond Roussel
- Language: French
- Genre: Novel
- Publication date: 1914
- Publication place: France
- Media type: Print
- ISBN: 978-1-84749-071-1
- OCLC: 226976066

Locus Solus is a 1914 French novel by Raymond Roussel.

== Plot summary ==
John Ashbery summarizes Locus Solus thus in his introduction to Michel Foucault's Death and the Labyrinth:

"A prominent scientist and inventor, Martial Canterel, has invited a group of colleagues to visit the park of his country estate, Locus Solus. As the group tours the estate, Canterel shows them inventions of ever-increasing complexity and strangeness. Again, exposition is invariably followed by explanation, the cold hysteria of the former giving way to the innumerable ramifications of the latter. After an aerial pile driver which is constructing a mosaic of teeth and a huge glass diamond filled with water in which float a dancing girl, a hairless cat named Khóng-dek-lèn, and the preserved head of Danton, we come to the central and longest passage: a description of eight curious tableaux vivants taking place inside an enormous glass cage. We learn that the actors are actually dead people whom Canterel has revived with 'resurrectine', a fluid of his invention which if injected into a fresh corpse causes it continually to act out the most important incident of its life."

It was translated into English by Rupert Copeland Cunningham, in addition to translations into Czech, Dutch, Italian, Polish, Turkish, Russian, Spanish, and other languages.

== References in other media ==
- Locus Solus was chosen, in reference to Roussel's novel, as the name of a short-lived literary journal (1961–62) edited and published by the American writers Harry Mathews, John Ashbery, James Schuyler, and Kenneth Koch. It is also briefly mentioned in Mathews's novel Cigarettes as well as The Sinking of Odradek Stadium.
- In autumn of 2014, the visual artist and novelist Mark Amerika published Locus Solus: An Inappropriate Translation Composed in a 21st Century Manner (Counterpath Press) to commemorate the 100-year anniversary of Roussel's original publication in France. Amerika's literary remix is conceived as a work of performance art, one where the artist uses an array of online translation programs to experiment with procedural methods reminiscent of Roussel's own writing style.
- The main antagonist of the animated film Ghost in the Shell 2: Innocence takes its name from this book. Also in the film, Section 9 members Batou and Togusa go to the North to question a mercenary hacker named Kim who lives in an elaborate mansion filled with odd mechanical and sensory art – as is also described in the book. Togusa looks through a peephole in a model of the mansion. On looking down at it, Togusa sees tableaux vivants of himself and Batou, and continually views different possible memories and futures that are the result of entering the mansion. The peephole is also taken from the novel's eight tableaux vivants.
- In the video game Wild Arms 5 for the PlayStation 2, Locus Solus is the name of the mothership used by the Veruni to escape from Filgaia (Earth). When crashed into Filgaia 12,000 years later, it was considered a sacred land for the Veruni.
- Musician John Zorn named a band and album after Locus Solus, creating improvised avant-garde jazz/rock.
- In his Brion Cemetery project at San Vito d'Altivole, architect Carlo Scarpa frequently refers to Locus Solus, Roussel being one of his favourite authors.
- Locus Solus is used as the name of a yearly music festival at Le Lieu Unique in Nantes, France dedicated to the building of experimental musical instruments.
- Electronic musician Richard Knott named one of his songs "Locus Solus", which became his breakout hit in 2012 when Eric Prydz's Pryda Friends record label signed it.
- DJ Harvey has recorded under the name Locussolus.
- Contemporary visual artist Pierre Huyghe has cited the novel as a defining influence in his work.

== English translation editions ==
- Locus Solus, trans. Rupert Copeland Cunningham (London: Calder and Boyar; Berkeley: University of California, 1970).
  - Reprinted by Calder in 1983 and 2003.
  - London: Alma Books, 2008. Revised edition. Reprinted in 2012 and 2017.
  - New Directions, 2017.
