= Robert Bober =

French journalist and writer (born 1931)

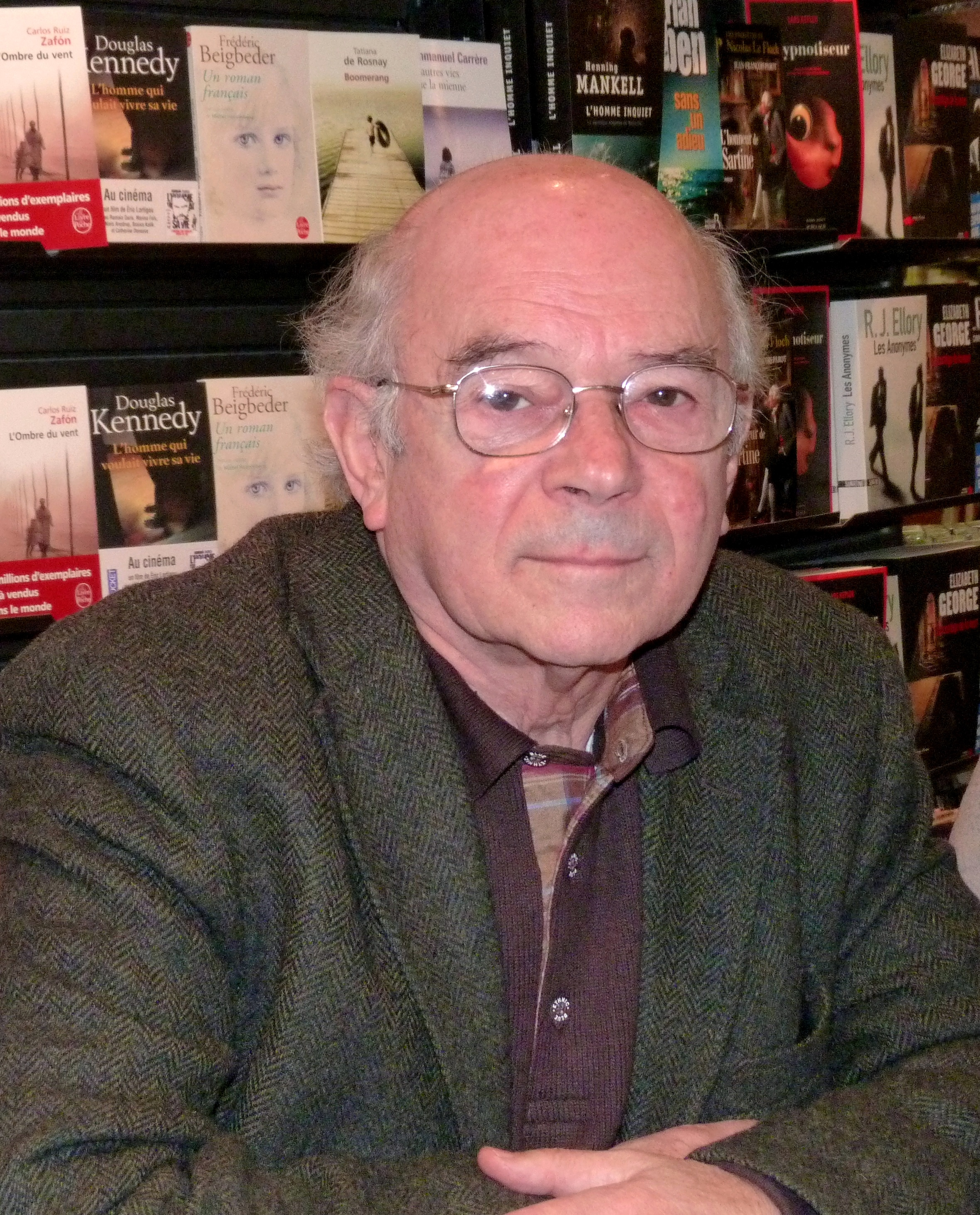
- Robert Bober in 2010
- Born: 17 November 1931 (age 94); Berlin, Weimar, Germany
- Occupations: Film and theatre director, writer
- Awards: Chevalier des Arts et des Lettres, Prix du Livre Inter

Robert Bober (born 17 November 1931) is a French film director, theater director and writer of German-Jewish origin. He was born on November 17, 1931, in Berlin. Since 1967, he has made dozens of documentary films for television. His first novel, Quoi de neuf sur la guerre? (Anything new in the war?), received the Prix du Livre Inter in 1994.

== Early life ==
Bober was born in Berlin in 1931 to Jewish parents of Polish origin. In 1933, fleeing Nazism, the family took refuge in France. Thanks to an early warning, the family managed to avoid the Velodrome d'Hiver roundup of July 1942, when many Jews were killed or deported. At 16, he began an apprenticeship as a tailor and made a living that way until the age of 22 when he turned to pottery. During his summer vacations he spent time with children who had lost their families during the Second World War.

== Career ==
In the 1950s Bober met François Truffaut and became his assistant on the films 400 Blows (1959), Shoot the Piano Player (1960), and Jules and Jim (1962). In 1967 he directed his first documentary for TV. During the 1960s and 1970s his documentaries primarily explored the consequences of the Holocaust.

In 1979 he collaborated with Georges Perec on a documentary film called Ellis Island Revisited, an adaptation of which, credited to Perec and Bober, was published in book form as Recits d'Ellis Island: histoires d'errance et d'espoir. It was published in English by The New Press as Ellis Island (1995), translated by Harry Mathews and Jane Blatt.

The French publisher P.O.L. has published four novels by Bober: Quoi de neuf sur la guerre (1993), Berg et Beck (1999), Laissées-pour-compte (2005) and On ne peut plus dormir tranquille quand on a une fois ouvert les yeux.(2010). On ne peut plus dormir tranquille quand on a une fois ouvert les yeux has been translated into English and published by The New Press under the title Wide Awake. As of 2025, it is Bober's only novel to have been translated into English.

== Sources ==
- Short biography
