= Ellis Island Revisited =

Récits d'Ellis Island: histoires d'errance et d'espoi
- English: Ellis Island Revisited: Tales of Vagrancy and Hope
- Directed by: Robert Bober
- Written by: Georges Perec
- Production company: INA
- Distributed by: TF1
- Release date: November 25, 1980
- Running time: 100 min
- Countries: France; United States
- Language: French

Ellis Island Revisited: Tales of Vagrancy and Hope (French Récits d'Ellis Island: histoires d'errance et d'espoir) is the first documentary film directed by Robert Bober, filmed in New York in 1979 and broadcast by the French television channel TF1 on November 25 and 26, 1980. The script was written by the French writer Georges Perec, who also provided the commentary of the first part of the film and conducted the interviews in the second part.

== Production ==
This project took its shape under Perec no later than 1979, as can be seen in his article, "E as Emigration: Ellis Island," included in his posthumous book I was born (Je suis né, 1990). In 1980 Perec published for INA-Magazine a text related to this film, with input from Robert Bober. The script was published under both their names the same year, by Editions du Sorbier.

The first part was translated by the writer Harry Mathews, a friend of Perec, and read by him as a voiceover in the English version, released as Ellis Island Revisited: Tales of Vagrancy and Hope, available from the INA and the Ministry of Foreign Affairs of France.
