= Marie Chaix =

French writer (born 1942)

- Born: Marie Beugras; 3 February 1942 (age 84); Lyon
- Occupation: Writer
- Spouses: Jean-François Chaix (1968; divorced); Harry Mathews (1992–2017; his death)
- Children: 2
- Writing career
- Language: French
- Genre: Memoirs
- Notable awards: Prix Maison de la Presse

Marie Chaix (née Beugras; 3 February 1942) is a French writer. She has written memoirs and a book about the singer Barbara. Her memoirs are about her mother and father as well as her life. Her book The Laurels of Lake Constance won the Prix Maison de la Presse in 1974.

== Early life and family ==
Chaix was born on 3 February 1942 in Lyon; her father was Albert Beugras who was a leader of the fascist French Popular Party. Her mother was named Alice and she had three siblings, including singer Anne Sylvestre. The family had a servant named Juliette that she considered to be her second mother.

Chaix only knew that her father had something to do with politics as a child, but she was unaware that he was the right-hand man of fascist leader Jacques Doriot. She thought of her childhood as being happy and normal despite her oldest brother going missing in action in Germany and her father being imprisoned from 1946 to 1954. Her father died in 1963 without his actions ever being discussed within his family. When she was 26 years old, Chaix became aware of her father's activities when she was given his notebooks to read by her mother, who asked Chaix to not tell anyone about its contents.

== Career ==
After Chaix's father died in 1963, she became a press attaché for the publishing company Éditions du Seuil. From 1964 to 1966, Chaix translated literature from German. She was the personal secretary of singer Barbara, who happened to be Jewish, and they toured through France, Europe, and Canada. In 1969 Chaix became an advertising executive and she began writing a memoir about her father, titled The Laurels of Lake Constance, during that time. The Laurels of Lake Constance is Chaix's first book and it was a bestseller, later winning the Prix Maison de la Presse in 1974.

Chaix's next book was a memoir about her mother titled Silences, or a Woman’s Life. One of Chaix's novels was rejected by Éditions du Seuil and the publisher did not allow her to rewrite it because they believed that she could only write autobiographies. In 1986, Alain Oulman became Chaix's editor for a book about the singer Barbara and Chaix thought of him as being "closer than a lover". Oulman died in 1990, a month after the book was published, which caused Chaix to not write for a decade. Her book The Summer of the Elder Tree was published by Dalkey Archive Press and translated by her later husband Harry Mathews. The Summer of the Elder Tree is about Chaix's decade-long break from writing and the places that she went to while writing The Laurels of Lake Constance, including an island that her father and brother were at during World War II.

== Personal life ==
She married journalist Jean-François Chaix in 1968 and they had a child named Émilie in 1969. Chaix's mother died in 1971 while in a coma. Their daughter named Leonore was born in 1974. Chaix lived in Key West for half of the year with her husband Harry Mathews and the rest of the year in either Lans-en-Vercors or Paris which is where her daughters lived, along with Émilie's son. Mathews died in 2017 at 86 years old.
