= Martin Winckler =

French writer

Martin Winckler (born Marc Zaffran; 22 February 1955, in French Algeria) is a French M.D. and short story, novel and essay writer. His main topics are the French medical system, the relationships between caregivers and patients and Women's Health. One of the first TV series critics in France, he has written numerous articles and books on the subject (ER; Grey's Anatomy; House, MD; Law & Order).

== Biography ==
His family emigrated from Algeria first to Israel in 1961 then to France in 1962. He was a dedicated young reader and writer. After graduating from Medical School in Tours, he practised in a small country town in Sarthe (western rural France) from 1983 to 1993. From 1983 to 1989, he worked as an editor then as assistant editor-in-chief for the independent medical journal La Revue Prescrire under his real name, Marc Zaffran.

In the mid-80's, his first short stories were published under the pseudonym "Martin Winckler". This name is a tribute to the French writer Georges Perec: Gaspard Winckler is one of the main characters in La Vie mode d'emploi (Life : A User's Manual), a very important book in Marc Zaffran's literary education. His first novel La Vacation (pub. 1989) introduces the central character of his major novels, Bruno Sachs M.D., who became famous in France with his second published novel La Maladie de Sachs; (in English The Case of Dr Sachs Translated by Linda Asher, Seven Stories Press, NY, 2000). It became a motion picture, written, produced and directed by Rosalinde and Michel Deville (1999). Albert Dupontel plays Bruno Sachs.

He opened a rural medical practice in 1983 which he left in 1993 to spend most of his time as a writer and translator. However, he remained a part-time doctor at the Le Mans public hospital, in the Abortion and Contraception clinic until 2008. His practice as a women's health physician lasted for 25 years. Many of his books were based on his experience as a medical practitioner.

Created in 2004, his web site "Winckler's Webzine" has published numerous texts about healthcare, contraception, TV serials. The "Contraception / Gynecology" section is the most frequently viewed.

In 2009 he immigrated to Montreal, Quebec where he first worked as a guest researcher at the Centre de Recherches en éthique de l'Université de Montréal (CREUM), on a research project about the training of medical personnel. He became a Canadian citizen in 2019.

Several of his books address the French medical culture and describe it as "archaic, violent and sexist and based on abuse of power".

Most of his novels and essays address patient rights, the right to accept or reject treatments, power struggles between physicians and patients, and women's health.

- The Case of Dr Sachs (P.O.L, 1998) is a very detailed description of a country physician's activities, as described by patients, relatives, colleagues and friends. The book sold 300,000 copies in its first edition alone.
- Les Trois Médecins (P.O.L, 2004) was inspired by Alexandre Dumas' "The Three Musketeers". It is set in a French Medical school in the 70s and tells how Bruno Sachs and three of his friends dedicated themselves to General Practice.
- Le Chœur des femmes (P.O.L, 2009) is a novel set in a Women's Health Clinic in central France. Another best seller, it sold 65,000 copies in its first edition and has been a paperback best seller since 2011 (240,000 copies and counting).
- En souvenir d'André (P.O.L, 2012) is a short novel whose protagonist provides Medical Assistance in Dying.
- Les Brutes en Blanc ("Brutes in white coats"), an essay published in 2016, made the French medical establishment very angry by its description of ongoing and institutionalized medical brutality in France. The "Ordre des médecins" (France's medical regulatory board) issued a statement to condemn the book as "a caricature of reality". Many other books addressing the very same topic have since been published, confirming Winckler's description and analysis through extended research.
- L'Ecole des soignantes (P.O.L, 2019) a Science-Fiction Novel, is the sequel to Le Choeur des femmes. Set in 2032, it describes a medical training school mostly run by female healthcare workers who have set aside all kind of hierarchy between professionals and provide care respectful of patients' preferences, choices and decisions.

== Works ==
Non Fiction

- Contraceptions mode d'emploi, 2001; Second ed. reviewed, Au Diable Vauvert, 2003. Third ed., J'ai Lu, 2007
- C’est grave docteur ? Ce que disent les patients, ce qu'entendent les médecins, La Martinière, 2002.
- Nous sommes tous des patients, interview with Catherine Nabokov, Le Livre de poche, 2005.
- Les Droits du Patient, with Salomé Viviana, Collection "Soigner", Fleurus 2007
- Choisir sa contraception, Collection "La Santé en questions", Fleurus 2007.
- Tout ce que vous vouliez savoir sur les règles... sans jamais avoir osé le demander, Collection "La Santé en questions", Fleurus 2008.
- Profession Médecin de famille, Presses de l'Université de Montréal, 2012
- Le patient et le médecin, Presses de l'Université de Montréal, 2014
- Les Brutes en blanc, Flammarion 2016.
- Tu comprendras ta douleur - Pourquoi nous avons mal et que faire pour que ça cesse, en collaboration avec Alain Gahagnon, Fayard 2019
- C'est mon corps - Tout ce que veulent savoir les femmes sur leur santé, L'Iconoclaste, 2020

Fiction

  - La Vacation, POL, 1989.
  - La Maladie de Sachs, POL, 1998; (in English : The Case of Dr Sachs Seven Stories Press, NY, 2000).
  - Les Trois Médecins, POL, 2004.
  - Le Poulpe, « Touche pas à mes deux seins », Baleine n°221 (2001) puis Librio n°559 (2002).
- Légendes, autobiographic text, P.O.L, 2002
- Plumes d'Ange, autobiographic text, P.O.L, 2003
  - Mort in vitro, Fleuve noir & Mutualité française, 2003.
  - Camisoles, Fleuve Noir, 2006.
  - Noirs scalpels (anthology collection Néo ) au Cherche Midi, 2006.
- J'ai Mal Là ..., Les Petits Matins, 2006
  - Le numéro 7 collection Néo au Cherche Midi, 2007; (inspired by the classic British TV show The Prisoner)
- Histoires en l'air, P.O.L, 2008
- Un pour Deux, "La Trilogie Twain, tome 1" Calmann-Lévy, 2008
- L'un ou l'autre, "La Trilogie Twain, tome 2", Calmann-Lévy, 2009
- Deux pour Tous, "La Trilogie Twain, tome 3", Calmann-Lévy, 2009
- Le Chœur des femmes, P.O.L, 2009 (A novel set in a Women's Health Clinic in central France. Another best seller - close to 300,000 copies sold.)
- En souvenir d'André, P.O.L, 2012
- Abraham et fils, P.O.L, 2016 (The first in a series about a physician and his son setting in rural France in 1963 after being forced to leave their native Algeria.)
- Les Histoires de Franz, P.O.L, 2017 (Second in the Abraham et fils series)
- L'Ecole des soignantes, P.O.L, 2019

Cultural criticism

- 1993: Mission impossible with Alain Carrazé (Néo - Huitième art)
- 1997: Les Nouvelles Séries américaines et britanniques 1996-1997 (coll. co-dirigé avec Alain Carrazé), Belles Lettres
- 1999: Les Séries télé (with Christophe Petit & Jean-Jacques Schléret), Larousse, collection « Guide Totem »; dictionnaires de séries.
- 2003-2005: Histoire des séries américaines:
  - tome 1, Les Miroirs de la vie, Le Passage
  - tome 2 (collective), Les Miroirs obscurs, Le Diable Vauvert
- 2004: Les séries TV et le soap opera, lecture at the Université de tous les savoirs; you can watch it at .
- 2005: Séries télé : De Zorro à Friends, 60 ans de téléfictions américaines, Éditions J'ai Lu, Collection Librio Repères
- 2005: Le Rire de Zorro, Ed. Bayard
- 2007: Le meilleur des séries, (ed.), Éditions Hors Collection
- 2008: L'année des Séries 2008, (ed.), Éditions Hors Collection
- 2012: Petit éloge des séries télé, Librio
- 2014: Docteur House, l'esprit du shaman, Ed. du Boréal

Others

- Les Cahiers Marcœur, 1991; never published, available at Martin Winckler's website. Fragments have been published as Le mystère Marcœur (L’amourier, 2001).
- Neuf contes pour nos enfants, CD, De Vive Voix, 2002.
- Le corps en suspens, stories by Martin Winckler - photographs by Henri Zerdoun, 50 pictures of patients and caregivers, in the hospital and in private practices, Zulma, 2002
- Super Héros, EPA, 2003; (a History of classic comic-book superheroes).
- Odyssée. Une aventure radiophonique, Le Cherche-Midi, 2003; anthology of radio chronicles on France Inter.
- Docteur Je sais tout, chronicles in Spirou HeBDo, readers asked questions to which he gave ironic answers. Illustrations by Johan de Moor.

Préface

- Changer de sexe, Identités transsexuelles, by Stéphanie Nicot and Alexandra Augst-Merelle, Editions Le Cavalier Bleu, 2006
