= Raymond Roussel =

French poet, novelist, playwright, and musician(1877–1933)

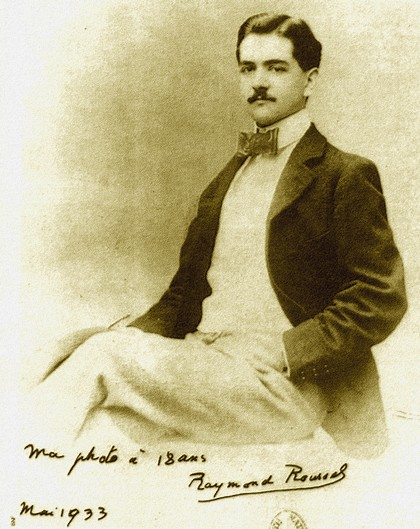
Raymond Roussel (1895)

Raymond Roussel (French: [ʁɛmɔ̃ ʁusɛl]; 20 January 1877 – 14 July 1933) was a French poet, novelist, playwright, musician, and chess enthusiast. Through his novels, poems, and plays he exerted a profound influence on certain groups within 20th century French literature, including the Surrealists, Oulipo, and the authors of the nouveau roman.

== Biography ==
Roussel was born in Paris, the third and last child in his family, with a brother named Georges and a sister named Germaine. In 1893, at age 15, he was admitted to the Paris Conservatoire for piano. A year later, he inherited a substantial fortune from his deceased father and began to write poetry to accompany his musical compositions. At age 17, he wrote Mon Âme, a long poem published three years later in Le Gaulois. By 1896, he had commenced editing his long poem La Doublure when he suffered a mental crisis. After the poem was published on 10 June 1897 and was completely unsuccessful, Roussel began to see the psychiatrist Pierre Janet. In subsequent years, his inherited fortune allowed him to publish his own works and mount luxurious productions of his plays. He wrote and published some of his most important work between 1900 and 1914, and then from 1920 to 1921 traveled around the world. He continued to write for the next decade, but when his fortune finally gave out, he made his way to a hotel in Palermo, where he died of a barbiturate overdose in 1933, aged 56. He is buried in Père-Lachaise cemetery in Paris.

Roussel's most famous works are New Impressions of Africa and Locus Solus, both written according to formal constraints based on homonymic puns. Roussel kept this compositional method a secret until the publication of his posthumous text, How I Wrote Certain of My Books, where he describes it as follows: "I chose two similar words. For example billard (billiard) and pillard (looter). Then I added to it words similar but taken in two different directions, and I obtained two almost identical sentences thus. The two sentences found, it was a question of writing a tale which can start with the first and finish by the second. Amplifying the process then, I sought new words reporting itself to the word billiards, always to take them in a different direction than that which was presented first of all, and that provided me each time a creation moreover. The process evolved/moved and I was led to take an unspecified sentence, of which I drew from the images by dislocating it, a little as if it had been a question of extracting some from the drawings of rebus." For example, Les lettres du blanc sur les bandes du vieux billard/The white letters on the cushions of the old billiard table… must somehow reach the phrase, …les lettres du blanc sur les bandes du vieux pillard/letters [written by] a white man about the hordes of the old plunderer. Although Roussel does state in his posthumous book How I Wrote Certain of My Novels that "It goes without saying that this method was nowhere employed in my other works La Doublure, La Vue and Nouvelles Impressions d'Afrique"; and here could be added the two plays L'étoile au front and La Poussière de soleil.

John Ashbery summarized Locus Solus thus in his introduction to Michel Foucault's Death and the Labyrinth: "A prominent scientist and inventor, Martial Canterel, has invited a group of colleagues to visit the park of his country estate, Locus Solus. As the group tours the estate, Canterel shows them inventions of ever-increasing complexity and strangeness. Again, exposition is invariably followed by explanation, the cold hysteria of the former giving way to the innumerable ramifications of the latter. After an aerial pile driver which is constructing a mosaic of teeth and a huge glass diamond filled with water in which float a dancing girl, a hairless cat, and the preserved head of Danton, we come to the central and longest passage: a description of eight curious tableaux vivants taking place inside an enormous glass cage. We learn that the actors are actually dead people whom Canterel has revived with 'resurrectine,' a fluid of his invention which if injected into a fresh corpse causes it continually to act out the most important incident of its life."

New Impressions of Africa is a 1,274-line poem, consisting of four long cantos in rhymed alexandrines, each a single sentence with parenthetical asides that run up to five levels deep. From time to time, a footnote refers to a further poem containing its own depths of brackets. This impressive nest of brackets carries an assertion — or a recommendation ? — buried by Roussel within a 644 alexandrine poem. In A study on Raymond Roussel, Jean Ferry suggested the notion of a hidden message and transcribed the succession of brackets of Cantos II into the alphabet invented by the painter Samuel Morse : considering each bracket as a dot and the included text as a dash. But due to the missing spaces which separate letters the ensemble of dots and dashes as well as a concealed message remained an hypothesis... until it was deciphered by Jean-Max Albert (another painter), revealing (at least partially) the rousselienne formula, which can't be fortuitous : « RELIVE YOUR DREAMS AWAKE » ( Revis tes rêves en éveil).

== Criticism and legacy ==
Perhaps not surprisingly, Roussel was unpopular during his life and critical reception of his works was almost unanimously negative. Nevertheless, he was admired by the Surrealist group and other avant-garde writers, particularly Michel Leiris, André Breton, and Marcel Duchamp.

He began to be rediscovered in the late 1950s by the Oulipo and Alain Robbe-Grillet. His most direct influence in the Anglophonic world was on the New York School of poets; John Ashbery, Harry Mathews, James Schuyler and Kenneth Koch briefly edited a magazine called Locus Solus after his novel. French theorist Michel Foucault's only book-length work of literary criticism is on Roussel.

French philosopher Gilles Deleuze uses Raymond Roussel's works as one of many examples of repetition in his 1968 work Difference and Repetition.

A comprehensive exhibition of Roussel's achievements entitled "Locus Solus" was exhibited within the Fundação de Serralves in Porto opening on 24 March 2012. Special attention was granted to his personal connections with Man Ray, Salvador Dalí and Marcel Duchamp, who observed that Roussel was "he who pointed the way". Indeed, Duchamp claims in his writings The Trouble with Great Art that “it was fundamentally Roussel who was responsible for my large glass The Bride Stripped Bare by Her Bachelors, Even”.

References to New Impressions of Africa are central to the science-fiction novel The Embedding by Ian Watson (winner of the Prix Apollo in 1975). Roussel (or a version of him) is a major character in the novel The Vorrh by B. Catling.

In 2016, The Raymond Roussel Society was founded in New York by John Ashbery, Michel Butor, Joan Bofill-Amargós, Miquel Barceló, Thor Halvorssen and Hermes Salceda.

== Selected works ==
- 1897 Mon âme, a poem – published on 12 July 1897 in Le Gaulois (revision of 1894 work)
- 1897 La Doublure, a novel in verse
- 1900 La Seine, a novel in verse
- 1900 Chiquenaude, a novel
- 1904 La vue, Le concert and La source, poems
- 1910 Impressions d'Afrique (Impressions of Africa), a novel, later turned into a play
- 1914 Locus Solus, a novel
- 1925 L'étoile au front, a play
- 1926 La Poussière de soleil, a play
- 1932 Nouvelles Impressions d'Afrique (New Impressions of Africa), a poem of four cantos with 59 drawings
- 1935 Comment j'ai écrit certains de mes livres (How I Wrote Certain of my Books, 1995, ISBN 1-878972-14-6), translated by Trevor Winkfield, contains a cross-section of his major writings, including Roussel's essay on how he composed his books, the first chapter of each of Impressions d'Afrique and Locus Solus, the fifth act of a play, the third canto of New Impressions of Africa and all 59 of its drawings, and the outline for a novel Roussel apparently never wrote.
- 1935 Parmi les noirs (Among the Blacks), a story first published in Comment j'ai écrit certains de mes livres, has been republished (Among the Blacks: Two Works (1988, ISBN 0-939691-02-7) with an essay by Ron Padgett.
