= Harry Mathews =

American author

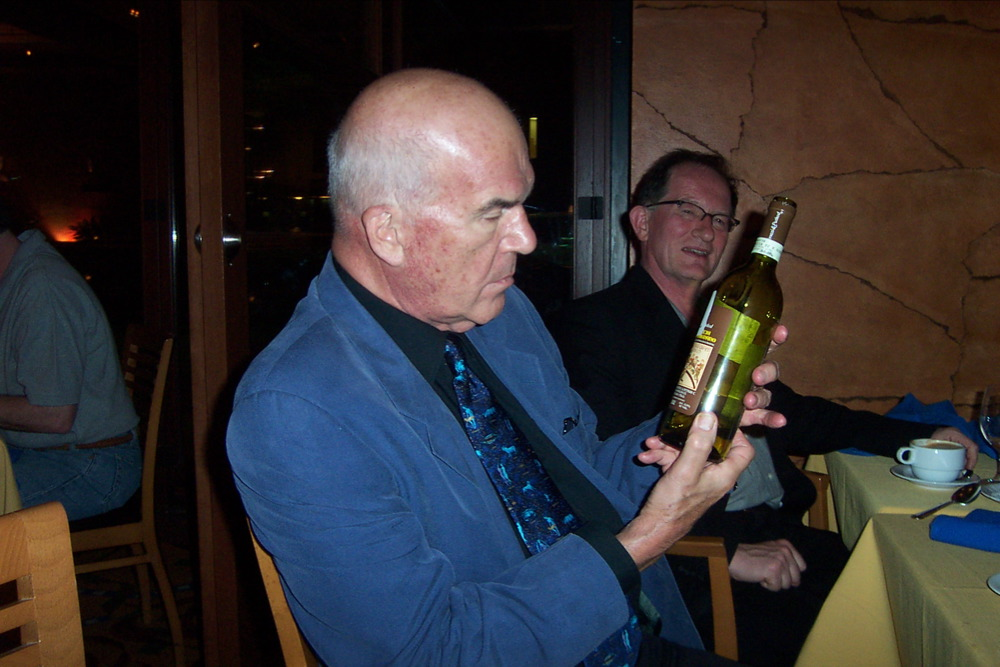
- Harry Mathews in 2004
- Born: February 14, 1930; New York City, U.S.
- Died: January 25, 2017 (aged 86); Key West, Florida, U.S.
- Education: Groton School
- Alma mater: Princeton University; Harvard University (BA)
- Occupation: Author
- Spouses: Niki de Saint Phalle, sculptor (1949-1961); Marie Chaix, writer
- Children: 2
- Writing career
- Genres: Novels, poetry, short fiction, essays, French translation
- Notable works: Tlooth; The Sinking of the Odradek Stadium; Cigarettes

Harry Mathews (February 14, 1930 – January 25, 2017) was an American writer, the author of various novels, volumes of poetry and short fiction, and essays. Mathews was also a translator of the French language.

== Life ==
Born in New York City to an upper-middle-class family, Mathews was educated at private schools there and at the Groton School in Massachusetts, before enrolling at Princeton University in 1947. He left Princeton in his sophomore year for a tour in the United States Navy, during the course of which (in 1949) he eloped with the artist Niki de Saint Phalle, a childhood friend. His military service completed, Mathews transferred to Harvard University in 1950; the couple's first child, Laura Duke Condominas, was born the following year. After Mathews graduated in 1952 with a Bachelor of Arts degree in music, the family moved to Paris, where he continued studies in conducting at I’École Normale de Musique.

A second child, their son Phillip, was born in Majorca, Spain in 1955. Mathews and de Saint Phalle separated in 1960, with the two children remaining under his care.

Together with John Ashbery, James Schuyler, and Kenneth Koch, Mathews founded and edited the short-lived but influential literary journal Locus Solus (named after a novel by Raymond Roussel, one of Mathews's chief early influences) from 1961 to 1962.

Mathews was the first American chosen for membership in the French literary society known as Oulipo, which is dedicated to exploring new possibilities in literature, in particular through the use of various constraints and textual algorithms. The late French writer Georges Perec, likewise a member, was a good friend, and the two translated some of each other's writings. Mathews considered many of his works to be Oulipian in nature, but even before he encountered the group he was working in a parallel direction.

In the 1960s Mathews had a relationship of several years' duration with Paris Review editor Maxine Groffsky. Mathews was later married to the writer Marie Chaix, and divided his time among Paris, Key West, and New York City.

== Novels ==
Mathews's first three novels share a common approach, though their stories and characters are not connected. Originally published as separate works (the third in serialization in The Paris Review), they were gathered in one omnibus volume in 1975 as The Sinking of the Odradek Stadium and Other Novels, but have since been reprinted as individual volumes. Each novel displays the author's taste for improbable narrative invention, his humor, and his delight in leading the reader down obscure avenues of learning.

At the outset of his first novel, The Conversions, the narrator is invited to an evening's social gathering at the home of a wealthy and powerful eccentric named Grent Wayl. During the course of the evening he is invited to take part in an elaborately staged party game, involving, among other things, a race between several small worms. The race having apparently been rigged by Wayl, the narrator is declared the victor and takes home his prize, an adze with curious designs, apparently of a ritual nature, engraved on it. Not long after the party, Wayl dies, and the bulk of his vast estate is left to whoever possesses the adze, providing that he or she can answer three riddling questions relating to its nature. The balance of the book is concerned with the narrator's attempts to answer the three questions, attempts that lead him through a series of digressions and stories-within-a-story, many of them quite diverting in themselves. The book has some superficial affinities with Pynchon's The Crying of Lot 49; the reader, like the narrator, is never sure to what extent he has fallen victim to a hoax. Much of the material dealing with the ritual adze, and the underground cult that it is related to, borrows from Robert Graves's The White Goddess. Mathews's novel concludes with two appendices, one being in German.

His next novel, Tlooth, begins in a bizarre Siberian prison camp, where the inmates are divided according to their affiliation with obscure religious denominations (Americanist, Darbyist, Defective Baptist, and so on), and where baseball, dentistry, and plotting revenge against other inmates are the chief pastimes. A small group of inmates, including the narrator, plot their escape, which they carry out by constructing an ingenious getaway vehicle. After fleeing south and over the Himalayas, they split up; the later sections of the novel, which take place in various locales (chiefly Italy), are concerned with the narrator's attempts to track down and do away with another inmate, Evelyn Roak, who had been responsible for mutilating the narrator's fingers. Most of the major characters have sex-equivocal names, and it is only towards the end of the book that we are given some indication of whether they are actually male or female. As in The Conversions, there are numerous subplots that advance the main action only minimally.

The Sinking of the Odradek Stadium, like The Conversions, is the story of a hunt for treasure, this time told through a series of letters between a Southeast Asian woman named Twang and her American husband, Zachary McCaltex. The couple are researching the fate of a vanished cargo of gold that once belonged to the Medici family. As in the earlier novels, there are various odd occurrences and ambiguous conspiracies; many of the book's set-pieces revolve around a secret society (The Knights of the Spindle), which Zachary is invited to join. Reflecting the author's interest in different languages, one pivotal letter in the book is written in the (fictitious) idiom of Twang's (fictitious) homeland, and to translate it the reader must refer back to earlier chapters to find the meanings of the words. In a typical Mathews conceit, the title of the novel is apparently meaningless until the reader reaches the final pages, at which point it reveals an important twist in the story that is nowhere revealed in the text of the book itself. The novel is provided with an index, which may be deliberately unreliable. David Maurer's The Big Con provided Mathews with a number of slang terms, and possibly some plot elements as well. Another apparent source was The Rise and Decline of the Medici Bank: 1397-1494 by Raymond de Roover; Mathews implicitly acknowledged his debt by introducing de Roover and his wife in the text as minor characters.

Mathews's next novel, Cigarettes, marked a change in his work. Less whimsical but no less technically sophisticated than his first three novels, it consists of an interlocking series of narratives revolving around a small group of interconnected characters. The book's approach to narrative is generally realistic, and Cigarettes is ultimately moving in a way that none of his previous books attempted to be.

My Life in CIA, the last published novel in his lifetime (if it is indeed fiction), was purportedly Mathews's memoir of a period in his life in which he was rumored to be a CIA agent and decided to play along and pretend that he in fact was one.

His final novel, The Solitary Twin, was published posthumously in March 2018 by New Directions.

== Other works ==
Mathews's shorter writings frequently cross or deliberately confuse genres. A case in point is the piece entitled "Country Cooking from Central France: Roast Boned Rolled Stuffed Shoulder of Lamb (Farce Double)." Originally included in an issue of the literary magazine Antaeus devoted to travel essays, it is ostensibly a recipe with extended commentary. (Note: "Country Cooking from Central France: Roast Boned Rolled Stuffed Shoulder of Lamb (Farce Double)" was performed onstage in London at the Cockpit Theatre, Marylebone by the French actor Sam Spiegel but the title was later used for a collection of the author's short stories.)

Mathews used proverbs in many creative ways in his book Selected Declarations of Dependence, which was based on the words found in 46 common English proverbs. He used them to write poems, following self-invented rules. He also created "Perverbs and Paraphrases", complex riddles based on proverbs. In addition, he created anti-proverbs that he called "snips of the tongue", such as "Look before you leave."

Among the more important collections of his miscellaneous works are Immeasurable Distances, a gathering of his essays; The Human Country: New and Collected Stories; and The Way Home: Selected Longer Prose. Other works by Mathews include Twenty Lines a Day, a journal, and The Orchard, a brief memoir of his friendship with Georges Perec. A piece by Mathews was published in 0 to 9 magazine, a 1960s journal which experimented with language and meaning-making.

== Other ==
Mathews invented "Mathews's Algorithm", a method for producing literary works by transposing or permuting elements according to a predetermined set of rules.

== Death ==
Mathews died on January 25, 2017, in Key West, Florida from natural causes, aged 86.

== Appearances in fiction ==
Mathews, along with his second wife Marie Chaix, appears as a minor character in the novels What I Have Written by John A. Scott, The Correspondence Artist by Barbara Browning, and The Hidden Keys by André Alexis. Mathews, among other literary luminaries, makes an appearance as a party guest in Paul Auster's novel 4321.

In Céline Sallette's 2024 biopic film Niki, about Niki de Saint Phalle, Mathews was played by John Robinson.

== Bibliography ==
=== Novels ===
- The Conversions. Random House, New York, 1962. Repr.: Dalkey Archive Press, 1997. ISBN 1-56478-166-6 (novel)
- Tlooth. Paris Review Editions/ Doubleday, Paris/ Garden City, N.Y., 1966. Repr.: Dalkey Archive, 1998. ISBN 1-56478-194-1 (novel)
- The Sinking of the Odradek Stadium. Harper & Row, 1975. Repr.: Dalkey Archive, 1999. ISBN 1-56478-207-7. (novel)
- La cantatrice sauve (1981)
- Plaisirs singuliers. P.O.L., Paris 1983. (fiction, in French). Singular Pleasures. The Grenfell Press, New York 1988. With Francesco Clemente. Dalkey Archive, 1999. ISBN 978-1-56478-233-5
- Cigarettes. Weidenfeld & Nicolson, 1987. Repr.: Dalkey Archive, 1998. ISBN 1-55584-092-2 (novel)
- The Journalist. David R. Godine Books, Boston 1994. Repr.: Dalkey Archive, 1997. ISBN 978-1-56478-165-9. (fiction)
- Sainte Catherine. Editions P.O.L., 2000. (fiction, in French).
- The Solitary Twin. New Directions, 2018. ISBN 978-0-8112-2754-4 (novel)

=== Prose collections ===
- Selected Declarations of Dependence. Z Press, Calais, Vt., 1977. With Alex Katz. Repr.: Sun & Moon, 1996. (poems and short fiction)
- Country Cooking and Other Stories. Burning Deck, Providence, R.I., 1980. ISBN 0-930900-82-0
- The Way Home: Collected Longer Prose. Grenfell Press, New York 1988. With Trevor Winkfield. ISBN 1-900565-05-6. (includes The Orchard, 1988, and Autobiography, from: Contemporary Authors, Autobiography Series. Gale, Detroit 1988)
- The Human Country: New and Collected Stories. Dalkey Archive, 2002. ISBN 1-56478-321-9

=== Poetry ===
- The Ring: Poems 1956-69. Juillard Editions, Leeds, U.K., 1970.
- The Planisphere. Burning Deck, Providence, R.I., 1974 (poetry)
- Le Savoir des rois: poèmes à perverbes. La Bibliothèque oulipienne, no. 5, 1976. (poetry)
- Trial Impressions. Burning Deck, Providence, R.I., 1977. (poetry)
- Armenian Papers: Poems 1954-1984. Princeton University Press, 1987. ISBN 0-691-01440-X
- Out of Bounds Burning Deck, Providence, R. I., 1989. ISBN 0-930901-61-4. (poetry)
- Écrits français. Oulipo, Paris 1990.
- A Mid-Season Sky: Poems 1954-1991. Carcanet, Manchester 1992.
- Epithalamium for Judith Kazantzis and Irving Weinman. Grenfell Press, 1998. (poem). With collages by Marie Chaix.
- Day Shifts. Editions de la Mule de Cristal, Brussels 2004. (poetry). With Jean-Marc Scanreigh.
- The New Tourism. Sand Paper Press, 2010. ISBN 978-0-9843312-3-9 (poems)
- Collected Poems: 1946-2016. Sand Paper Press, 2020. ISBN 978-0-9843312-8-4 (poems)

=== Essays and memoirs ===
- Le Verger. P.O.L., Paris 1986. (memoir, in French). The Orchard: A Remembrance of Georges Perec (Bamberger Books, 1988). (remembrance)
- 20 Lines a Day. Dalkey Archive, Normal, Il., 1988. ISBN 0-916583-41-4. (journal)
- Immeasurable Distances: The Collected Essays. 1991. ISBN 0-932499-43-0
- Giandomenico Tiepolo. Editions Flohic, Charenton 1993. ISBN 2-908958-65-1 (essay)
- The Case of the Persevering Maltese Dalkey Archive, 2003. ISBN 978-1-56478-288-5 (essays)
- My Life in CIA: A Chronicle of 1973. Dalkey Archive Press, 2005. ISBN 1-56478-392-8 (memoir or fiction)

=== Collaborations ===
- S: Semaines de Suzanne (1997), with Jean Echenoz, Mark Polizzotti, Florence Delay, Olivier Rolin, Sonja Greenlee, & Patrick Deville
- Oulipo Compendium (1998), as editor, with Alastair Brotchie. ISBN 0-947757-96-1
- Stefano Baroni, Paul Fournel, Harry Mathews, Boris Tissot: Alphabet Gourmand. Seuil Jeunesse, 1998. ISBN 2-02-030409-0

=== Translations ===
- Georges Bataille: Blue of Noon
- Marie Chaix: Silences, or a Woman's Life
- Marie Chaix: The Laurels of Lake Constance
- Jeanne Cordelier: The Life: Memoirs of a French Hooker
- Georges Perec: Ellis Island, as well as the first part of Ellis Island Revisited: Tales of Vagrancy and Hope (translation and voiceover). INA. 1995.

=== Secondary sources ===
- Leamon, Warren Harry Mathews (1993) ISBN 0-8057-4008-2
- McPherson, William "Harry Mathews: A Checklist" The Review of Contemporary Fiction: Harry Mathews Number (1987)

== See also ==
- The translation of The Dialect of the Tribe in French
