= Cros =

Cros may refer to:

== Communes in France ==
- Cros, Gard, in the Gard department
- Cros, Puy-de-Dôme, in the Puy-de-Dôme department
- Cros-de-Géorand, in the Ardèche department
- Cros-de-Montvert, in the Cantal department
- Cros-de-Ronesque, in the Cantal department
- Cros-de-Cagnes, part of Cagnes-sur-Mer in the Alpes-Maritimes department

== Surname ==
- Antoine-Hippolyte Cros (1833–1903), French surgeon and pretender to the throne of the Kingdom of Araucanía and Patagonia
- Charles Cros (1842–1888), French poet and inventor
- Laure-Therese Cros (1856–1912), pretender to the throne of Kingdom of Araucanía and Patagonia
- Pierrick Cros (footballer, born 1991), French footballer
- Pierrick Cros (footballer, born 1992), French footballer

== Other ==
- CROS hearing aid, a type of hearing aid
- Capacitor Read-Only Storage, used to store microcode on the IBM System/360 Model 50
- ChromeOS, an operating system developed by Google

== See also ==
- CRO (disambiguation)
