= Jacques Bernard =

Jacques Bernard may refer to:

- Jacques Bernard (theologian) (1658–1718), French theologian and publicist
- Jacques Bernard (actor) (1929–2024), French actor
- Jacques Antoine Bernard (1880–1952), French writer and editor
