= Blue Island (disambiguation) =

Blue Island, Illinois is a city in the United States. It may also refer to:

- Blue Island (1982 film), an Italian film
- Blue Island (2022 film), a Hong Kong documentary film
- Blue Island (novel), 1988 novel by Jean Raspail
- Blue Island/Vermont Street station, a Metra station in Blue Island, Illinois
- Blue Island Avenue, a street in Chicago
- Blue Island (album), a 2026 album by Ravyn Lenae
- Blue Island, a song of the album Size Isn't Everything by the Bee Gees

== See also ==
- Blue Islands, a defunct British airline
