= Les Royaumes de Borée =

Book by Jean Raspail

Sept cavaliers
- First edition cover
- Author: Jean Raspail
- Language: French
- Publisher: Éditions Albin Michel
- Publication date: March 2003
- Publication place: France
- Pages: 360
- ISBN: 9782226136978

Les Royaumes de Borée ("the realms of Boreas") is a 2003 novel by the French writer Jean Raspail. The narrative spans from the 17th century to modern times and focuses on Oktavius-Ulrich de Pikkendorff, an officer who is appointed commander of Valduzia, a grand duchy in Karelia. Pikkendorff's task is to guard the border to the Grand North, a legendary continent located to the north of Europe. The novel is a spiritual sequel to Sept cavaliers from 1993.

The novel received the Jules Verne Prize from the Breton Academy. It was the basis for a three-volume comic-book adaptation by Jacques Terpant.

== Reception ==
Jean-Rémi Barland of L'Express described the book as an "epic, sonorous and majestic novel". The critic wrote: "Riding on the counter-current of conformism, the novelist's heroes invest these frontiers of legend, and the plot, running over three centuries, encompasses a host of colourful characters captured in all their wild grandeur."
