= Laure-Therese Cros =

French aristocrat

- Pretender
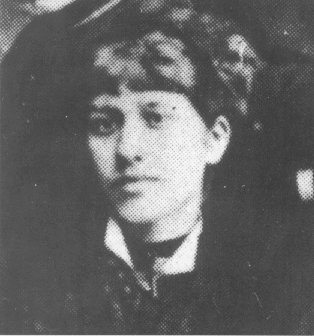
- Born: 22 December 1856; Paris, France
- Died: May 12, 1916 (aged 59); Issy-les-Moulineaux, France
- Throne(s) claimed: Pretender to throne of Kingdom of Araucanía and Patagonia
- Pretend from: 1903–1916
- Father: Antoine-Hippolyte Cros
- Mother: Leonilda Mendès Texeira
- Spouse: Louis Marie Bernard
- Predecessor: Antoine-Hippolyte Cros
- Successor: Jacques Antoine Bernard

Laure-Therese Cros (December 22, 1856, Paris, France – May 12, 1916, Issy-les-Moulineaux, France) was a pretender to the throne of Kingdom of Araucanía and Patagonia.

== Life ==
She was born on December 22, 1856, in Paris, France, to Antoine-Hippolyte Cros and Leonilda Mendès e Texeira. Laure-Therese was the niece of Charles Cros, a poet and inventor, and Henry Cros (fr: Henry Cros), the French poet, painter and sculptor. Her Uncle Henry created a medallion showing the young Laure-Therese.

She married Louis Marie Bernard on November 14, 1877, and was the mother to three sons: Etienne Bernard, Jacques Antoine Bernard who succeeded her as the sovereign of Araucania, and Andre Bernard.

She died February 12, 1916, in Issy-les-Moulineaux, France.

== Pretender to the throne of Araucanía and Patagonia ==
On August 28, 1873, the Criminal Court of Paris ruled that Antoine de Tounens, first "king of Araucania and Patagonia" did not justify his status of the sovereign.

Since the death of Antoine de Tounens, some French citizens without familial relations declared themselves to be pretenders to the throne of Araucania and Patagonia. Whether the Mapuche themselves accept this, or are even aware of it, is unclear.

The pretenders to the throne of Araucania and Patagonia are called monarchs and sovereigns of fantasy, "having only fanciful claims to a kingdom without legal existence and having no international recognition".

On November 1, 1903, she succeeded to his father Antoine-Hippolyte Cros as pretender to the throne of Araucania and Patagonia.

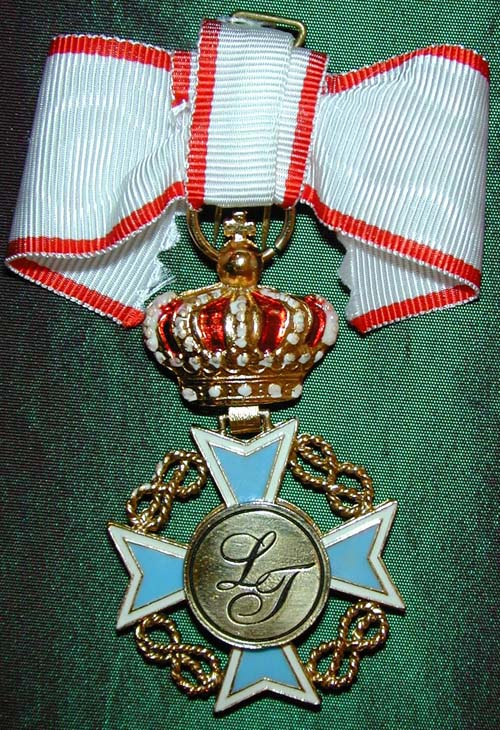
Ordre de la Reine Laure-Thérèse (1958)

== Honours ==
In 1958 Philippe Boiry, pretender to the throne from 1952 to 2014, created a medal of the l'Ordre de la reine Laure-Thérèse in memory of Laure-Thérèse Cros.
