= Philippe Boiry =

Pretender to the throne of the Kingdom of Araucanía and Patagonia

Philippe Paul Alexandre Henri Boiry
- Pretender
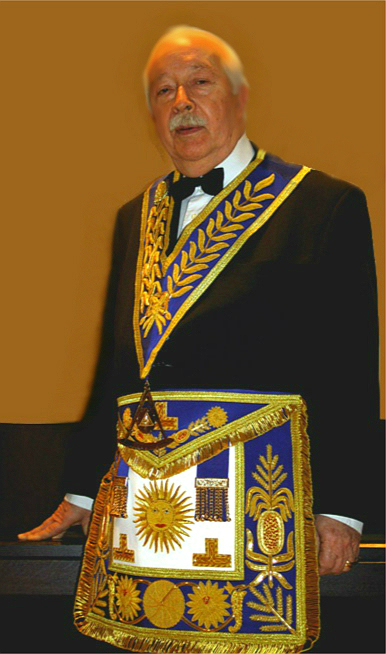
- Born: 19 February 1927; Paris, France
- Died: 5 January 2014 (aged 86); Chourgnac, France
- Title(s): Known as "prince Philippe"
- Throne(s) claimed: pretender to the throne of Kingdom of Araucanía and Patagonia
- Pretend from: 1952-2014
- Spouse: Jacqueline-Dominique Marquain (1950–1978); Elisabeth de Chavigny (1996–2006)
- Predecessor: Jacques Antoine Bernard
- Successor: Jean-Michel Parasiliti di Para

Philippe Paul Alexandre Henri Boiry (February 19, 1927 – January 5, 2014) was a journalist and a pretender to the throne of the Kingdom of Araucanía and Patagonia from October 26, 1952, to January 5, 2014.

== Personal life ==
Philippe Paul Alexandre Henri Boiry was the son of Ferdinand Boiry and Jeanne Reynaud. In 1950 he married Jacqueline Marquain (1927–1978) and in 1996 he married Élisabeth Jeanne de Chavigny (1939–2006). He had no children from his two marriages.

In 1980, he founded a school of communication in Levallois-Perret (France).

=== Pretender to the throne of Araucanía and Patagonia ===
On August 28, 1873, the Criminal Court of Paris ruled that Antoine de Tounens, first "king of Araucania and Patagonia" did not justify his status of sovereign.

Since the death of Antoine de Tounens, some French citizens without familial relations declared themselves to be pretenders to the throne of Araucania and Patagonia. Whether the Mapuche themselves accept this, or are even aware of it, is unclear.

In 1952 Philippe Boiry claimed that Jacques Antoine Bernard pretender to the throne of Araucanie and Patagonia abdicated in his favour. Until his death in 2014 he claimed to be pretender to the throne of Araucania and Patagonie under the name "prince Phillippe I".

In 1989 he visited Mapuche and Tehuelche lands for the first time. When he visited Argentina and Chile once, he met with hostility by the local media and cold shoulder by most of the Mapuche organisations.

In 1996 an Argentine journalist claimed that the king of Patagonia was an impostor and his titles « as false as his presumed majesty », Philippe Boiry tried to sue him, but the case was thrown by the court of Paris for the reason that Philippe Boiry could not justify the titles he claimed.

Some historians describe the Kingdom of Araucanía as a "curious and semi-comic episode".

The pretenders to the throne of Araucania and Patagonia are called monarchs and sovereigns of fantasy, « having only fanciful claims to a kingdom without legal existence and having no international recognition ». On August 28, 1873, the Criminal Court of Paris ruled that Antoine de Tounens, first king of Araucania and Patagonia did not justify his status of sovereign.

In 1965 Philippe Boiry founded the association Auspice Stella which claims to defend the cause of the Mapuches.

Philippe Boiry died on 5 January 2014 in Chourgnac d'Ans (France).
