= Frédéric Luz =

French writer and heraldist (born 1964)

- Pretender
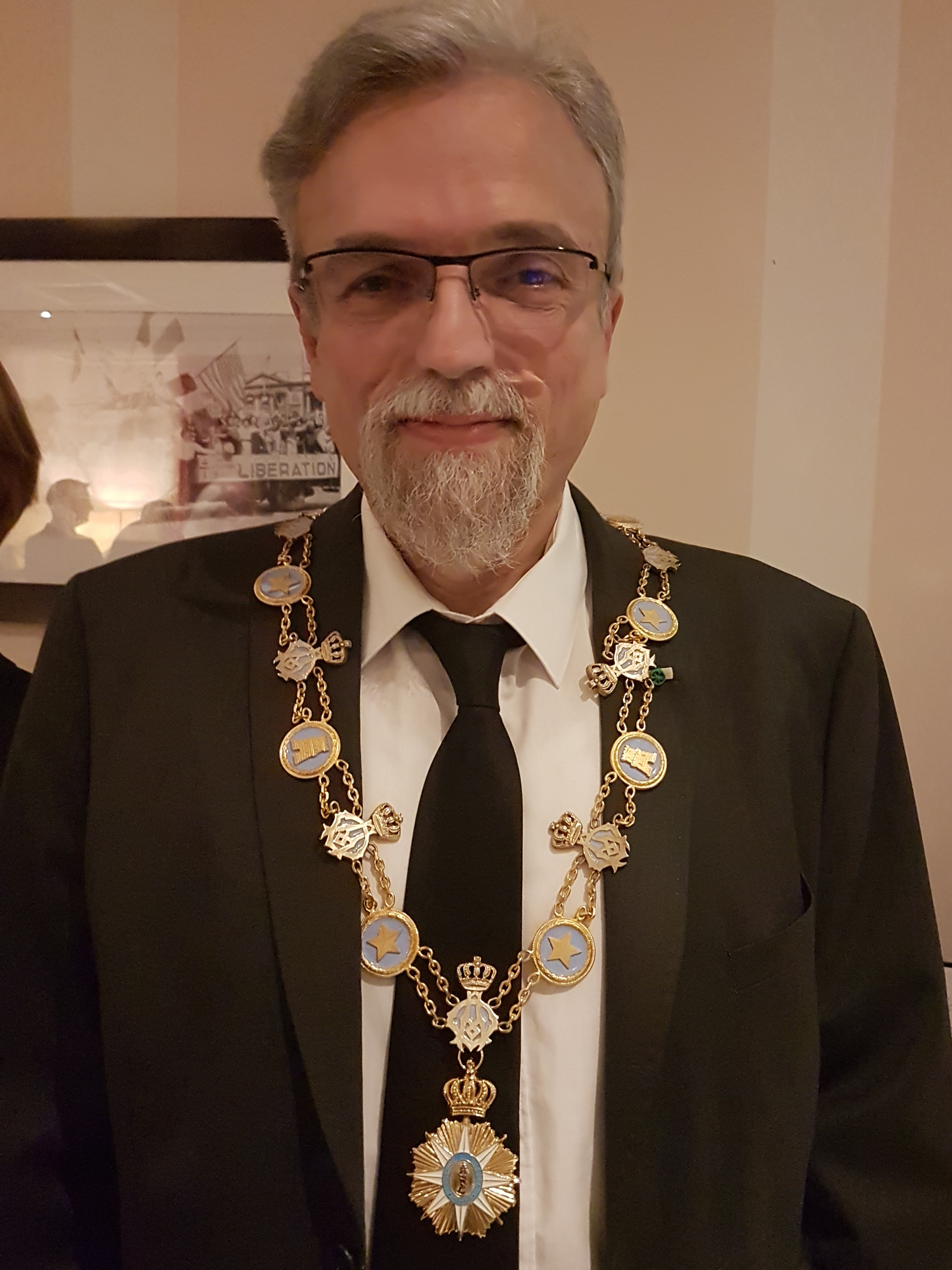
- Born: 9 March 1964 (age 62); Toulouse, France
- Throne(s) claimed: Kingdom of Araucanía and Patagonia
- Pretend from: 2018-2024
- Spouse: Anne Marie Lauzeral
- Children: 2
- Predecessor: Jean-Michel Parasiliti di Para as known as Prince Antoine IV of Araucania and Patagonia

Frédéric Rodriguez-Luz (born 9 March 1964) is a French writer and heraldist. He is also a former pretender to the throne of the Kingdom of Araucanía and Patagonia, a 19th-century self-proclaimed unrecognised state, from 2018 to 2024.

== Life and work ==
Frédéric Nicolas Jacques Rodriguez-Luz was born on 9 March 1964 in Toulouse. His Spanish grandfather settled in France after seeking exile from Francoist Spain.

Since 1984, Frédéric Luz has worked professionally as a heraldist and has published a number of works on heraldry. He was a heraldic advisor to Henri d'Orléans, Count of Paris. In 2003 and 2004, Luz created coats of arms for cities and government ministries in the Republic of Senegal, as well as for Senegalese Presidents Léopold Sédar Senghor and Abdoulaye Wade. For his work, he was made a Commander of the National Order of the Lion of Senegal. Luz lives in France and was married to Anne Marie Lauzeral, who died October 5, 2020. He has two children.

== Pretender to the throne of Araucanía and Patagonia ==
Personal coat of arms of Frédéric I

On 28 August 1873, the Criminal Court of Paris ruled that Antoine de Tounens, first "king of Araucania and Patagonia" did not justify his status of sovereign.

Since the death of Antoine de Tounens, seven French citizens have been successively appointed as sovereigns of Araucania and Patagonia. These were King Achilles I; Prince Antoine II; Queen Laure-Therese; Prince Antoine III; Prince Philippe I; Prince Antoine IV and the present sovereign, Prince Frederic I.

French lawyer Orellie Antoine de Tounens was appointed by the highest Mapuche Lonko's (chiefs) of the nation, among them Lonko's Kilapan and Kalfukura and the Mapuche High Toki, Magnil, in a traditional indigenous Mapuche constituent assembly, thus assuming the title King Orellie Antoine I of Araucania and high Toki (high chief of war) in a traditional indigenous Mapuche Parliament known as a Futa Koyang (in mapuzugun Mapuche language) on 17 November 1860. The Kingdoms councils were composed entirely of Mapuche citizens as follows: Lonko's Kalfukura (son of Lonko Huentecurá) - Minister of Justice; Lonko Kilapan-Minister of War (son of High Toki Magnil (1800–1860); Lonko Montril - Minister of Foreign Affairs; Lonko Quilahueque - Home Secretary; Lonko Marihual - Minister for Agriculture.

Lonkos, Lemunao, Huenchuman, Huentecol, among others, also actively participated in the creation of the Kingdom.

The Kingdom of Araucanía and Patagonia was represented by Auspice Stella, a French non-profit organization whose purpose was to fight for the recognition of Mapuche human rights and self-determination from 2013 until July 2023 when all Mapuche members of the organisation were expelled and the human rights departments eliminated by four former members of the Kingdom serving as the board of directors and by the director general of the NGO.

Frédéric Luz became actively involved in the work of the Kingdom of Araucania and Patagonia in 2014. Jean-Michel Parasiliti di Para also known as Prince Antoine IV of Araucania and Patagonia named him minister of communications and judge of arms of the Kingdom of Araucania and Patagonia. He was also made vice-president of Auspice Stella which works to promote Mapuche rights.

On March 24, 2018, Frédéric Luz was elected pretender to the throne of Araucania and Patagonia.

== Dynastic succession and end of reign ==
On May 12, 2025, in accordance with the 2016 Additional Act to the Constitution of the Kingdom of Araucania and Patagonia, Laurent Lafayne was elected Prince under the name Antoine V. This election was officially endorsed by Prince Frédéric I, marking a legitimate and consensual dynastic transition within the Royal House.

The succession follows the symbolic monarchical tradition of the Kingdom, rooted in customary law and the principle of free designation. It reflects a commitment to continuity in humanitarian and cultural advocacy for the Mapuche people, while embracing a modernized and structured vision of the princely role.

Antoine V, co-founder of the Order of the Southern Star, continues the initiatives launched by Frédéric I, particularly in promoting indigenous rights and preserving Mapuche cultural heritage.

== Works ==
- Armorial de France et d'Europe, No. 1, (Courtnay, 1990)
- Armorial de France et d'Europe, No. 2, (Gaillac: La Place royale éditions, 1991)
- Le soufre & l'encens: Enquête sur les Eglises parallèles et les évêques dissidents, (Paris: C. Vigne, 1995)
- Le blason & ses secrets: Retrouver ou créer ses armoiries aujourd'hui, (Paris: C. Vigne, 1995)
- Blasons des familles d'Europe: Grand armorial universel, (Gaillac: La Place royal éditions, 1996)
- Dictionnaire du blason / L.-A. Duhoux d'Argicourt, preface by Frederic Luz, (Gaillac: La Place royale éditions, 1996)
- Armorial de France et d'Europe, No. 6, (Gaillac: La Place royal éditions, 1998)
- Orthodoxie, (Puiseaux : Pardès, 2001)
- Armorial de France et d'Europe, (Gaillac: La Place royale éditions, 2002)
- Armorial de France et d'Europe, (Gaillac: La Place royale éditions, 2005)

== Honours ==
- Commander of the National Order of the Lion
