= Moi, Antoine de Tounens, roi de Patagonie =

Novel by the French writer Jean Raspail

- 1981 paperback edition
- Author: Jean Raspail
- Language: French
- Publisher: Éditions Albin Michel
- Publication date: 2 May 1981
- Publication place: France
- Pages: 297
- ISBN: 2226011390

Moi, Antoine de Tounens, roi de Patagonie is a 1981 novel by the French writer Jean Raspail. It tells the story of the French adventurer Orélie-Antoine de Tounens, who in 1860 declared the independence of the Kingdom of Araucanía and Patagonia, located in South America, where he held the title of king for the next 18 years. The sovereignty of the country was not respected by Chile and Argentina, whose authorities regarded Tounens as insane. The title of the book means "I, Antoine de Tounens, King of Patagonia".

The novel was published on 2 May 1981 through éditions Albin Michel. It received the 1981 Grand Prix du roman de l'Académie française. It was the basis for the 1990 film Le roi de Patagonie, starring Frédéric van den Driessche and Omar Sharif.

== See also ==
- 1981 in literature
- French literature
