= Le Jeu du Roi =

1976 novel by Jean Raspail

Le Jeu du Roi ("the king's game") is a 1976 novel by the French writer Jean Raspail. It focuses on the subject of the Kingdom of Araucanía and Patagonia. It was published by éditions Robert Laffont.

== Adaptation ==
The novel was the basis for the 1988 film Letter from Patagonia. The film was directed by Marc Evans and stars Pierre Dux.
