= Jean-Michel Parasiliti di Para =

- Pretender
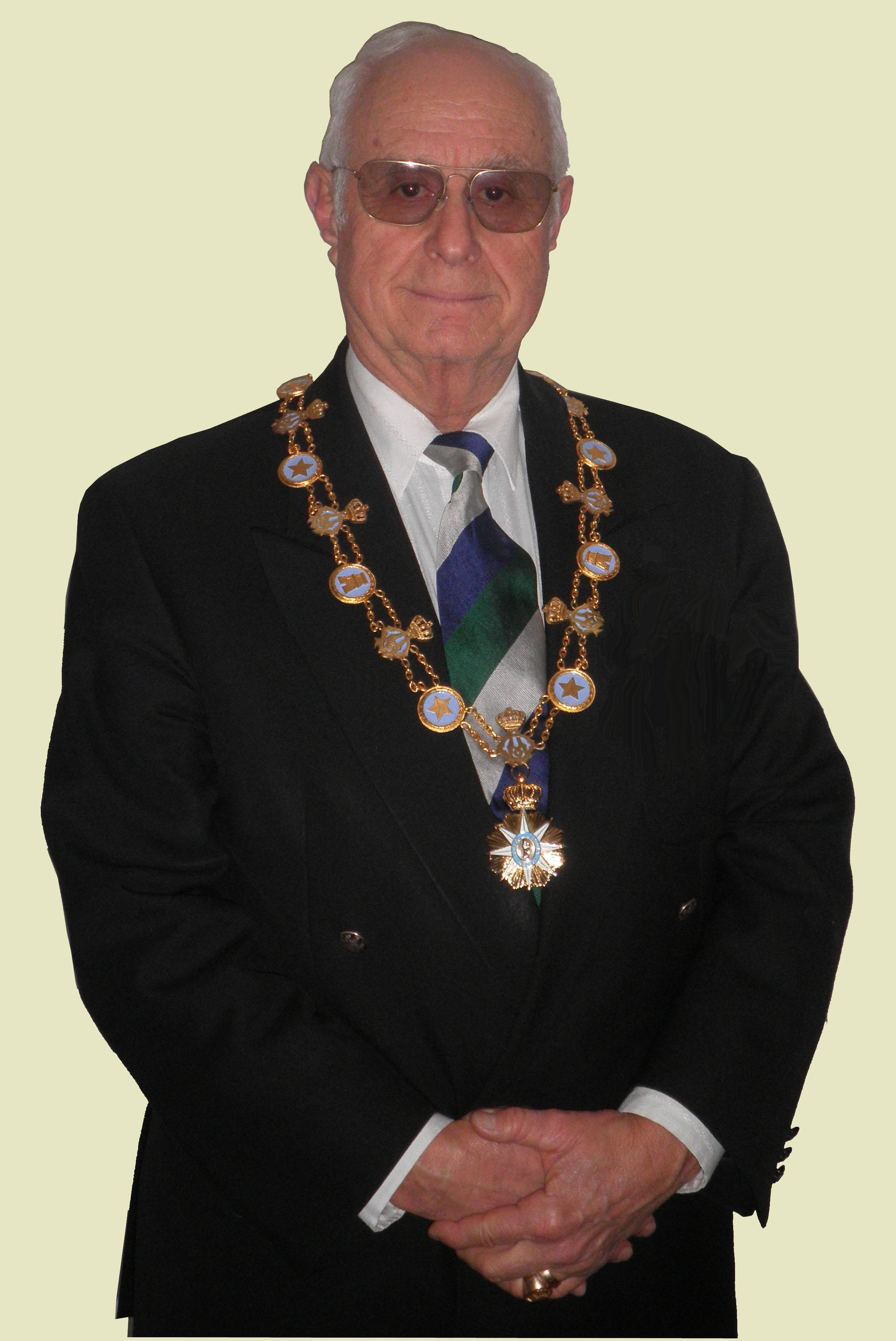
- Born: 26 March 1942; Aix-en-Provence, France
- Died: 16 December 2017 (aged 75); Marmande, France
- Title(s): Known as "King Antoine IV"
- Throne(s) claimed: Kingdom of Araucanía and Patagonia
- Pretend from: 2014–2017
- Spouse: Sheila Rani Baichoo
- Children: 2
- Predecessor: Philippe Boiry
- Successor: Frédéric Luz

Jean-Michel Parasiliti di (or dit) Para (26 March 1942 – 16 December 2017) was the pretender to the throne of the Kingdom of Araucanía and Patagonia under the name of Antoine IV from 9 January 2014 to 16 December 2017. The kingdom has been described as "an ephemeral 19th-century state" and as a "strange symbolic monarchy".

== Biography ==
=== Early life and work ===
Jean-Michel Parasiliti was a French military veteran who served in the Algerian War, being awarded the Combatant's Cross, the North Africa Medal, and the North Africa Security and Order Operations Commemorative Medal, with Algeria bar, among others. After his career in the military he turned to social work, specializing in the care of children and adults with intellectual disabilities. He received a range of national civil honours including the National Order of Merit (in 1995) and the Order of Academic Palms. He was married, with two children, and was of Sicilian descent. He held a doctorate in the history of civilization.

=== Pretender to the throne of Araucanía and Patagonia ===
The Kingdom of Araucanía and Patagonia is an unrecognised state associated with the Mapuche people, of which there are approximately 1.5 million in Chile and 200,000 in Argentina. After the death in 2014 of the former pretender Philippe Boiry, Parasiliti succeeded on 9 January 2014 as pretender to the throne of the Kingdom of Araucanía and Patagonia under the name of Antoine IV. Whether the Mapuche themselves accepted this, or were even aware of it, has not always been clear.

The Kingdom of Araucanía and Patagonia has been called a "curious and semi-comic episode" and the pretenders to the "throne" have been described as monarchs and sovereigns of fantasy, "having only fanciful claims to a kingdom without legal existence and having no international recognition". There does appear, however, to be increasing recognition of the role in defending Mapuche rights assumed by this "strange symbolic monarchy." It has been reported that "the intensification of the Mapuche conflict in recent years has given a new purpose to the Kingdom of Araucania and Patagonia, long considered an absurdity by French society."

Parasiliti died on 16 December 2017. He was succeeded as pretender to the throne by Frédéric Luz.

== Honours ==
National Honours

- Officer of the National Order of Merit (1995).
- Officer of the Order of Academic Palms.
- Officer of the Order of Agricultural Merit.
- Combatant's Cross.
- North Africa Medal.
- North Africa Security and Order Operations Commemorative Medal, with Algeria bar.

Foreign Honours

- Knight Grand Cross of Justice of the Order of Saint Lazarus (2005)
