= Jacques Terpant =

French comics artist

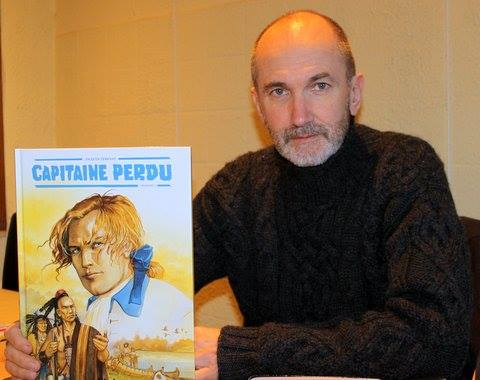
Terpant in 2016

Jacques Terpant, born 11 April 1957 in Romans-sur-Isère, Drôme, is a French comics artist. He debuted in 1982 with the comic book Branle-bas de combat, made together with Luc Cornillon. His style is inspired by Jean Giraud.

In 2011 he received the Prix Saint-Michel for best artwork, for the third volume of his Sept cavaliers series, which is based on Jean Raspail's novel with the same title.

== Bibliography ==
- Branle-bas de combat (1982) with Luc Cornillon (Humanoïdes Associés).
- New-York inferno (1983), scenario Doug Headline (Magic Strip).
- La citadelle pourpre (1988), scenario Doug Headline (Éditions Delcourt).
- Le Céleste (1988), scenario Tourette (Éditions Delcourt).
- Le Passage de la saison morte (2 volumes, 1989–1990)
- La Blessure du Khan (1990), scenario Cailleteau, éditions Zenda.
- Messara (3 volumes, 1994–1996)
- Méditerranéennes (1996), éditions Jotim
- Pirates (5 volumes, 2001–2007)
- Le Château des femmes (2002), text by Françoise Rey (Éditions IPM).
- Contes et Légendes des Monts du Matin (2008), text by Patrick Bellier, éditions Glénat.
- Sept Cavaliers (3 volumes, 2008–2010), based on Sept cavaliers by Jean Raspail
- Le Royaume de Borée (3 volumes, 2011–2014), based on Les Royaumes de Borée by Jean Raspail
- Capitaine perdu (2 volumes, 2015–2016), éditions Glénat, based on the life of Louis Groston de Saint-Ange de Bellerive.
- L'Imagier de Jacques Terpant (2015), éditions Sandawe.
