= Blue Island (novel) =

1988 book by Jean Raspail

- First edition
- Author: Jean Raspail
- Original title: L'Île bleue
- Translator: Jeremy Leggatt
- Language: French
- Publisher: Éditions Robert Laffont
- Publication date: 1988
- Publication place: France
- English publication date: 1991
- Pages: 244
- ISBN: 9782221056592

Blue Island (French: L'Île bleue) is a 1988 novel by the French writer Jean Raspail. The narrative is set in Touraine during World War II, where a charismatic boy gathers his friends on an island, where they play war games which become increasingly more interlinked with reality. The book was published in English in 1991, translated by Jeremy Leggatt.

The book was adapted into the 2001 television film L'Île bleue. The film was directed by Nadine Trintignant.

== Reception ==
Kirkus Reviews described the books as "a touching story about coming of age under less-than-ideal circumstances. ... [T]he dovetailing here of adolescent bravado and cynicism with historical drama makes for a mostly satisfying mixture." Publishers Weekly called it a "spellbinding fable", and wrote that "this is no myth-like Lord of the Flies. Contemporary history is an ever-present element, as German troops advance, France falls apart, the government evacuates Paris and refugees flood the countryside. ... Raspail (Who Will Remember the People) narrowly avoids sentimentality in this powerful depiction of an end to innocence and illusion."
