= Welcome, Honourable Visitors =

Novel by Jean Raspail

- First edition cover
- Author: Jean Raspail
- Original title: Le Vent des Pins
- Translator: Jean Stewart
- Language: French
- Publisher: Éditions Julliard
- Publication date: 1958
- Publication place: France
- English publication date: 1960
- Pages: 236

Welcome, Honourable Visitors (French: Bienvenue honorables visiteurs) is a 1958 novel by the French writer Jean Raspail. It tells the story of six foreign tourists who travel in Japan and stay at an inn. It was Raspail's first novel, having previously published several travel books. It was first published as Le Vent des Pins, which is the name of the inn in the story, but changed title when it was republished in 1970.

== Publication ==
The novel was first published in 1958 by éditions Julliard with the title Le Vent des Pins. An English translation by Jean Stewart was published in 1960. In the United Kingdom it was published by Hamish Hamilton as Welcome, Honourable Visitors and in the United States by G. P. Putnam's Sons as Welcome Honorable Visitors. It was republished in French in 1970 as Bienvenue honorables visiteurs.

== Reception ==
John Coleman reviewed the book in The Spectator: "M. Raspail is quite astute, works his expected ironies neatly enough, and would probably have made more money publishing the local colour bits as articles in Life."
