= Ndioro Ndiaye =

Senegalese doctor and politician

Deputy Director-General of the International Organization for Migration
- In office 1999–2009

Minister for Women, Children's and Family Affairs
- In office 1990–1999

Minister for Social Development
- In office 1988

Personal details
- Born: 6 November 1946 (age 79)
- Occupation: doctor and politician

Ndioro Ndiaye (born 1946) is a Senegalese doctor and politician. From 1999 to 2009 she was Deputy Director-General of the International Organization for Migration (IOM).

== Life ==
Ndioro Ndiaye was born on 6 November 1946 in Bignona. She was educated at the Cheikh Anta Diop University and Paris Diderot University. In the 1970s she was a medical doctor and lecturer, and was one of the first African women to gain an agrégation in France, specializing in odontology and stomatology. She was the first woman to head the department of odontology and stomatology at Cheikh Anta Diop University. From 1982 to 1988 she was a Technical Adviser to Senegal's Ministry of Public Health.

In 1988 she was appointed Minister for Social Development in Senegal. During the 1989 Mauritania–Senegal Border War, she conducted humanitarian activities on behalf of the Senegal government, helping displaced people from both Senegal and Mauritania. From 1990 to 1995 she was Minister for Women, Children's and Family Affairs. From 1995 to 1999 she resumed work at Cheikh Anta Diop University, but was increasingly active in international activities, including the United Nations Decade for Women world summits on women in 1990 and 1995. She helped found the Scientific Commission for Women and Development and the Network of African Women Leaders for Peace and Development.

In 1999 she was elected Deputy Director-General of the IOM, winning a second term in 2004 before retiring from the IOM in 2009. She subsequently founded the Dakar-based Alliance for Migration, Leadership and Development, and remains its president.

She has been made a Chevalier of the Legion of Honour in France, and a Commander of the National Order of the Lion in Senegal.
