= Antoine-Hippolyte Cros =

- Pretender
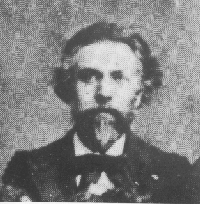
- Born: 10 May 1833; Paris, France
- Died: 1 November 1903 (aged 70)
- Title(s): Known as "King Antoine II of Araucania'
- Throne(s) claimed: Kingdom of Araucanía and Patagonia
- Pretend from: 1902-1903
- Spouse: Leonilla Mendes
- Predecessor: Achille Laviarde
- Successor: Laure-Therese Cros

Antoine-Hippolyte Cros (10 May 1833 – 1 November 1903) was a French surgeon and pretender to the throne of the defunct Kingdom of Araucanía and Patagonia.

== Personal ==
Antoine-Hippolyte Cros was born in Lagrasse, France, on 10 May 1833, to the philosopher Simon Charles Henry Cros (1803–1876) and Josephine Thor. He was the grandson of grammarian Antoine Cros (1769–1844). He was also the brother of the poet and inventor of the phonograph, Charles Cros (1842–1888) and the painter and sculptor Henry Cros (1840–1907) (fr: Henry Cros). Antoine-Hippolyte was married in Paris on 5 March 1856 to Leonilda Méndez de Texeira, an aristocratic lady of Portuguese origin. The couple had two children, Laure-Therese Cros (22 December 1856 – 12 February 1916), who succeeded him as Queen of Araucania and Patagonia, and Juliette Cros (20 November 1868 – 27 April 1945).

== Pretender to the throne of Araucanía and Patagonia ==
On 28 August 1873 the Criminal Court of Paris ruled that Antoine de Tounens, first "king of Araucania and Patagonia" did not justify his status of sovereign.

The pretenders to the throne of Araucania and Patagonia are called monarchs and sovereigns of fantasy, "having only fanciful claims to a kingdom without legal existence and having no international recognition".

Since the death of Antoine de Tounens, some French citizens without familial relations declared themselves to be pretenders to the throne of Araucania and Patagonia. Whether the Mapuche themselves accept this, or are even aware of it, is unclear.

At the death of Achille Laviarde on 6 March 1902 Antoine-Hippolyte Cros was elected pretender to the throne of Araucania and Patagonia until his own death on 1 November 1903.

After his death, his daughter Laure-Therese Cros succeeded him as pretender to the throne of Araucania and Patagonia.
