= Le Roi au-delà de la mer =

2000 novel by Jean Raspail

- First edition
- Author: Jean Raspail
- Language: French
- Publisher: Éditions Albin Michel
- Publication date: January 2000
- Publication place: France
- Pages: 184
- ISBN: 9782226114310

Le Roi au-delà de la mer ("The King Over the Water" as it deliberately and knowingly evokes the Stuart exile from Britain) is a 2000 novel by the French writer Jean Raspail. The book is written as a series of letters from a mentor to the young king of France, who sets up his court on a small island in order to avoid the disgracefulness of the contemporary world. Raspail uses the book to reject what he describes as "magazine princes" and champions a monarchism that is not merely for decorative purposes.

== Reception ==
Éric Deschodt of L'Express wrote: "The French monarchists of today are mainly concerned with nostalgia and disappointment. The nostalgia can only be vague: the Capetians are far away. The disappointment is more precise: when it comes to power and influence, the France of today and that of the American Revolutionary War when Louis XVI reigned have nothing more in common than the name and the territory. Implied or declared, the beautiful regrets of Jean Raspail won't persuade [left-wing presidential candidate] Jean-Pierre Chevènement who has already taken sides, but many others will be touched, without being attached to either throne or altar."
