= Charles Cros =

French poet and inventor (1842-1888)

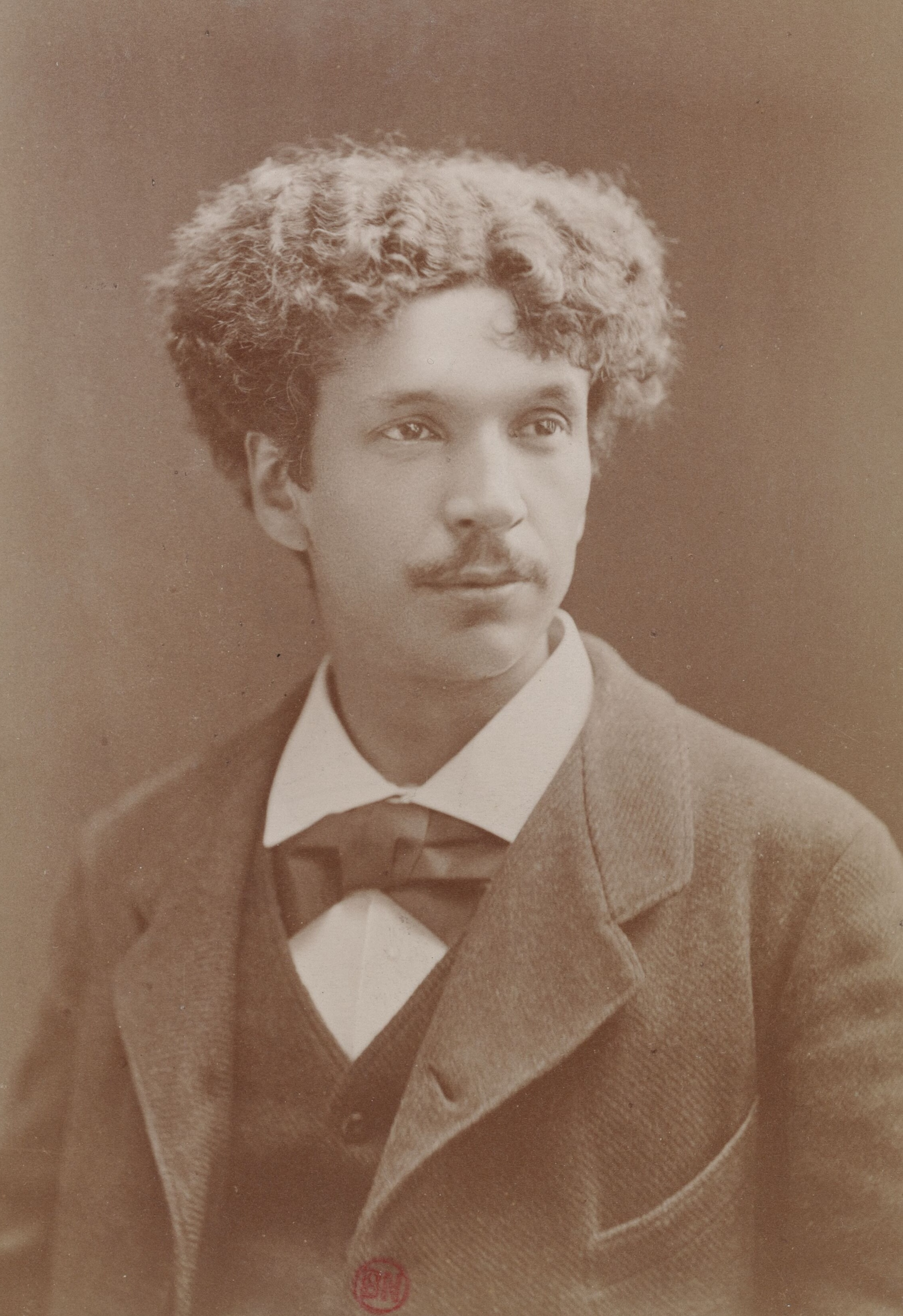
- Born: 1 October 1842; Fabrezan, Aude, France
- Died: 9 August 1888 (aged 45); Paris
- Known for: Poetry; Monologues; Paleophone sound reproduction Color photography methods Fax transmission methods

Charles Cros or Émile-Hortensius-Charles Cros (1 October 1842 – 9 August 1888) was a French poet and inventor. He was born in Fabrezan, Aude.

Cros was a well-regarded poet and humorous writer. As an inventor, he was interested in the fields of transmitting graphics by telegraph and making photographs in color, but he is perhaps best known for being the first person to conceive a method for reproducing recorded sound, an invention he named the paleophone.

Charles Cros died in Paris at the age of 45.

== Early life and education ==
Cros was born to the philosopher Simon Charles Henry Cros and Josephine Thor. He was the grandson of grammarian Antoine Cros. Cros was the brother of the painter and sculptor Henry Cros and of Antoine-Hippolyte Cros, a surgeon who was also a pretender to the throne of the defunct Kingdom of Araucanía and Patagonia from 6 March 1902 until 1 November 1903, and the uncle of Laure-Therese Cros who was the Queen of Araucania and Patagonia from 1 November 1903 until 12 February 1916.

In 1860 Cros began studies in medicine, but he soon abandoned them for a life of literary and scientific pursuits.

In the early 1880s, Charles Cros was a member of the Hydropathic Society and part of the fumist group led by Alphonse Allais and Eugène Bataille.

== Inventions ==
=== Photography ===
Cros almost invented colour photography. In 1869 he published a theory of color photography in which he proposed that a single scene could be photographed through glass filters colored green, violet, and orange. The three negatives obtained through those filters could be developed to produce positive impressions that contained varying amounts of red, yellow, and blue (the "antichromatic" or complementary colors of the filters). The three positive impressions, when superimposed on one another (for instance, by making three carbon prints using sufficiently transparent pigments, then transferring the pigmented gelatin onto a single support sheet), would recompose the original colors of the photographed scene. Cros's proposals, which anticipated the subtractive method of modern photography, were similar to more influential ideas advanced about the same time by Louis Ducos du Hauron. The same day, 7 May 1869, Charles Cros and Louis Ducos du Hauron presented their method of creating color photographs to the French Society of Photography. They had not been in communication beforehand, and each knew nothing about the other's research. Cros ended up conceding the invention to Ducos du Hauron, despite having deposited a sealed paper at the French Academy of Sciences on 2 December 1867. Ducos du Hauron had patented his ideas on 28 November 1868, almost a full year later, but claimed to have written an unpublished paper on the subject in 1862.

=== Phonograph ===
Cros almost invented the phonograph. As far as is known, no one before him had thought of a practical way to reproduce sound from a recording of airborne sound waves. He gave the Greek name 'paleophone' ('voix du passé', tr. 'voice of the past') to his invention. On 30 April 1877, he submitted a sealed envelope containing a letter to the Academy of Sciences in Paris explaining his proposed method. The letter stated in French, "Un index léger est solidaire du centre de figure d'une membrane vibrante; il se termine par une pointe [...] qui repose sur une surface noircie à la flamme." The English translation is one close to this: "A lightweight armature is fixed to the center of the face of a vibrating membrane; it ends with a sharp point [...] which rests on a lamp-blacked surface." This surface is integral with a disc driven by a double movement of rotation and linear progression. The system is reversible: when the tip follows the furrow the membrane restores the original acoustic signal. The letter was read in public on December 3 following. In his letter, after having shown that his method consisted of detecting an oscillation of a membrane and using the tracing to reproduce the oscillation with respect to its duration and intensity, Cros added that a cylindrical form for the receiving apparatus seemed to him to be the most practical, as it allowed for the graphic inscription of the vibrations by means of a very fine-threaded screw. An article on the paleophone was published in "la semaine du Clergé" on 10 October 1877, written by l'Abbé Leblanc. Cros proposed metal for both the engraving tool attached to the diaphragm and the receiving material for durability.

Before Cros had a chance to follow up on this idea or attempt to construct a working model, Thomas Alva Edison introduced his first working phonograph in the US. Edison used a cylinder covered in tinfoil for his first phonograph, patenting this method for reproducing sound on 15 January 1878.

=== Martian communication mirror ===
Cros was convinced that pinpoints of light observed on Mars and Venus, probably high clouds illuminated by the sun, were the lights of large cities on those planets. He spent years petitioning the French government to build a giant mirror that could be used to communicate with the Martians and Venusians by burning giant lines on the deserts of those planets. He was never convinced that the Martians were not a proven fact, nor that the mirror he wanted was technically impossible to build.

== Poetry ==
In the early 1870s Cros was published in the short-lived weekly Renaissance littéraire et artistique, edited by Émile Blémont. Other contributors included Stéphane Mallarmé, Auguste Villiers de l'Isle-Adam, and Paul Verlaine.

His poem The Kippered Herring inspired Ernest Coquelin to create what he called monologues, short theatrical pieces whose format was copied by numerous imitators. The piece, translated as The Salt Herring, was translated and illustrated by Edward Gorey.

== Personal life ==
Cros had a love affair from 1867 to 1877 with Nina de Callias.

== Bibliography ==
=== Non-fiction ===
- Solution générale du problème de la photographie des couleurs (1869)

=== Poetry ===
- Le Coffret de santal (1873 and 1879)
- Plainte (1873)
- Le Fleuve (1874)
- La Vision du Grand Canal des Deux Mers (1888)
- Le Collier de griffes (posthumous, 1908)

== English translations published in the United States ==
- Charles Cros: Collected Monologues Translated by Doug Skinner (Black Scat Books, ISBN 978-1732350625, 2018)
- Upside-Down Stories Translated by Doug Skinner (Black Scat Books, ISBN 978-1732350687, 2019)
- The Science of Love and Other Writings Translated, with an introduction, by Doug Skinner (Wakefield Press, ISBN 978-1-939663-95-5, 2024)

== Legacy ==
The Académie Charles Cros, the French equivalent of the US Recording Academy, is named in his honor.

Cros was a member of the group known as the hydropathes, which existed around the period 1878–1881. Charles Cros, played by Christopher Chaplin, appears in the film Total Eclipse, about the lives of Paul Verlaine and Arthur Rimbaud. Cros is seen for a few seconds at Le Chat Noir in Paris, a café which opened in 1881 and had become the home for the avant-garde art scene of the time.

French composer Angèle Ravizé used Cros’ text in her song “Ronde Flamande.”

Marie Corelli published one of his poems posthumously in the text of her 1890s book, Wormwood, with a special note of respect to the recently deceased author.

== See also ==
- L'Académie Charles Cros
- Zutiste
