= En canot sur les chemins d'eau du Roi =

2005 book by Jean Raspail

- First edition
- Author: Jean Raspail
- Cover artist: Currier and Ives, The Falls of Niagara-From the Canada side - 1868
- Language: French
- Publisher: Éditions Albin Michel
- Publication date: November 2005
- Publication place: France
- Pages: 352
- ISBN: 9782226168245

En canot sur les chemins d'eau du Roi ("By Canoe on the King's Waterways") is a 2005 travel book by the French writer Jean Raspail. It retells the North American voyage the author made by canoe in 1949, following the route of the 17th-century missionary Father Marquette.

The book received the Prix littéraire de l'armée de terre - Erwan Bergot and the Prix du Salon nautique – Le Point.

== Synopsis ==
In 1949, Jean Raspail traveled in North America with his friends Philippe Andrieu, Jacques Boucharlat and Yves Kerbendeau, taking on the name Équipe Marquette ("Team Marquette"). They travel by canoe in the footsteps of Father Marquette, a Jesuit missionary who explored the Mississippi River in 1673. The voyage goes from Trois-Rivières in Quebec to New Orleans in Louisiana.

From the mouth of the Saint Lawrence River to that of the Mississippi, they pass by the Ottawa River and the Great Lakes. They travel through the area which used to be known as New France, which it is frequently referred to as throughout the book.
