= Sire (novel) =

Book by Jean Raspail

- First edition
- Author: Jean Raspail
- Language: French
- Publisher: Éditions de Fallois
- Publication date: 1991
- Pages: 279
- ISBN: 9782877061308

Sire is a 1991 novel by the French writer Jean Raspail. It tells the story of how monarchy returns to France as the 18-year-old Philippe Pharamond de Bourbon ascends the throne in 1999. The novel received the Grand prix du roman de la Ville de Paris and the Alfred de Vigny Prize.
