= Jean Miot =

French journalist and media executive

- Born: 30 July 1939; Châteauroux, Indre, France
- Died: 18 April 2017 (aged 77); Saint-Denis-de-Jouhet, Indre, France
- Occupations: Journalist, editor

Jean Miot (French: [ʒɑ̃ mjo]; 30 July 1939 – 18 April 2017) was a French journalist and media executive. He was the associate director of Le Figaro, France's conservative newspaper of record, from 1980 to 1993, and the chairman of its advisory committee from 1993 to 1996. He was the CEO of Agence France-Presse from 1996 to 1999.

== Early life ==
Jean Miot was born on 30 July 1939 in Châteauroux, Berry, France. His father was a piano tuner.

== Career ==
Miot began his career at Centre Presse, a local newspaper in Poitiers in 1964. He was a journalist for France-Antilles in 1968–1970. Between 1974 and 1980, he was the editor-in-chief of France-Antilles, Paris Normandie, Le Berry Républicain, Nord Matin, and Nord éclair.

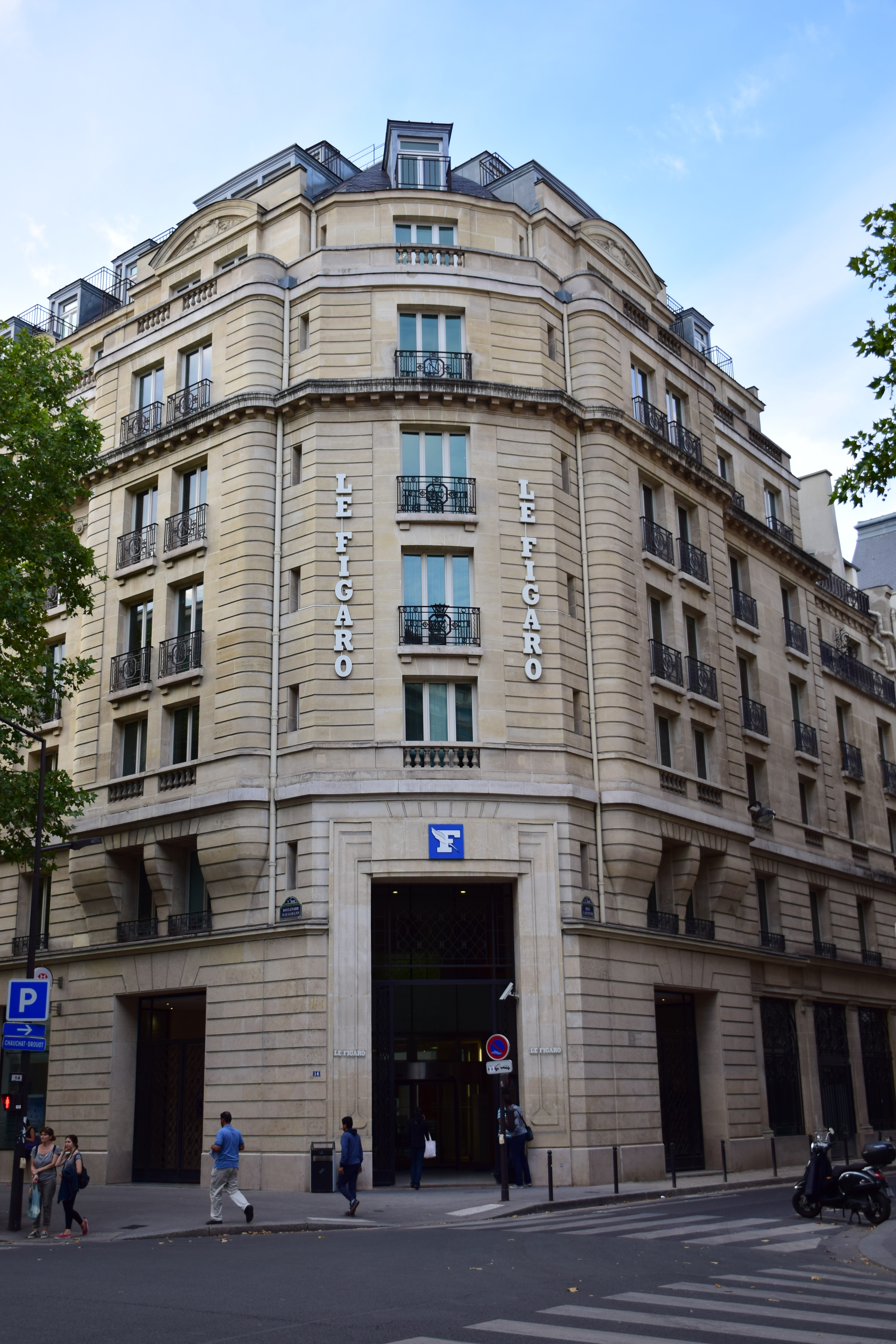
The headquarters of Le Figaro in Paris.

Miot was the associate director of Le Figaro from 1980 to 1993, and the chairman of its advisory committee of Le Figaro from 1993 to 1996. He was also the president of the National Federation of French Press from 1993 to 1996, and the chief executive officer of Agence France-Presse from 1996 to 1999.

Miot was a knight of the Legion of Honour and an officer of the Étoile Civique. He was also a knight of the Confrérie des Chevaliers du Sacavin and a member of the Confrérie des maitres-pipiers. Additionally, he was a commander of the Senegalese National Order of the Lion.

== Death ==
Miot died of a heart attack on 18 April 2017. He was 77.

== Works ==
- Miot, Jean (2009). La passion de la presse : de "La Gazette" de Renaudot au journal en ligne. Monaco: Éditions du Rocher. ISBN 9782268067438. OCLC 949126011.
