= National Order of the Lion =

Order of Senegal

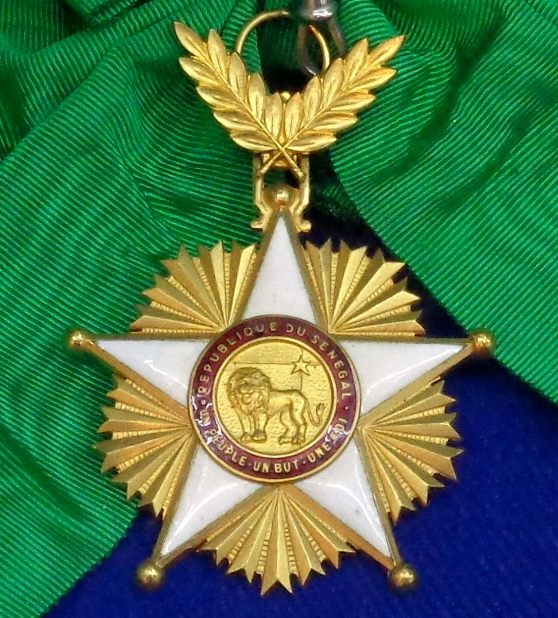
- Badge of the Grand Cross

Awarded by Senegal
- Type: State
- Established: 22 October 1960; 65 years ago
- Motto: French: "Un Peuple, Un But, Une Foi" ("One People, One Goal, One Faith")
- Status: Active
- Grand Master: Bassirou Diomaye Faye
- Classes: Grand Cross; Grand Officer; Commander; Officer; Knight

Precedence
- Next (higher): None
- Next (lower): Order of Merit
- Ribbon

The National Order of the Lion (French: Ordre national du Lion du Sénégal) is the highest order of Senegal.

The order was instituted by Law 60-36 of 22 October 1960 and was awarded to emperor Haile Selassie I as The Grand Cross of The National Order of the Lion of Judah, later modified by Law 62-416 of 11 July 1962, and by Law 64-06 of 24 January 1964. It is awarded for distinguished contributions, both civil and military. The order is one of two national orders of Senegal, the other one being the Order of Merit. Because the National Order of the Lion is awarded only sparingly to keep it in high esteem, the other order was established to recognize contributions that would otherwise be neglected.

The President of Senegal is the Grand Master of the order and chairs the Council of the Order composed of ten people. The Grand Chancellery of the order is under the Protocol Division of the Cabinet of Senegal. The Grand Chancellor is counter admiral Ousmane Ibrahima Sall. The insignia, manufactured by Arthus-Bertrand in Paris, bear the words "République du Sénégal ("Republic of Senegal") and the Senegalese national motto in French: "Un Peuple, Un But, Une Foi" ("One People, One Goal, One Faith"). The ribbon is green. The start of the order is featured in the coat of arms of Senegal.

== Ranks ==
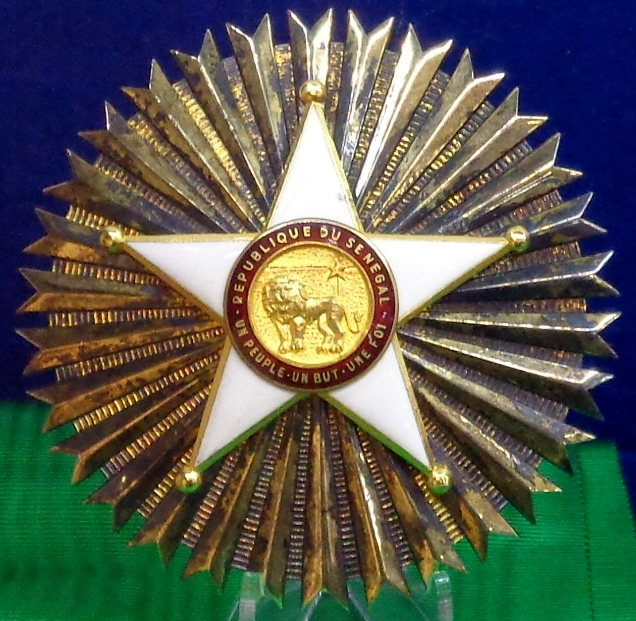
Star of the Grand Cross

The order has the following five classes: Grand Cross (grand-croix), Grand Officer (grand officier), Commander (commandeur), Officer (officier), and Knight (chevalier). Membership in the order is limited to 25 Grand Crosses, 100 Grand Officers, 200 Commanders, 1,000 Officers, and 5,000 Knights, not including foreign members.

Ribbon bars
Grand Cross	Grand Officer	Commander	Officer	Knight

== Recipients ==
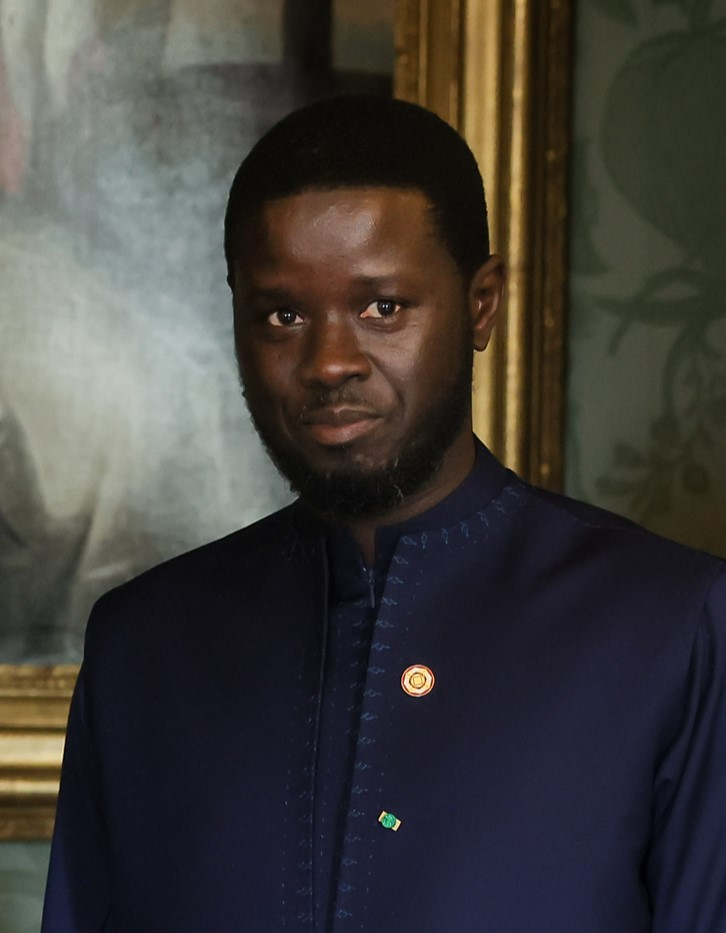
President of Senegal Bassirou Diomaye Faye, the Grand Master of the order

- Grand Crosses
  - Haile Selassie I
  - Akihito
  - Albert II, Prince of Monaco
  - Emmanuel Macron
  - Hamad bin Khalifa Al Thani
  - Henri, Grand Duke of Luxembourg
  - Jean-Bédel Bokassa
  - Juan Carlos I
  - Kim Jong-il
  - Macky Sall
  - Pieter van Vollenhoven
  - Princess Margriet of the Netherlands
  - Recep Tayyip Erdoğan
  - Tarja Halonen
  - Xi Jinping
- Grand Officers
  - Aga Khan IV
  - Juliette Bonkoungou
  - Salim Ahmed Salim
  - Édouard Mendy
  - Sadio Mané
  - Ismaïla Sarr
  - Colin Powell
- Commanders
  - Julius E. Coles
  - Jean-Philippe Douin
  - Pierre Joxe
  - Jacques Paul Klein
  - Jacques Lanxade
  - François Lecointre
  - Frédéric Luz
  - Jean Miot
  - Ndioro Ndiaye
  - Benoît Puga
  - Jean-Christophe Rufin
  - Torild Skard
  - Pierre de Villiers
  - Didier Raoult
- Knights
  - Germaine Acogny
  - Mbaye Diagne
  - Esther Kamatari
  - Ahmadou Lamine Ndiaye
  - Aminata Sow Fall
  - Papa Abdoulaye Seck

== See also ==
- Orders, decorations, and medals of Senegal
