= Achille Laviarde =

Pretender to the Kingdom of Araucanía and Patagonia

- Pretender
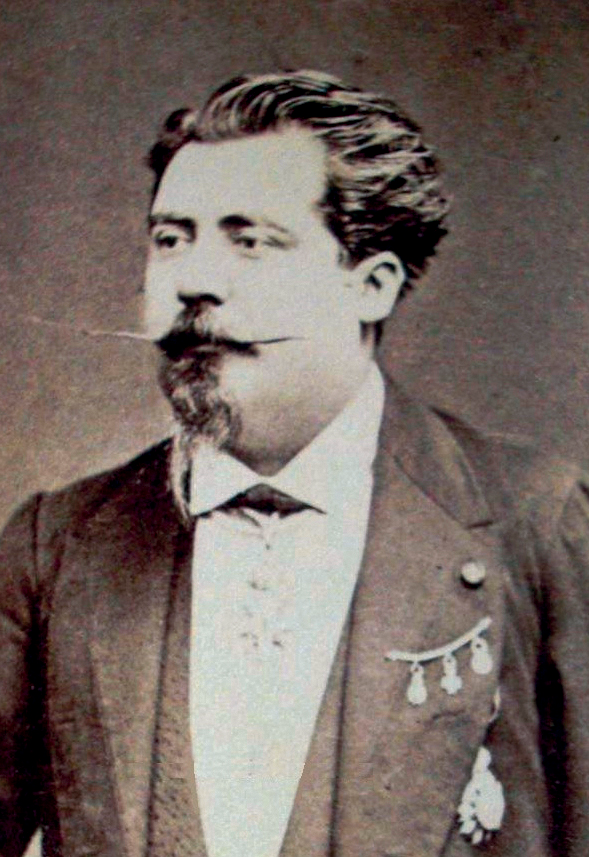
- Born: 7 November 1841; Paris, France
- Died: 16 March 1902 (aged 60)
- Regnal name claimed: 26 March 1882 - 6 March 1902
- Throne(s) claimed: Kingdom of Araucanía and Patagonia
- Pretend from: 1882–1902
- Spouse: Maria Elisa Octavia Guery
- Predecessor: Orelie-Antoine de Tounens
- Successor: Antoine-Hippolyte Cros

Gustave-Achille Laviarde (November 17, 1841 – March 16, 1902) was, from 1882 to his death, pretender to the Kingdom of Araucanía and Patagonia under the name of "Achille I king of Araucanie".

== Personal ==
Achille Laviarde was born to Bertrand Xavier Laviarde (1808–1867) and Marie Anne Rosalie Colmart (1812–1888) in Reims, France. On May 20, 1876, he married Marie Élisa Octavie Guéry (1852–1893) in London, England. The couple had no children.

Achille Laviarde was an active Bonapartiste, calling for the restoration of the French monarchy under the rule of a descendant of Napoleon Bonaparte. He was implicated in the "Affaire du Comité Rémois" which was investigated by the French Parliament in 1875.

He died in Paris, France, on March 16, 1902.

== Pretender to the throne of Araucanía and Patagonia ==
In 1882, three and a half years after the death on September 17, 1878 of Orelie-Antoine de Tounens, Achille Laviarde invoked a will of this one in his favor to proclaim himself pretender to the throne of Araucanía and Patagonia under the name Achille I. On March 26, 1882, he asked the nephew of Antoine de Tounens to give up the throne of Araucanía, invoking the last wishes of Antoine de Tounens.

Previously, on August 28, 1873 the Criminal Court of Paris ruled that Antoine de Tounens, first king of Araucanía and Patagonia did not justify his status of sovereign.

The pretenders to the throne of Araucanía and Patagonia are called monarchs and sovereigns of fantasy, "having only fanciful claims to a kingdom without legal existence and having no international recognition".

== Bibliography ==
- Bruno Fuligni, L'Etat c'est moi: histoire des monarchies privées, principautés de fantaisie et autres républiques pirates, Paris 1997.
- Simon de Schryver, Le Royaume d’Araucanie-Patagonie, Antoingt, 1887.
- Philippe Boiry aka "Philippe prince d´Araucanie", Histoire du Royaume d´Araucanie (1860–1979), une dynastie de princes français en Amérique Latine. S.F.A., Paris 1979, 468 p.
