= Kingdom of Araucanía and Patagonia =

Self proclaimed unrecognized state

The Kingdom of Araucanía and Patagonia (Spanish: Reino de la Araucanía y de la Patagonia; French: Royaume d'Araucanie et de Patagonie), sometimes referred to as Kingdom of New France (French: Royaume de Nouvelle-France), was a supposed kingdom declared by two ordinances on November 17, 1860 and November 20, 1860 from Antoine de Tounens, a French lawyer and adventurer, who claimed that the regions of Araucanía and eastern Patagonia did not depend on any other states. Tounens had the support of some Mapuche lonkos around a small area in Araucanía, who thought they could help maintain independence from the Chilean and Argentine governments.

Arrested on January 5, 1862 by the Chilean authorities, Antoine de Tounens was imprisoned and declared insane on September 2, 1862 by the court of Santiago and expelled to France on October 28, 1862. He later tried three times to return to Araucanía to reclaim his kingdom, but was each time captured and deported back to France by the Chilean State. After his 3rd and final attempt he died of the ill health conditions caused during his lengthy captivity in Chilean prison.

== History ==
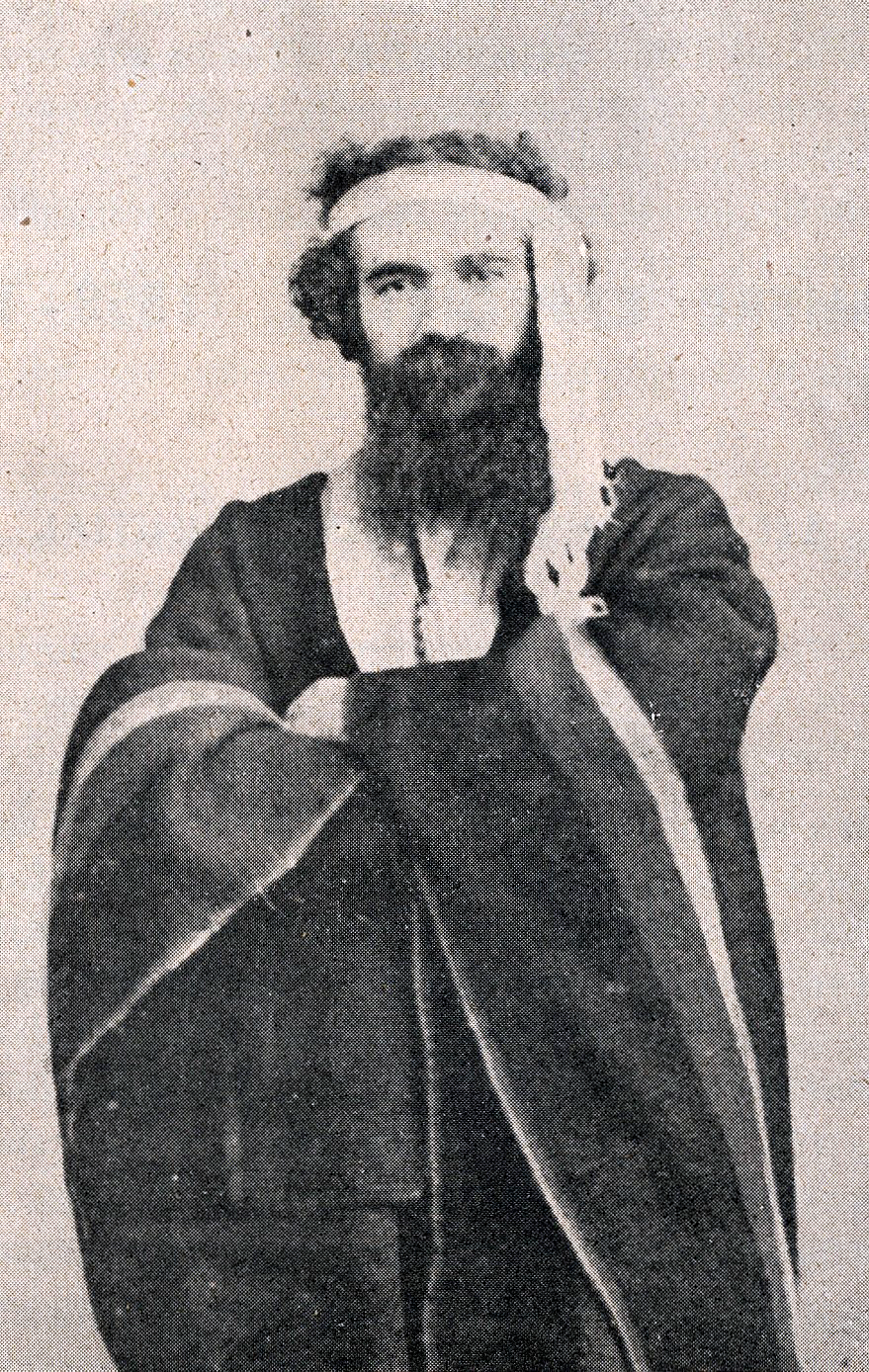
Orélie-Antoine de Tounens, Self-proclaimed 'King of Araucanía and Patagonia'.

In 1858, Antoine de Tounens, a former lawyer in Périgueux, France, who had read the book La Araucana by Alonso de Ercilla, decided to go to Araucanía, inspired to become its king after reading the book. He landed at the port of Coquimbo in Chile and met some loncos (Mapuche tribal leaders) after arriving South to the Biobío. He promised them some guns and the help of France to maintain their independence from Chile. The Indians he'd met elected him Great Toqui, Supreme Chieftain of the Mapuches, possibly in the belief that their cause might be better served with a European acting on their behalf.

On November 17, 1860, and November 20, 1860, the self-proclaimed sovereign proclaimed via two decrees that the regions of Araucanía and eastern Patagonia did not need to depend on any other states and that the Kingdom of Araucanía is founded with himself as monarch under the name King Orélie-Antoine I. He declared Perquenco capital of his kingdom, created a flag, and had coins minted for the nation under the name of Nouvelle France.

He writes in his Memoirs in 1863 "I took the title of king, by an ordinance of November 17, 1860, which established the bases of the hereditary constitutional government founded by me [...] On November 17, I returned to Araucanía to be publicly recognized as king, which took place on December 25, 26, 27 and 30. Weren't we, the Araucanians, free to bestow power on me, and I to accept it?"

The supposed founding of the Kingdom of Araucanía and Patagonia led to the Occupation of Araucanía by Chilean forces. Chilean president José Joaquín Pérez authorized Cornelio Saavedra Rodríguez, commander of the Chilean troops, to arrest Antoine de Tounens on January 5, 1862. Tounens was then imprisoned and declared insane on September 2, 1862, by the court of Santiago and expelled to France on October 28, 1862.

=== Attempts to return and fears of French intervention ===
In a 1870 meeting of Saavedra with Mapuche lonkos at Toltén, Mapuche chiefs revealed to Saavedra that Antoine de Tounens was once again at Araucanía. Upon hearing that his presence in Araucanía had been revealed Orélie-Antoine de Tounens fled to Argentina, having however promised Quilapán to obtain arms. There are some reports that a shipment of arms seized by Argentine authorities at Buenos Aires in 1871 had been ordered by Orélie-Antoine de Tounens. A French warship, d'Entrecasteaux, that anchored in 1870 at Corral, drew suspicions from Saavedra of some sort of French interference. Accordingly there may have been substance to these fears as information was given to Abdón Cifuentes in 1870 that an intervention in favour of the Kingdom of Araucanía and Patagonia against Chile was discussed in Napoleon III's Conseil d'Êtat.

On August 28, 1873, the Criminal Court of Paris ruled that Antoine de Tounens, first "king of Araucanía and Patagonia", did not justify his claim to the status of sovereignty. He died in poverty on September 17, 1878, in Tourtoirac, France, after years of fruitlessly struggling to regain his kingdom.

=== After de Tounens (1873–present) ===
Historians Simon Collier and William F. Sater describe the Kingdom of Araucanía as a "curious and semi-comic episode". According to travel writer Bruce Chatwin, the later history of the "kingdom" belongs rather to "the obsessions of bourgeois France than to the politics of South America." A French champagne salesman, Gustave Laviarde, impressed by the story, decided to assume the vacant throne as Aquiles I. He was appointed heir to the throne by Orélie-Antoine. The pretenders to the throne of Araucanía and Patagonia have been called monarchs and sovereigns of fantasy, "having only fanciful claims to a kingdom without legal existence and having no international recognition". Therefore the "throne of Araucanía" is sometimes the subject of disputes between "pretenders", some journalists wrote : "The memory of the French adventurer Orélie-Antoine, self-proclaimed king in 1860, and the defense of the rights of the Mapuches guide the action of this strange symbolic monarchy" and "The intensification of the Mapuche conflict in recent years has given a new purpose to the Kingdom of Araucanía and Patagonia, long considered an absurdity by French society."

Mapuche writer Pedro Cayuqueo considers the kingdom a lost opportunity and speculates that, in a French-ruled Araucanía, the Mapuche would have rights similar to that of the Kanak people, who were given the possibility of independence from France in a 2018 referendum.

== Pretenders to the throne after Antoine de Tounens ==
Antoine de Tounens died in Tourtoirac in 1878, having named a successor, and the line of pretenders continued in France. Philippe Boiry took the title in 1951, styling himself "prince" rather than king. After Boiry's death in 2014 he was succeeded by Jean-Michel Parasiliti di Para, and on Parasiliti's death in late 2017 Frédéric Luz was elected to the title, although a rival pretender also existed.

Sovereign

No.	image	title	Given name (birth- Death)	Reign	Ref.	Other information
1		Orélie-Antoine I	Orélie-Antoine de Tounens (1825–1878)	1860–1862	Founded the claimed kingdom by ordinance in November 1860. Arrested by Chilean authorities in 1862 and expelled to France; made three further attempts to return before his death in Tourtoirac in 1878.	

List of pretenders to the Throne and Heads of the Royal House of Araucanía and Patagonia

No.	Image	Title	Given name (Birth–Death)	Reign	Ref.	Other information
1		Orélie-Antoine I	Orélie-Antoine de Tounens (1825–1878)	1862–1878		
2		Achille I	Gustave-Achille Laviarde (1841–1902)	1878–1902		Secretary of the preceding. Titled Futha Apo Toki (High war Chief of the Mapuche people) Prince of Aucas and Duke of Kialeon by Antoine de Tounens in March 1882 as successor to King Antoine I.
3		Antoine II	Antoine-Hippolyte Cros (1833–1903)	1902–1903		Titled Duke of Niacalel and appointed Keeper of the Seals of the Kingdom of Araucanía by Achille Laviarde
4		Laure Therese I	Laure-Therese Cros (1856–1916)	1903–1916		Daughter of Antoine II
5		Antoine III	Jacques Antoine Bernard (1888–1952)	1916–1952		abdicated in favour of prince Philippe I
6		Prince Philippe	Philippe Paul Alexandre Henri Boiry (1927–2014)	1952–2014		
–		Regent Philippe de Lavalette	Philippe de Lavalette	2014-2014		Regent of the kingdom until the election of the successor by the Council of Regency.
7		Antoine IV	Jean-Michel Parasiliti di Para (1942–2017)	2014–2017		
–		Regent Sheila Rani	Sheila Rani	2017–2018		Regent of the kingdom until the election of the successor by the Council of Regency.
8		Frédéric I	Frédéric Rodriguez-Luz (1964–)	2018–2025		

== In popular culture ==
1981 novel Moi, Antoine de Tounens, roi de Patagonie by Jean Raspail recounts the efforts of Antoine de Tounens to establish the kingdom. The book won the 1981 Grand Prix du roman de l'Académie française.

The 2017 film Rey is based on the incident.

== See also ==
- Araucanization
- Occupation of Araucanía
- Taiping Heavenly Kingdom
