= Avoué =

Former function at the courts in France and Belgium

In France and Belgium, an avoué (French: [avue]) was formerly a jurist and a ministerial officer charged with performing the preparation (French: postulation) of cases in front of courts. Their functions were roughly equivalent to that of solicitors in common law systems, but only in the context of litigation. The office was abolished in Belgium in 1970 and in France in 2012.

Traditionally in France, there existed a distinction between the oral pleading of a case, which was the function of the avocat, and the preparation of a case, which was considered a ministerial function. Avoués were charged with the latter. Their tasks included the drafting of the statement of claim and of other documents, the distribution of the judgment, and other matters of procedure.

Avoués were ministerial officers, appointed by the Garde des sceaux in France, and were remunerated according to an official fee schedule. There existed two types of avoués: avoués de première instance and the avoués d'appel. The former were abolished in 1971. The latter, who appeared in cases before the Appeals court in France, were abolished in 2012, when their profession was subsumed with that of the avocat.
