= Chourgnac =

- Commune
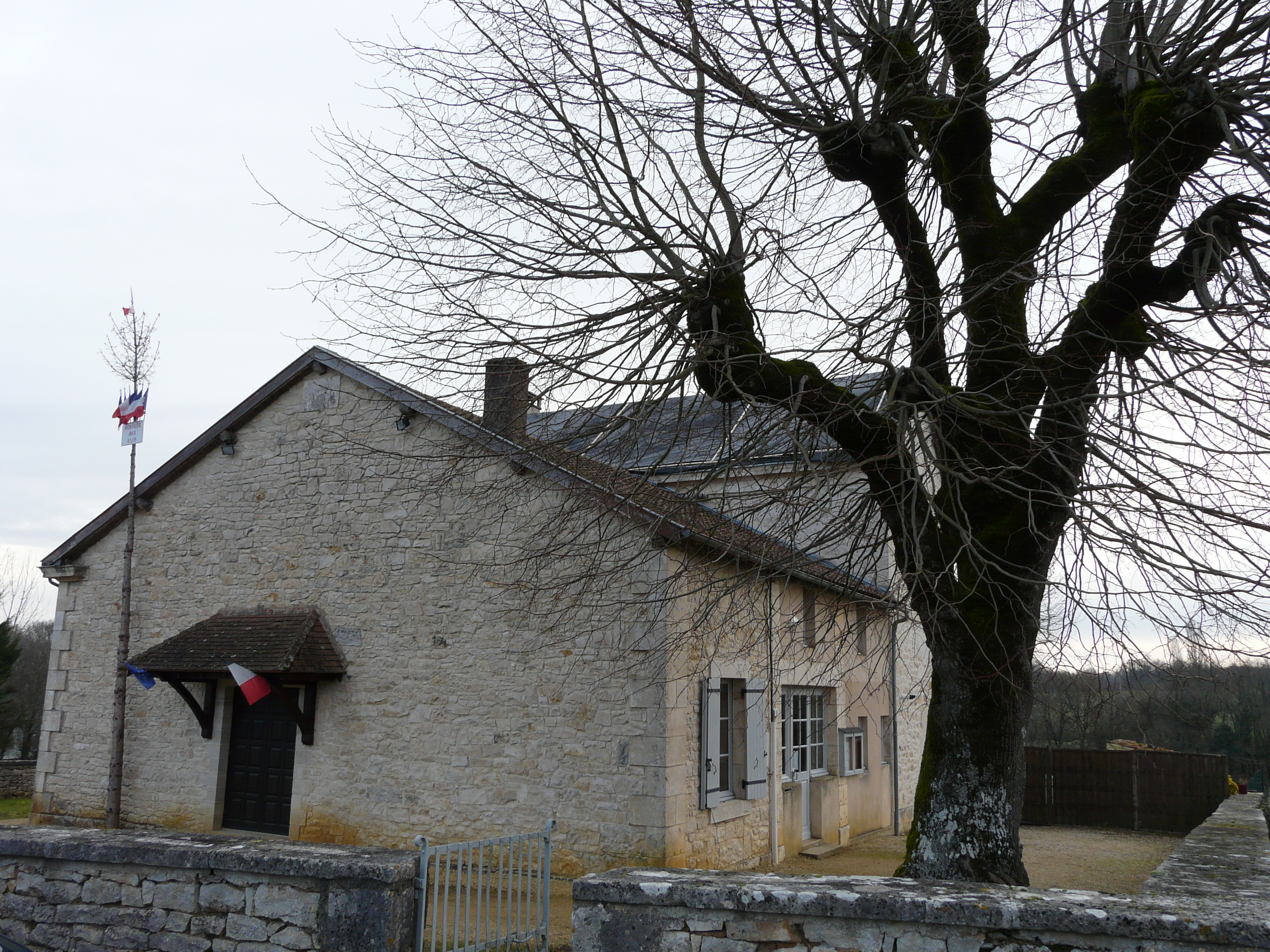
- The town hall in Chourgnac
- Location of Chourgnac
- Location within France Location within Nouvelle-Aquitaine
- Coordinates: 45°14′14″N 1°03′37″E
- Country: France
- Region: Nouvelle-Aquitaine
- Department: Dordogne
- Arrondissement: Sarlat-la-Canéda
- Canton: Haut-Périgord Noir

Government
  - Mayor (2020–2026): Patricia Flageat
- Area^{1}: 6.96 km^{2} (2.69 sq mi)
- Elevation: 211 m (692 ft)
- Highest elevation: 260 m (850 ft)
- Lowest elevation: 149 m (489 ft)
- Population (2023): 69
  - Density: 9.9/km^{2} (26/sq mi)
- Time zone: UTC+01:00 (CET)
  - Summer (DST): UTC+02:00 (CEST)
- INSEE/Postal code: 24121 /24640
- ^{1} French Land Register data, which excludes lakes, ponds, glaciers > 1 km^{2} (0.386 sq mi or 247 acres) and river estuaries.

Chourgnac (French pronunciation: [ʃuʁɲak]; Occitan: Chornhac) is a commune in the Dordogne department in Nouvelle-Aquitaine in southwestern France.

== Population ==
Historical population
Year	Pop.	±% p.a.
1968	94	—
1975	71	−3.93%
1982	72	+0.20%
1990	71	−0.17%
1999	56	−2.60%
2007	71	+3.01%
2012	73	+0.56%
2017	60	−3.85%
2023	69	+2.36%
Source: INSEE

== Notable people ==
- Orelie-Antoine de Tounens, “King of Araucania and Patagonia”

== See also ==
- Communes of the Dordogne department
