= Who Will Remember the People... =

1986 novel by Jean Raspail

- First edition
- Author: Jean Raspail
- Original title: Qui se souvient des hommes...
- Translator: Jeremy Leggatt
- Language: French
- Publisher: Éditions Robert Laffont
- Publication date: 1 September 1986
- Publication place: France
- English publication date: 1988
- Pages: 284
- ISBN: 2-221-04559-9

Who Will Remember the People... (French: Qui se souvient des hommes...) is a 1986 novel by the French writer Jean Raspail. It tells the history of the Alacalufe people, a largely extinct South American tribe, throughout the centuries. The two main characters reappear in each generation. The native name of the Alacufs is "Kaweskar", which means "the people". Raspail had met members of the tribe in the early 1950s which had made an impression that stayed with him.

The book was published in English in 1988, translated by Jeremy Leggatt. It received the Chateaubriand Prize and the Inter Book Prize.

== Reception ==
Elizabeth Marshall Thomas reviewed the book for The New York Times, and wrote that Raspail "seems rather critical of the Kaweskar, calling them seafarers who 'never even invented the sail,' having them perform unlikely, pointless acts (impotently throwing a stone in imitation of a cannonball, for example) and describing their food from a European viewpoint, which certainly makes it seem disgusting." Marshall Thomas was positive about the author's negative portrayal of Europeans, especially that of Charles Darwin: "Mr. Raspail's portrait of him deserves applause". The critic continued: "The victims and their oppressors seem equally squalid, ignorant, pathetic, as the two groups inexorably re-enact the age-old pageant known as Man's Inhumanity to Man". Marshall Thomas questioned Raspail's decision to portray an already extinct nation, rather than one at the risk of vanishment: "Yes, the last Kaweskar has gone to heaven, and we're sorry. But what about those like him who remain here below? They want to live. They too are 'The People.' Remember them?" Jack Schmitt wrote in Los Angeles Times: "In two recent works, Bruce Chatwin (The Songlines) and Mario Vargas Llosa (El Hablador (The Speaker) ) convincingly draw the reader into the soul-life, the Earth-bound myths and legends of the Australian Bushmen and the Peruvian Machiguengas, respectively. Raspail is far less successful in a parallel attempt with the Alacalufs, and the fault is not in Jeremy Leggatt's translation, which is excellent. Despite that limitation, Raspail's story, inscribed in the dialogue of cultures so characteristic of our age, is a fine version in historical fiction of a true story loud with ethical reverberations."
