= Jacques Antoine Bernard =

French writer and editor

Jacques-Antoine Bernard
- Pretender
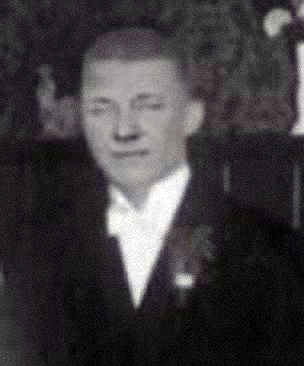
- Born: 4 November 1888; Paris, France
- Died: 26 October 1952 (aged 63); Paris, France
- Title(s): Known as "King Antoine III of Araucania"
- Throne(s) claimed: Kingdom of Araucanía and Patagonia
- Pretend from: 1916-1951
- Spouse: Ingrid Moller
- Predecessor: Laure-Therese Cros
- Successor: Philippe Boiry

Jacques Antoine Bernard (November 4, 1888 – October 26, 1952), was a French writer and editor of the Mercure de France, an important literary journal. He was also a pretender to the throne of the Kingdom of Araucanía and Patagonia.

== Personal ==
Born Jacques Alexandre Antoine Bernard, on April 11, 1888 in Paris, France, he was the son of Laure-Theresa Cros-Bernard, fourth sovereign of the Kingdom of Araucania and Patagonia. His father was Louis Marie Bernard. He was married three times: in 1907 to Andree Emilie Coquelin, in 1915 to Suzanne Anna Eugenie Legat and in 1931 to Ingrid Moller. His union with Ingrid Moller produced one daughter, N. N. Bernard. Jacques Antoine Bernard died in Paris on October 26, 1952.

== Professional ==
Bernard was a writer and editor working for Mercure de France. In 1938, he was named editor, a position he held until 1945. After the war, Bernard was convicted of collaboration with the Nazis.

== Pretender to the throne of Araucanía and Patagonia ==
On August 28, 1873 the Criminal Court of Paris ruled that Antoine de Tounens, first "king of Araucania and Patagonia" did not justify his status of sovereign.

Since the death of Antoine de Tounens, some French citizens without familial relations declared themselves to be pretenders to the throne of Araucania and Patagonia. Whether the Mapuche themselves accept this, or are even aware of it, is unclear.

The pretenders to the throne of Araucania and Patagonia are called monarchs and sovereigns of fantasy, "having only fanciful claims to a kingdom without legal existence and having no international recognition".

Jacques Antoine Bernard became pretender to the throne of Araucania upon the death of his mother, Laure-Therese Cros. He did very little work for the kingdom.

In 1951 Philippe Boiry claimed that Jacques Antoine Bernard abdicated in his favour.
