= Jean Raspail =

French author, traveler and explorer (1925–2020)

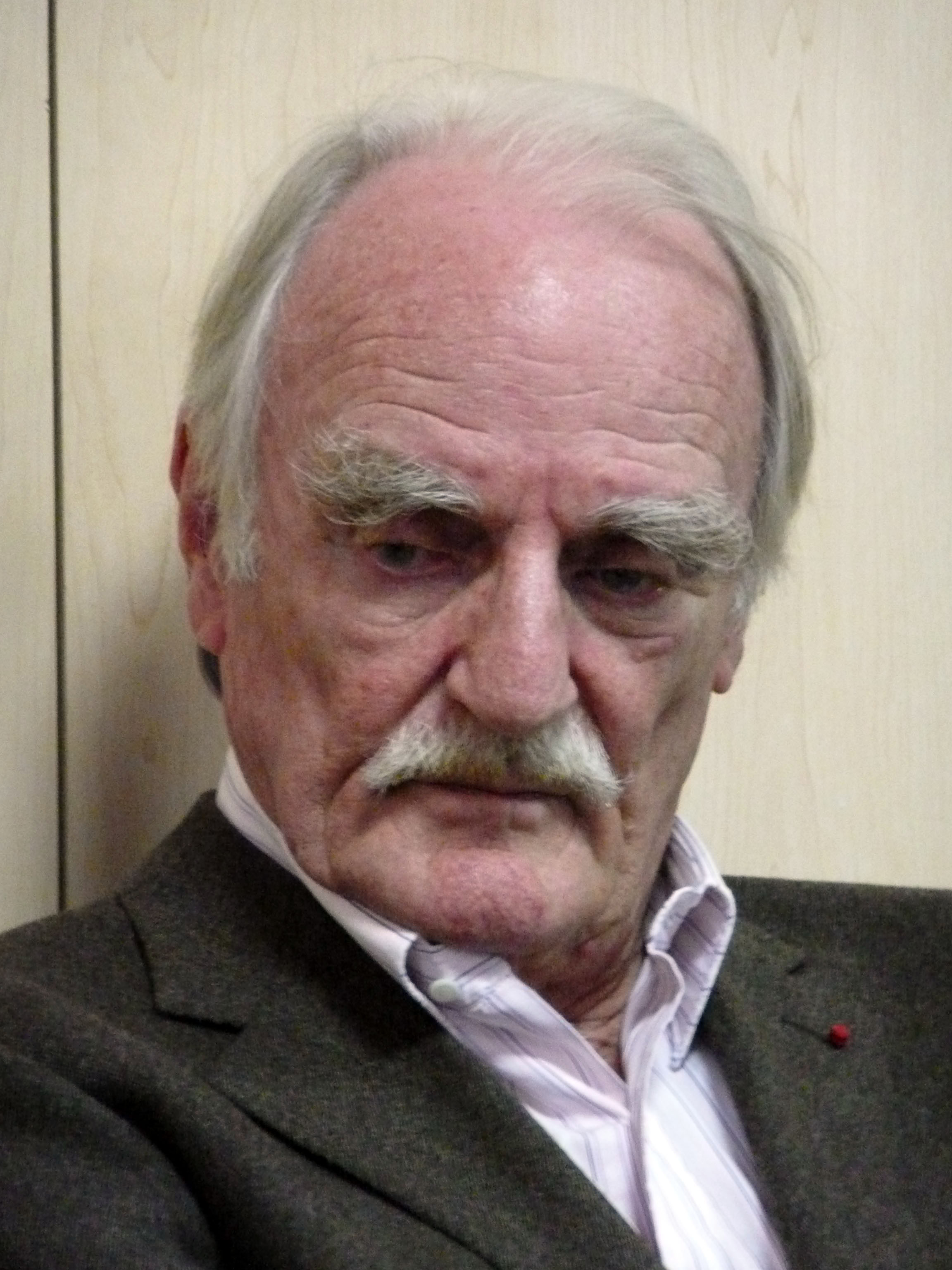
- Raspail in 2010
- Born: Jean Paul Raspail; 5 July 1925; Chemillé-sur-Dême, Indre-et-Loire, France
- Died: 13 June 2020 (aged 94); Paris, France
- Resting place: Montparnasse Cemetery, Paris
- Occupations: Explorer, novelist, travel writer
- Writing career
- Notable works: The Camp of the Saints; Moi, Antoine de Tounens, roi de Patagonie
- Notable awards: Grand Prix du roman de l'Académie française (1981); Prix Maison de la Presse (1995); Grand prix de littérature de l'Académie française (2003); Grande Médaille d'Or des Explorations (2007); Prix Combourg-Chateaubriand (2008)

Jean Paul Raspail (French: [ʒɑ̃ ʁaspaj]; 5 July 1925 – 13 June 2020) was a French explorer, novelist and travel writer. He was a recipient of the prestigious French literary awards Grand Prix du Roman and Grand Prix de littérature by the Académie Française. The French government honoured him in 2003 by appointing him to the Legion of Honour, with the grade of Officer. Although the majority of his books are travelogues or novels about historical figures, exploration and indigenous peoples, internationally, he is best known for his controversial 1973 novel The Camp of the Saints, which is about mass third-world immigration to Europe.

== Life and career ==
Born on 5 July 1925 in Chemillé-sur-Dême, Indre-et-Loire, Raspail was the son of factory manager Octave Raspail and Marguerite Chaix. He attended private Catholic school at Saint-Jean de Passy in Paris, the Institution Sainte-Marie d'Antony and the École des Roches in Verneuil-sur-Avre.

During the first twenty years of his career Raspail traveled the world. He led a Tierra del Fuego–Alaska car trek in 1950–52 and, in 1954, a French research expedition to the land of the Incas. In 1981, his novel Moi, Antoine de Tounens, roi de Patagonie (I, Antoine of Tounens, King of Patagonia) won the Grand Prix du Roman (award for a novel) of the Académie Française.

His traditional Catholicism serves as an inspiration for many of his works, in which the utopias of communism and liberalism are shown to fail, and a Catholic monarchy is restored. In his 1990 novel Sire a French king is crowned in Reims in February 1999, the 18-year-old Philippe Pharamond de Bourbon, a direct descendant of the last French kings.

In his best known work, The Camp of the Saints (1973), Raspail depicts the collapse of Western civilization from an overwhelming "tidal wave" of Third World immigration. The "hordes" of the world rise and, in the words of playwright Ian Allen, "destroy the white race." The book has been translated into English, German, Spanish, Italian, Afrikaans, Czech, Dutch, Polish, Hungarian and Portuguese, and as of 2006 it had sold over 500,000 copies. After The Camp of the Saints Raspail wrote other novels, including North, Sire, and The Fisher's Ring. Raspail reiterated these views in a co-written 1985 article ("Will France Still Be French in 2015?") for Le Figaro magazine, where he stated "the proportion of France's non-European immigrant population will grow to endanger the survival of traditional French culture, values and identity".

Raspail was a candidate for the French Academy in 2000, for which he received the most votes, yet did not obtain the majority required for election to the vacant seat of Jean Guitton.

For his article for Le Figaro on 17 June 2004, entitled "The Fatherland Betrayed by the Republic", in which he criticized the French immigration policy, the International League against Racism and Anti-Semitism sued Raspail on the grounds of "incitement to racial hatred". The court turned the action aside on 28 October.

In 1970, the Académie Française awarded Raspail its Jean Walter Prize for the whole of his work. In 2007 he was awarded the Grande Médaille d'Or des Explorations et Voyages de Découverte by the Société de géographie of France for the whole of his work.

== Personal life ==
Raspail lived in Neuilly-sur-Seine, a Parisian suburb. He died in the Henry-Dunant Hospital in Paris on 13 June 2020, aged 94. His funeral was held in the Church of Saint-Roch.

== Works ==
- Terre de feu – Alaska (Land of Fire – Alaska) (1952) – adventure writing
- Terres et Peuples Incas (Inca Lands and Peoples) (1955)
- Le Vent des Pins (1958), translated as Welcome Honorable Visitors: a novel by Jean Stewart (Putnam, 1960)
- Terres Saintes et Profanes (Lands Holy and Profane) (1960)
- Les Veuves de Santiago (The Widows of Santiago) (1962)
- Hong-Kong, Chine en sursis (Hong Kong, A Reprieve for China) (1963)
- Secouons le cocotier (Let's Shake the Coconut Tree) (1966) – travel writing
- Secouons le cocotier : 2, Punch Caraïbe (Let's Shake the Coconut Tree 2: Caribbean Punch) (1970) – travel writing
- Bienvenue Honorables Visiteurs (le Vent des pins) (Welcome Honorable Visitors) (1970) – novel
- Le Tam-Tam de Jonathan (Jonathan's Drum) (1971) – nouvelles
- L'Armada de la Dernière Chance (Last-Chance Armada) (1972)
- Le Camp des Saints (1973), translated as The Camp of the Saints by Norman Shapiro (Scribner, 1975; The Social Contract Press, 1995, ISBN 1-881780-07-4) – novel
- La Hache des Steppes (The Steppes Axe) (1974)
- Journal Peau Rouge (Red Skin Journal) (1975)
- Nuage Blanc et les Peaux-Rouges d'aujourd'hui (White Cloud and the Redskins of Today) (1975) – by Aliette and Jean Raspail
- Le Jeu du Roi (The King's Game) (1976) – novel
- Boulevard Raspail (Raspail Boulevard) (1977) – columns
- Les Peaux-rouges aujourd'hui (Redskins Today) (1978)
- Septentrion (North) (1979), translated as Septentrion (Sunny Lou Publishing, 2022, ISBN 978-1-95539-223-5) – novel
- Bleu caraïbe et citrons verts : mes derniers voyages aux Antilles (Caribbean Blue and Green Lemons: My Last Trips to the Antilles) (1980)
- Les Antilles, d'île en île (The Antilles, From Island to Island) (1980)
- Moi, Antoine de Tounens, roi de Patagonie (I, Antoine of Tounens, King of Patagonia) (1981) – novel
- Les Hussards : histoires exemplaires (The Hussars: Representative Stories) (1982)
- Les Yeux d'Irène (Irene's Eyes) (1984) – novel
- Le Président (The President) (1985) – novel
- Qui se souvient des hommes... (1986), translated as Who Will Remember the People...: A Novel. Translated by J. Leggatt (Mercury House, 1988, ISBN 0-916515-42-7) – novel. UK paperback published under alternative title The People (1988).
- L'Île bleue (1988), translated by J. Leggatt as Blue Island: A Novel (Mercury House, 1991, ISBN 0-916515-99-0)
- Pêcheurs de Lune (Moon Fishers) (1990)
- Sire (Sire) (1990) – novel
- Vive Venise (Long Live Venice) (1992) – by Aliette and Jean Raspail
- Sept cavaliers quittèrent la ville au crépuscule par la porte de l'Ouest qui n'était plus gardée (Seven Riders Left the City at Dusk through the Western Gate, Which Was No Longer Guarded) (1993) – novel (commonly called Sept cavaliers...)
- L'Anneau du pêcheur (The Ring of the Fisherman) (1995) – novel
- Hurrah Zara ! (Hooray Zara!) (1998) – novel
- Le Roi au-delà de la mer (The King Over the Water) (2000) – novel
- Adiós, Tierra del Fuego (Goodbye, Tierra del Fuego) (2001) – travel writing
- Le son des tambours sur la neige et autres nouvelles d'ailleurs (The Sound of Drums on Snow, and Other News from Elsewhere) (2002)
- Les Royaumes de Borée (The Kingdoms of Borée) (2003) – novel
- En canot sur les chemins d'eau du roi, une aventure en Amérique (2005) – travel writing
- La Miséricorde (2019) – novel

== Adaptations ==
- Le Roi de Patagonie (1990), TV mini-series directed by Georges Campana and Stéphane Kurc
- Le Jeu du roi (1991), TV film directed by Marc Evans
- L'Île bleue (2001), TV film directed by Nadine Trintignant
- Sept cavaliers (2008–2010), comic book in three volumes by Jacques Terpant
- Le Royaume de Borée (2011–2014), comic book in three volumes by Jacques Terpant
