= Orélie-Antoine de Tounens =

French adventurer who proclaimed himself king of Araucania and Patagonia

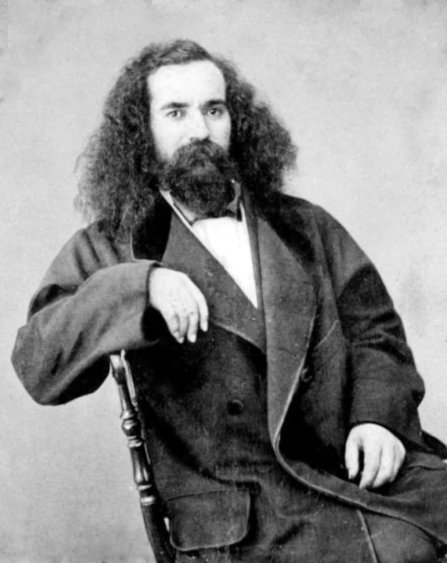

King of Araucania and Patagonia
- Reign: 17 November 1860 – 17 September 1878
- Predecessor: Position created
- Successor: Achille Laviarde
- Born: 12 May 1825; Chourgnac, France
- Died: 17 September 1878 (aged 53); Tourtoirac, France
- Father: Jean Tounens
- Mother: Catherine Jardon
- Religion: Roman Catholicism
- Occupation: Lawyer

Orélie-Antoine de Tounens (born Antoine Tounens) (12 May 1825 – 17 September 1878) was a French avoué and adventurer who proclaimed by two decrees on 17 and 20 November 1860 that Araucanía and Patagonia did not depend of any other states and that he himself was King of Araucanía and Patagonia. On 5 January 1862, he was arrested by the Chilean army and imprisoned. He was declared insane by the court of Santiago on 2 September 1862, and expelled to France on 28 October 1862. He tried three further times to go back to Araucanía to regain his "kingdom", but without success, and he died in poverty on 17 September 1878, in Tourtoirac, France.

== Biography ==
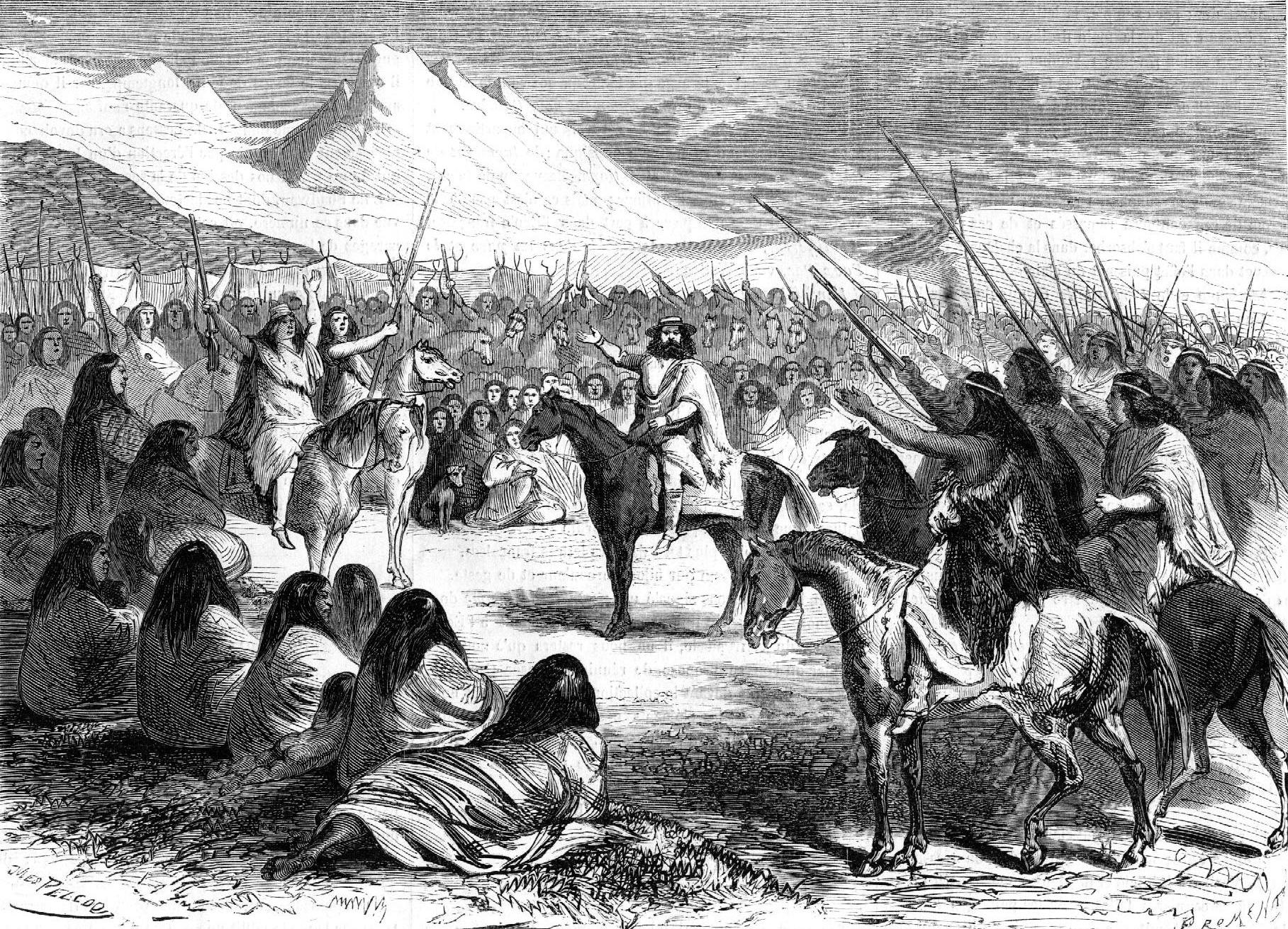
Antoine de Tounens with the Mapuche warriors

Antoine Tounens was born on 12 May 1825. His father was the French butcher Jean Tounens from La Chèze, while his mother, Katerina Zardon (Katerina Zartoudi) (Greek: Κατερίνα Ζαρτούδη), was a Greek seamstress from Patras, Greece.

In 1858, Antoine de Tounens, a former avoué in Périgueux (France) had read the book of Alonso de Ercilla, La Araucana, and decided to go to Araucania, inspired by the book to become the King of Araucania. He disembarked at the port of Coquimbo in Chile and spent two years in Valparaíso and Santiago, studying Spanish. Later he moved South to the Bio-Bio where he met some loncos (Mapuche tribal leaders). He promised them arms and the help of France to maintain their independence from Chile. They elected him Great Toqui, Supreme Chieftain of the Mapuches.

By two decrees on 17 November 1860 and 20 November 1860, he proclaimed himself king of Araucania and Patagonia under the name Orélie-Antoine I.

De Tounens wrote in his Memoirs in 1863 "I took the title of king, by an ordinance of 17 November 1860, which established the bases of the hereditary constitutional government founded by me [...] On 17 November I returned to Araucania to be publicly recognized as king, which took place on 25, 26, 27 and 30 December. Weren't we, the Araucanians, free to bestow power on me, and I to accept it?"

De Tounens sent copies of the constitution of his kingdom to Chilean newspapers and El Mercurio published a portion of it on 29 December 1860. Then he returned to Valparaíso to wait for the representatives of the Chilean government. They ignored him. He also attempted to involve the French government in his idea, but the French consul, after making some inquiries, came to the conclusion that de Tounens was insane. He returned to Araucanía where many Mapuche tribes were again preparing to fight the incursions of the Chilean Army during the occupation of Araucanía.

The supposed founding of the Kingdom of Araucanía and Patagonia led to the Occupation of Araucanía by Chilean forces. Chilean president José Joaquín Pérez authorized Cornelio Saavedra Rodríguez, commander of the Chilean troops, to invade Araucanía.

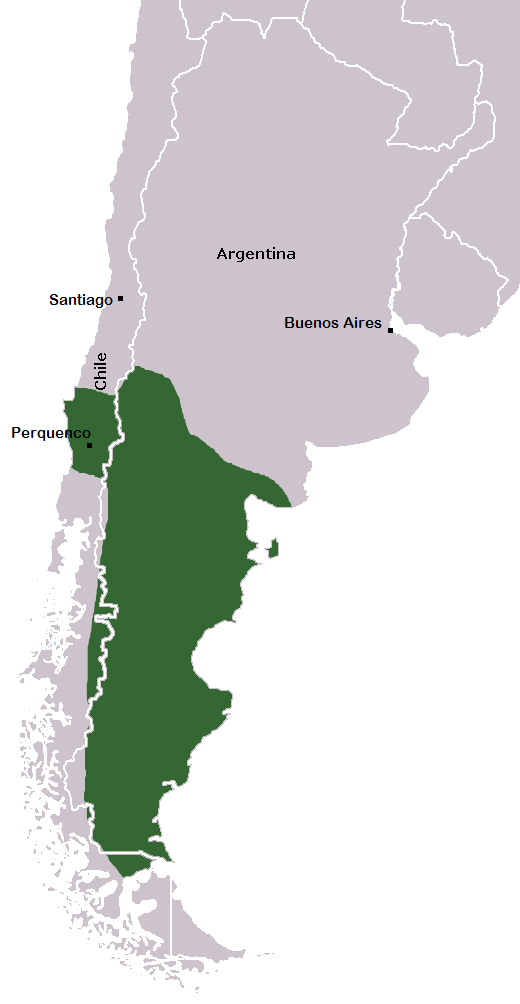
Territory claimed by Antoine de Tounens

Flag of the kingdom of Araucanía and Patagonia conceived by Antoine de Tounens

His servant, Juan Bautista Rosales, contacted Chilean authorities and Antoine de Tounens was captured on 5 January 1862 by the Chilean army, then imprisoned and declared insane on 2 September 1862 by the court of Santiago and expelled to France on 28 October 1862.

De Tounens published his memoirs in 1863. In 1869, he returned to Araucanía, via Buenos Aires. The Mapuche were surprised to see him because the Chileans had told them that they had executed him. De Tounens proceeded to reorganize his realm and again attracted the attention of the Chilean authorities. Colonel Cornelio Saavedra Rodríguez promised a reward for his head but the Mapuche decided to defend their unusual ally.

Without proper funds in 1871 he had to return to France, where he published a second set of his memoirs. He also founded an Araucanian newspaper La Corona de Acero ("The Steel Crown"). In 1872, he proclaimed that he was seeking a bride so that he might sire an heir; indeed, the next year, he wrote to tell his brother that he intended to marry a "mademoiselle de Percy", but there is no evidence that he ever did.

In 1874, he tried again to return to his kingdom, this time with some arms and ammunition he was able to gather with the feeble support of a few entrepreneurs in Europe. Because he was persona non grata in Chile, he traveled with a false passport. However, he was recognized as soon as he landed in Bahía Blanca (on the Argentine coast) in July 1874, and was summarily deported to France.

De Tounens tried to return again in 1876. However, local settlers robbed him on his way to Patagonia and handed him over to Chilean authorities. He also fell ill and had to go through an operation to survive. His health did not allow him to continue his journey and he had to return to France.

On 28 August 1873 the Criminal Court of Paris ruled that Antoine de Tounens, first king of Araucania and Patagonia did not justify his status of sovereign.

De Tounens died in poverty on 17 September 1878 in Tourtoirac, France.

De Tounens had no children but since his death in 1878, some French citizens without familial relations declared themselves to be pretenders to the throne of Araucania and Patagonia. Whether the Mapuche themselves accept this, or are even aware of it, is unclear.

The pretenders to the throne of Araucania and Patagonia are called monarchs and sovereigns of fantasy, "having only fanciful claims to a kingdom without legal existence and having no international recognition".

== See also ==
- Khalid Sheldrake, a British Muslim who was briefly King of Islamestan, a short-lived Uyghur state during the Warlord Era

== Bibliography ==
- Antoine de Tounens, Orllie-Antoine 1er, roi d'Araucanie et de Patagonie: son avénement au trône et sa captivité au Chili, relation écrit par lui-même, Paris 1863.,
- Roberto Hosne, Patagonia: History, Myths and Legends, Duggan-Webster, 2001, page 65.,
- Carlos Foresti Serrano, Eva Löfquist, Álvaro Foresti, María Clara Medina, La narrativa chilena desde la independencia hasta la Guerra del Pacífico, Editorial Andrés Bello, 2001, page 63.,
- Braun-Menéndez, Armando: El Reino de Araucanía y Patagonia. Editorial Francisco de Aguirre. 5a edición. Buenos Aires y Santiago de Chile, 1967. Primera edición: Emecé, Colección Buen Aire, Buenos Aires, 1945,
- Magne, Leo: L´extraordinaire aventure d´Antoine de Tounens, roi d´Araucanie-Patagonie. Editions France-Amérique latine, Paris 1950,
- Philippe Prince d´Araucanie: Histoire du Royaume d´Araucanie (1860–1979), une Dynastie de Princes Français en Amérique Latine. S.E.A., Paris 1979,
- Silva, Victor Domingo: El Rey de Araucanía. Empresa Editorial Zig-Zag. Santiago de Chile, 1936,
- Jean Raspail: Moi, Antoine de Tounens, roi de Patagonie, éditions Albin Michel, 1981 (Grand prix du roman de l'Académie française).

Preceded by New Creation	King of Araucania and Patagonia; 1860–1878	Succeeded by Achille I
