= Jasia Reichardt =

British art critic, curator, art gallery director, teacher and writer

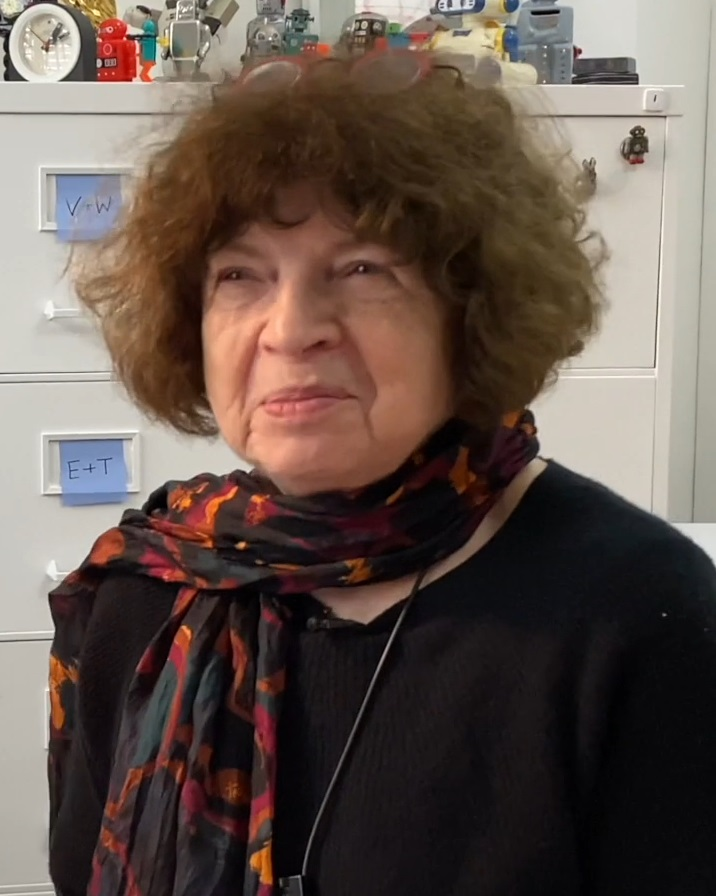
- Reichardt in 2022
- Born: Janina Chaykin; 13 November 1933 (age 92); Warsaw, Poland
- Citizenship: British
- Education: Dartington Hall School; Bristol Old Vic Theatre School
- Occupations: art critic, curator, teacher and writer
- Writing career
- Notable works: Cybernetic serendipity: the computer and the arts, director of the Themerson Archive

Jasia Reichardt (born Janina Chaykin; 13 November 1933) is a British art critic, curator, art gallery director, teacher and prolific writer, specialist in the emergence of computer art. In 1968 she was curator of the landmark Cybernetic Serendipity exhibition at London's Institute of Contemporary Arts. She is generally known for her work on experimental art. After the deaths of Franciszka and Stefan Themerson she catalogued their archive and looks after their legacy.

Her own self-description reads: Jasia Reichardt writes, lectures and organises events about subjects which deal with the relationship of art to other areas of human activity such as architecture, science, technology. She was assistant director of the ICA, director of the Whitechapel Art Gallery, and tutor at the AA. She has written books on art, computers, robots and the future.

== Childhood ==
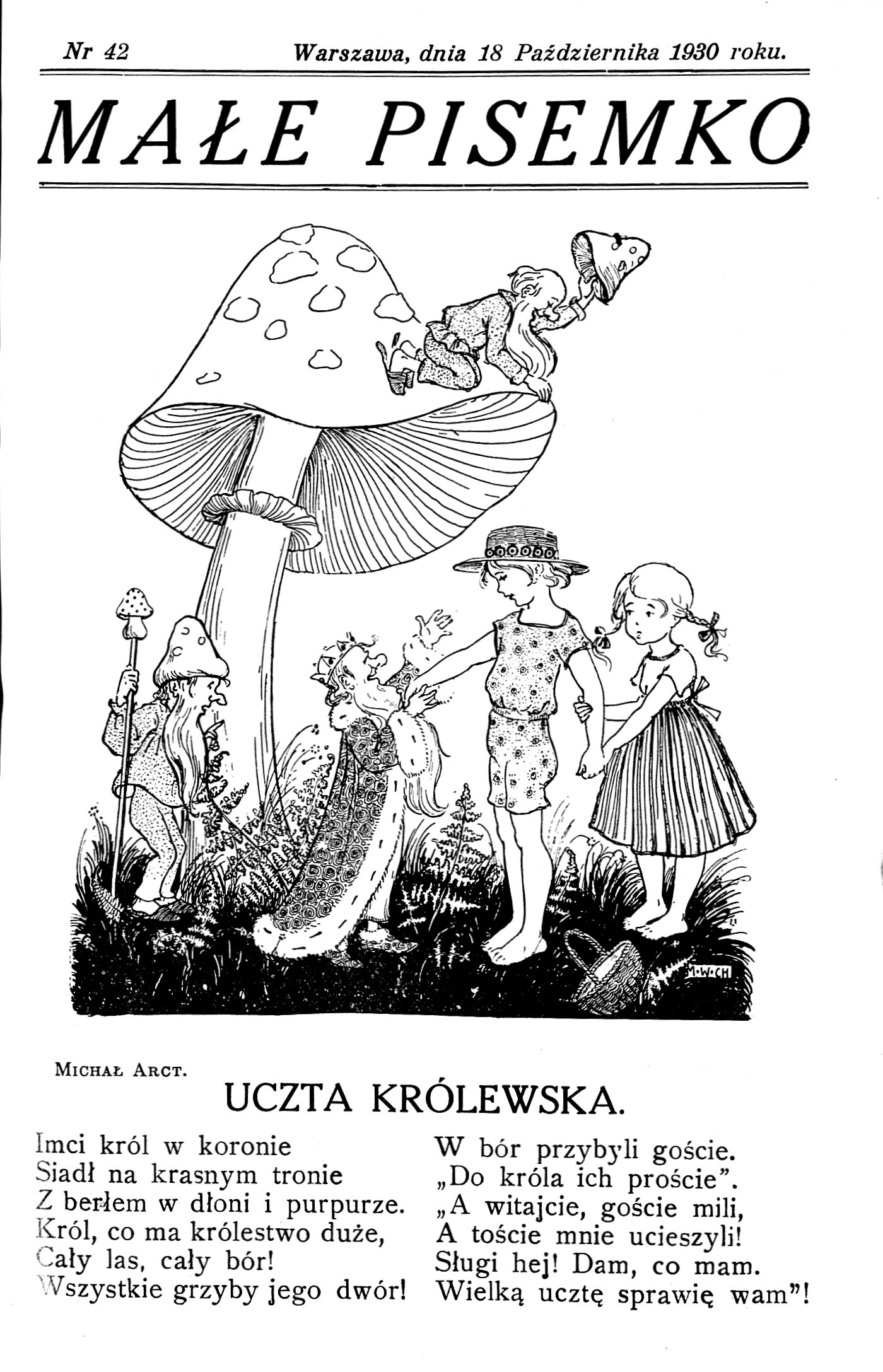
Cover of the 1930's magazine Małe pisemko, drawing by Maryla Weinles-Chaykin

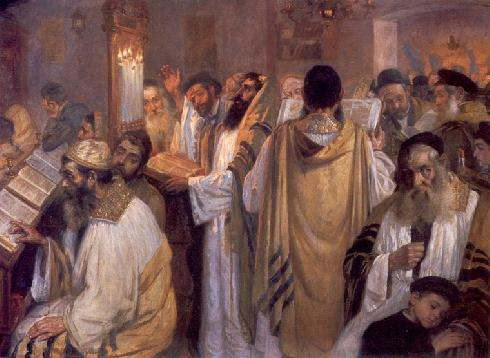
Jews praying on Yom Kippur by Jakub Weinles. In the collection of the National Museum in Warsaw.

Jasia Reichardt was born to Maryla Weinles and Seweryn Chaykin in Warsaw, Poland, in 1933. Her mother was an illustrator and pianist and her father an architect and engineer. Her maternal grandfather was Jakub Weinles (1870–1938), painter of works devoted mainly to Jewish and religious subjects, member of the Jewish Society for the Promotion of Fine Arts.

An assimilated middle-class Jewish family, Chaykins were overwhelmed by the German invasion of Poland in 1939 and were incarcerated among the capital's Jewish population in the Warsaw Ghetto. Jasia survived there for a while with her mother and maternal grandmother, Łucja Kaufman-Weinles, who tried to shield her from the unfolding horror. In 1942 she was smuggled out, but both her parents were murdered in the Treblinka extermination camp.

She was subsequently hidden under an assumed identity by a series of Poles, spending time in a convent, until she was able to join her mother's sister, Franciszka Themerson, and her husband, Stefan Themerson, in London in 1946. She attended Dartington Hall School and then went to study directing at the Bristol Old Vic Theatre School.

== Career ==
In the 1950s she was assistant editor of Art News and Review, for which she wrote numerous reviews, as well as exhibition introductions for various galleries of contemporary art. In the early 1960s she was the general editor of the "Art in Progress" series published by Methuen. She organised various exhibitions of new art, and in 1963 – 1971 was assistant director of the ICA

In 1968, she organised the ground-breaking Cybernetic Serendipity exhibition, and edited the special issue of Studio International, which replaced the catalogue. The same year, she curated Fluorescent Chrysanthemum, an exhibition of contemporary experimental Japanese art. Other exhibitions followed, including Play Orbit of objects to play with by British artists.

From 1974 to 1976 Reichardt was director of the Whitechapel Art Gallery. Between 1989 and 1998 she was one of the directors of Artec biennale in Nagoya. In 1998 she curated Electronically Yours, an exhibition of electronic portraiture at the Tokyo Metropolitan Museum of Photography. Apart from writing and organising exhibitions, she broadcast on the arts programme, "Critics’ Forum" for the BBC, 1965 – 1977. She collaborated with artists and continued to focus on the intersection of the arts and science on which she wrote a monthly column in the New Scientist. After 1990, she collaborated on various projects with Nick Wadley, until his death in 2017. She has taught at the Architectural Association and other colleges. After 1988, she organised the archive of Franciszka and Stefan Themerson; the 3 volume catalogue of the archive was published in 2020 and distributed by MIT.

She served on numerous committees; belonged to a number of professional organisations, gave lectures at conferences, and received several distinctions.

In 2022 the Australian National University's School of Cybernetics launched the school by presenting an exhibition Australian Cybernetic: a point through time. The exhibition included works from Cybernetic Serendipity (1968), Australia ‘75: Festival of Creative Arts and Science (1975), and contemporary pieces curated by the School of Cybernetics. In describing Reichardt's Cybernetic Serendipity exhibition the school stated that it "represented points of expanding the cybernetic imagination" and was a "ground-breaking" "glimpse of a future in which computers were entangled with people and cultures, and through this she fashioned a blueprint for the future of computing that has since inspired generations".

In 2024 Reichardt was honoured with an honorary doctorate from the Australian National University's School of Cybernetics. The Doctor of Letters degree was awarded by ANU Chancellor, the Hon. Julie Bishop, during a special ceremony in London.

== Personal life ==
Jasia Reichardt was married first to Tony Richards (later Reichardt), art dealer and collector, and secondly to art historian and artist Nick Wadley.

== Exhibitions organised by JR ==
in London unless otherwise indicated

- Image in Progress (first exhibition of Pop Art in London), Grabowski Gallery, 1962
- The Inner Image (between painting and sculpture), Grabowski Gallery, 1964
- Art in Britain 1930-40 (A tribute to Sir Herbert Read), Marlborough Fine Art and New London Gallery, 1965
- Between Poetry and Painting, ICA, 1965
- London Under Forty, Galleria Milano, Milan, 1966
- Essays in Narrative, Zwemmer Gallery, London, 1966
- Ventures, (experimental works in three dimensions), Arts Council touring exhibition, 1967
- Cybernetic Serendipity, ICA, 1968, also in Washington and San Francisco
- Fluorescent Chrysanthemum (new Japanese art, music and films), ICA, 1968–69, and Vancouver
- Play Orbit (playthings by artists), ICA, 1969–70
- Ten Sitting Rooms (created by artists), ICA, 1970
- Time, Words and the Camera (photoworks by British artists), Künstlerhaus, Graz, 1976–77
- Electronically Yours, Tokyo Metropolitan Museum of Photography, 1988
- Yolanda Sonnabend, House of Memory, Galeria Stara, Lublin, 2001
- Nearly Human, Łaźnia Centre for Contemporary Art II, Gdańsk, 2015
- Nick in Europe, 12 Star Gallery, London, 2018
- Nick in Gdańsk, Łaźnia Centre for Contemporary Art II, Gdańsk, 2019
- Fluorescent Chrysanthemum Remembered, Łaźnia Centre for Contemporary Art I, Gdańsk, 2019

== Bibliography ==
Articles in regular magazine series:

- Monthly column. Architectural Design. 1963-79
- Column on modern art. Apollo, 1960–63
- 'Developments in Style.' The London Magazine, 1962–64
- Column on art in London. Art d'aujourd'hui, 1962–66
- 'Comment.' Studio International, 1965–69
- 'Art at large,' on the connections between art and science. New Scientist, 1971–74
- Monthly column. Building Design, 1982–88
- Contributor to Artefactum, 1984–86
- Contributor to Cedal, Puerto Rico, 1986

Books written by:

- Victor Pasmore. Art in Progress series. London: Methuen & Co 1962. ASIN: B0000CLE70
- Yaacov Agam. Art in Progress series. London: Methuen. 1966. ASIN: B0006BSCLM
- The Computer in Art. London: Studio Vista. 1971
- Robots: Fact, Fiction, and Prediction. Thames & Hudson. 1978 ISBN 978-0500271230
- Magdalena Abakanowicz. New York: Abbeville Press. 1982. ISBN 0896593231.
- Fifteen Journeys from Warsaw to London. London: Dalkey Archive Press. 2012. ISBN 9781564787200

Books edited by:

- Series of 13 monographs on living artists 'Art in Progress', Methuen, 1962–66
- Hausmann, Raoul and Schwitters, Kurt; ed. Jasia Reichardt. PIN, Gaberbocchus Press (1962); Anabas-Verlag, Giessen. 1986
- Cybernetics, art, and ideas. Studio Vista. 1971
- Stefan Themerson - Collected Poems, Gaberbocchus Press/Uitgeverij De Harmonie, Amsterdam, 1997
- Stefan Themerson – Wiersze Wybrane 1939 – 1945, Wydawnictwo Uniwersytetu Śląskiego, Katowice, 2004
- Kurt Schwitters: Three Stories, Tate Publishing, 2010
- Unposted Letters [of] Franciszka and Stefan Themerson, Gaberbocchus & De Harmonie, Amsterdam, 2013
- The Themerson Archive Catalogue, MIT, 2020

Books contributed to:

- "Multiples" in The Year’s Art, Penguin Books, 1974
- "Op Art" in Concepts of Modern Art, Penguin Books, 1974
- "Art and Cybernetics" in Le Temps et la Cybernetique, Micromégas, 1975
- "After Malraux" in 360 degrees around Katsuhiro Yamaguchi, Rikuyo-sha Publishing Inc., 1981
- "Die Paradoxe mechanijsche Lebens" in Wunschmaschine Welterfindung, Springer, Vienna, 1966
- "In the beginning", White Heat Cold Logic, MIT, 2009
- "A meeting with Borges", with Borges, My Work in Prose, Obscure Publications, 2010
- "Borges", with Borges, My life in Books, Obscure Publications, 2010

Texts in exhibition catalogues include:

- Janina Baranowska. London: Grabowski Gallery. 1962. ASIN: B00MAPQH32
- Marc Vaux/Tess Jaray. London: Grabowski Gallery. 1963. ASIN: B0016702SG
- Peter Schmidt - Autobiographical Mono Prints. London: Lisson Gallery. 1970. ASIN: B00C3YNUP8
- Paul Van Hoeydonck Space Sculpture. London: Annely Juda Fine Art. 1973. ASIN: B001E0DNUY
- Folon, Jean-Michel; Reichardt, Jasia. FOLON "Catalogue of an exhibition organised by the Belgian Ministry of French Culture and held at the Institute of Contemporary Arts Gallery 21 April - 29 May 1977". 1977. London: Institute of Contemporary Arts Gallery. 1977. ASIN: B0010LNM3A
- Margaret Priest. Recent Drawings. London: Waddington Fine Art. 1980. ASIN: B002GE5TB8
- Liliane Lijn: Imagine the Goddess. London: Fischer Fine Art exhibition catalogue. 1987
- Karl Gerstner, First London Exhibition. Marlborough Fine Art (London) Ltd. 1999. ISBN 978-0900955785
- Andrew Logan, an Adventure in Art. Museum of Modern Art, Oxford. 1999. ISBN 978-0905836737
- Uncanny Valley: Recent Sculptures by Tim Lewis. Liverpool: National Museums and Galleries on Merseyside. 2004. ASIN: B00LXOO5V2
- Piero Fogliati - The Poet of Light. Turin, 2004. ISBN 978-8877571786
- Swinging London - The Grabowski Collection. Museum of Art in Łódź (Łódź: Muzeum Sztuki). 2007 ISBN 978-8387937485

Journals and magazines contributed to: AA files, Ambit, Architectural Review, Art Monthly, Art International, Art News, Arte Oggi, Arts, Arts Review, Artscribe, Arts Review, Billedkunst, Bonhams magazine, The British Journal of Aesthetics, Cambridge Opinion, Cimaise, Connoisseur, The Creative Holography Index, Domus, Eye, Image Roche, The Independent, Interdisciplinary Science Reviews, Konteksty, Das Kunstwerk, Kwartalnik Literacki, Leonardo, Marmo, Metro, Museumjournaal, Opus, Pagina, Pa`renthesis, Penrose Annual, Pix 1, Progressive Architecture, Quadrum, The Royal Academy Magazine, RSA Journal, Skira Annuel, Studio International, Sunday Times, Typographica, L'Uomo e l'Arte, Vytvarne Umeni, Zodiac, and others

== See also ==
- Algorithmic art
- Computer Art
- Electronic art
- Generative art
- New media art
- Virtual art
- Post-conceptual art
