= North Sheen Cemetery =

Cemetery in Kew, London

Coordinates: 51°28′16″N 0°16′42″W

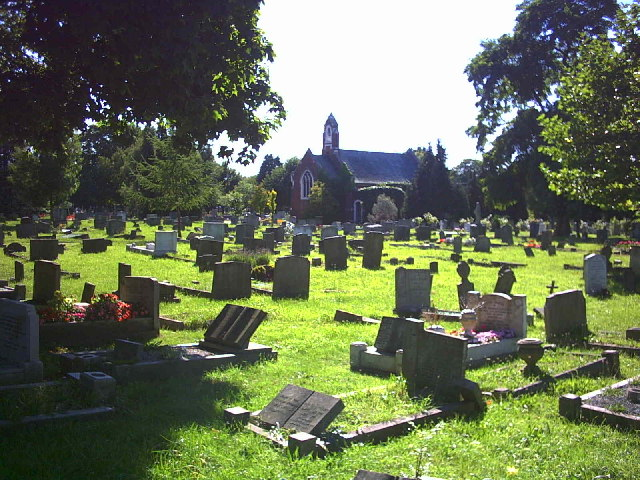
- Interactive map of North Sheen Cemetery

Details
- Established: 1909
- Location: Kew, London
- Country: England
- Type: Active
- Owned by: Hammersmith and Fulham Council

North Sheen Cemetery is a cemetery in Kew in the London Borough of Richmond upon Thames (historically in North Sheen, Surrey). It is managed by Hammersmith and Fulham Council.

The cemetery, which adjoins Mortlake Road (the A205 or South Circular Road) and Lower Richmond Road (the A316), opened in 1909 and is still in use. It is also known as Fulham New Cemetery as it provided burials for the then Metropolitan Borough of Fulham when the old Fulham Cemetery on Fulham Palace Road was full. It has a grid layout of paths and had a temporary chapel, which was replaced by a small red brick chapel in 1931. The chapel is in the gothic style, designed by Arthur Holden, Fulham Borough Surveyor & Engineer, with stained glass by Antoine Acket (1918–1981) added in 1953.

The cemetery includes 111 identified graves of Commonwealth service personnel in World War I and the World War II and a memorial garden.

== Notable burials ==
- William Banfield (1875-1945), Labour Member of Parliament
- Antoni Cwojdziński (1896–1972), Polish writer
- Gwyneth Dunwoody (née Phillips; 1930–2008), British Labour Party politician and the longest ever serving female MP in the UK Parliament
- Ferdynand Goetl (1890–1960), Polish writer and political activist who was forced to leave Poland after World War II due to his involvement in the German investigation of the Katyn massacre; he died in exile in London.
- Manuel Chaves Nogales (1897–1944), Spanish journalist and writer.
- Mateusz Grabowski (1904–1976), Polish pharmacist, owner of the notable Grabowski Gallery in London's Sloane Avenue and philanthropist who donated his majolica collection of pharmaceutical vessels to the Kraków Pharmaceutical Museum and his art collection to the Museum of Art in Łódź and the National Museum in Warsaw.
- Tadeusz Grodyński (1888–1958), Polish economist
- Stanisław Kot (1885–1975), Polish economist and politician. He was a member of the People's Party; and, during World War II held several senior posts in the Polish Government in Exile, as well as Polish ambassador to the Soviet Union and to Italy. In 1947, in the wake of the communist takeover of Poland, he became a political refugee, living in France and later in the United Kingdom, where he was the leader of the People's Party in exile.
- Herminia Naglerowa (1890–1957), Polish writer
- Witold Narbutt (1900–1957), Polish engineer
- Aleksandra Piłsudska (1882–1963), Polish political activist who was married to Polish leader Józef Piłsudski. She and her daughters fled to London after the German invasion of Poland in September 1939.
- Józef Retinger (1888–1960), Polish political adviser. He was a founder of the European Movement that would lead to the founding of the European Union and also founded the Bilderberg Group, an annual conference established in 1954 to foster dialogue between Europe and North America.
- Tony Smith (1894–1964), chimneysweep, who was awarded the George Cross for rescuing people from a bomb-damaged building in London in 1944. He was initially buried in an unmarked grave. In 1999 a new stone was dedicated by arrangement of the Royal Marines Association and supported by the Victoria Cross and George Cross Association, the Royal Marines Historical Societies and representatives from the Royal Borough of Kensington and Chelsea.
- Raine Spencer, Countess Spencer (1929–2016), British socialite, stepmother of Diana, Princess of Wales
- Wiesław Strzałkowski (1909–1988), Polish poet
- Charles Wells (1841–1922), British gambler and fraudster who, famously, broke the bank at Monte Carlo
- Adam Żółtowski (1881–1958), Polish linguist
- Henry Chaney (1882–1919) a British sports shooter and inventor of the first practical gun camera

== Gallery ==
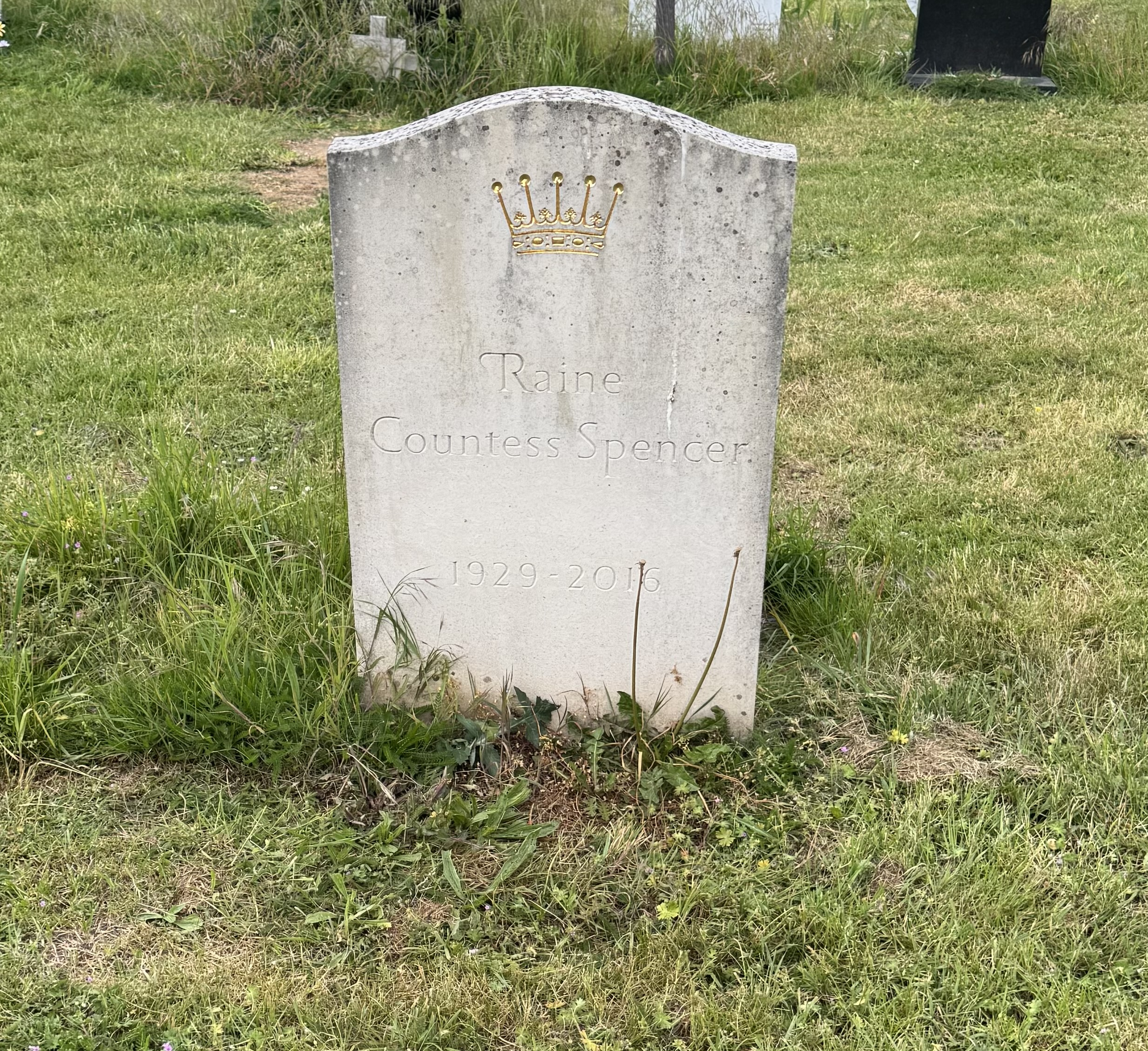
Raine Spencer, Countess Spencer headstone in 2026

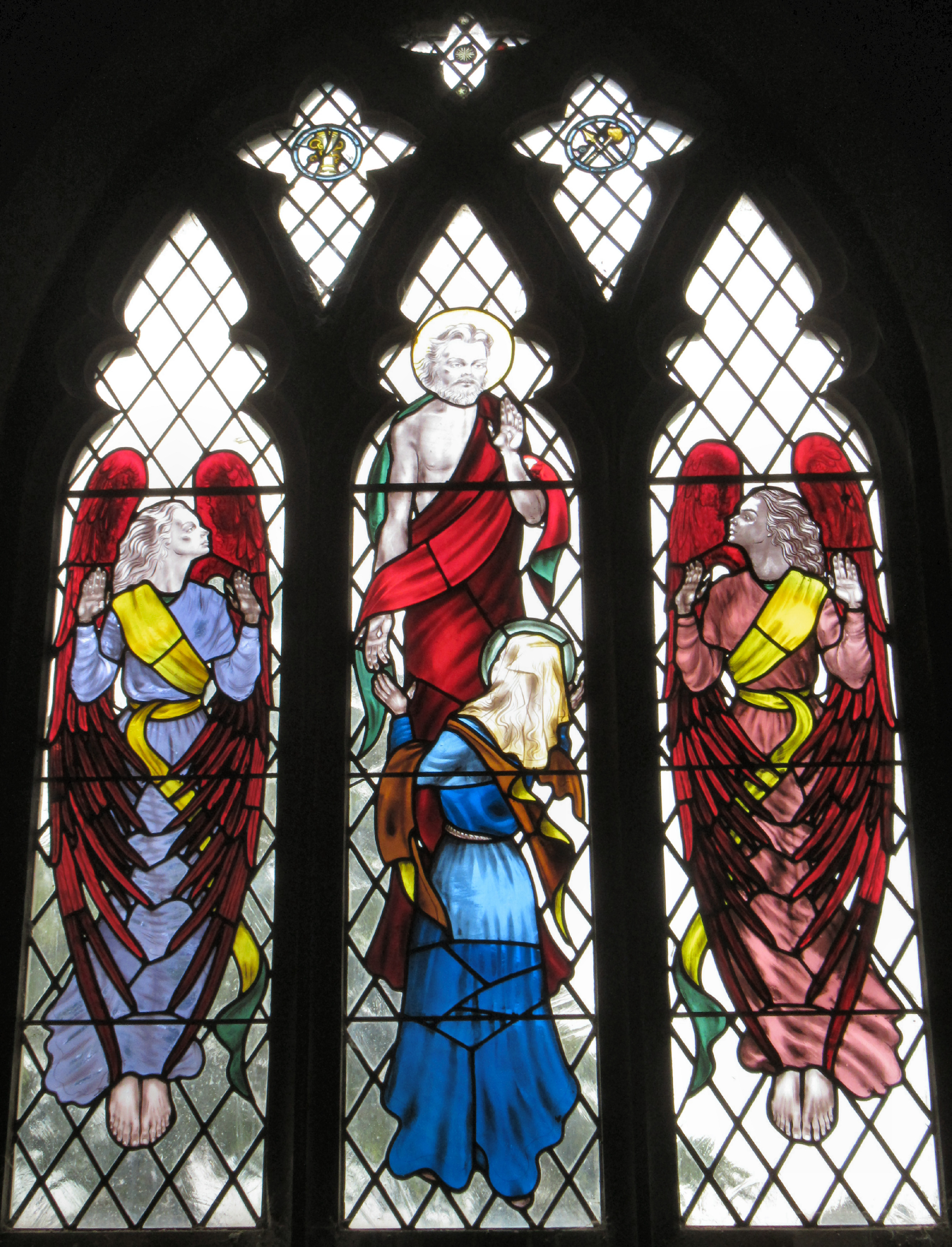
The chapel stained glass window

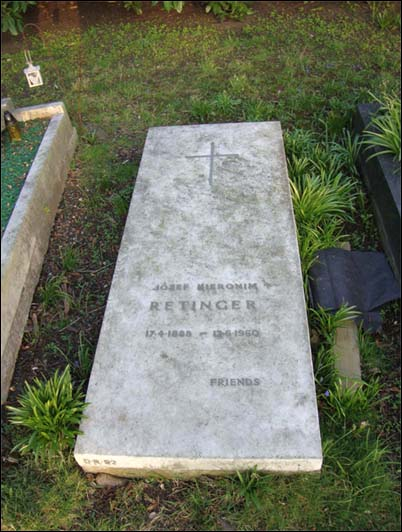
The grave of Józef Retinger

== See also ==
- Mortlake Cemetery (Hammersmith New Cemetery)
