= Manuel Chaves =

Manuel Chaves may refer to:

- Manuel Antonio Chaves (1818–1889), figure in U.S.-Navajo and U.S. Civil War history
- Manuel Chaves (politician) (born 1945), former Second Vice President of the Spanish Government
- Manuel Chaves Nogales, Spanish journalist
