= De Goede =

De Goede is a Dutch surname, meaning "the good". People with the surname include:

- Aar de Goede (1928–2016), Dutch politician, State Secretary of Finance 1973–77
- Eva de Goede (born 1989), Dutch field hockey player
- Jules de Goede (1937–2007), Dutch abstract artist in Australia and England
- Suzanne de Goede (born 1984), Dutch racing cyclist
- Sophie de Goede (born 1999), Canadian rugby player

The term was also used as a description of a number of medieval rulers, including:

- Karel de Goede (ca.1080–1127), Count of Flanders
- Willem de Goede (1287–1337), Count of Holland and Zeeland
- Filips de Goede (1396–1467), as Duke of Burgundy ruler of much of the Low Countries
