= U. A. Fanthorpe =

English poet (1929–2009)

U. A. Fanthorpe CBE
- Born: Ursula Askham Fanthorpe; 22 July 1929; London, England
- Died: 28 April 2009 (aged 79); Wotton-under-Edge, Gloucestershire, United Kingdom
- Citizenship: British
- Education: St Anne's College, Oxford
- Occupation: Poet
- Partner: R. V. "Rosie" Bailey (1965–2009; Fanthorpe's death)
- Writing career
- Pen name: U. A. Fanthorpe
- Period: 1978–2008
- Genre: Poetry
- Notable works: Side Effects; Collected Poems; From Me To You: Love Poems
- Notable awards: Fellow of the Royal Society of Literature; Queen's Gold Medal for Poetry

Ursula Askham Fanthorpe CBE FRSL (22 July 1929 – 28 April 2009) was an English poet, who published as U. A. Fanthorpe. Her poetry comments mainly on social issues.

== Life and work ==
=== Early years and education ===
Born in south-east London, Fanthorpe was the daughter of a judge, or as she put it "middle-class but honest parents". She was educated at St Catherine's School, Bramley, in Surrey, and at St Anne's College, Oxford, where she "came to life", taking a first in English.

=== Working life ===
She taught English at Cheltenham Ladies' College for 16 years, but then left teaching for jobs as a secretary, receptionist and hospital clerk in Bristol – in her poems, she later remembered some of the patients for whose records she had been responsible.

Fanthorpe's first volume of poetry, Side Effects (1978), has been said to "unsentimentally recover the invisible lives and voices of psychiatric patients." She was "Writer-in-Residence" at St Martin's College, Lancaster (now the University of Cumbria) in 1983–1985, and later Northern Arts Fellow at Durham and Newcastle universities.

Her 1984 volume Voices Off explores student life, critical vocabulary, and the finding that "naming is power". Her most famous poem is probably Atlas, which opens, "There is a kind of love called maintenance."

In 1987 Fanthorpe went freelance, giving readings around the country and occasionally abroad. In 1994 she was nominated for the post of Oxford Professor of Poetry. Her nine collections of poems were published by Peterloo Poets. Her Collected Poems was published in 2005.

=== Rosie Bailey ===
Many of Fanthorpe's poems bring in two voices. In her readings the other voice is that of the Bristol academic and teacher R. V. "Rosie" Bailey, Fanthorpe's life partner of 44 years. Both became Quakers in the 1980s. Both were committed Christians. They affirmed their long-term relationship with a Civil Partnership in 2006. The couple co-wrote a collection of poems, From Me To You: love poems, illustrated by Nick Wadley and published in 2007 by Enitharmon.

=== Death ===
Fanthorpe died of cancer aged 79 on 28 April 2009, in a hospice near her home in Wotton-under-Edge, Gloucestershire.

== Awards ==
Fanthorpe was a Fellow of the Royal Society of Literature, and was appointed Commander of the Order of the British Empire (CBE) in the 2001 New Year Honours for services to literature. In 2003 she received the Queen's Gold Medal for Poetry. Among many other awards and honours she was awarded an Honorary Degree (Doctor of Letters) from the University of Bath.

== Bibliography ==
- Side Effects. Harry Chambers/Peterloo Poets. 1978. ISBN 978-0-905291-14-7.
- Four Dogs – a poem, Treovis Press, Liskeard, Cornwall. 1980
- Standing to. Harry Chambers/Peterloo Poets. 1982.
- Voices off. Harry Chambers/Peterloo Poets. 1984. ISBN 978-0-905291-60-4.
- Selected Poems. Penguin. 1986. ISBN 978-0-14-007572-4.
- A watching brief. Peterloo Poets. 1987. ISBN 978-0-905291-87-1.
- Neck-verse. Peterloo Poets. 1992. ISBN 978-1-871471-33-5.
- Safe as House. Peterloo Poets. 1995. ISBN 978-1-871471-59-5.
- Consequences. Peterloo Poets. 2000. ISBN 978-1-871471-83-0.
- U. A. Fanthorpe (2002). Christmas Poems. Illustrator Nick Wadley. Enitharmon Press. ISBN 978-1-900564-13-7.
- Dymock: The Time and the Place. Cyder Press. 2002. ISBN 978-1-86174-121-9.
- Queueing for the Sun. Peterloo Poets. 2003. ISBN 978-1-904324-08-9.
- Collected poems 1978–2003. Peterloo Poets. 2005. ISBN 978-1-904324-20-1.
- From Me To You, Love Poems. U. A. Fanthorpe and R. V. Bailey, London: Enitharmon Press 2007
- In a Highland Gift Shop. U. A. Fanthorpe, Edinburgh: Mariscat Press 2013. ISBN 978-0-946588-68-8
- New and Collected Poems 1978–2009. Enitharmon Press. 2010. ISBN 978-1-907587-00-9.
- U. A. Fanthorpe Selected Poems. Enitharmon Press. 2013. ISBN 978-1-907587-26-9.
- Berowne's Book. Enitharmon Press. 2015. ISBN 978-1-910392-13-3.
- Eddie Wainwright (1995). Taking stock: a first study of the poetry of U. A. Fanthorpe. Peterloo Poets. ISBN 978-1-871471-47-2.
- Sandie, Elizabeth (2009). Acts of Resistance: The Poetry of U. A. Fanthorpe. Calstock Cornwall: Peterloo Poets. ISBN 978-1-904324-53-9.
- U. A. Fanthorpe: Beginner's Luck, ed. R V Bailey. Bloodaxe, 2019. ISBN 978-1-78037-474-1
