= Mareva Grabowski-Mitsotakis =

Greek business executive (born 1966)

- Μαρέβα Γκραμπόφσκα-Μητσοτάκη / Mareva Grabowska-Mitsotaki
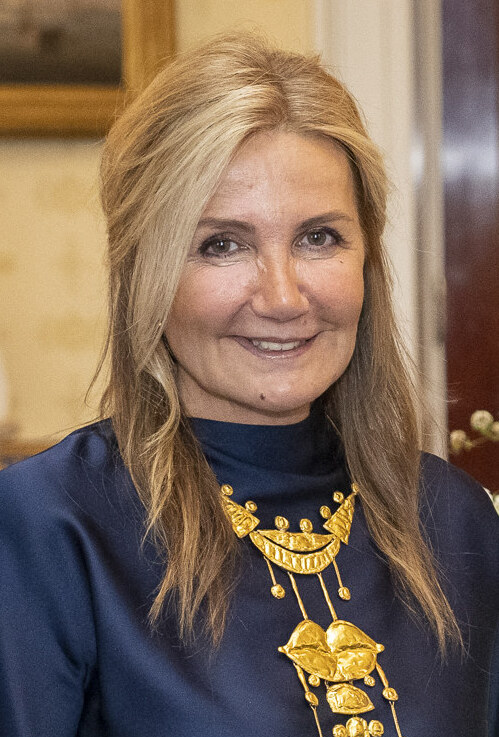
- Grabowski-Mitsotakis in 2022

Spouse of the Prime Minister of Greece
- Current
- Assumed role 26 June 2023
- Prime Minister: Kyriakos Mitsotakis
- Preceded by: Stella Tsagkari (caretaker)
- In role 8 July 2019 – 25 May 2023
- Prime Minister: Kyriakos Mitsotakis
- Preceded by: Peristera Baziana
- Succeeded by: Stella Tsagkari (caretaker)

Personal details
- Born: Maria-Eva-Virginia Grabowski; June 30, 1966 (age 60) Athens, Kingdom of Greece (now Greece)
- Spouse: Kyriakos Mitsotakis (m. 1997)
- Children: 3
- Relatives: Mateusz Grabowski (grandfather)
- Education: Boston College; Columbia University; Harvard University
- Occupation: Businesswoman

Mareva Grabowski-Mitsotakis (Greek: Μαρέβα Γκραμπόφσκι-Μητσοτάκη, romanized: Mitsotaki; Polish: Grabowska; born June 30, 1966) is a Greek business executive who has promoted Greek cultural heritage through her finance and fashion entrepreneurial ventures. She is married to Kyriakos Mitsotakis, the current Prime Minister of Greece.

== Early life ==
Mareva Grabowski-Mitsotakis was born Maria-Eva-Virginia Grabowski in Athens in 1966 to a family with roots in Greece and Poland. Her maternal grandfather, Philippos, was an who served as a naval architect and was president of Det Norske Veritas. Her Polish paternal grandfather, Mateusz Grabowski operated a pharmaceutical company. Her father continued the family’s pharmaceutical business in London and was a collector of rare coins, stamps, and art, and established the Grabowski Gallery in the United Kingdom.

Grabowski-Mitsotakis earned a BA in political science at Boston College. She completed an M.I.A. in political economy at Columbia University's School of International and Public Affairs. She received an MBA from Harvard Business School where she met her future husband, Kyriakos Mitsotakis, in 1995.

== Career ==
Grabowski-Mitsotakis was vice president of the investment banking department at Bankers Trust in London. From 1998 to 2007, she worked at Deutsche Bank as a vice president in the institutional equity management department and later managing director of private coverage. Following her time at Deutsche Bank, she founded MG Capital Advisors S.A., an independent advisory firm specializing in portfolio management for corporate and private clients. In 2010, Grabowski-Mitsotakis started Eternia Capital, an asset management firm concentrating on hedge fund investments. She is listed in the Paradise Papers. As of 2017, Grabowski-Mitsotakis owned fifty percent of an offshore company, Eternia Capital Management in the Cayman Islands. This match is verified by the Appleby law firm and listed in Cayman records on 30 March 2010.

By 2012, Grabowski-Mitsotakis co-founded Endeavor Greece, an organization aimed at supporting high-impact entrepreneurs in Greece through mentorship and networking. In 2012, she co-founded Zeus+Dione, a luxury fashion brand specializing in Greek-inspired women's apparel, accessories, and homeware. The company sourced its materials from Greece. She played a role in the creative and operational direction of the brand. In June 2020, she announced her intention to step down from her roles at Zeus+Dione and Endeavor, selling her shares in the company.

In April 2024, Grabowski-Mitsotakis announced plans to sue Greek member of parliament Elena Akrita for alleged slander after Akrita accused her of undisclosed property ownership and improper influence. Her husband and prime minister, Kyriakos Mitsotakis called for Akrita’s parliamentary immunity to be lifted to enable the lawsuit.

== Personal life ==
In 1997, Mareva Grabowski married Kyriakos Mitsotakis in Plaka, Athens, who would later become Prime Minister of Greece, with whom she has three children. They experienced a period of separation from 2006 to 2014, during which they filed for divorce, although they ultimately reconciled. Their separation led to legal distinctions in their financial disclosures, a matter discussed publicly due to Mitsotakis's political career.

The Grabowski-Mitsotakis family faced public scrutiny regarding property ownership and finances, particularly concerning the acquisition of an apartment in Paris. This purchase was made through a French entity, SCI Personal Ventures, and financed via a 25-year mortgage. Grabowski-Mitsotakis has stated that all financial dealings were conducted in accordance with Greek and French legal requirements.

Grabowski-Mitsotakis speaks Greek, English, French, and Turkish.

In a 2020 interview with the Financial Times, Grabowski-Mitsotakis highlighted her appreciation for antique items and her fondness for brooches, which were passed down to her from her mother and grandmother. She also has an interest in the arts and literature, particularly those by artist Mark Rothko and the book Who Owns History? by Geoffrey Robertson.

== See also ==
- List of spouses of heads of government
- List of people and organisations named in the Paradise Papers
