= Mortlake Crematorium =

Crematorium in Kew, London

Coordinates: 51.4728°N 0.2735°W

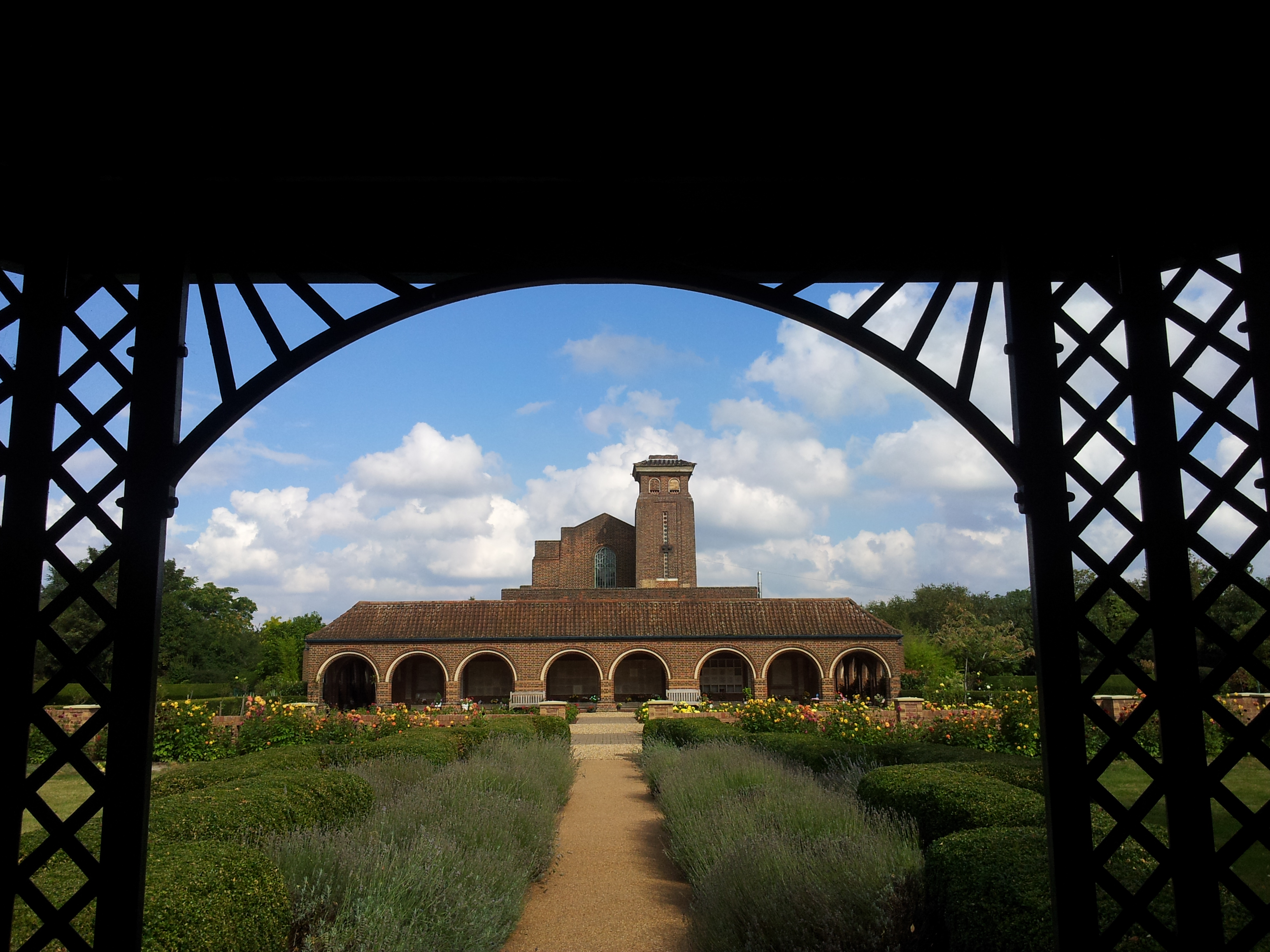
- Interactive map of the Mortlake Crematorium area

General information
- Type: Crematorium
- Location: Kew Meadow Path; Richmond; TW9 4EN; England; United Kingdom; Area: Kew, London Borough of Richmond upon Thames
- Construction started: 1936
- Completed: 1939
- Opening: 1939
- Cost: £27,000
- Owner: London boroughs of Ealing, Hammersmith & Fulham, Hounslow and Richmond upon Thames
- Operator: Mortlake Crematorium Board

Design and construction
- Architect: Douglas Barton
- Developer: Hammersmith Metropolitan Borough Council

Website
- www.mortlakecrematorium.org

Listed Building – Grade II
- Official name: Mortlake Crematorium
- Designated: 5 May 2011
- Reference no.: 1400834

Mortlake Crematorium Act 1936
- Act of Parliament
- Parliament of the United Kingdom
- Long title: An Act to constitute a joint board comprising representatives of the Hammersmith Borough Council and the corporations of Acton Barnes and Richmond to authorise the Board to provide and maintain a crematorium and for other purposes.
- Citation: 26 Geo. 5 & 1 Edw. 8. c. xxi

Dates
- Royal assent: 31 July 1936

Mortlake Crematorium is a crematorium in Kew, near its boundary with Mortlake, in the London Borough of Richmond upon Thames. It opened in 1939, next to Mortlake Cemetery.

The crematorium serves the boroughs of Ealing, Hammersmith & Fulham, Hounslow and Richmond upon Thames in the west and south-west of London. It is managed by a board made up of three elected councillors from each of these four boroughs.

Citing it as "a rare example" of Art Deco design in the borough, Richmond upon Thames Council has described it as "a building of exceptional quality and character". Environmentalist Colin Hines describes it as "probably the most undiscovered deco treasure in London". Hilary Grainger, writing in Encyclopedia of Cremation, describes the architectural style as Italianate and the building as having "beautiful cloisters with discrete brick detailing". It has been a Grade II listed building since 2011, being assessed by Historic England as having "a distinctive Art Deco design that survives little altered in a compact and practical composition".

== Location ==
The crematorium is on Kew Meadow Path, Townsmead Road, Kew. It is situated on the south bank of the River Thames by Chiswick Bridge and in Clifford Avenue, adjoining Mortlake Cemetery (Hammersmith New Cemetery) in the angle of Mortlake Road (which forms part of the A205, the South Circular Road) and the A316 road. The nearest train stations are Kew Gardens (for London Underground and London Overground trains) and Mortlake (for South Western Railway services).

== History ==
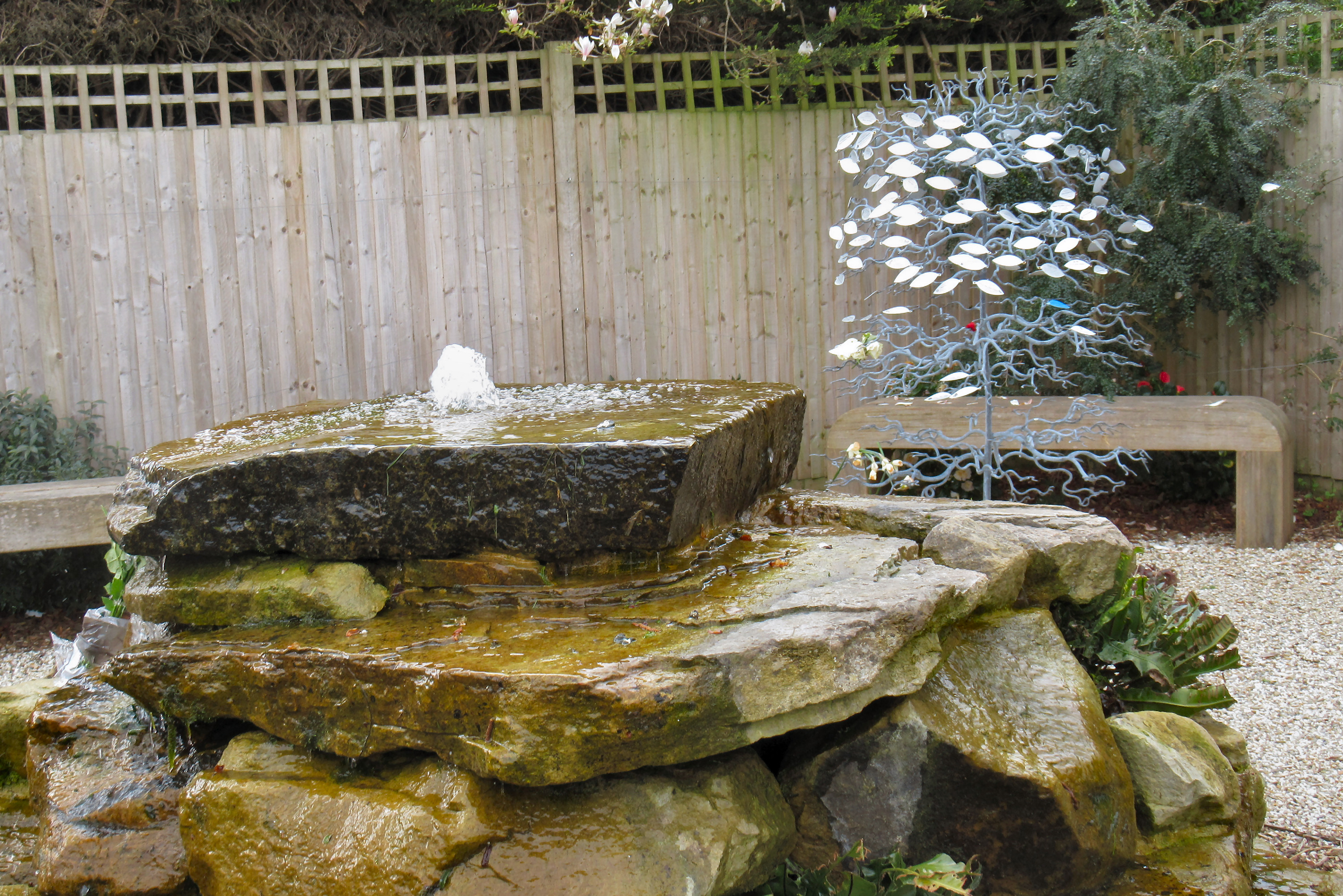
Garden of Remembrance in the crematorium's grounds

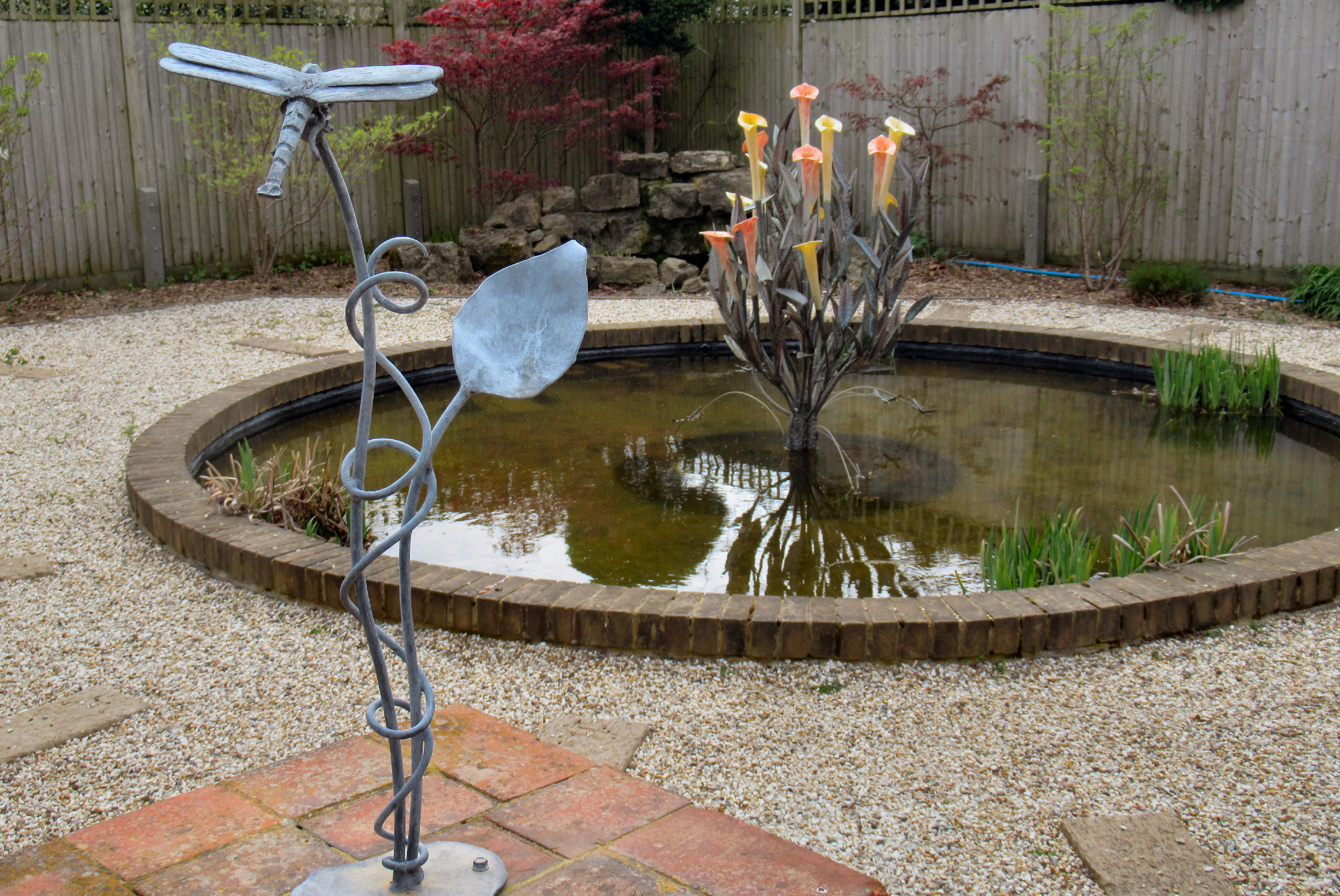
Garden of Remembrance, Babies & Children Garden, with a glass sculpture of flowers

Mortlake Crematorium was built on the site of Pink's Farm, which had belonged to Richard Atwood, whose family were prominent market gardeners in the area.

It was licensed in 1936 under the Mortlake Crematorium Act 1936, thereby becoming the first to be established under its own act of Parliament. Designed by Douglas Barton, borough surveyor to Hammersmith Metropolitan Borough Council, the building was constructed in three years at a cost of £27,000. It was also equipped with a Garden of Remembrance for the burial or scattering of ashes, and also offered panels and niches in which ashes could be deposited. When the facility was finally opened in January 1939 by Lord Horder, the then Physician to the King, he said: "You seem to have eliminated the sombreness of atmosphere which sometimes shrouds buildings such as these". After that, there was very little change in Mortlake Crematorium's outward appearance until 1982, when Colin Gilbert, an architect from Ealing, designed additional gardens between the crematorium and the River Thames. Since 2015 the crematorium has had a memorial garden dedicated to the memory of babies and children, based on Doris Stickley's story "Water Bugs and Dragonflies".

Three new, larger cremators were installed in the crematory in 2012.

== Notable cremations ==
Among those cremated here were:

- Charles Ancliffe (1880–1952), Irish-born composer of light music, who is chiefly remembered for his salon piano music, genre dance pieces, light character pieces and his waltz "Nights of Gladness"
- Trevor Baylis (1937–2018), inventor, whose body was cremated in a novelty coffin fashioned as the wind-up radio that he had invented
- Richard Beckinsale (1947–1979), actor
- Frederick Bentham (1911–2001), theatre lighting designer and engineer
- Tarka Cordell (1966–2008), musician
- Tommy Cooper (1921–1984), comedian and magician
- Sir Robin Day (1923–2000), political broadcaster and commentator
- Roger Delgado (1918–1973), actor, most famous for playing The Master in Doctor Who
- Sheila Dunn (1940–2004), stage and television actress
- Kenny Everett (1944–1995), radio DJ and television entertainer
- Edd Gould (1988–2012), animator, voice actor and creator of Eddsworld
- Charles Hawtrey (1914–1988), comedy actor
- Valerie Hobson (1917–1998), actress
- John Hutchinson (1884–1972), botanist, taxonomist and author
- Arthur Koestler (1905–1983), author
- James Edgar Leach (1892–1958), Victoria Cross recipient, World War I
- Charles Lightoller (1874–1952), second officer of the RMS Titanic
- Lord Longford (Frank Pakenham) (1905–2001), politician and social reformer
- Ernestine Mills (1871–1959), artist, writer and suffragette
- Kirsty MacColl (1959–2000), singer-songwriter
- Jimmy Perry (1923–2016), actor and scriptwriter, who devised and co-wrote the BBC television sitcom Dad's Army
- Christopher Price (1967–2002), radio and television broadcaster
- John Profumo (1915–2006), politician, Secretary of State for War
- Sir Michael Redgrave (1908–1985), actor, author and director
- Gordon Reid (1939–2003), Scottish actor
- Prince Alexander Romanov (1929–2002), member of the Russian Imperial Family
- Dame Maggie Smith (1934–2024), actress
- Sir Denis Thatcher, Bt (1915–2003), businessman and husband of Margaret Thatcher
- Margaret Thatcher, Baroness Thatcher (1925–2013), Prime Minister of the United Kingdom
- Alexander Trocchi (1925–1984), Scottish novelist
- Stephen Ward (1912–1963), osteopath and artist who was one of the central figures in the Profumo affair
- Kit West (1936–2016), special effects artist, known for his work on Raiders of the Lost Ark and Return of the Jedi

=== World War II memorial ===
Seventy-nine Commonwealth service personnel of World War II were cremated here and their names are listed on a screen wall memorial erected by the Commonwealth War Graves Commission in the adjoining Mortlake Cemetery (Hammersmith New Cemetery). They include England rugby international Vivian Davies (1899–1941), who was a Captain in the Royal Artillery.
