= Tim Gosling =

British furniture designer (born 1966)

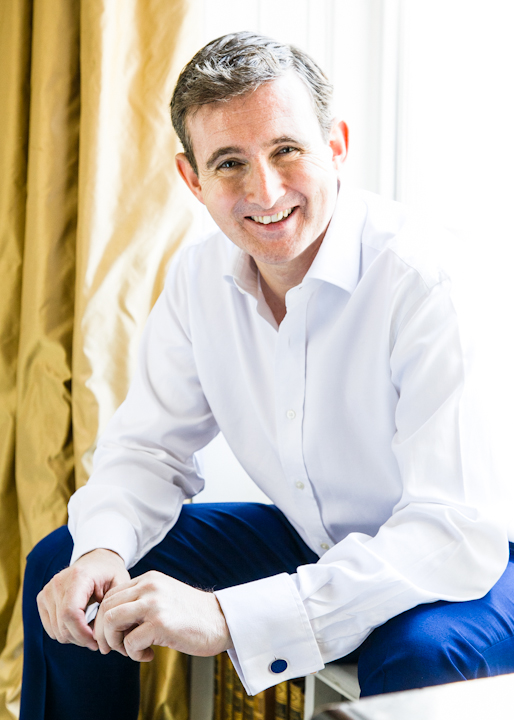
- Born: 23 August 1966 (age 60); Kingston, Jamaica
- Occupation: Furniture designer
- Known for: Classically inspired contemporary design

Timothy Job Gosling (born 23 August 1966) is a British furniture designer based in London. The Sunday Times has described him as a "designer to the rich and famous".

== Early life and education ==
Gosling was born in Kingston, Jamaica in 1966. His father was scientist Raymond Gosling. Gosling studied Theatre Design at Central St Martins School of Art and Design, London graduating in 1987 then designed theatre designs for John Napier and Sir Cameron Mackintosh. He started his career designing furniture in 1990 with David Linley, the son of Princess Margaret, becoming Senior Design Director in 1993.

== Career ==
In 2005, Gosling founded Gosling Ltd, designing bespoke furniture and combining traditional materials, craftsmanship with technology and contemporary interpretations of historical designs. Furniture identifiable by contemporary reworking of classical proportions, inlaid woods, gilding, verre eglomise and straw marquetry combined with more contemporary materials such as acrylic. According to Gosling the furniture is based on the best materials, exquisite quality of craftsmanship and integrity of design. He is quoted as declaring that "Minimalism is lost on me I am afraid."

Gosling Marine established in 2013 designing Art Deco inspired Super Yacht carbon fibre deck furniture, and, in 2013, a range for The Rug Company based on Art Deco designs.

Public examples of interior design include the Goring Hotel (following on from the Swarovski chandeliered Dining Room that he designed with David Linley in 2005) to also include the Drawing Room, Bar, Terrace as well as a selection of the Suites and the interior foyer areas of the listed 1930's Art Deco building Nell Gwynn House, Chelsea. He has also contributed interior design to the Savoy and Berkeley hotels in London.

Private examples include bespoke furniture and libraries for apartments, houses, Stately Homes, super yachts and corporate offices. Tim Gosling designed the private London home of Lord Browne of Madingley Gosling lectures and speaks on architectural interior design and furniture.

His work has been featured in the Financial Times on several occasions. It was also featured in the books Spectacular Homes of London and Quintessentially Living, vol. 2.

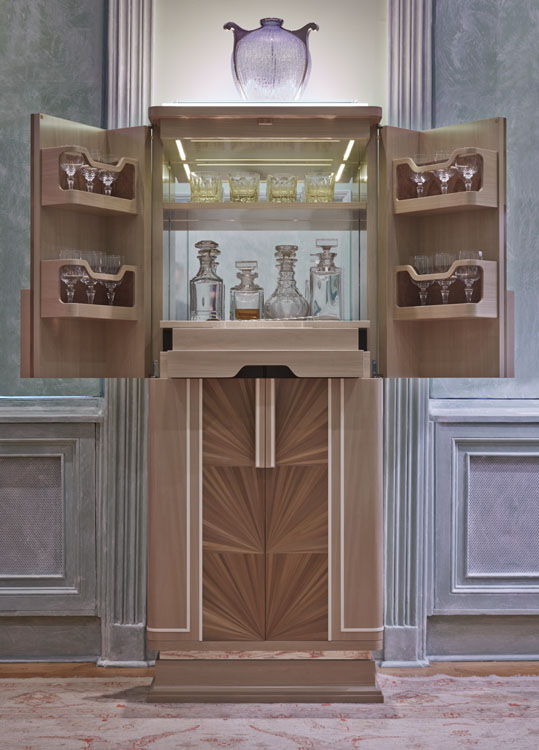
Gosling straw marquetry bar cabinet

== Exhibitions and awards ==
He has been nominated for The International Product Design Award 2014 - Nomination for Bespoke Cabinetry. He exhibited a selection of architectural pencil drawings at The Halcyon Gallery, Bond Street, London in 2012. He, together with colleague David Linley, designed a beechwood Tiara for the Tiaras : Crowned Heads and Coronets Exhibition in 2001 at the Victoria and Albert Museum.

== Books ==
- Gosling, Tim (2009). Gosling : Classic Design for Contemporary Interiors. Munich: Prestel Publishing. ISBN 978-3791343648.
- Gosling, Tim; Hudson, Roger; Crichton-Miller, Emma (2012). London Secrets : a Draughtsman's Guide. London: Endeavour London Ltd. ISBN 978-1908271686.
- Gosling, Tim (2015) Classic Contemporary: The DNA of Furniture Design Thames & Hudson ISBN 978-0-500-51783-3
