= Caziel =

Polish artist (1906–1988)

- Born: Kazimierz Józef Zielenkiewicz; 16 June 1906; Sosnowiec, Świętokrzyskie Voivodeship, Poland
- Died: 25 August 1988 (aged 82); Somerset
- Known for: Painting
- Movement: School of Paris, Cubism, Abstraction

Caziel (born Kazimierz Józef Zielenkiewicz; 16 June 1906 – 25 August 1988) was a Polish artist who lived and worked in Paris during the inter-war period and who worked alongside a number of important figures of the School of Paris, including Pablo Picasso and the art dealer Daniel-Henry Kahnweiler.

== Early years ==
After a few years living in Russia, Caziel, his mother and stepfather fled Moscow, following the Russian Revolution (1917). Unable to return to their native Poland, they were forced to spend three years in Krasnoyarsk. Then a young boy, Caziel had to work for food and money, and among the many odd jobs he undertook he swept the studios of the local art school, as well as posing as a model for the life classes. Caziel was taken as a protégé of the art school director and was encouraged by other students to draw and to take interest in art. By the time Caziel and his parents finally reached Poland in 1920, he had decided he would be an artist.

The early development of Caziel as a painter took place in Warsaw amongst artists greatly influenced by the School of Paris. His early work, dating 1930s, carried many features characteristic of the expressive manner later so explicit in the works painted in France. In 1931 Caziel entered the Academy of Fine Arts in Warsaw and became one of the favoured students of Professor Tadeusz Pruszkowski, who ran the academy.

== Career in France ==
During the Second World War, following the defeat of the Polish army, Caziel went into hiding in Aix-en-Provence, where he found himself at the centre of the milieu of Cézanne. As a tribute to the great modern master, Caziel painted a series of nudes, shaped by strong contour lines, placed in unusual compositions of depth and perspective and painted with simple colours. He also followed Cézanne in making the Mont Sainte Victoire his subject for a series of small oils.

Back in Paris in 1947 Caziel developed an individual and colourful form of cubist abstraction. He had befriended Picasso who introduced him to the great modernists Le Corbusier and Brâncuși. In Paris Caziel first exhibited at the Galerie Allard (1947), then with Bernheim-Jeune (1948) and at the Salon de Mai (1948–1956). In 1946 he decorated the Polish pavilion at the UNESCO exhibition.

During the 1950s, Caziel's paintings evolved into rigorous geometrical patterns, anticipating his pure abstract works of the 1960s. These abstract works were exhibited in London at the Grabowski Gallery.

== British period and late life ==
In 1952, while married to the painter Lutka Pink, Caziel met Catherine Sinclair, also a painter and the eldest daughter of Archibald Sinclair, 1st Viscount Thurso, Secretary of State for Air during the war under Winston Churchill. His divorce from Lutka came five years later and then he married Catherine with whom he had a daughter Clementina.

In 1966 and 1968 Caziel had two successful solo exhibitions at the Grabowski Gallery in London and exhibited work at the Royal Academy of Arts. In 1969 he moved to Somerset and was naturalised as a British citizen in 1975.

In Somerset, during the last years of his life, Caziel continue to explore Abstraction until his death in 1988. His Estate is represented by Whitford Fine Art, London.

== Chronology ==
1906: Born in Sosnowiec, Poland, on 6 June.
1931–36: Studied painting at the Warsaw Academy of Fine Art.
1932–37: Exhibited at Loza Wolnomalarska (Lodge of Free Painters).
1937: Won a State Scholarship to travel to Italy and Paris; in Paris lived with Polish painter Lutka Pink.
1938: Returned to Poland for the commission of a large fresco for the Observatory of Pop Ivan at Lvow.
1939: Back in Paris, volunteered for the Polish Army in France; stationed at Ceotquidan, Brittany; Married Lutka Pink; Partook in ‘Peintres moblises’ at the Bernheim-Jeune Gallery, Paris.
1940: Following disbanding of the Polish Army, Caziel found refuge with Blaise Cendrars in Aix-en-Provence.
1941–44: The Resistance moved Caziel to a mountain estate in the Auvergne.
1944–46: Back in Aix-en-Provence Caziel steeped himself in the painting of Cézanne.
1946: Moved to Paris; Designed the Polish Pavilion for UNESCO International Exhibition of Modern Art.
1947: One-man show at the Galerie Allard, Paris.
1948: Met Picasso with whom he developed a long-standing friendship.
1948–1956: Exhibited at the Salon de Mai in Paris.
1951: The Musée National d’Art Moderne purchased one of his monumental canvas works.
1952: Met Scottish painter Catherine Sinclair. Together they decided to settle in Ponthevrard, just outside Paris.
1953: Vatican commissioned four large paintings for their Museum of Modern Religious Art; First designs for frescoes for French architect Jean Ginsberg.
1956: Divorced Lutka Pink; First visit to England for engagement to Catherine Sinclair.
1957: Married Catherine Sinclair.
1958: Birth of daughter Clementina.
1963: Exterior design for the Atomic Energy Commission at Tollemache House, Thurso, Scotland.
1966: First one-man in London, held at the Grabowski Gallery.
1968: Second one-man show at the Grabowski Gallery, London.
1968–70: Exhibited at Royal Academy of Arts, London.
1969: Left Ponthevrard to settle in Somerset, England.
1978: Exhibited at the National Museum, Warsaw – Circle of Tadeusz Pruszkowski.
1983: Exhibited works on paper at the Summer Exhibition at Fair Maids House Gallery, North Port, Perth.
1988: Died in Somerset; Bequeathed ten paintings to the National Museum, Warsaw bringing their total number to seventeen works.
1990: Memorial Exhibition at the Polish Cultural Institute, London.
1991: Exhibition of oils, pastels and drawings at the Butlin Gallery, Dillington House College, Ilminster, Somerset.
1992: Exhibition of works from 1945 to 1988 at the Royal West of England Academy, Bristol.
1995: Exhibition CAZIEL: Substance and Light at Whitford Fine Art, London.
1997: Exhibition CAZIEL: Drawings from the Forties at Whitford Fine Art, London; Exhibition CAZIEL: Drawings from the Fifties Whitford Fine Art, London.
1998: CAZIEL, Retrospective Exhibition at the National Museum, Warsaw.
2001: Exhibition CAZIEL – Contour and Line: Selection of Works on Paper from 1965 at Whitford Fine Art, London.
2004: Exhibition CAZIEL: Abstraction: 1963–1967 at Whitford Fine Art, London; Retrospective Exhibition at the Embassy of the Republic of Poland, London.
2006: Centenary Retrospective Exhibition at Whitford Fine Art, London.
2008: Exhibition CAZIEL – Je Suis Abstrait: Works from the 1950s at Whitford Fine Art, London.
2010: Exhibition CAZIEL – Drawings and Watercolours 1935–1952: The Paris Years at Whitford Fine Art, London.
2012: Exhibition CAZIEL: In Search of a New Reality – Abstract Works 1948 – 1955 at Whitford Fine Art, London.
2014: Exhibition CAZIEL: Forever Yours – Paintings and Drawings 1948 – 1955 at Whitford Fine Art, London.
2018: Exhibition CAZIEL: Painting Lacerated Rhythms at Whitford Fine Art, London.
