= Grabowski Gallery =

- Formation: 1959
- Dissolved: 1975
- Type: Art gallery
- Legal status: defunct
- Purpose: contemporary art exhibitions
- Location: 84 Sloane Avenue, London, SW3 DZ
- Coordinates: 51.4934°N 0.1682°W
- Founded by: Mateusz Grabowski

The Grabowski Gallery was an avant-garde art gallery opened in 1959 in London's Chelsea by Mateusz Grabowski, anticipating the Swinging Sixties. It hosted some of the earliest shows of the rising pop art movement and was the first venue in London to bring op art to the public. It launched the careers of some of Britain's and the British Commonwealth's leading exponents of two- and three-dimensional art and fostered émigré artists from Europe, the Caribbean and the Commonwealth. By the time it closed its doors in 1975 it had mounted around two hundred shows. When the gallery closed Mateusz Grabowski donated his collection of works from the gallery to the Museum of Art in Łódź and the National Museum in Warsaw, Poland.

== History ==
Founded in 1959, the gallery started as a sideline of the Polish émigré pharmacist, Mateusz Grabowski (1904-1976), who had arrived in the United Kingdom as an officer of the Polish Armed Forces in 1940. After demobilisation in the late 1940s following the Second World War, Grabowski formed a pharmaceutical business, having worked as a pharmacist in Warsaw before the war. His innovation in London was to create a mail order chemist to enable Polish and other resettled Central Europeans in Britain and in other parts of the Free World during the Cold War to send badly needed medicines and medical supplies to their families and friends in countries under Soviet occupation where there were persistent shortages of many everyday goods. His successful business allowed him eventually to indulge his youthful passion for art, first as a collector and subsequently as a patron, by opening a gallery next to one of his chemist outlets at 84 Sloane Avenue in Chelsea. It was an avowedly non-commercial venture. He reputedly mounted exhibitions in exchange for an artwork by the artist. One of its earliest shows was a group exhibition of established Polish artists.

== Exhibitions ==
The gallery became known as a pioneer of group and solo shows of recent art school graduates, including graduates of the nearby Royal College of Art, as well as artists from the British Commonwealth and established Polish émigré artists. Grabowski was aided by art specialists from Poland, including the leading British Polish-born curator and critic Jasia Reichardt and the artist Stanisław Frenkiel. Exhibition themes and titles included Image in Progress, Image in Revolt, Inner Image to MAD - Conroy Maddox and Tomorrow's Artists. Among the exhibitors were:

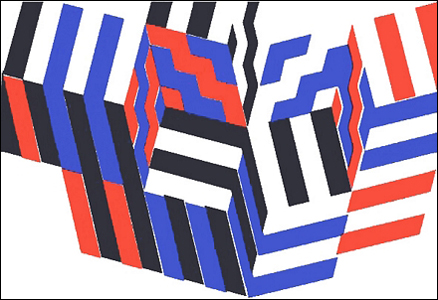
Oliver Bevan Both Ways, 1965

- William Apap
- Anthony Benjamin
- Jan Berdyszak
- Tadek Beutlich
- Oliver Bevan
- Derek Boshier
- Petar Hadzi Boskov
- Pauline Boty
- Frank Bowling
- Caziel
- Jozef Czapski
- Pat Douthwaite
- Olga Edwardes
- Wojciech Fangor
- Stanisław Frenkiel
- Jules de Goede
- Andrzej Grabowski
- Maggi Hambling
- David Hockney
- Tess Jaray
- Allen Jones
- Conroy Maddox
- Victor Newsome
- Robert O'Brian
- Peter Phillips
- Lucy Raverat
- Bridget Riley
- David Saunders
- Magda Sawicka
- Jeffrey Steele
- Peter Struycken
- Keith Sutton
- Suzan Swale
- Norman Toynton
- Alan Uglow
- Marc Vaux
- Aubrey Williams

Several of the gallery's exhibition catalogues from 1959 onwards are in the Special Collections of Leeds University Library, including catalogues for exhibitions by Ivor Abrahams, Michael Sandle and Michael Rothenstein. The Grabowski was one of several noted contemporary art exhibition spaces initiated by émigré Poles in London. Others were Halima Nałęcz's Drian Galleries in Bayswater, Jan Wieliczko's Centaur Gallery and, longest established, Feliks Topolski's studio and exhibition in Waterloo.
