= Petar Hadži Boškov =

Macedonian sculptor

Petar Hadzi Boskov (Skopje, 1 June 1928 – Skopje, 22 March 2015) was a Macedonian sculptor.

== Education and career ==
In 1953, he graduated from the Academy of Fine Arts in Ljubljana under the tutelage of the sculptors Boris Kalin (1905–75) and Zdenko Kalin (b 1911). After that, he returned to Skopje and exhibited sculptures, prints and drawings conceived according to his mentors' poetic interpretation of French Expressionist sculpture. By the end of the 1950s, he was invited to study at the Royal College of Art in London under the British Council postgraduate scholarship programme. His UK stay was so prolific that a year later, in 1960, Henry Moore himself opened Petar's solo exhibition at the Grabowski Gallery in London. This was the first showcasing of Macedonian sculpture in the UK. In 1960, he joined the group Mugri in Skopje and started his series of Masks (1961-3), crafted from welded scrap-metal sheets. From the mid-1960s the influence of Lynn Chadwick and Kenneth Armitage was superseded by that of Minimalism. During the 1970s Hadji Boskov sculpted the granite monument to Kliment Ohridski in Skopje (1972) and the monument to the Fallen Combatants (1977) in Ravne na Koroskem in Slovenia. In this period, he produced tall, mineral-like objects in polished metal, as well as massive clay blocks with richly faceted planes glazed in vivid colors. From 1980 to 1993, he was a professor at the Academy of Fine Arts in Skopje. In 2004, Boskov creates a monument, in memorial, which shows various phases of the life and works of Panko Brashnar, a great Macedonian revolutionary. At its regular assembly in May 2009, Macedonian Academy of Sciences and Arts (MANU) elected Boskov as one of its new members. In 2010, National Gallery of Macedonia, Skopje hosted an exhibition with more than 150 of his sculptures, many of which had not been seen by the public.

== Accomplishments ==
He is an honorary member of the Macedonian Academy of Sciences and Arts and is considered to hold a prominent place in the development and avant-garde changes in the artistic thought in Macedonian modern art.

== See also ==
- Macedonian culture
