= Henry Chaney =

British sports shooter

Personal information
- Born: 5 August 1882 Bermondsey, London, England
- Died: 27 February 1919 (aged 36) West Kensington, London, England
- Resting place: North Sheen Cemetery

Sport
- Sport: Sports shooting

Henry Edward Chaney OBE (5 August 1882 – 27 February 1919) was a British sports shooter. and inventor of the first practical gun camera

== Sports Shooting ==
He competed in the 300 metre free rifle event at the 1908 Summer Olympics. He ranked 40th.

== RFC ==
Henry joined the Lancashire Fusiliers as a private soldier at 16 in 1898. He was promoted to sergeant in 1899, sergeant instructor in 1904, sergeant major instructor in 1907 and Quartermaster Sergeant instructor in 1909.

From this, he became involved in arms development work, particularly with the Lewis gun. Chaney was also involved with the creation of the first "Gunbus".

Over the years, Chaney had accumulated a good deal of experience with cameras and photographic equipment as well as machine guns and began to experiment with combining the two. His first successful gun camera consisted of a standard Lewis gun, to which a box camera had been bolted alongside the barrel. Further development led to the Hythe Gun Camera Mk 111, in which the camera body was incorporated into the barrel. The camera was cocked by using the Lewis gun’s cocking handle and tripped the shutter through an internal linkage to the gun’s trigger. The gun camera now looked, balanced, and behaved much like a proper Lewis gun. Its design was approved, and production was authorized by the War Office.

In the First World War, Chaney transferred to the Royal Flying Corps. He was officer in charge of its gunnery training, then served on flying missions in France before returning to take part in the air defence of London.

He was awarded a 1918 New Year Honours (OBE) by King George V. He also was twice mentioned in despatches for his services during the War.

== Death ==
Chaney was found dead in his rented flat at Baron’s Court, London, in 1919. It transpired that he had shot and wounded his mother, who was staying with him at the time, before turning the gun on himself and firing a single shot into his left temple. The coroner recorded a verdict of “Suicide during temporary insanity”. At the time of his death, Chaney, who had risen to Major in the Royal Air Force, and was then serving at the Air Ministry, was penning a book about his life as a flying officer during World War I. There were reports about him living with a younger woman at the Baron’s Court address, while his wife, Elizabeth Mary Chaney, and seven children were living away in the country at Wokingham, near Reading. He is buried in North Sheen Cemetery.
