= Stanisław Frenkiel =

Polish painter (1918–2001)

Stanisław Frenkiel RWA (14 September 1918 in Kraków – 21 June 2001 in London) was a Polish expressionist painter, graphic artist, art historian, teacher, academic and writer.

== Life ==
He was born in the family of Arnold Frenkiel and his wife Bronisława. His mother brought him up as a lone parent after his father fell victim to the Spanish flu pandemic in 1919.

In 1937 he completed his schooling at Kraków's Henryk Sienkiewicz Gimnazjum and entered the Jan Matejko Academy of Fine Arts in the city. His lecturers included Władysław Jarocki, Kazimierz Sichulski, Xawery Dunikowski and Eugeniusz Eibisch. During the summer vacation of 1939 he set off on an art tour of Paris, by way of Berlin where he stopped off to see the exhibition of Degenerate art put on by the Nazi Party. Then in Paris he encountered the work of Moïse Kisling, Jan Wacław Zawadowski, Efraim Mandelbaum, Artur Nacht-Samborski, and in particular Georges Rouault, whose work impressed him greatly.

He made his way back to Kraków in August 1939 to rejoin his fiancé, Anna Leonora Neuman. After several months of German occupation they resolved to flee over the border into Hungary, but failed. On the advice of his lecturer, artist Eugeniusz Eibisch, they relocated to Lwów (now Lviv). There Stanisław Frenkiel was arrested by the NKVD for refusing to accept Soviet citizenship and was deported to a camp in Suhobesodnoye near Nizhny Novgorod. He survived the privations of the camp partly due to his sketching the guards in their uniforms. At the end of that year an amnesty enabled him to leave the labour camp and he made his way to Tomsk, having heard that his fiancé Anna, had been deported to Yakuts on the Sea of Okhotsk. There he found out she had been taken south and he managed to get to Almaty. Thanks to the Union of Kazakh Artists he obtained work as portrait painter to the local political cadre. Not ceasing from his search for Anna he discovered she was now in Fergana in Uzbekistan. Having arrived there, he came across her by chance in a street as she queued for bread. Together again, they were next deported to Khirgistan where they succumbed to typhus. Having recovered they married in 1942 in the large village of Kurshab.

He managed to join general Anders' Polish forces being mobilised at that time in Soviet Russia and crossed the Caspian Sea from Turkmenbasi into Iran. His new wife was meanwhile marching behind the troops with the civilian deportees and they met up again in Tehran. From there in 1943 he was moved to Iraq and the Palestinian Mandate where he underwent officer training. In preparation for the Italian campaign, he was sent to Egypt. Owing to Stalin's opposition the operation was called off and he remained in Egypt until the end of World War II. At war's end he was able to travel to Beirut where his wife had gained a place to study medicine at the American University of Beirut. Here, he received the news from his aunt, who gad survived the war, that his mother Bronislawa and his stepfather Benjamin (Juma) had been shot dead in Zakliczyn, a small town in Southern Poland.

He took up a place to study Fine Art at the Lebanese Academy of Fine Arts in November 1945 and completed the course two years later. He developed his own style drawing on local colour and street life and began exhibiting there while participating in the intellectual life of the Polish émigré community, co-founding two reviews, Pion and Dziurka od klucza. In 1947 the British authorities announced that Poles who had served in the Allied Forces could choose either to return to Poland or to go to the United Kingdom. Arriving in Britain, he was posted to a camp in Staffordshire. In January 1948 he was joined there by his wife and Beirut-born baby son, Andrew, followed by demobilisation from the army.

He began his British career with further studies at the Sir John Cass College of Art. On completion he set up the first art department at the London Jesuit-run grammar school, Wimbledon College. Later he taught art education at Gipsy Hill Collegebefore moving to lead the art department at the University of London, Institute of Education . After a post-graduate degree in the History of Art from the Courtauld Institute of Art he rose to be head of Art at the Institute of Education and finally Reader in Art at UCL. His prolific artistic output, including printmaking, continued alongside his academic work and free-lance writing and art criticism in the Polish language émigré press. He exhibited widely in the UK and abroad, beginning at the trend-setting Grabowski Gallery in Chelsea, for whom he also wrote exhibition notes for other artists. He was a founding member in 1957 of the Association of Polish Artists in Great Britain.

In 1994 Krakow Academy of Fine Arts conferred on Frenkiel the distinction of Doctor honoris causa. In 1997 the President of the Republic of Poland awarded him the Polish Army Cross for Polish forces in the West.

He died on 17 June 2001 in London and was buried at Putney Vale cemetery.

== Legacy ==
Frenkiel's substantial body of artistic and written work was deposited at the Nicolaus Copernicus University in Toruń Émigré Archives by his daughter, Oleńka Frenkiel, the award-winning BBC investigative journalist in 2009.

=== Documentation ===
In Polish:

- Ker., Plastycy polscy w Galerii Grabowskiego, „Oblicze Tygodnia” 1959 nr 22(82), s. 6.
- (mc), Rozmowy plastyków, „Orzeł Biały-Syrena” 1959 nr 17, s. 6.
- (k.), Nowa wystawa w Galerii Grabowskiego, „Oblicze Tygodnia. Dodatek Ilustrowany”, 1960 nr 78, s. b-c.
- D. Step, Wyłącznie dramat, „Merkuriusz Polski – Życie Akademickie – Młoda Sztuka”, 1960 nr 4–5(119–120), s. 15.
- (z), Z wystawy abstrakcjonistów, „Orzeł Biały” 1960 nr 14.
- I wystawa malarstwa i grafiki Grupy „Krąg”, Ekspozycja Klub ZPAP, Poznań, Pl. Wolności 4 [folder]. Poznań 1961.
- M. Bohusz-Szyszko, Doroczna wystawa Zrzeszenia Plastyków Polskich w Wielkiej Brytanii w Galerii Grabowskiego w Londynie (8.XI–31.XII.1961), „Merkuriusz Polski – Życie Akademickie – Młoda Sztuka”, 1961 nr 11–12, s. 10–11.
- W. M., Wystawa „Kręgu” w Londynie, „Merkuriusz Polski – Życie Akademickie – Młoda Sztuka”, 1963 nr 3–4(153–154), s. 7.
- IV wystawa malarstwa i grafiki Grupy „Krąg”. Kraków, Pałac Sztuki, sierpień 1963 [katalog], Kraków 1963.
- J. Z. Kędzierski, „Dwa światy”, „Wiadomości” 1964 nr 12(938), s. 3.
- T. Karren, „Dwa światy” w Galerii Grabowskiego, „Tydzień Polski” 1964 nr 4, s. 6–7.
- Wystawa prac artystów polskich z Londynu: Janiny Baranowskiej, Stanisława Frenkla, Marka Łączyńskiego, 1965 [katalog wystawy], Kraków 1965.
- M. Bohusz-Szyszko, Malarstwo Stanisława Frenkla, „Wiadomości” 1965 nr 37/38 (1015/1016), s. 5.
- Z. Turkiewicz, Wystawy londyńskie, „Kultura” 1965 nr 4(210), s. 125–133.
- M. Bohusz-Szyszko, O polskich plastykach — bez taryfy ulgowej, „Tydzień Polski” 1967 nr 10, s. 6–7.
- M. Bohusz-Szyszko, Malarstwo Stanisława Frenkla, „Wiadomości” 1971 nr 1(1292), s. 3.
- M. Bohusz-Szyszko, O sztuce Stanisława Frenkla, „Wiadomości” 1974 nr 8(1457), s. 4.
- M. Bohusz-Szyszko, O sztuce, Londyn 1982.
- A. M. Borkowski, Wystawa „Jesteśmy” w Polskim Instytucie Kultury w Londynie, „Dziennik Polski i Dziennik Żołnierza”, 24.02.1992, s. 6–7.
- A. M. Borkowski, Erotomachia — Stanisława Frenkla, „Dziennik Polski i Dziennik Żołnierza”, 2.12.1992, s. 6.
- K. Nowosielski, Wymagająca swoboda Stanisława Frenkla, „Topos” 1994 nr 1–2(9–10), s. 29–31.
- A. M. Borkowski, Czworo poważnych malarzy, „Tydzień Polski” 1996 nr 28, s. 11.
- J. Koźmiński, Ja się nie bałem, „Archiwum Emigracji. Studia – Szkice – Dokumenty” 1998 z. 1, s. 154–159.
- M. A. Supruniuk, J. Krasnodębska, Mała Galeria Sztuki Emigracyjnej ze zbiorów Archiwum Emigracji, Toruń 2002.
- J. W. Sienkiewicz, Polskie galerie sztuki w Londynie w drugiej połowie XX wieku, Lublin 2003.
- M. A. Supruniuk, „Trwałość i płynność”. Sztuka polska w Wielkiej Brytanii w XX wieku — wstęp do opisu, „Archiwum Emigracji. Studia – Szkice – Dokumenty” 2006 z. 1–2(7–8), s. 127–159.
- M. A. Supruniuk, Sztuka polska w Wielkiej Brytanii w latach 1940–2000. Antologia, wybrał, Toruń 2006.
- J. W. Sienkiewicz, Galeria Sztuki Emigracyjnej w Toruniu jako atrakcja turystyczna regionu, [w:] Turystyka i rekreacja jako czynnik podnoszenia atrakcyjności i kon¬kurencyjności regionu, red. D. Dudkiewicz, F. Midura, E. Wysocka, Warszawa 2006, s. 275–283.
- J. W. Sienkiewicz, „Dwa światy” — jedna sztuka. Pomiędzy PRL-em a niezłomnym Londynem w Galerii Mateusza Grabowskiego (1959–1975), [w:] Bariery kulturowe w turystyce, pod red. Z. Krawczyka, E. Lewandowskiej-Tarasiuk, J. W. Sienkiewicza, Warszawa 2007, s. 205–215.
- J. W. Sienkiewicz, Polscy artyści na Wyspach Brytyjskich. Polska sztuka religijna po II wojnie światowej. Zarys problematyki, [w:] Gaudium in litteris, pod red. S. Janeczka, W. Bajor, M. Maciołka, Lublin 2009, s. 803–818.
- J. W. Sienkiewicz, Polskie galerie sztuki w Londynie w oczach brytyjskiej i polskiej krytyki artystycznej, [w:] Dzieje krytyki artystycznej i myśli o sztuce. Materiały z konferencji naukowej, Toruń 13–15 czerwca 2007, pod red. M. Geron, J. Malinowskiego, Warszawa 2009, s. 371–388.
- J. W. Sienkiewicz, Artyści polscy na obczyźnie. Z badań nad XX-wieczną sztuką polską poza krajem, [w:] Wkład wychodźstwa polskiego w naukę i kulturę Wielkiej Brytanii, Kraków 2010, s. 59–74.
- J. W. Sienkiewicz, Królewski dar dla Muzeum Uniwersyteckiego, Głos Uczelni 2010 nr 11, s. 20–21.
- J. W. Sienkiewicz, Pół wieku (po)za granicami polskiej kultury i sztuki. Polscy artyści w Wielkiej Brytanii 1939–1989. Stan badań, [w:] Granice w kulturze, pod red. A. Radomskiego, R. Bomby, Lublin 2010, s. 246–257.

In English:

- A. Dyson, Stanisław Frenkiel: Beirut Drawings 1944-47 (The Boushra Fakhoury Collection), [b.m.] 1986.
- A. Dyson, Passion and Paradox: The Art of Stanisław Frenkiel, London 2001.
- J. W. Sienkiewicz, "Multicultural context of Polish Art Galleries in London in the second half of the 20th Century", in "Multiculturalism at the Start of 21st Century: The British-Polish Experience". Australian Theory and Practice. International Conference, ed. K. Kujawska Courtney and M. A. Łukowska, Łódź 2007, p. 347–357.
