= Vivian Davies =

English rugby union player

Vivian Gordon Davies (22 January 1899 – 23 December 1941) was an English rugby union player. He won two caps for England, the first at fly-half in the 1922 Five Nations Championship loss away to Wales at the National Stadium in 1922, and the latter at centre in another loss to the touring New Zealanders at Twickenham in 1925.

During the Second World War he was a captain in the Royal Artillery, and died during the war in 1941 aged 42. He was cremated at Mortlake Crematorium and his name is listed on a screen wall memorial erected by the Commonwealth War Graves Commission in the adjoining Mortlake Cemetery.
