= Sloane Avenue Mansions =

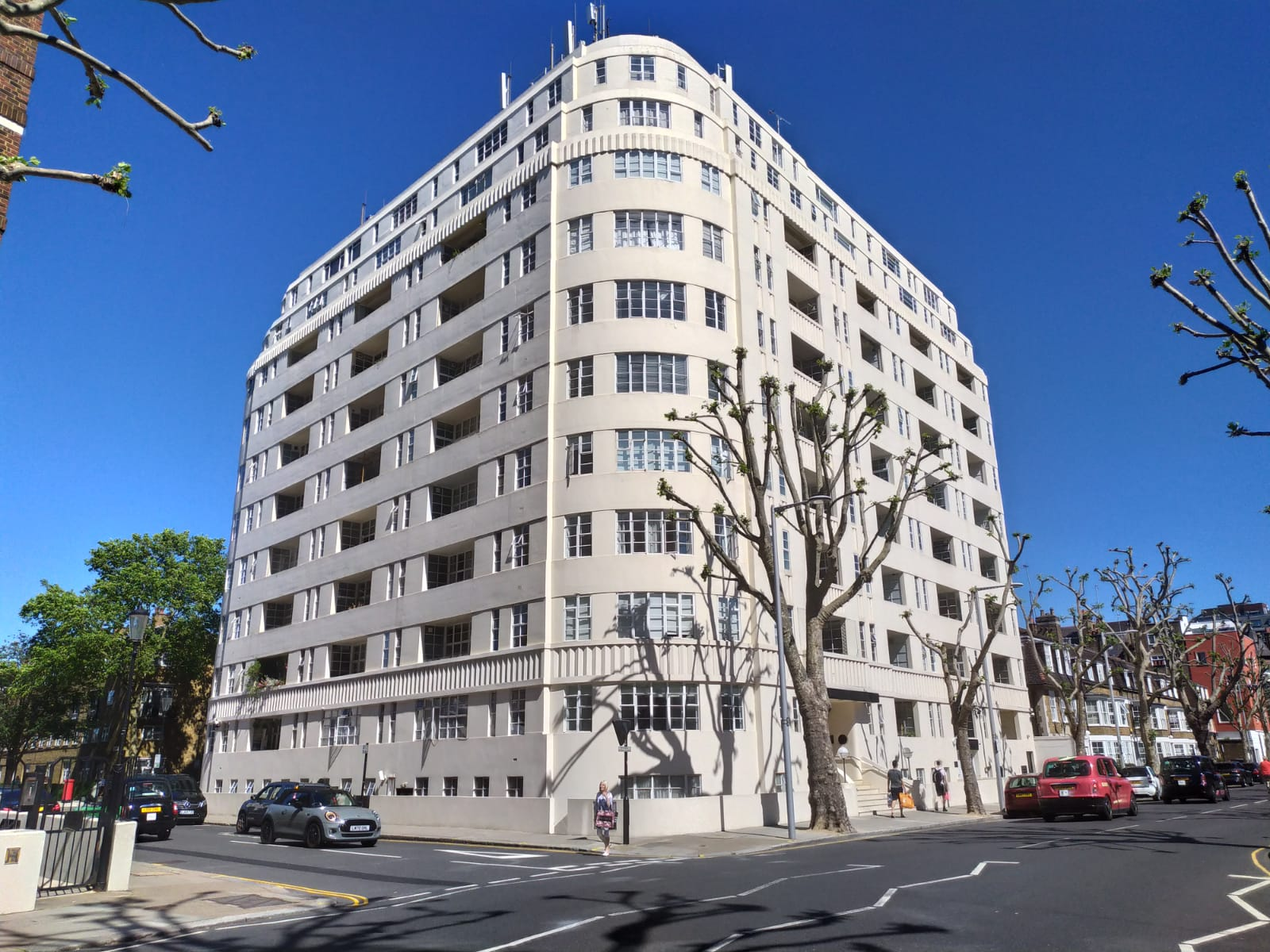
- Sloane Avenue Mansions, view from Sloane Avenue
- Interactive map of the Sloane Avenue Mansions area

General information
- Type: Residential buildings
- Architectural style: Art Deco architecture
- Location: Sloane Avenue, Chelsea, London, United Kingdom
- Coordinates: 51.4918°N 0.1641°W
- Construction started: 1931
- Completed: 1933

Design and construction
- Architect: G. Kay Green

Sloane Avenue Mansions is a high-rise residential building in Sloane Avenue, Chelsea, London, England. It stands next to Nell Gwynn House, designed by the same architect, G. Kay Green.

== History ==
At the beginning of the 20th century, the area comprised derelict houses. By the 1930s, the area was revitalized, by tearing down those houses and erecting new buildings.

Its construction began in 1931, and it was completed in 1933. It was designed in the Art Deco architectural style by G. Kay Green. It is 35 metres high, with 11 storeys.

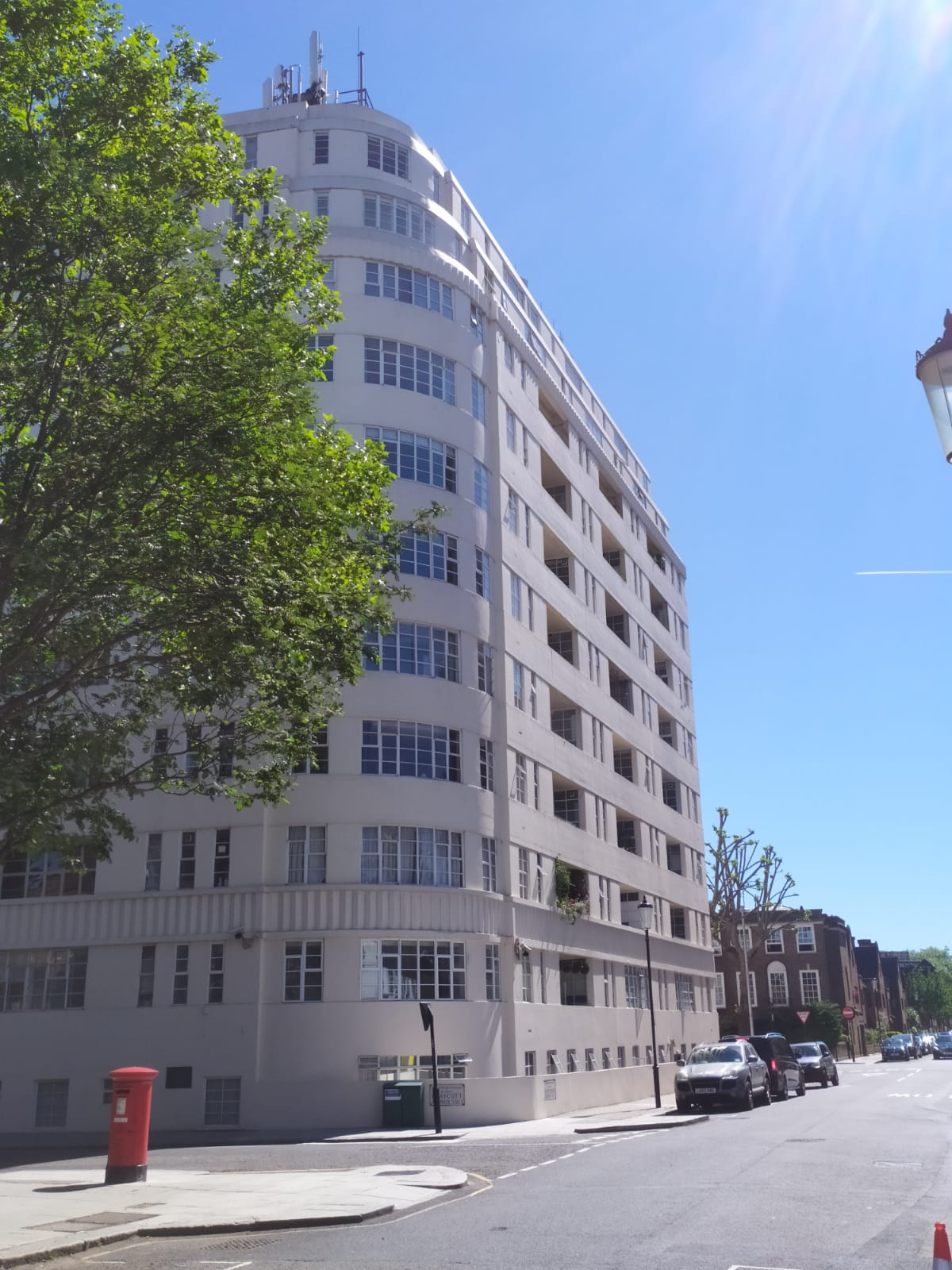
Side view of Sloane Avenue Mansions from Whitehead's Grove
