= Walpole Street =

Street in Chelsea, London

Coordinates: 51.48985°N 0.16091°W

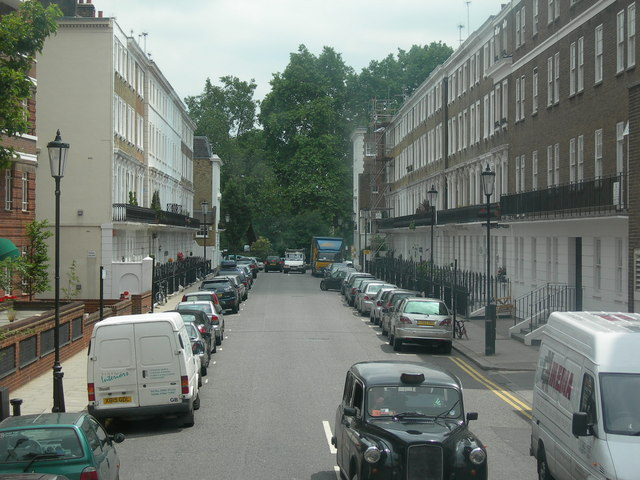
Walpole Street from King's Road, 2006

Walpole Street is a street in Chelsea, London, running north-west to south-east from King's Road to St Leonard's Terrace and Burton's Court.

The MacDonald sisters lived at no 33 in the 1850s.

In 1936, the Scottish architect G. Kay Green (1877–1939) was living at no.1. The actress Susannah York was born at no 18 in 1939.
