= Mateusz Grabowski =

Polish-British pharmacist

Mateusz Bronisław Grabowski, known as Grabowski or M.B. Grabowski (15 July 1904 - 16 December 1976), was a Polish-British pharmacist, art collector, and philanthropist known for owning the Grabowski Gallery in Chelsea, London. His M.B. Grabowski Foundation has endowed Polish Migration and Polish Cultural History studies at University College London, the University of Stirling, the University of Cambridge, and Trinity College, Oxford. He donated his pharmaceutical and art collections to several museums in Poland.

== Life ==
Mateusz Grabowski was one of three children born to Wojciech and Marianna Grabowski in Wizna near Łomża in the Podlasie Governorate, Congress Poland. As a young man he was involved in the Polish Scouting movement.

He graduated as a Master of Pharmacy at Stefan Batory University in Wilno. His first post was alongside his pharmacist uncle in Piotrków Trybunalski. In 1930 he moved to Warsaw where he married, had two sons and rose to the role of government inspector of pharmacies. With the probability of war increasing in the late 1930s he joined the army reserve and became a member of the Polish Army Medical Corps. He subsequently organised the pharmacy services of the army. During World War II, he escaped from Poland and sought refuge first in France and after its fall in 1940, in the United Kingdom. His family were left behind in Warsaw where his older son, Wojciech, ps "oko", participated in the Warsaw Uprising. Although they survived the war, his wife died in the aftermath. Grabowski was able to bring out his two young sons to join him in London.

After the war in London he set up a small network of pharmacies in Earl's Court and Chelsea and started one of the first mail order chemists in England. He specialised in sending pharmaceutical products to war-ravaged Poland. In 1959 he opened the Grabowski Gallery next to his chemist shop in Sloane Avenue, Chelsea. The gallery specialised in promoting young and diaspora artists, among whom were Pauline Boty, David Hockney and Bridget Riley. It was a non-commercial venture. Rather it was an expression of his passion for art. The gallery held its final show in 1975 before closing.

Grabowski's younger son, Andrzej, an artist, predeceased him in 1969. His other son, Wojciech, also a pharmacist, took over the family business after Grabowski died in London in 1976. Grabowski was buried at North Sheen Cemetery, London.

Grabowski's granddaughter, Mareva Grabowski-Mitsotakis, is married to the Greek prime minister (since July 2019), Kyriakos Mitsotakis.
