= Nell Gwynn House =

Coordinates: 51.4922°N 0.1650°W

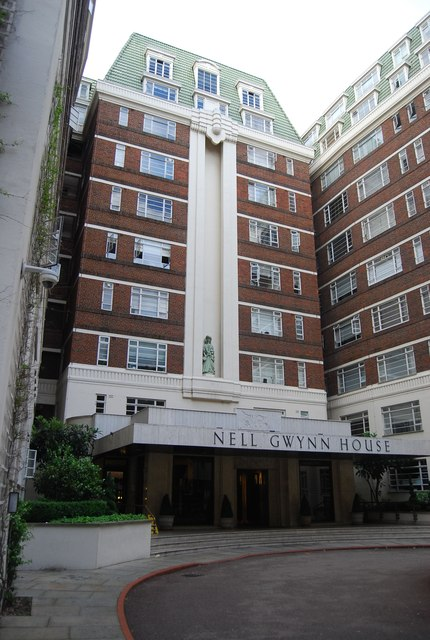
- Interactive map of the Nell Gwynn House area

General information
- Type: Residential buildings
- Architectural style: Art Deco
- Location: Sloane Avenue, Chelsea, London, United Kingdom
- Construction started: 1936
- Completed: 1937

Design and construction
- Architect: G. Kay Green

Nell Gwynn House is a ten-storey residential building in Sloane Avenue, Chelsea, London, designed in the Art Deco style by G. Kay Green. Completed in 1937, it stands next to the same architect's Sloane Avenue Mansions, built a few years earlier.

== History ==
In the 1840s, there was a house on the site of Nell Gwynn House in which the member of parliament George Thompson lived. A blue plaque added to the side of the present building in 2013 commemorates Thompson being visited there in 1846 by the notable American Frederick Douglass.

At the beginning of the 20th century, this area of Chelsea contained run-down or derelict housing, and by the 1930s the area was being redeveloped. The Victoria County History notes that by the end of the decade the district was "filled with housing for the better off, a curious mixture of select, consciously picturesque low houses and enormous and forbidding blocks of flats, either cautiously Art Deco or approximately neoGeorgian in style." It continues:

On the east side of Sloane Avenue several semi-detached houses were built and two immense ten-storeyed blocks of flats on either side of Whitehead's Grove with second frontages to Draycott Avenue: on the south corner Sloane Avenue Mansions was completed in 1933, and on the north corner the larger Nell Gwynne House, faced with red brick and with a spacious open courtyard in the centre forming the main entrance, was finished in 1937. Both had parking space in the basements, and Nell Gwynn House had a restaurant open to non-residents.

With a footprint forming a giant capital W, the building's geometric design is mostly Art Deco, but making use of Egyptian, Aztec, and Mayan patterns and materials. From the outset, each apartment had built-in central heating, there was a restaurant in the basement, a hairdressing salon, and a bar in the lobby.

In 1937, Country Life carried an advertisement -

"NOT HAVE A DISTINCTIVE FLAT IN TOWN? The Supreme choice : NELL GWYNN HOUSE CHELSEA'S SMARTEST BUILDING Inclusive Rentals £90 to £190 per annum Nell Gwynn House offers beautifully designed and decorated single-roomed and two-roomed flats, each with their own private bathroom, kitchenette and up-to-date conveniences for luxurious comfort. Magnificent Restaurant - Ballroom for 200 Patrons. Cocktail and Snack Bar which are definitely unique. Perfect service: well trained staff."

In 1948, a music club was established, with Sir Adrian Boult as President, and was patronised by Vaughan Williams, Arnold Bax, and John Ireland.

In 1966, A. G. Ogden described Nell Gwynn House as a "pied a terre for many Chelsea bachelors who honor the spirit of Charles II. In 1967, three Scandinavian newspapers were using apartment 337 as their London contact address, joined by two others in 1971.

Since 2006, the Trustees of the building have undertaken multiple major refurbishment works, both inside and out, including the renovation of more than half of the apartments and the restoration of the Art-Deco features in the reception front driveway and public areas, by renowned designer Tim Gosling.

== Management company and freehold ==
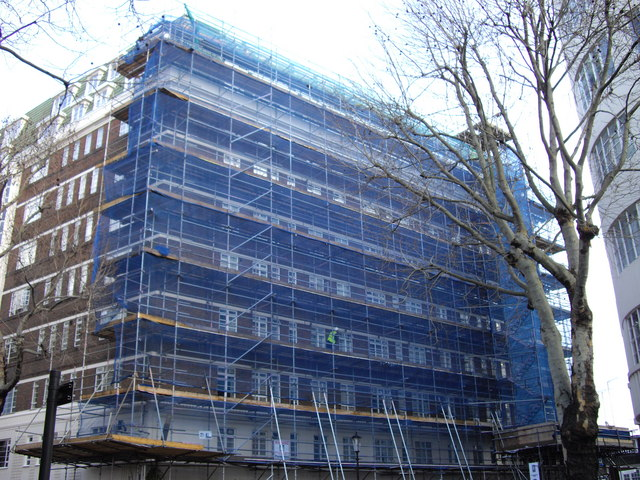
Scaffolding in place for renovation work in 2009

On 29 September 1937, the Central London Property Trust Ltd granted a lease of the whole block of flats to Nell Gwynn House (Chelsea) Ltd for ninety-nine years at a rent of £7,000 a year, and on the same day the company borrowed £225,000 from Land Charges Ltd, mortgaging its lease.

In 1946, under the new Labour government's Rent Control Act, the Chelsea, Holborn, and Westminster Rent Tribunal was asked by tenants to assess the fair rent of two flats in Nell Gwynn House. The landlord had wanted to increase the rent to £5 5s a week, but the Tribunal imposed rents of £4-1s-6d and £4-2s-6d in the two cases. The landlord was Nell Gwynn Furnished Flats Ltd., which then controlled seventy-nine unfurnished flats in the building, out of a total of 437 self-contained flats.

In a taxation case in the High Court in 1966, Mr Justice Megarry concluded: “I am certainly unable to say that, as a matter of law, the Special Commissioners were wrong in being unable in these circumstances to find in Nell Gwynn House sufficient of the qualities of an investment to enable them to say that it was indeed an investment.”

In 2010, NGH Freehold Ltd, a management company representing about three-quarters of the lessees, bought the freehold (see collective enfranchisement) which lowered the cost for the lessees of licences to make any major alterations or other works. At the time of the sale to NGH Freehold Ltd, this was the largest UK collective enfranchisement.

In 2020, a fifth-floor one-bedroom flat was for sale with a 999-year lease expiring in 3009. With a size of 316 square feet, it had an annual service charge of £3854 and council tax of £1237. The front door entered a living room (with a small kitchen in one corner) fifteen by thirteen and a half feet. Opening off that was a bedroom ten feet by eight and a half, and a small bathroom. The asking price was £590,000.

== Statue and alcove ==
Above the main entrance, at the level of the 2nd floor, is Nell Gwynn's statue, with a Cavalier King Charles Spaniel at her feet. This stands at the foot of an alcove six storeys high, topped by an art deco set of reliefs, and is hard to see from Sloane Avenue, so is mostly unnoticed by the traffic, but it is believed to be the only statue of a royal mistress anywhere in the capital city.

== Notable residents ==
- Frank Foley (1884–1958), Secret Intelligence Service officer who helped many Jewish families to escape from Germany in the 1930s
- Daisy Burrell (1892–1982), actress of the silent film era, lived in flat 203 as Daisy Young
- Vera Atkins (1908–2000), Romanian-born Intelligence Officer of the Second World War occupied Flat 725 between 1940 and 1950. In 2022 a plaque commemorating her work was installed by the American Jewish Historical Society on the Whiteheads Grove elevation of the building
- Theyre Lee-Elliott (1903–1988), artist, designer of the BOAC Speedbird
- Samuel Hughes (1913–2002), Canadian field historian, during Second World War
- Diana Dors (1931–1984) English film actress and singer
- Roy James aka "The Weasel" (1935–1997), one of the Great Train robbers, was living in flat 907 at the time of the robbery in 1963
- Indira Devi of Kapurthala (1912-1979), Lived in flat 512 in the late 1930s-early 1940s.
- Bruce Forsyth (1928–2017), entertainer occupied Flat 828 until 2000
- Tina Moore (1942- ), first wife of footballer Bobby Moore is currently a resident in the building
- Alan Merrill (1951–2020) American rock singer and songwriter, wrote the song I Love Rock 'n' Roll while living in Flat 337 Nell Gwynn House in 1975

In February 2013, a blue plaque was unveiled by Barbara J. Stephenson, the deputy chief of mission at the United States Embassy in London, in honour of the social reformer and abolitionist Frederick Douglass. It is located on the Whiteheads Grove elevation of the block, standing on the site of the London house of the British abolitionist George Thompson, with whom Douglass stayed in 1846, while lecturing in London.
