= Mortlake Cemetery =

Cemetery in west London

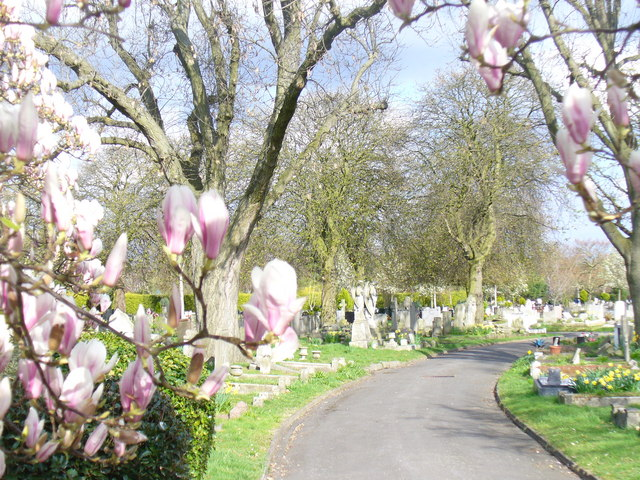
- Interactive map of Mortlake Cemetery

Details
- Established: 1926
- Location: Clifford Avenue and Lower Mortlake Road, Kew, London
- Coordinates: 51.47109°N 0.27524°W
- Type: Active
- Owned by: Hammersmith and Fulham Council
- Website: London Borough of Hammersmith and Fulham cemeteries
- Find a Grave: Mortlake Cemetery

Mortlake Cemetery is a cemetery in Kew in the London Borough of Richmond upon Thames (historically in North Sheen, Surrey). It is also known as Hammersmith New Cemetery as it provided burials for the then Metropolitan Borough of Hammersmith when Margravine Cemetery was full. The cemetery opened in 1926 and is still in use. It is now managed by Hammersmith and Fulham Council.

The cemetery is located on Mortlake Road (the A205 or South Circular Road), opposite North Sheen Cemetery. The nearest London Underground station is Kew Gardens.

== War graves ==
The cemetery contains the Commonwealth war graves of 109 service personnel of World War II. Many are buried in private graves but others are in a special services plot in the south-eastern corner of the cemetery. At the latter, the casualties are mainly buried in collective graves holding up to five bodies each due to the limited burial space. The names of those buried in the plot are listed on the CWGC-erected memorial that also lists service personnel of the same war who were cremated at Mortlake Crematorium.

== Mortlake Crematorium ==
Mortlake Crematorium was built next to the cemetery in 1939. Seventy-seven Commonwealth servicemen of World War II who were cremated at the crematorium are listed on a screen wall memorial erected by the Commonwealth War Graves Commission in the cemetery. They include England rugby international Vivian Davies (1899–1941) who was a captain in the Royal Artillery. The memorial is listed Grade II by Historic England.

== Notable burials ==
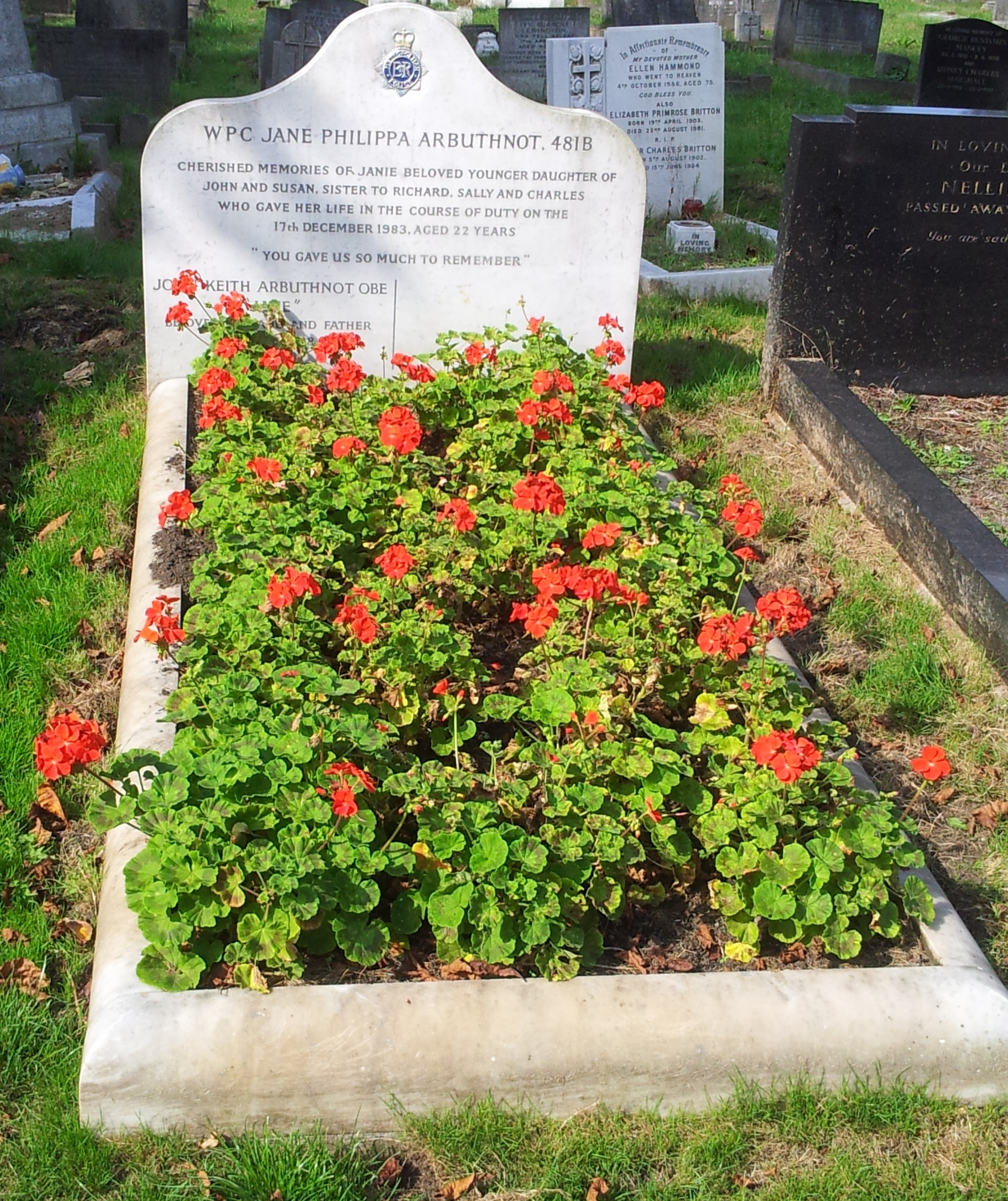
Grave of WPC Jane Philippa Arbuthnot, who was killed in the 1983 Harrods bombing

Among those buried here were:

- Woman Police Constable Jane Philippa Arbuthnot (d.1983), one of three police officers killed by a car bomb that exploded outside Harrods department store in central London on 17 December 1983
- James Collins (d.1934), Secretary of the Australian Government's Department of the Treasury. His signature appeared on Australia's bank notes from 1910 to 1926
- Arthur Haynes (d.1966), TV comedian
- Stephen Ward (d.1963), the society osteopath who was one of the central figures in the Profumo affair and committed suicide
- Carol White (d.1991), actress who received public acclaim for her performance in the 1966 British television play Cathy Come Home

== See also ==
- Margravine Cemetery (Hammersmith Old Cemetery)
- North Sheen Cemetery (Fulham New Cemetery)
- Old Mortlake Burial Ground
