= Robert O'Brien (artist) =

British artist based in Hong Kong (born 1939)

Robert O’Brien (born 1939) is a British artist based in Hong Kong. His works mostly focus on the responses and reflection of the visible world and the relationship of ideas. O’Brien spent his childhood in Congo, Egypt and England. He spent most of his lifetime working in the field of art, including art education. His career began by graduating in Theatre Design from Central St. Martins (the London Institute) in 1961. Then he worked extensively as a part-time lecturer in the Hong Kong Academy for Performing Arts for his art education career. He is now operating a painting studio on Cheung Chau Island in Hong Kong.

O’Brien achieved massive success for his works on exhibition in the gallery. He has hosted fourteen independent exhibitions and fifty-six group shows in Europe and Asia since 1964. His exhibition locations include Hong Kong, Seoul and Tokyo. His works are now on display mostly in public all over the world and under corporation collection with Hong Kong.

== Located in Hong Kong ==
Robert O’Brien stayed in Germany in 1976. He contacted a friend located in Hong Kong and investigated the possibility of visiting China. His friends recommended him to go to Cheung Chau in Hong Kong. Since then he has never moved to another country to stay.

== Painting style ==
Robert O’Brien's art works have been focused on the natural world. “My art over the last 36 years has focused on the tradition of painting and landscape as conceptual mapping of the personal, social and the geographical. All sources have been in the region of south china and focuses on what is predominant within these areas: Stone; Water and Wood. ” His abstract cubist style of the natural landscape usually comprises pieces that can be assembled and reassembled for difference artistic results.

== Exhibitions ==
Robert O’Brien has held 14 solo exhibitions so far, and participated in numerous group exhibitions. In recent years, the exhibitions took place mostly in Asia (Hong Kong, Taiwan, Korea, Thailand and so on…), while in the early stage of his art life. Most exhibitions located in UK. In 1980, O’Brien held his first solo exhibition in Hong Kong which was supported by the British Council. As the artist recalled, during the time, the society was divided in many ways, “The British in one side and the Chinese on the other.” The exhibition, in general, was more of a colonial side to it. It was not until the exhibition “Out of context” in 1987 that O’ Brien started to work with local artist like Yank Wong and Josh Wan.
