= Jules de Goede =

Dutch painter

Jules de Goede (20 May 1937 – 19 September 2007) was a Dutch abstract artist and art lecturer who spent most of his life in Australia and England.

== Early life ==
De Goede was born in Rotterdam, the first of his parents' seven children. His father was a carpenter with French and Dutch ancestry; his mother was a teacher of German descent. In 1939, they moved to Wijchen, a village near Nijmegen to which de Goede's father was posted by the Dutch Army. They remained there through the occupation of the Netherlands by Nazi Germany.

At the age of 14, de Goede gained a diploma in decorative arts from the Nijmegen Technical College with distinction, and a place at the Arnhem Academy of Fine Arts (Academie voor Beeldende Kunsten en Kunstnijverheid), but was two years too young to start. In the meantime, he worked as a silkscreen printer. He studied at the academy when he reached 16, but continued to work in the evenings, taking up a job in a packaging design agency. He also studied for one year at Eindhoven School of Art.

== Move to Australia ==
De Goede's mother died in 1956 after a long illness, and he joined his family in emigrating to Sydney, Australia. Leaving the Netherlands also enabled him to avoid being conscripted into the Dutch Army.

He continued to work in advertising in Australia, and also studied part-time at the Julian Ashton Art School and Desiderius Orban School of Art, and then at the Canberra School of Art (now part of the Australian National University). He exhibited more than 30 times, including three solo exhibitions. Meanwhile, he worked for the Australian News and Information Bureau, and the National Capital Development Commission in Canberra.

== Later career in the UK ==
De Goede developed an interest in abstract art, and moved to London in 1965, taking a flat in Holborn and an art studio at the St Katharine Docks run by Bridget Riley and Peter Sedgley. After a property developer bought the dock, he moved to a large minimalist studio in a former Jewish school in Stepney Green, east London, alongside the studios of Michael Kenny and Bert Irvin. The space taken by de Goede was formerly occupied by sculptor Hubert Dalwood. De Goede was an early pioneer of opening his studio to the public. He joined the London Group in 1996, when he was also a finalist for the Jerwood Prize. He was a founder member of the Movement for a Socialist Future (later merged into A World to Win) in 1999.

De Goede also taught at Hornsey College of Art in north London (now part of Middlesex University) from 1972, later becoming a senior lecturer. He retired in 2003, returning to work as a full-time artist.

De Goede died from cancer in London in 2007. He never married.

== Works ==
De Goede painted mostly abstract works, often large canvases confined to black and white lines and shapes, with visual paradoxes and illusions, but also smaller works: prints, drawings and sculptures. Describing his work, de Goede said, "A reflection of the world like it visually appears is not quite enough ... Abstraction should bring forth another kind of reality. I try to show what is invisible." He joined many exhibitions between 1967 and 2005, with solo exhibitions at the Grabowski Gallery and House Gallery, the Riverside Studios in Hammersmith, the OXO Gallery in South Kensington in 1982, and the Stephen Lawrence Gallery at Greenwich University in 2005. He was also selected by the Arts Council of Great Britain as one of five Dutch artists to exhibit at the Serpentine Gallery. His last exhibition, a solo exhibition entitled "Tracing the Black Hole", was held at the Angus Broadbent Gallery in Bayswater in June 2006, accompanying the publication of a book by Mel Gooding and Corinna Lotz documenting his life.
