= G. Kay Green =

Scottish architect

George Kay Green (3 May 1877 – December 1939) was a Scottish architect whose work after 1918 was mostly in southern England.

== Life ==
Born in May 1877, Green was educated at George Watson's College, Edinburgh, and was active in business in Edinburgh from at least 1897, when he went into partnership there with William H. McLachlan. While no trace of Green's formal training as an architect has come to light, in 1899 he submitted designs for a new Upper Hall at the Signet Library, and was described as "George Kay Green, Architect". He was then of 42, Blacket Place, Edinburgh. A drawing by Green of the Laigh Hall, Edinburgh, appeared in the 1902 volume of the journal Judicial Review. Green was in Edinburgh in 1909, when he wrote from there to The Berwick Advertiser on the subject of farming in the Borders.

During the First World War, he served as a quartermaster sergeant in the Royal Engineers and then was commissioned as a second lieutenant into the Royal Army Service Corps. In 1920, he was living at 1, Walpole St, London S.W.3.

In 1927, Green was a director of Peacehaven Estates Ltd, Peacehaven Hotel Company Ltd, Peacehaven Water Company Ltd, and Peacehaven Electric Light Company Ltd., which had an address at South Coast Road, Peacehaven, Sussex. In 1928 the companies also had an office at 7, Pall Mall, Westminster, and the directors were Lord Teynham (chairman), C. W. Neville (managing director), and Green. Peacehaven was a large self-build development described in 1940 as "a holiday resort or bungalow-town... founded at the end of the War of 1914–18. It lies at the edge of the cliffs, its plan being a grid of unmade roads".

In London, Green began to specialize in designing large apartment blocks. He was the architect of Sloane Avenue Mansions, an 11-storey Art Deco residential building in Chelsea, London, built between 1931 and 1933. Another such building he designed was Du Cane Court, Balham High Road, Balham, an early example of an apartment block with revolving doors, the largest block of flats in Great Britain when it was completed in 1934. Perhaps his final major building was Nell Gwynn House in Sloane Avenue, Chelsea, which was finished in 1937. The footprint of the building forms a capital W, and it makes use of Cubist geometric designs, with ancient Egyptian, Aztec, and Mayan patterns.

== Private life ==
In May 1930, at Brighton, Green married Edna Kathleen Hiscock, the 27-year-old daughter of a builder, Herbert Woodbridge Hiscock, and his wife Eleanor. In 1935, they were living at 241, Richmond Road, Twickenham, and the next year at 1, Walpole Street, Chelsea. In September 1936, they announced the birth of a son, Charles. The Post Office Directory for 1938 has Green listed at 8, Orange Street, Haymarket, Westminster W.C.2. In October 1939, the family of three was back in Twickenham, and Green died a few weeks later.

When Green's widow died in 1993, her death was registered as Edna Kathleen Green or Kay-Green.
