= Nicholas Wadley =

British art critic, art historian, biographer, cartoonist and illustrator

Nicholas Wadley (30 April 1935 – 1 November 2017) was a British art critic, art historian, biographer, cartoonist and illustrator.

== Biography ==
He was born in Elstree, Hertfordshire, the youngest child of Kitty, an administrator at the Bank of England, and Wilfred Wadley, an accountant for the Royal Air Force (RAF). He was educated at Reed's School, in Cobham, Surrey, and graduated in fine art at Kingston School of Art in 1956. He did National Service in the RAF, and graduated in art history at the Courtauld Institute in London in 1961.

From 1962 to 1985 he taught at Chelsea School of Art, as head of art history after 1970, and took early retirement in 1985. He was a friend of Stefan and Franciszka Themerson and an admirer of their work, on which he wrote extensively.

With his first wife, Pauline, he had two children, Caroline and Chris. He later married Franciszka Themerson's niece, Jasia Reichardt.

After his retirement, Wadley became an illustrator and published many cartoons and drawings

== Books ==
- Michelangelo (1965)
- Manet (1967)
- The Drawings of Van Gogh (1969)
- Cubism (1972)
- Cézanne and His Art (1975)
- Gauguin (1978)
- Noa Noa, Gauguin's Tahiti (1985)
- Impressionist & Post-Impressionist Drawing (1991)

== Illustrated books ==
- Nick Wadley’s Guide to British Artists (2003)
- Man + Dog (2009)
- Man + Doctor (2012)
- Blue Owl (2014)
- Man + Table (2016)
- Man + Book (2018)

== Exhibition catalogues ==
- Modern British Watercolours (1964)
- Jacques Lipchitz, Sculptures and Drawings (1973)
- Seymour Lipton, Recent Work (1974)
- Henri Matisse (1978)
- Jacques Lipchitz, Sculptures and Drawings from the Cubist Epoch (1978)
- Barbara Hepworth. Carvings and Bronzes (1979)
- Rufino Tamayo (1979)
- John Davies, Recent Sculpture and Drawings (1980)
- Kurt Schwitters in Exile, the Latev Work 1937-48 (1981)
- Gwyther Irwin, A Retrospective (1987)
- Renoir: a retrospective (1987)
- The Drawings of Franciszka Themerson (1991)
