= Themerson =

Themerson is a surname. Notable people with the surname include:

- Franciszka Themerson (1907–1988), British painter, illustrator, filmmaker, and stage designer
- Stefan Themerson (1910–1988), British poet, novelist, filmmaker, composer, and philosopher
