= Manuel Chaves Nogales =

Spanish writer and journalist (1897–1944)

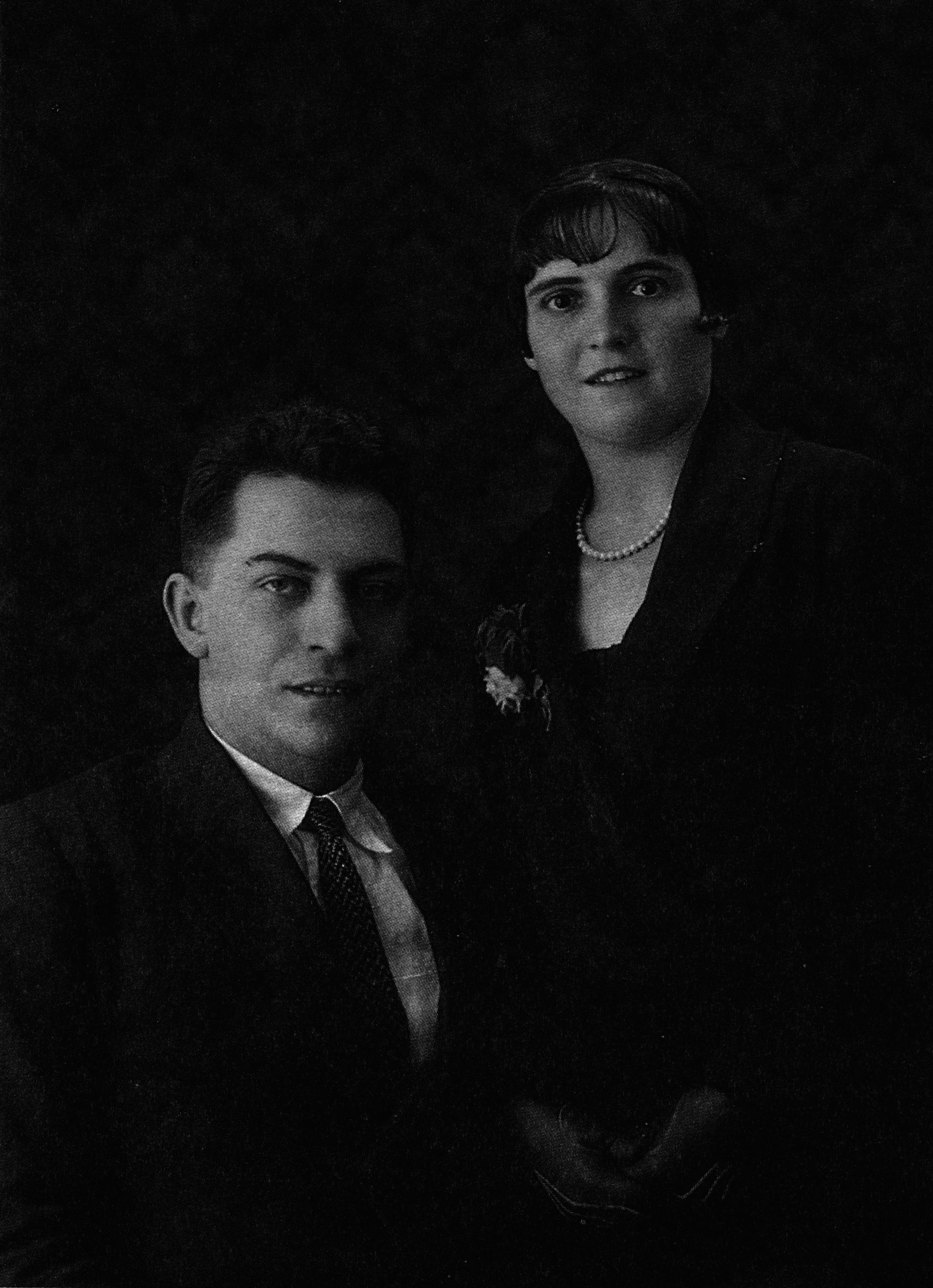
- Manuel Chaves Nogales with his wife, Ana Pérez Ruiz, in 1924
- Born: 7th August 1897; Seville, Spain
- Died: 8th May, 1944; Kew, London
- Occupations: Journalist and writer

Manuel Chaves Nogales (7th August 1897 – 8th May, 1944) was a Spanish journalist and writer. Politically he was a moderate left-wing republican democrat who defined himself as "antifascist and antirevolutionary". As such, he was an enthusiastic supporter of the Second Spanish Republic.

== Biography ==
Chaves's father was himself a journalist, and he began working in the newspaper El Liberal in Seville whilst he was still very young. In 1922 he moved with his wife and daughter to Madrid and there he worked for the Heraldo de Madrid with other young promising journalists.

In 1927 he won the most prestigious journalist prize in Spain, the Mariano de Cavia, with a feature article on Ruth Elder, the first woman to fly solo across the Atlantic. Because he was enthusiastic about the future he embarked on many risky flights including an adventurous flight to the new USSR, which gave him material for three new books: Around the World in an Aircraft; A Bourgeois in Red Russia and A Bolshevik in Love.

In 1931 he was appointed editor in chief of the influential newspaper, Ahora, ideologically supportive of the Republic and Manuel Azaña.

The following years he travelled extensively throughout Europe and the result was two more books on the Russian revolution: What is Left of the Empire of Tzars, published in 1931, and Juan Martinez, Who was There, published in 1934 which tells the story of a Spanish dancer who was caught in Russia during the 1917 revolution.

In 1935 he published a book on bullfighting, Juan Belmonte, matador de toros, su vida y sus hazañas, which was translated into English (as Juan Belmonte, Killer of Bulls). It was also translated into French.

When the Spanish Civil War broke out in July 1936 Chaves supported the cause of the Republic and stayed in Madrid, even though Ahora was seized by a revolutionary committee; but when the republican government abandoned Madrid and fled to Valencia he, like many other Spanish intellectuals, felt forced to leave Spain, horrified by the political repression practised by the advancing national army that were preparing Madrid besiege.

In exile in Paris in 1936 he worked for Cooperation Paris Service which sent articles to various South American newspapers. In Paris he also collaborated with the L’Europe Nouvelle and Candide.

In 1937 he published a new book, A sangre y fuego. Héroes, Bestias y Mártires de España (By Fire and Sword. Heroes, Beasts and Martyrs of Spain), considered one of the best books on the suffering of both sides of the civil war. In the prologue, Manuel Chaves writes that, "brutality and stupidity reigned in Spain, fed equally by the fever of communism and the blandness of fascism".

Owing to his many articles denouncing the advance of German fascism, his name was included on the Gestapo list and he was once again forced to abandon Paris when the German army approached the French capital, expressing his most profound disappointment and even outrage at the behaviour of French politicians on both the right and the left, and most of the Parisian populace.

In 1940 he arrived in London and between 1941 and 1942 he directed The Atlantic Pacific Press Agency, worked at the Evening Standard where he had his own column, and collaborated with BBC Overseas Broadcasts.

His wife and four children had returned to the south of Spain in 1940, fleeing from the German invasion of France and so Manuel Chaves Nogales lived on his own in London for four years whilst he continued his work as a journalist, fighting against extreme right and extreme left positions. He died in May 1944 of peritonitis at the age of 46. He is buried in an unmarked grave at North Sheen Cemetery in Kew, London.

== Works ==
- Narraciones Maravillosas y biografías ejemplares de algunos grandes hombres humildes y desconocidos: Caro Raggio, Madrid 1920. Libros Clan A. Gráficas S.L. 1994.
- La ciudad, Talleres de La Voz, Sevilla 1921. Universidad de Sevilla, colección de bolsillo 1977. New edition 2005.
- La vuelta a Europa en avión. Un pequeño burgués en la Rusia roja: Mundo Latino C.I.A.P., Madrid 1929.
- La bolchevique enamorada (El amor en la Rusia roja): Esther Barcelona 1929.
- El maestro Juan Martínez que estaba allí: Estampa 1934. Second edition, Colección Castillejo Narrativa, Sevilla 1992. Libros del Asteroide, Barcelona 2006.
- Juan Belmonte, matador de toros; su vida y sus hazañas: Estampa, Madrid 1935. Reissued: Alianza Editorial, Madrid 1992. English edition edited and translated by Leslie Charteris: Juan Belmonte, killer of bulls, W.W. Norton company inc. New York 1939.
- A sangre y fuego. Héroes, Bestias y Mártires de España: Ercilla, Santiago de Chile 1937. Espasa Editorial, Madrid. 2001. English translation: Heroes and Beasts of Spain, New York 1939.
- La agonía de Francia (The Fall on France): Editores Claudio García & Cía., Montevideo 1941. Biblioteca de Autores Sevillanos, Diputación de Sevilla 2001.
- Ifni, Spaniens letztes koloniale Abenteuer / aus dem Spanischen und eingeführt von Frank Henseleit, Köln : Kupido Literaturverlag, 2021, ISBN 978-3-96675-035-6
