= Sloane Avenue =

Street in London

Coordinates: 51.49233°N 0.16573°W

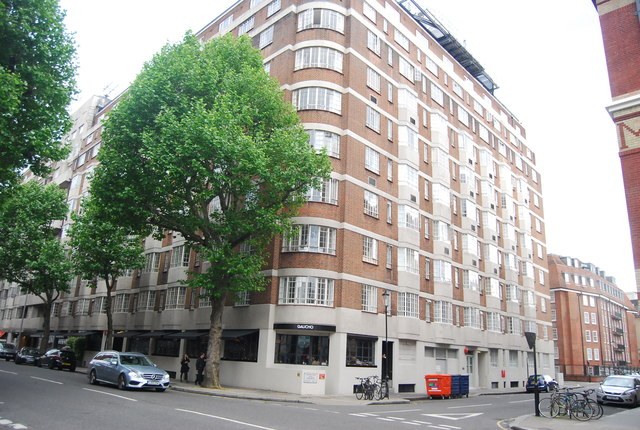
Apartment block, Sloane Avenue.

Sloane Avenue is a road in London.

Sloane Avenue runs roughly north-west to south-east from Brompton Road in Kensington to a junction with Elystan Place and Bray Place, and its short southern continuation, Anderson Street, joins the King's Road in Chelsea.

From 1908, the road, hitherto known as Keppel Street was renamed and widened.

Notable apartment buildings include Sloane Avenue Mansions and Nell Gwynn House, both designed by G. Kay Green.

== Notable residents ==
- No.7: Giorgos Seferis (1900-1971), Greek poet-diplomat, commemorated with a blue plaque
