= Gaberbocchus Press =

- Status: subsidiary of Uitgeverij De Harmonie
- Founded: 1948; 77 years ago
- Founders: Stefan and Franciszka Themerson
- Country of origin: United Kingdom
- Headquarters location: London
- Publication types: Books
- Official website: www.gaberbocchus.nl

The Gaberbocchus Press was a London publishing house founded in 1948 by the artist couple Stefan and Franciszka Themerson. Alongside the Themersons, the other directors of the Press were the translator Barbara Wright and the artist Gwen Barnard who also illustrated a number of the company's publications.

The name is the Latinized form of Jabberwocky and the earliest books were printed at their home on King's Road, Chelsea, London and in 1956 they moved to 42a Formosa Street in Maida Vale, London. In 1959 the basement of their office was turned into the Gaberbocchus Common Room, a meeting place for those interested in art and science. They showed films, plays and held poetry readings.

Over its 31 years the Gaberbocchus Press published over sixty titles, including their own works and those by Oswell Blakeston, the Irish poet George Henry Perrott Buchanan, Christian Dietrich Grabbe, Hugo Manning, Heinrich Heine, Raymond Queneau, C. H. Sisson, Stevie Smith, Anatol Stern, Kenneth Tynan, Alfred Jarry, Kurt Schwitters (Themerson wrote Kurt Schwitters in England in 1958), and Bertrand Russell. Alfred Jarry's Ubu Roi became one of its most celebrated titles and was published in many editions. The National Art Library owns 20 of their titles. Yearly greeting cards were sent to various contacts in the publishing business and a large set of these have been preserved at the National Library of Poland as Gaberbocchus: some of the old favourites.

The content of the Themersons' own books were often experiments with language and visual effects. The form was tailored for each publication to support and complement the content, using self-produced paper and other techniques. The couple sold their publishing company in 1979 to the Dutch publishing house Uitgeverij De Harmonie, which was also making experimental visual publications throughout the 1970s.

== Books published by Gaberbocchus Press ==
- Stefan Themerson. Jankel Adler - an Artist seen from one of many possible angles. 1948
- Aesop, The Eagle & the Fox & The Fox & the Eagle: two semantically symmetrical versions and a revised application, (devised by Stefan Themerson). Illustrated by Franciszka Themerson. 1949
- Hugo Manning. The Crown and The Fable. A poetic sequence. 1950
- Stefan Themerson & Barbara Wright. Mr Rouse builds his House. 1950
- (Translation of a story for children) Pan Tom buduje dom by Stefan Themerson, with 122 drawings by Franciszka. (Original Polish version published in Warsaw, 1938).
- Stefan Themerson. Wooff Wooff, or Who Killed Richard Wagner?. A novella with drawings by Franciszka Themerson. 1951
- Alfred Jarry. Ubu Roi. Drama in Five acts followed by the Song of Disembraining. First English translation and preface by Barbara Wright. Drawings by Franciszka Themerson. 1951
- Hugo Manning. This Room before Sunrise. Prose poem. 1952
- Bertrand Russell. The Good Citizen's Alphabet. An adventure in wicked humour. Illustrated by Franciszka Themerson. 1953
- C.H. Sisson. An Asiatic Romance. A satirical novel. 1953
- Stefan Themerson. Professor Mmaa's Lecture, An insect novel. Preface by Bertrand Russell. Illustrated by Franciszka Themerson. 1953
- Stefan Themerson. The Adventures of Peddy Bottom. A story illustrated by Franciszka Themerson. 1954
- John Conrad Russell. Abandon Spa Hot Springs. With two drawings by the author. 1954. Black series no.1
- Raymond Queneau. The Trojan Horse & At the Edge of the Forest. Translated by Barbara Wright. 1954. Black series no.2
- Franciszka Themerson. The Way it Walks. A book of cartoons. 1954. Black series no.3
- Eugene Walter. Monkey Poems. Illustrated with 8 engravings of monkeys. 1954
- Christian-Dietrich Grabbe. Comedy, Satire, Irony and Deeper Meaning. Drama in five Acts written by Grabbe in 1822, with drawings and collages by his contemporary Dr S. Willoughby. 1955
- Gwen Barnard. The Shapes of the River. A sequence of colour monoprints of the London Thames by Gwen Barnard with Comments by Eugene Walter. 1955.
- C.H. Sisson. Versions and Perversions of Heine. English version of 14 political poems by Heinrich Heine. 1955. Black series no.4
- Pol-Dives (Vladimir Polissadiv). The Song of Bright Misery/Le poème de la misère claire.36 illustrations by Pol-Dives from magic lantern slides, accompanied by an explanatory parallel text in French and in English. Translation by Barbara Wright. Preface by Stefan Themerson. 1955. Black series nos. 5-6
- Patrick Fetherston. Day Off. A story with drawings by Patrick Hayman. 1955. Black series no.7
- The Gaberbocchus Independent. Broadsheet about Gaberbocchus with extracts from books and reviews. 1955
- Stefan Themerson. factor T. An essay on human nature and another on beliefs, concluded with the Semantic Sonata and an index. 1956. Black series nos.8-9s.
- J.H. Sainmont. (pseudonym of Emmanuel Peillet), translated by Stanley Chapman. Camille Renault (1866-1954): World-maker. 1957. Black series no.10
- Axel Stern. Metaphysical Reverie, 1956. drawings by Jean Krillé . Black series no.11
- Beverly Jackson Huddleston. A Line in Time. Cartoons. 1957. Black series no.12
- The First Dozen by various authors. (The Black Series in a single volume) 1958
- Raymond Queneau. Exercises in Style. The story of a minor brawl in a Paris bus, told in 99 different ways. First English translation by Barbara Wright. 1958
- Stevie Smith. Some are more human than others. A sketchbook with handwritten comments and drawings by the author.' 1958
- Stefan Themerson. Kurt Schwitters in England: 1940-1948. The first publication of Schwitters' English poems and prose, written during the last 8 years of his life. 1958
- George Buchanan. Bodily Responses. Poetry. 1958
- George Buchanan. Green Seacoast. Autobiographical essay. 1959
- James Laughlin. Confidential Report & other poems (Selected Poems in some copies). 1959
- Harold Lang & Kenneth Tynan. The Quest for Corbett. Written for radio. Presentation by Franciszka Themerson. 1960
- Edmund Héafod (pseud. Osias Bain). Gimani. Prose journal. 1961
- Eugene Walter. Singerie-Songerie. A masque on the subject of Lyric Mode with illustrations by Zev. 1961
- George Buchanan. Conversations with Strangers. Poems and notes. 1961
- Oswell Blakeston. The Night's Moves. A thriller. 1961
- Stefan Themerson. Cardinal Pölätüo. Novel. 1961
- Raoul Hausmann & Kurt Schwitters. Pin and the story of Pin. Edited and introduced by Jasia Reichardt. 1962
- Anatol Stern. Europa. Facsimile reproduction of one of the first Polish futurist poems, 1925. Translated from the Polish by Michael Horovitz and Stefan Themerson. illustrated with stills from the Themersons' lost film of 1932. 1962
- Bertrand Russell. History of the World in Epitome (For use in Martian infant schools). 1962
- Franciszka and Stefan Themerson. Semantic Divertissements. 1962
- Oswell Blakeston. Fingers. Prose with drawings by Herbert Jones. 1964
- Stefan Themerson. Bayamus and the Theatre of Semantic Poetry. A semantic novel. 1965
- George Buchanan. Morning Papers. 1965
- Stefan Themerson. Tom Harris. Novel in two parts. 1967
- Patrick Fetherston. Three Days After Blasphemies. Poetry. 1967
- Stefan Themerson. Apollinaire's Lyrical Ideograms. 1968
- Franciszka Themerson. Traces of Living. Drawings. 1969
- Bertrand Russell. The Good Citizen's Alphabet. An adventure in wicked humour. Illustrated by Franciszka Themerson & History of the World in Epitome (For use in Martian infant schools). published in one volume.
- Stefan Themerson. Special Branch. A novel. 1972
- Stefan Themerson. St. Francis and the Wolf of Gubbio, or Brother Francis' Lamb Chops. An opera. 1972
- Cozette de Charmoy. The True Life of Sweeney Todd. 1973
- Stefan Themerson. Logic, Labels & Flesh. 11 essays. 1974
- David Miller. South London Mix. Poetic prose. 1975
- Stefan Themerson. On Semantic Poetry. 1975
- Henri Chopin. The Cosmographical Lobster. A poetic novel. 1976
- Stefan Themerson. General Piesc, or the Case of the Forgotten Mission. A short novel. 1976
- Stefan Themerson. The Urge to Create Visions. Essay on film. 1983
- Stefan Themerson. The Mystery of the Sardine. A novel. 1986
- Stefan Themerson. Hobson's Island. A novel. 1988
- Nicholas Wadley, ed. The Drawings of Franciszka Themerson, 1991
- Stefan Themerson. Collected Poems. 1997
