= The Mystery of the Sardine =

Novel by Stefan Themerson

The Mystery of the Sardine by Stefan Themerson, first U.S. edition published by Farrar, Straus & Giroux, 1986

The Mystery of the Sardine is a novel by Polish-English writer Stefan Themerson.

Initially the novel was called Euclid was an Ass, named thus for a tract written on Euclidean geometry by one of the characters. The manuscript came to the attention of the Dutch publisher De Harmonie, which had taken over Themerson's own Gaberbocchus Press, through which he had published his and his wife Franciszka's work, on a small scale. In 1985 a Dutch translation by Carol Limonard was published by De Bezige Bij. Through a Dutch-speaking person with connections to the English publisher Faber and Faber, it became published in English in 1986; Faber and Faber subsequently released more of Themerson's writing, including his last, Hobson's Island (1988). The novel was republished by Dalkey Archive Press.

A reviewer from Kirkus Reviews was less than impressed: "....a book whose best touch unfortunately is the title.... [It has] some political asides and some heavy-handed social comedy, and churn it very slowly into a stringy mass, and you have this book's sour-tasting fudge. Self-conscious to a fault but not even close to compelling". Justin Warshaw with the Times Literary Supplement noted that "the Mystery of the Sardine is never solved nor is it ever quite clear what it actually entails". In an appreciation of the Themersons published in 2015, Michael Caines noted that the TLS earlier praised the novel for its "many rum non sequiturs". American novelist Jonathan Lethem listed it as his summer reading in August 2015.

In 2005, a movie by Dutch filmmaker Erik van Zuylen based on Themerson's novel was released. Variety praised the film's technical qualities, but noted that it was unlikely to gain much traction outside of the Netherlands: "A large black dog with a sardine can around his neck is the unlikely suicide bomber apparently directed against philosophy lecturer Tim (Victor Low), who loses both legs in the blast. Trying to make sense of it, Tim obsessively goes over the period leading up to the attack, but nothing adds up. The mystery deepens when his wife, Vera (Renee Fokker), discovers a freshly painted representation of the attack in a local church. Embellishing the plot are absurdist side characters, notably a disheveled man often seen walking backwards. Tech credits are unassailable".
