= Stefan Themerson =

Polish filmmaker (1910–2000)

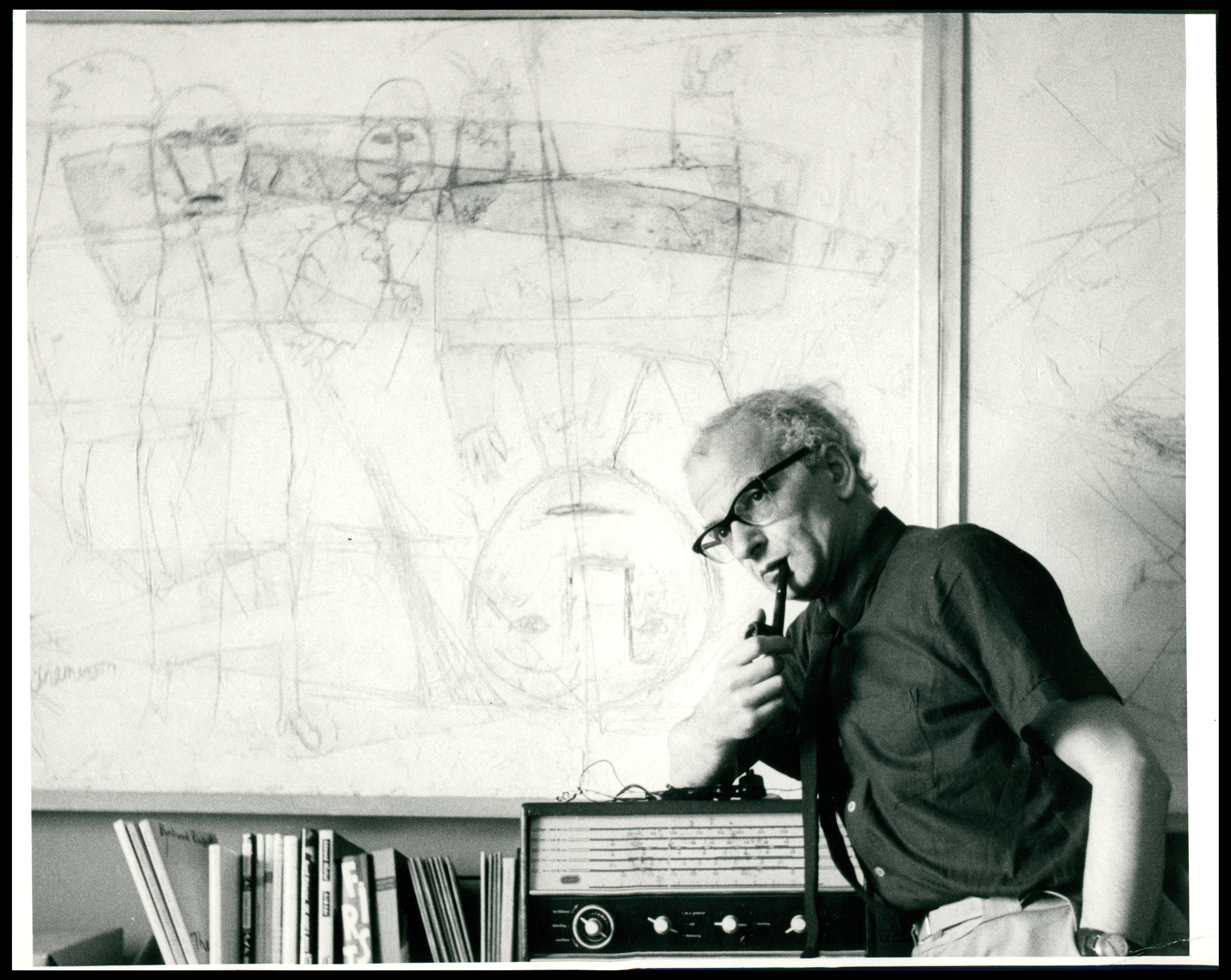
- Themerson in his studio in London, in front of a painting by his wife Franciszka
- Born: 25 January 1910; Płock, Congress Poland
- Died: 6 September 1988 (aged 78); London, England
- Known for: the Gaberbocchus Press, novelist, filmmaker, composer and philosopher
- Spouse: Franciszka Themerson

Stefan Themerson (25 January 1910 – 6 September 1988) was a Polish writer of children's literature, poet and inventor of Semantic Poetry, novelist, script writer, filmmaker, composer and philosopher. He wrote in at least three languages. With his wife, Franciszka Themerson, they are regarded as leading husband-and-wife exponents of European Surrealism and publishers.

== Early life ==
Stefan Themerson was born on 25 January 1910 in Płock, in what was then part of Congress Poland within the Russian Empire, and died in London on 6 September 1988.

His father, Mieczysław Themerson, was a physician, social reformer and aspiring writer (some of his work was published). His mother was Ludwika Smulewicz. During the First World War Dr. Themerson served as a medical officer in the Tsar's army and the family lived in Riga, St. Petersburg and Velikiye Luki. In 1918 they returned to Płock, in an independent Poland, where Stefan attended the Władysław Jagiełło Gymnasium. During this time he first showed an interest in photography and also built a radio receiver. Stefan's older brother, Roman, also qualified as a doctor, but died of spinal tuberculosis in 1929.

In 1928 Themerson went to Warsaw University to study physics. After a year, he transferred to the Warsaw Polytechnic to take up architecture, but spent most of his time working on photography, collage and film-making. His first published piece of writing was also in 1928. He never formally left his studies but gradually withdrew to follow his other interests. Themerson met the art student Franciszka Weinles, in 1929. She graduated with distinction in 1931 and they married the same year in Warsaw.

== 1931 to 1935 ==
During these years the Themersons lived and worked in Warsaw. Stefan contributed articles to various periodicals and prose and verse to school textbooks and wrote at least ten books for children which Franciszka illustrated. Pan Tom Buduje Dom, Mr Rouse Builds His House is still in print in Poland. Stefan also experimented with photograms and the two of them made five short experimental films Apteka (The Pharmacy) (1930), Europa (1931–1932), Drobiazg Melodyjny (Musical Moment) (1933), Zwarcie (Short Circuit) (1935) and Przygoda Człowieka Poczciwego (The Adventures of a Good Citizen) (1937). These were shown with other experimental films of the time. All except Przygoda Człowieka Poczciwego, which remained in Warsaw, were lost in Paris in the Second World War, but the script for Europa, based on a poem by Anatol Stern was later published by the Themersons' Gaberbocchus Press, illustrated by surviving stills from the film and Apteka and Drobiazg melodyjny were remade by Bruce Checefsky from descriptions of them when they first appeared, stills and storyboards. In 1983 Stefan, now living in London, made a reconstruction of the film with the London Film-Makers' Co-op. An incomplete copy of the original film was found in an archive in Berlin in 2019. Following restitution to the Themerson Estate, it was donated to the British Film Institute for conservation and preservation.

In 1935, with other young filmmakers, the Themersons founded a cooperative, S.A.F, Spółdzielnia Autorów Filmowych.

== 1936 to 1939 ==
In 1936 and 1937 the Themersons visited Paris, then the centre of the world for avant-garde art, and London, meeting Moholy-Nagy and other experimental artists and arranged first screenings of French and English avant-garde films on their return to Warsaw. They also founded a review Film Artistique, Stefan as editor, Franciszka as artistic editor (the journal of the film-makers' co-operative). Two issues were published, one on the French avant-garde, one on recent English film. A third issue, on the Polish Avant-garde, was planned but remained unpublished when, in the winter of 1937–38 they moved to Paris: "I just knew I had to be in Paris." Themerson said. Here they found a circle of artists and writers, many Polish, among whom to live and move. Themerson wrote for various Polish publications in Paris; Franciszka started to paint, and illustrated children's books for Flammarion. They planned to stay there, but – as for most of their generation – the outbreak of World War II changed their lives. With the declaration of war in 1939, the Themersons both enlisted, Stefan joined the Polish Army in the West forming in France after the German and Soviet invasions and partition of Poland. Franciszka was seconded to the Polish government-in-exile as a cartographer, first in France then from 1940 in London after the Fall of France.

== Second World War and after ==
In 1940 Themerson volunteered for a Polish infantry regiment in France, just in time for the German invasion and the Allies' collapse. His memory was of marching day and night in the summer heat to St-Nazaire. There, in June, the regiment was disbanded, the officers abandoning their men and the men dispersing where they could. Themerson travelled inside France, first returning (on foot) to occupied Paris, then on to Toulouse, where, through the Polish Red Cross, he re-established contact with Franciszka. She had been working for the Polish Government in Exile as a cartographer in Paris and Normandy and had subsequently escaped to London on a troopship from Bayonne. Meanwhile, he spent time in refugee camps, worked as a farm labourer, and spent nearly two years in a Polish Red Cross hostel, the Hôtel de la Poste in Voiron. Here he began writing Professor Mmaa's Lecture in Polish and wrote the long poem in French Croquis dans les Ténèbres (Sketches in Darkness). Much of their sporadic correspondence from the years 1940–1942 concerned attempts to engineer Stefan's escape from France.

Towards the end of 1942 Themerson got across France via Marseille and Spain to Lisbon whence he was flown to Britain by the R.A.F., rejoining his wife and re-enlisting in the Polish army. He spent time with the army in Scotland, where he finished Professor Mmaa, and then was sent to join the film unit of the Polish Ministry of Information and Documentation in London. There he and Franciszka, commissioned by the Polish Ministry of Information and Documentation, made two further short films, Calling Mr. Smith, an account of Nazi atrocities in Poland and The Eye and the Ear, inspired by four Julian Tuwim songs set to music by Szymanowski. In 1944 at the PEN club meeting to celebrate the three hundredth anniversary of John Milton's Areopagitica, Themerson met Kurt Schwitters, who became a close friend until Schwitters' death in 1948. At about the same time he met others who remained close, including Jankel Adler, Julian Trevelyan and Anthony Froshaug. Also in 1944 the Themersons moved to Maida Vale, where they lived for the rest of their lives. A close neighbour was the experimental poet and publisher Bob Cobbing with whom the Themersons kept close relations.

Stefan and Franciszka Themerson published many of their works through their own Gaberbocchus Press (the Latinised version of Jabberwocky) from 1948 to 1979. Most were designed and illustrated by Franciszka. They also worked with the translators Barbara Wright and Stanley Chapman, and the artist Gwen Barnard. Their list of some 70 titles included works by Guillaume Apollinaire, Jankel Adler and Kurt Schwitters, the first English translation of Alfred Jarry's Ubu Roi, Raymond Queneau's Exercises in Style and The Good Citizen's Alphabet by Bertrand Russell. The latter wrote an encouraging preface to Professor Mmaa's Lecture. Influenced by Queneau and his Oulipo circle, whom they visited in 1950, Stefan was the inventor of Semantic Poetry (see his 1945 novel Bayamus, and his 1975 tract On Semantic Poetry). His work was published in 0 to 9 magazine, a US publication which explored language and meaning-making. He wrote an opera, 'St. Francis and the Wolf of Gubbio' (1972). In 1981, Themerson delivered the annual Huizinga Lecture in Leiden in the Netherlands, under the title "The Chair of Decency". He died in London, two months after the death of Franciszka, in September 1988.

== Legacy ==
In 1979, the Gaberbocchus Press was taken over by Dutch publisher De Harmonie, at Themerson's invitation. They maintain the press's archive as well. It was through this Dutch connection that some of his novels gained recognition in the English-reading world; in 1985, Dutch publisher De Bezige Bij published a translation of an English manuscript, which they titled Euclid Was an Ass (Dutch: Euclides was een ezel"). This book was read by someone with connections at Faber and Faber, which in turn published the book in English, now called The Mystery of the Sardine (1986), and his last novel Hobson's Island (1988). These two novels and the earlier Tom Harris were later republished by Dalkey Archive Press.

The Themersons' eight volume archive has been assembled and catalogued by Franciszka's niece, the British arts curator, Jasia Reichardt. A Themerson Festival takes place annually in Themerson's native city, Płock in Poland.

== See also ==
- Franciszka Themerson
- Jasia Reichardt
