= Dufaycolor =

Early British colour film process

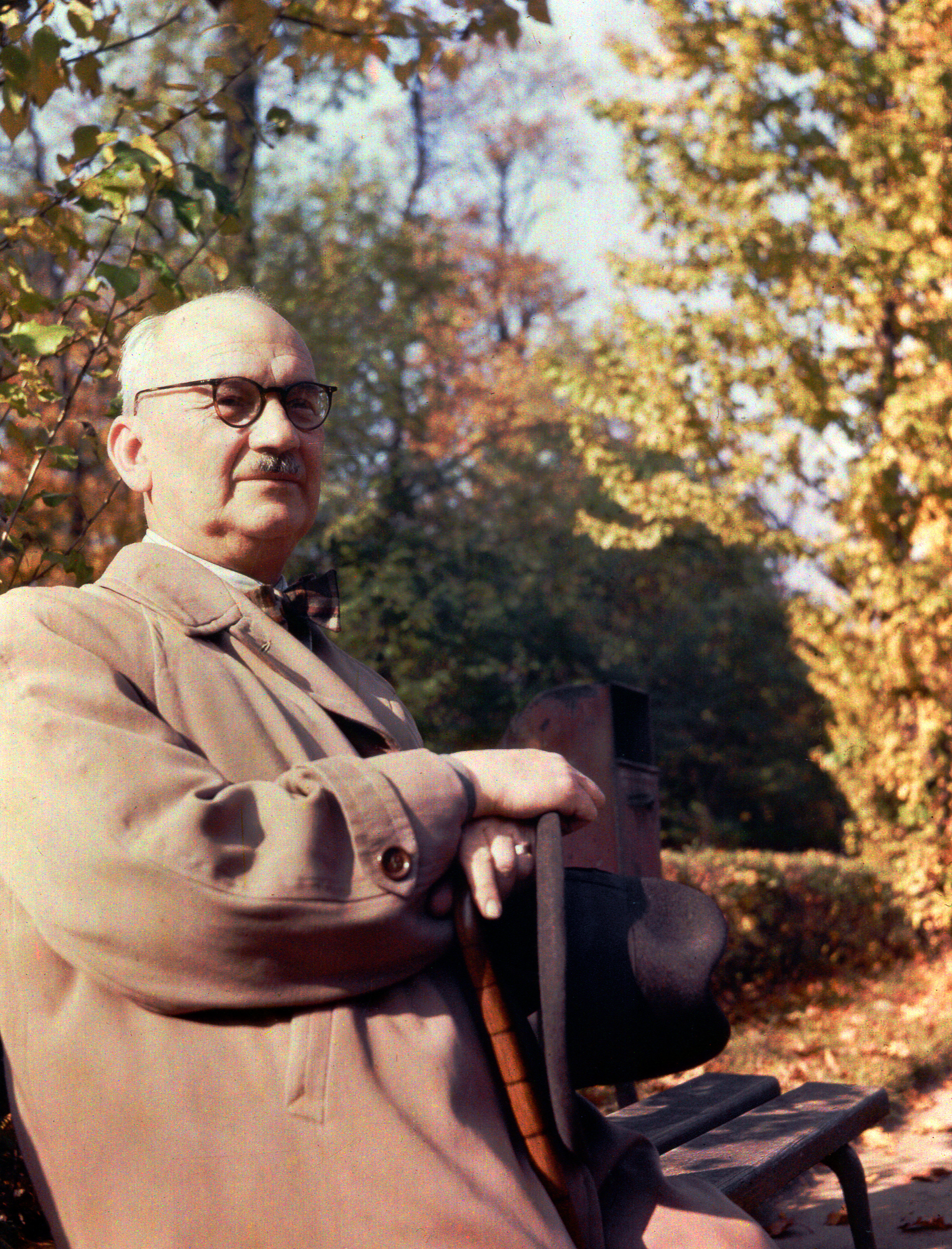
A home-processed Dufaycolor 6x6 cm transparency, 1956

Dufaycolor is an early British additive colour photographic film process, introduced for motion picture use in 1932 and for still photography in 1935. It was derived from Louis Dufay's Dioptichrome plates, a glass-based product for colour still photography, introduced in France in 1909. Both Dioptichrome and Dufaycolor worked on the same principles as the Autochrome process, but achieved their results using a layer of tiny colour filter elements arrayed in a regular geometric pattern, unlike Autochrome's random array of coloured starch grains. The manufacture of Dufaycolor film ended in the late 1950s.

== Process ==
The photographic reproduction of natural colour by means of a black-and-white photograph taken and viewed through a mosaic of tiny colour filters was an idea first patented and published by Louis Ducos du Hauron in the late 1860s, but the incomplete colour sensitivity of contemporary photographic materials made it impractical at that time. John Joly independently reinvented the concept in 1894 and attempted to commercialise it, but the first successful product based on this idea, the Autochrome plate, did not reach the market until 1907. Several competing mosaic colour screen plate products soon appeared, including Louis Dufay's Dioptichrome plate, but the Autochrome plate remained by far the most popular and the production of Dioptichrome was ended in 1914. A film-based version of Autochrome was introduced in 1931, shortly before the first Dufaycolor product appeared.

These plate and film products differed substantially only in the means used to manufacture the colour mosaic layer and its resulting pattern and fineness. Autochrome's mosaic was a random array of dyed potato starch grains, too small to be individually visible without a microscope. Most competing products employed a coarser geometric pattern created by one of the many methods devised and patented during that era. Dufaycolor's filter layer was of the geometric type, but its proprietary manufacturing process produced an unusually fine-patterned mosaic.

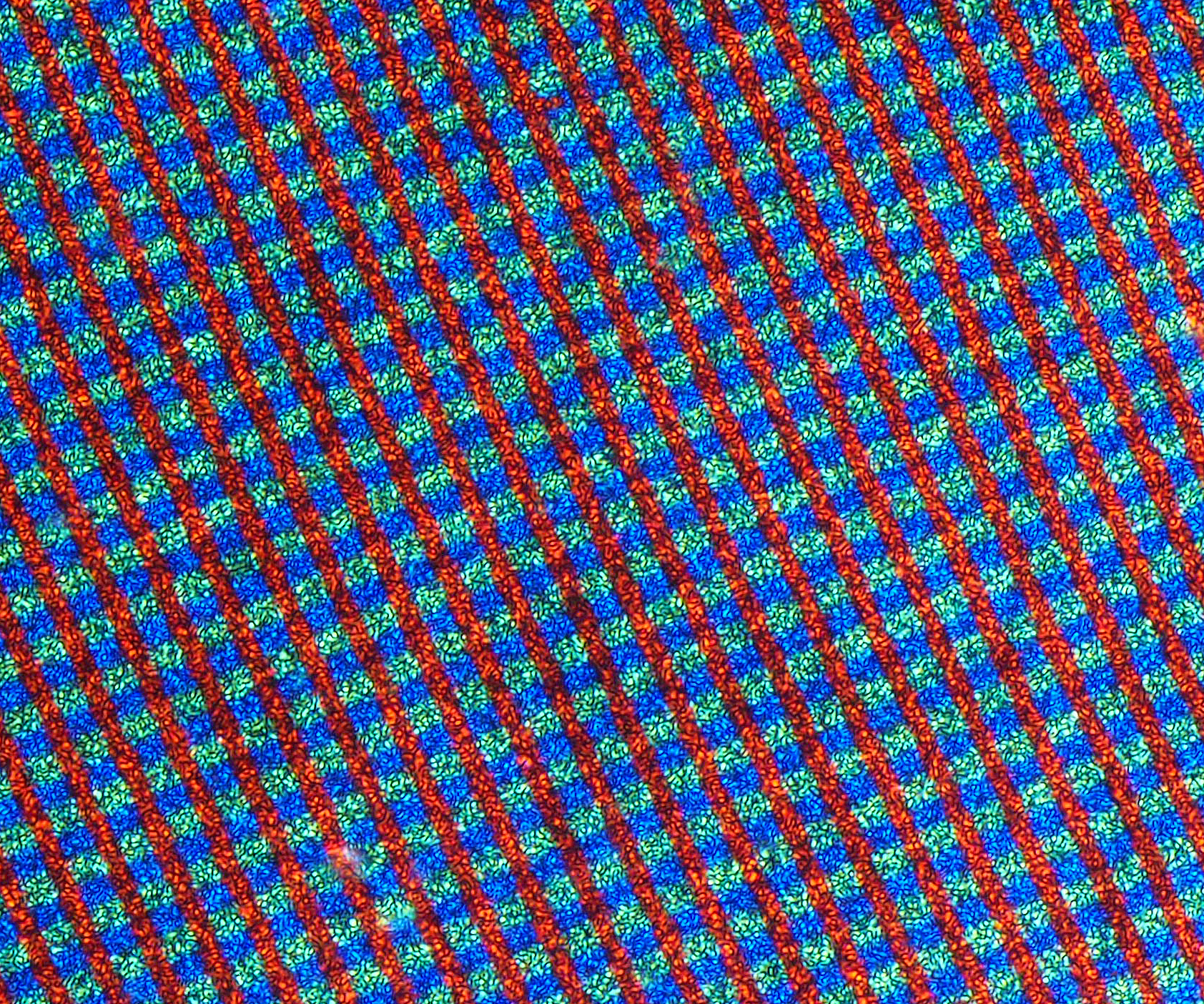
Closeup of the color filter layer (réseau) embedded in the base of a Dufaycolor transparency

A very thin coating of collodion on one side of the film base was dyed blue, printed with closely spaced fine lines using a water-repelling greasy ink, and bleached. The clear spaces created were then dyed green. The ink was removed, and new ink lines were printed at a 90-degree angle to the blue and green lines. The new gaps were bleached and dyed red, resulting in a colour filter mosaic, known as a réseau, consisting of alternating green and blue squares between red lines, and having roughly one million colour filter elements per square inch. In very early years, different arrangements of the same colours were used, the lines being green or blue instead of red and sometimes intersecting the other colours diagonally. After a final ink removal and the application of an isolating varnish, the same side of the film base was coated with a panchromatic black-and-white photographic emulsion. When exposed to light through the base and its réseau, the bit of emulsion behind each colour element recorded only the amount of light of that primary colour striking the film at that point.

Dufaycolor was normally a reversal film which was processed to produce the final positive image, instead of a negative, on the original film. In the case of still photographs, the result, known as a diapositive or transparency, was usually viewed directly by means of a backlight, but it could also be bound up between cover glasses or mounted in a small frame for use in a projector, in which form it was commonly called a slide. Small-gauge home movie films were also unique original positives, but to facilitate use for theatrical motion pictures, which required the production of numerous identical positive prints, a two-step negative-positive 35 mm version was introduced.

Upon projection, the réseau serves to filter the white projection light, so that the colours reaching the screen correspond to those in the recorded scene. For example, intensely red objects are represented by transparent areas behind the red filter elements and opaque areas behind the green and blue elements. The same principle operates with intensely green or blue objects. Less saturated tints, and non-primary colours such as orange, yellow, and purple, along with neutral grays and white, are reproduced by various proportions of red, green, and blue light blending together in the viewer's eye due to the tiny size and close spacing of the individual elements. Typical modern LCD video displays work similarly, combining a backlit black-and-white image layer with an array of hair-thin red, green, and blue vertical filter stripes.

Finished Dufaycolor films suffer from the two shortcomings inherent in all mosaic colour screen processes: the réseau absorbs most of the viewing or projection light, requiring the use of an unusually bright light for normal image brightness, and if too greatly magnified, the individual colour filter elements become disruptively visible.

== Product development ==
Louis Dufay's interests were purchased by British paper manufacturing firm Spicers in 1926, which then funded research to produce a workable colour motion picture film. In 1932, Spicers finally released Dufaycolor as a motion picture product.

Roll films for colour snapshots followed in 1935 and remained popular with some amateurs until manufacture ceased in the late 1950s. They were cheaper than the more sophisticated film types, some of which, especially Kodachrome, were not available in the sizes used by typical snapshot cameras, and amateur darkroom enthusiasts could process Dufaycolor at home almost as easily as black-and-white film. Medium and large format cut films for professional use were also made.

== Use in motion pictures ==
Dufaycolor was used in only two British-made feature films: the two colour sequences in Radio Parade of 1935 (1934), and the all-colour Sons of the Sea (1939), directed by Maurice Elvey. It was used for short films; Len Lye, for instance, used it for his films Kaleidoscope (1935), A Colour Box (1935), and Swinging the Lambeth Walk (1940). The GPO Film Unit used it for short documentaries such as How the Teleprinter Works (1940). Dufaycolor was also used for the final minutes of the Italian aviation film The Thrill of the Skies (1939). Dufaycolor was used for the British Movietone News footage of King George V's 1935 silver jubilee procession. Dufaycolor was used for the Polish anti-Nazi film Calling Mr. Smith (1943) by Stefan Themerson about Nazi crimes in German-occupied Europe and about lies of Nazi propaganda.

Although less expensive than other colour films, Dufaycolor was still expensive compared to black-and-white film. As colour became more common in motion pictures, Dufaycolor was superseded by technologically superior processes, such as three-strip Technicolor. Dufaycolor remained the only successfully implemented additive film stock for motion pictures until 1977, when Polaroid introduced Polavision, a system for making and viewing "instant" colour home movies that proved to be a spectacular commercial failure and was soon discontinued.

== See also ==
- Color motion picture film
- List of color film systems
- List of film formats
- Gasparcolor
- Early Color Feature Filmography
