= Calling Mr. Smith =

1943 Polish-British film

- Directed by: Franciszka Themerson; Stefan Themerson
- Written by: Franciszka Themerson; Stefan Themerson
- Release date: 1943
- Running time: 10–11 minutes
- Country: Poland
- Language: Polish

Calling Mr. Smith (Polish: Wzywając pana Smitha or Wzywamy Pana Smitha) is a short experimental (avant-garde) anti-Nazi Polish-British film from 1943, created by Franciszka Themerson and Stefan Themerson.

== Development ==
The film was written, directed, photographed and edited by Franciszka Themerson and Stefan Themerson, in association with the Film Bureau of the Ministry of Information and Documentation of the Polish government-in-exile in London. It reused some materials from the 1942 Black Book of Poland, a Polish report on German war crimes.

== Contents ==
The 10 or 11-minutes-long film juxtaposes still and moving images from war photographs and newsreels (including from German propaganda, such as a clip of the Bydgoszcz massacre) showing the outrages of war with flashes of colorful lights. It uses techniques such as anamorphic lenses, the Dufaycolor technique, cartoon animation, photomontages, photograms and double exposure. The narration (with a female voice) is considered amorphous and abstract.

The soundtrack contained classic music scores by Johann Sebastian Bach, Fryderyk Chopin and Karol Szymanowski, as well as the distorted German anthem (Horst-Wessel-Lied).

== Reception and analysis ==
The film was censored in the UK due to a controversial scene showing a hanged woman on the gallows, which the British censors demanded be removed, which Themerson refused to do. This meant that the film could not be shown in public cinemas. Nonetheless, the film was well received by contemporary British critics, and has been described as "a sensation in London film circles"; it has also been described as "the only experimental film made in England during the war". While the rhetoric of the film was considered commonplace for its time and place, the combination of images with classical music, and the overall tone, was well received.

The aim of the film was to show the terror of German occupation to the British public (the titular everyman "Mr. Smith"), and criticize their passivity. By contrasting Bach music with contemporary (and distorted) German anthem, images of cultural artifacts and childish, comic-book font with war atrocities, the film posed a question to the viewers: how could a cultured nation such as Germany commit terrible, barbaric-like atrocities? The film also showed the destruction of Polish culture by the Germans. Some imagery of the film invokes Polish martyrology (in particular, the concept of Poland as the Christ of Europe).

The use of German newsreels has been described as an early example of found footage, and as a satire of propaganda.

The film style has been described as Futurist and Dada-like, and inspired by Norman McLaren’s Hell Unlimited (1936) as well as Themerson's own Europa (1935).

As the film also contained scenes of German atrocities against Polish Jews, it is also considered one of the early Holocaust films.
