= Barbara Wright (translator) =

English translator

- Born: 13 October 1915; Worthing, Sussex, England
- Died: 3 March 2009 (aged 93); London, England, UK
- Spouse: Walter Hubbard (sep.)
- Writing career
- Notable awards: Commandeur, Ordre des Arts et des Lettres (France)

Barbara Winifred Wright (13 October 1915 – 3 March 2009) was an English translator of modern French literature.

== Early life ==
Wright was born on 13 October 1915 in Worthing, West Sussex. After attending Godolphin School in Salisbury, she studied to be a pianist at the Royal College of Music in London and trained under Alfred Cortot in Paris. Wright taught at Dora Russell's Beacon Hill School from 1936 to 1937. In 1938 she married Walter Hubbard, a kinsman of the Barons Addington – the couple had a daughter in 1944, before separating in 1957.

Though she never formally studied as a translator, Wright believed that her work as an accompanist helped her capture the rhythm of the text. Her first major translation was Alfred Jarry's Ubu Roi, published in 1951 by Gaberbocchus Press.

== Translator ==
Wright specialised in the translation of poetic prose and drama with a focus on French surrealist and existential writing. While working on a translation, she immersed herself in the author's world. Reading other texts by the writer, conferring with francophones about French idioms and, where possible, forging relationships with the authors were all aspects of her process. Over the course of her career Wright worked closely with, and befriended, Raymond Queneau, Robert Pinget and Nathalie Sarraute. In addition to her translations, Wright authored literary criticism and was a regular contributor to the Times Literary Supplement as a reviewer.

After she had completed translations of two short stories by Queneau, the author proposed that Wright translate his Exercices de style. The work had been deemed 'untranslatable' due to Queneau's reliance on unique French writing styles and language. Trusting her skill, Queneau encouraged and endorsed Wright's improvised English equivalents of French turns of phrase. The result was a resounding success with her text becoming the basis for translations of the work in other languages. In 2008 it was recognised as one of the best translations during a 50-year period by the Society of Authors.

In 1953 Wright was elected a member of the College of Pataphysics, as Régente de Zozologie Shakespearienne. She was elevated to Satrape in 2001, a position she held alongside Umberto Eco and Jean Baudrillard. In 1986 Wright was appointed Commandeur of l'Ordre des Arts et des Lettres. She was also a two-time recipient of the Scott Moncrieff Prize. Wright was recognised in 1987 for her translation of Pierre Albert-Birot's Grabinoulor and again in 1992 for Michel Tournier's The Midnight Love Feast.

After separating from her husband, Wright lived at Hampstead in north London, and died on 3 March 2009. Her literary translation papers are held by the Lilly Library at Indiana University. The authors she translated who are represented in the collection include Jean Hamburger, Eugène Ionesco, Alfred Jarry, Pierre Lauer, Robert Pinget, Raymond Queneau, Nathalie Sarraute and Stefan Themerson. Correspondence from publishers of Wright's works, including Gaberbocchus Press, John Calder, Doubleday, Faber & Faber, New Directions, the Atlas Press and Red Dust, are also present.

== Translations ==
=== Pierre Albert-Birot ===
- The First Book of Grabinoulor.1986
- 31 Pocket Poems. 2003

=== Fernando Arrabal ===
- Orison; The Two Executioners; Fernando and Lis; The Car Cemetery in Plays. vol. 1 1962.
- Guernica; The Labyrinth; The Tricycle; Picnic on the Battlefield; The Condemned Man's Tricycle in Plays. vol. 2. 1967.

=== Elisabeth Badinter ===
- The Unopposite Sex [Man/Woman: The One is the Other]. 1989

=== Samuel Beckett ===
- Eleutheria. 1996

=== Simone Benmussa ===
- The Singular Life of Albert Nobbs. 1979
- Three Plays. (The Singular Life of Albert Nobbs, Appearance and The Death of Ivan Illich) in collaboration with Donald Watson 2000
- 'Appearances' in Gambit No. 35. 1980

=== Sylvia Bourdon ===
- Love is a Feast. 1977.

=== Muriel Cerf ===
- 'Blitz-Fortune' in Real Life – Writers from Nine Countries Illuminate the Life of the Modern Woman. 1981

=== André Couteaux ===
- Portrait of the Boy as a Young Wolf/My Father's Keeper. 1968.

=== Roland Dubillard ===
- The House of Bones. 1971.
- The Swallows. 1969

=== Marguerite Duras ===
- The Long Absence. 1966.

=== Romain Gary ===
- King Solomon. 1983

=== Jean Genet ===
- The Balcony. 1971. (with Terry Hands)

=== Alberto Giacometti ===
- The Dream, The Sphinx and The Death of T. in Grand Street in Space No. 54. 1995

=== Christian Dietrich Grabbe ===
- Comedy, Satire. Irony and Deeper Meaning (translation from German, illustrated by Franciszka Themerson). 1955.

=== Henri Guigonnat ===
- Daemon in Lithuania. 1985

=== Jean Hamburger ===
- The Diary of William Harvey. 1992

=== Eugène Ionesco ===
- Journeys Among the Dead. 1985

=== Ludovic Janvier ===
- The Bathing Girl (revision of translation by John Matthew). 1976

=== Alfred Jarry ===
- The Supermale. 1968.
- Ubu Roi (illustrated by Franciszka Themerson). 1951.

=== Yves Klein ===
- Selected Writings. (in part). 1974

=== Monique Lange ===
- The Catfish in New Writers 1. 1960.

=== Pierre Lauer ===
- The Suns of Badarane. 1971.

=== Herbert Le Porrier ===
- The Doctor From Cordoba. 1979.

=== Andrée Martinerie ===
- Second Spring. 1962.

=== Patrick Modiano ===
- Honeymoon. 1992

=== René de Obaldia ===
- Monsieur Klebs and Rosalie in Plays Vol. 4. 1985

=== Robert Pinget ===
- A Bizarre Will. 1989.
- Abel and Bela.. 1987.
- Be Brave. 1994.
- Between Fantoine and Agapa. 1982.
- Fable. 1980.
- Film script: 15 Rue des Lilas. in Renouard & Kelly. 2013
- Monsieur Songe with The Harness, Plough. 1988.
- Passacaglia. 1978.
- Recurrent Melody. 1975.
- Someone. 1984.
- That Voice. 1982.
- The Apocrypha. 1986.
- The Enemy. 1991.
- The Libera Me Domine. 1972
- Theo, or The New Era. 1994.
- Traces of Ink. 1998.
- Trio (Between Fatoine and Agapa, That Voice, Passacaglia). 2005.

=== Pol-Dives (Vladimir Polissadiv) ===
- The Song of Bright Misery. 1955.

=== Aude Yung-de Prévaux ===
- Jacques & Lotha. 2000

=== Raymond Queneau ===
- Exercises in Style. 1958.
- Zazie in the Metro. 1960.
- A Blue Funk and Dino in French Writing Today. 1968.
- Alfred in Journal of Literary Translation. vol. XXIII. 1990
- Between Blue and Blue. 1967.
- Five Stories: Panic; Dino; At the Edge of the Forest; A Blue Funk; The Trojan Horse. 2000.
- Pierrot Mon Ami. 1987.
- The Bark Tree. 1968.
- The Flight of Icarus. 1973.
- The Last Days. 1990.
- The Sunday of Life. 1976.
- The Trojan Horse; At the Edge of the forest. 1954.
- We Always Treat Women Too Well. 1981
- Introduction and comments with extracts from Zazie, Pierrot, and The Flight of Icarus, in "Tolling Elves 5" February 2003 to celebrate Queneau's centenary.
- publication of script for radio adaptation of Exercises in Style broadcast on 25 December 1959 by the BBC with introduction by Barbara Wright. 2006.

=== Pascal Quignard ===
- Georges de La Tour. 1991

=== Alain Robbe-Grillet ===
- Snapshots and Towards a New Novel. 1965.
- In the Corridors of the Underground in French Writing Today. 1968.
- The Secret Room in The Penguin Book of French Short Stories. 1968.

=== Jean Rouaud ===
- Of Illustrious Men. 1996
- The World, More or Less. 1997

=== Nathalie Sarraute ===
- Childhood. 1983
- Here. 1997
- It is There and other plays. 1980
- The Use of Speech. 1982
- You Don't Love Yourself. 1990
- Fragments From Darkness. 1998

=== Coline Serrau ===
- Lapin, Lapin. 1995

=== Liliane Siegel ===
- In the Shadow of Sartre. 1990

=== Stefan Themerson and Franciszka Themerson ===
- Mr Rouse Builds His House. 1950 (translated from Polish with Stefan Themerson)

=== Roland Topor ===
- Leonardo Was Right. 1978

=== Michel Tournier ===
- The Fetishist and Other Stories. 1983
- A Garden at Hammamet. 1986
- The Golden Droplet. 1987
- The Midnight Love Feast. 1991
- Totems. 1991

=== Tristan Tzara ===
- Seven Dada Manifestoes and Lampisteries. 1977.

Wright also wrote various plays, libretti (three by Mozart), artists' manifestos, composers' programme notes, introductions, forewords and postscripts.
