= Europa (1931 film) =

Surrealist short film

Europa is a 12-minute anti-fascist film made in 1931 in Warsaw, Poland by surrealists Stefan and Franciszka Themerson. The film is based on Anatol Stern's 1925 futurist poem Europa. It uses collages and photograms, and articulates the sense of horror and moral decline its makers were witnessing. The film, while long thought to have been lost, is considered an avant-garde masterpiece.

== History ==
The Themersons moved to Paris in 1938. When the Second World War broke out they deposited copies of five films, including Europa, at the Vitfer film laboratory. Nazi Germany seized the films after invading France, and they were thought to have been lost.

After the war the Themersons moved to London. In 1983 Stefan made a reconstruction of the film with the London Film-Makers' Co-op.

Unexpectedly the 1931 film was discovered by chance in the Bundesarchiv (Germany's national archives), in 2019. The Commission for Looted Art in Europe negotiated for the film on behalf of the Themerson estate; it was donated to the BFI National Archive. A restoration of the silent film, with a new soundtrack by Dutch composer Lodewijk Muns was shown for the first time at the BFI London Film Festival on 6 October 2021, introduced by Franciszka Themerson’s niece, the art curator Jasia Reichardt.
