= Rusty Magee =

American songwriter (1955–2003)

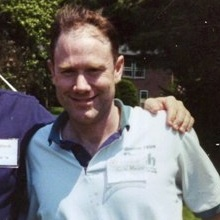
- Magee in June 2000
- Born: Benjamin Rush Magee; August 6, 1955; Washington, D.C., U.S.
- Died: February 16, 2003 (aged 47); New York City, New York, U.S.
- Occupations: Comedian, actor, composer/lyricist
- Spouse: Alison Fraser (m. 1984)
- Children: 1

Benjamin Rush "Rusty" Magee (August 6, 1955 – February 16, 2003) was an American comedian, actor and composer/lyricist for theatre, television, film and commercials.

== Biography ==
=== Early life ===
Magee was born in Washington, D.C., the son of Dr. Kenneth Raymond Magee and Bettie Morris Magee. He was raised in Ann Arbor, Michigan, along with his three brothers. He graduated from Eaglebrook School in 1970 and then Phillips Exeter Academy in 1973. He received his bachelor's degree in music at Brown University in 1978 and was awarded an honorary Masters of Fine Arts from the Yale School of Drama after working there for three years as Musical Consultant for the Yale Repertory Theatre and the Yale School of Drama.

=== Career ===
In 1981, Magee and friend Rob Barron wrote 1919: A Baseball Opera, based on the infamous Black Sox Scandal. The musical premiered in June 1981 at Yale Repertory Theater and was reviewed in Sports Illustrated by Robert Creamer.

Magee eventually moved to New York, where he became an accomplished composer and lyricist for theatre, television, and film and commercials. He was also an established comedian who lampooned popular musicians and musical genres. He often concluded his act with a rendition of Van Morrison's "Brown Eyed Girl", which soon become a trademark. Magee co-produced and wrote the music for hundreds of one-act plays as musical director and co-founder (with comedian Lewis Black and Rand Forester) of Steve Olsen's West Bank Cafe Downstairs Theatre Bar in New York City. The theatre was known for cultivating raw, undiscovered talent and many renowned playwrights such as Aaron Sorkin, Warren Leight and Alan Ball had works staged at the West Bank Cafe early in their careers.

In 1986, Magee appeared in a bit part (as a comedian named Ronnie) in Woody Allen's film Hannah and Her Sisters (the film also featured Lewis Black). That same year, he arranged and performed the music for the Tony Award-winning production of The House of Blue Leaves at Lincoln Center and on Broadway and PBS. He won the New York James Fleetwood Outer Critics Circle Award for his music and lyrics for Molière's Scapin (starring Stanley Tucci). This adaptation has been produced at CSC Repertory Theatre, Yale Repertory Theatre, the Intiman Playhouse in Seattle, the Court in Chicago, and American Conservatory Theater in San Francisco. He wrote the music and lyrics for ART's production of Carlo Goldoni's Servant of Two Masters and Molière's The Imaginary Invalid.

In 1987, Magee originated the role of Sparky in Stuart Ross’ Off-Broadway musical review, Forever Plaid.

Magee once again collaborated with Lewis Black on The Czar Of Rock And Roll, a musical based on the real-life story of singer Dean Reed. The show was staged at Houston's famous Alley Theatre in 1990. Two years later, Magee began working with RENT composer Jonathan Larson, Bobby Golden and Paul Scott Goodman on a new musical called Sacred Cows, an irreverent retelling of the Creation Myth. The musical was never staged, but a demo recording (sung mostly by Larson and Magee) was released on iTunes over 20 years later. In 1993, Magee took part in a workshop presentation of RENT, playing the role of Benny.

In 1995, Magee wrote the music and lyrics for Ubu Rock, a musical based on Alfred Jarry's controversial 1896 French play Ubu Roi. Co-written Shelley Berc and Andrei Belgrader, Ubu Rock premiered at the ART. The Boston Globe called the show "scatological, sexually puerile and deliberately offensive, even in the Beavis and Butt-head age," but raved it was "the most entertaining and provocative production of the American Repertory Theatre schedule." His full length musical The Green Heart (co-written with playwright Charles Busch) was produced by The Manhattan Theatre Club in 1997, and is published by Samuel French.

With Moonwork Theatre Company, Magee composed music for Off-Broadway adaptations of Shakespeare's Twelfth Night (in which he played Feste) and A Midsummer Night's Dream (in which he played Peter Quince) He was also music director of the Irish Repertory Theatre (Manhattan), a role he continued in even after his illness was diagnosed. With the Irish Rep, Magee composed the music for Frank McCourt's musical The Irish...And How They Got That Way. The full musical was recorded by PBS and released on video; a cast album was also released on the Universal Music Group label. Magee collaborated again with Bobby Golden, writing songs for Nickelodeon's animated series The Wubbulous World of Dr. Seuss, as well as Out of the Box on the Disney Channel. Golden and Magee's song "Road To Victory" was featured in the documentary film New School Order. Magee wrote songs for Arthur: A Live Adventure, a musical based on the "Arthur" children's books by Marc Brown and the PBS animated series Arthur. It was presented at Radio City Music Hall in New York City in May 2000 as well as at theaters nationwide. Magee, with Billy Aronson (co-conceiver of RENT) wrote the children's opera Flurry Tale, which was produced by American Opera Projects/Family Opera Initiative in New York City.

His cabaret anthem, "New York Romance", was performed at Carnegie Hall by his wife, Alison Fraser and his music has been sung by renowned performers such as Mary Testa, Rebecca Luker, Judy Kuhn, Pattie Darcy Jones and Annie Golden.

== Family ==
In 1984, he married actress Alison Fraser; the couple had one son, Nathaniel.

== Sweet Appreciation and Death ==
A year before Magee died, a celebration of his life and work was held at the West Bank Cafe in Manhattan. The concert was hosted by Lewis Black and featured Magee's songs performed by Rebecca Luker, Alison Fraser and Mary Testa. Rupert Holmes serenaded the honoree with creep-song "Timothy", a Buoys hit Holmes had penned. Magee gave an impromptu half-hour set on piano, in which he both played songs and reflected on his life. The concert, appropriately named Sweet Appreciation (after a Magee song based on Walt Whitman's poem "Thanks in Old Age") was recorded and later released on CD. Rusty Magee died of colon cancer, aged 47 and is interred at Forest Hills Cemetery in Ann Arbor, Michigan.

== Accolades and Affiliations ==
He belonged to Actors' Equity Association, the Screen Actors Guild, AFTRA, and ASCAP. In 2000, Magee was awarded the "Coming Up Taller" Humanitarian Award from then-First Lady Hillary Clinton at the White House for his work at the 52nd St. Project, a theatre company in Hell's Kitchen.

== Legacy and Tributes ==
In the fall of 2008, Alison Fraser and Mary Testa performed a tribute show called Together Again at the West Bank Cafe's Laurie Beechman Theatre.

A YouTube archive of Magee's work was launched in 2013 and was featured in a Playbill.com article.

On January 20, 2019, another tribute concert called Rusty Revisited was performed at 54 Below, featuring Tony Award winner Daisy Eagan.

In December 2023, Magee and Billy Aronson's children's opera Flurry Tale was adapted as Vinteryra and performed at Sweden's Malmö Opera.
