= Franciszka Themerson =

Polish-British painter, illustrator, filmmaker and stage designer

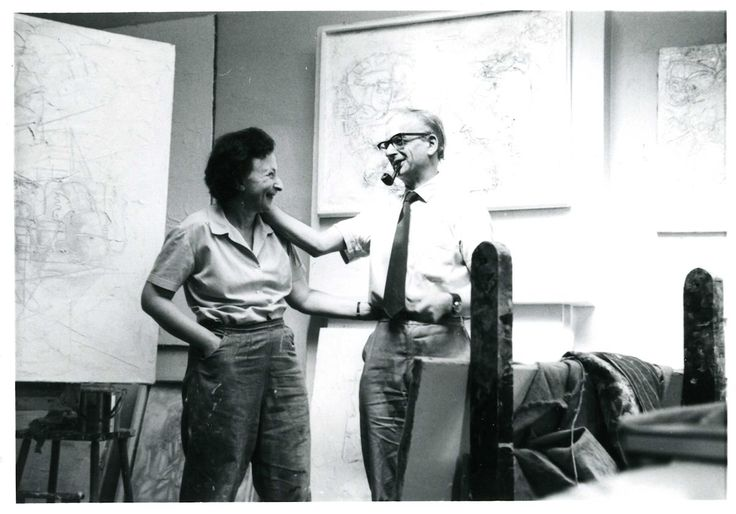
- Franciszka and Stefan Themerson
- Born: 28 June 1907; Warsaw, Russian Empire
- Died: 29 June 1988 (aged 81); London
- Education: Chopin University of Music; Warsaw School of Fine Arts
- Spouse: Stefan Themerson
- Relatives: Jasia Reichardt (niece)

Franciszka Themerson (28 June 1907 – 29 June 1988) was a Polish, later British, painter, illustrator, filmmaker and stage designer.

== Early life ==
Themerson was born in Warsaw in 1907, the daughter of the artist Jakub Weinles and pianist Łucja (née Kaufman). Weinles' family was Jewish. She had older sister, the illustrator and pianist Maryla Weinles-Chaykin (1900–1942). She graduated from the Chopin University of Music and the Warsaw School of Fine Arts with a distinction in 1931. Also in 1931, she married the photographer and writer, Stefan Themerson.

== Career ==
From 1938 to 1940 she lived in Paris, and then from 1940 in London until her death in 1988. She was principally a painter, although throughout her life she worked in several other fields of the visual arts: illustration, stage and graphic design.

Themerson collaborated with her husband, the writer Stefan Themerson, on experimental films: Apteka [The Pharmacy] (1930), Europa (1931–1932), Drobiazg Melodyjny [Musical Moment] (1933), Zwarcie [Short Circuit] (1935) and Przygoda Czlowieka Poczciwego [Adventure of a Good Citizen] (1937). Only the last of these survives, along with two films they made together in Britain. Calling Mr. Smith (1943) is an account of Nazi atrocities in Poland, and The Eye and the Ear (1944–45) investigates the visualisation of music. In 1983 Stefan, now living in London, made a reconstruction of Europa with the London Film-Makers' Co-op. An incomplete copy of the original film was found in an archive in Berlin in 2019. Following restitution to the Themerson Estate, it was donated to the British Film Institute for conservation and preservation.

She illustrated books for children written by her husband and others, and in 1948 she founded with her husband the quirky publishing company Gaberbocchus Press, of which she was the art director. The press was named after a Latinisation of 'Jabberwocky', the nonsense poem from Lewis Carroll's Alice in Wonderland whose name was coined by Carroll's uncle Hassard Dodgson. In 31 years the Gaberbocchus Press published over sixty titles, including works by Alfred Jarry, Kurt Schwitters, Bertrand Russell and the Themersons themselves. Alfred Jarry's Ubu Roi was its flagship publication, published in many editions and still in print. The Gaberbocchus edition is an apposite evocation of the spirit of Jarry's grotesque fable. The text, which was hand-written directly onto lithographic plates by the translator, Barbara Wright – interspersed with Themerson's conté crayon illustrations – is printed on bright yellow pages. Themerson's contributions as illustrator enormously enhanced the graphic originality of the design of Gaberbocchus books. Apart from appearing in many journals worldwide, several collections of her drawings have been published as books: Forty Drawings for Friends, London 1940-42 (1943), The Way It Walks (1954), Traces of Living (1969) and Music (1998).

Themerson's theatrical designs included marionette productions of Ubu Roi, Ubu Enchainé and Brecht's Threepenny Opera, mostly made for the Marionetteater in Stockholm, in the 1960s, which toured worldwide for decades, to international acclaim. Many of them were subsequently exhibited at London's National Theatre in 1993.

Her major solo exhibitions of paintings and drawings include those at Gallery One One One in 1957 and 1959; Drian Galleries, 1963; Zachęta, Warsaw, 1964; New Gallery, Belfast, 1966; Demarco Gallery, Edinburgh, 1968; A retrospective at the Whitechapel Art Gallery, 1975; Gruenebaum, New York City, 1978; Łódź, Warsaw, Wrocław, 1981–1982; Nordjyllands Kunstmuseum, Aalborg, 1991; Gardner Arts Centre, University of Sussex, 1992; Gdańsk, 1993; Redfern Gallery, 1993; National Theatre, 1993; Royal Festival Hall, 1993. Unposted Letters, Imperial War Museum in 1996; Kordegarda, Warsaw, 1998; Art First, London, 1999 and 2001; CK Zamek, Poznań, 2004; Europe House, London, 2013; GV Art Gallery, London 2013; Museum of Art in Łódź, 2013.

A collection of Themerson's greeting cards, called Gaberbocchus some of the old favourites is in the collection of the National Library of Poland.

Themerson died in 1988, in London, England.

== Books illustrated by Franciszka Themerson published by the Gaberbocchus Press ==
- Aesop, The Eagle & the Fox & The Fox & the Eagle: two semantically symmetrical versions and a revised application, (devised by Stefan Themerson). 1949
- Stefan Themerson & Barbara Wright. Mr Rouse builds his House. 1950. (Translation of a story for children Pan Tom buduje dom by Stefan Themerson, with 122 drawings by Franciszka. Original Polish version published in Warsaw, 1938.) Tate 2013.
- Stefan Themerson. Wooff Wooff, or Who Killed Richard Wagner?. A novella with drawings by Franciszka Themerson. 1951
- Alfred Jarry. Ubu Roi. Drama in Five acts followed by the Song of Disembraining. First English translation and preface by Barbara Wright. Drawings by Franciszka Themerson. 1951
- Bertrand Russell. The Good Citizen's Alphabet. An adventure in wicked humour. Illustrated by Franciszka Themerson. 1953. Tate 2017.
- Stefan Themerson. Professor Mmaa's Lecture, An insect novel. Preface by Bertrand Russell. Illustrated by Franciszka Themerson. 1953
- Stefan Themerson. The Adventures of Peddy Bottom. A story illustrated by Franciszka Themerson. 1954
- Raymond Queneau. The Trojan Horse & At the Edge of the Forest. Translated by Barbara Wright. frontispice by Franciszka Themerson. 1954. Black series no.2
- Franciszka Themerson. The Way it Walks. A book of cartoons. 1954. Black series no.3
- C.H. Sisson. Versions and Perversions of Heine. English version of 14 political poems by Heinrich Heine. 1955. Black series no.4
- The Gaberbocchus Independent. Broadsheet about Gaberbocchus with extracts from books and reviews. 1955
- Stefan Themerson. factor T. An essay on human nature and another on beliefs, concluded with the Semantic Sonata and an index. drawings by Franciszka Themerson. 1956. Black series nos.8-9s.
- The First Dozen by various authors. (The Black Series in a single volume) 1958
- Harold Lang & Kenneth Tynan. The Quest for Corbett. Written for radio. Presentation by Franciszka Themerson. 1960
- Anatol Stern. Europa. Facsimile reproduction of one of the first Polish futurist poems, 1925. Translated from the Polish by Michael Horovitz and Stefan Themerson. illustrated with stills from the Themersons' lost film of 1932. 1962
- Bertrand Russell. History of the World in Epitome (For use in Martian infant schools). 1962
- Franciszka and Stefan Themerson. Semantic Divertissements. 1962
- Stefan Themerson. Bayamus and the Theatre of Semantic Poetry. A semantic novel. 1965
- Franciszka Themerson. Traces of Living. Drawings. 1969
- Stefan Themerson. Special Branch. A novel. 1972
- Stefan Themerson. St. Francis and the Wolf of Gubbio, or Brother Francis' Lamb Chops. An opera. 1972
- Stefan Themerson. Logic, Labels & Flesh. 11 essays. 1974
- Stefan Themerson. The Urge to Create Visions. Essay on film. 1983
- Nicholas Wadley, ed. The Drawings of Franciszka Themerson, 1991
- Stefan Themerson. Collected Poems. 1997
- Franciszka Themerson & Stefan Themerson, Unposted Letters. correspondence, diaries, drawings, documents 1940-42. Gaberbocchus & De Harmonie. 2013

== Other books illustrated by Franciszka Themerson ==
- May d' Alençon, Tricoti Tricota. (as Françoise Themerson). Paris. 1939
- May d' Alençon, Le Cochon Aerodynamique. (as Françoise Themerson). Paris. 1939
- Forty drawings for friends : London 1940-1942 privately printed. 1943
- Mary Fielding Moore: The Lion Who Ate Tomatoes, and other stories. Sylvan Press. 1945.
- Lewis Carroll, Through the Looking Glass and What Alice Found There, 1946, (first published Inky Parrot Press. 2001).
- My First Nursery Book. George G. Harrap & Co., 1947; Tate 2008.
- Jan Brzechwa, Jehla s nitkou tancovala / Tancowala Igla z nitka. (as F. Themersonová). Praha / Warszava. 1948
- Ronald Bottrall, The Palissades of Fear. Editions Poetry London. 1949
- Aesop, The Eagle & the Fox, and the Fox & the Eagle. Gaberbocchus 1949
- Stefan Themerson, Mr Rouse Builds His House. Gaberbocchus. 1950
- Stephen Leacock, The Unicorn Leacock. Hutchinson, 1960.
- Franciszka Themerson, UBU. a comic strip, Bobbs-Merrill, New York, 1970 (other, translated editions, 1983-2014)
- Franciszka Themerson, London 1941-42. privately printed 1987
- Franciszka Themerson, Music. A Suite of Drawings. Themerson archive. 1998.
- Franciszka Themerson, A view of the World: Drawings by Franciszka Themerson. Obscure Publications. 2001
- Stefan Themerson (trans. Barbara Wright), Fragments from Darkness. Obscure Publications. 2001.
- Stefan Themerson, The Table that Ran Away to the Woods. Tate 2012

== Selected exhibitions ==
Themerson began exhibiting her work in the early 1950s, and was included in the London Group, show at New Burlington Galleries in 1951.

She continued to exhibit her work regularly at galleries throughout Europe including London, Paris, New York, Warsaw, Stockholm, Edinburgh and other cities during the following decades. In 1967, her work was included in the British Drawing Today show at the ICA, London. In 1975, she went on to have a one-person show at the Whitechapel Art Gallery, London, titled Franciszka Themerson, It all depends on the point of view.

In 1978, she had a solo exhibition in New York, Franciszka Themerson, paintings, drawings and theatre design, at the Gruenebaum Gallery, and was in a show at the Muzeum Narodowe, Warsaw in 1981-1982. Her work was presented in the Ubu Cent Ans de Règne exhibition at the Musée-Galerie de la Seita. In 1982, the exhibition, Stefan i Franciszka Themerson, Visual Researches was presented at the Muzeum Sztuki w Łodzi in Łodz, Poland, which went on to tour to other venues. She was included in the group exhibition, Presences Polonaises at the Centre Georges Pompidou, Paris in 1983. Her film work in collaboration with her husband Stefan was screened again at the Pompidou in 2009-2010, and in 2021.

The work of the Themersons was presented in 1989 in the Minnesutställning : Themersons show at the Marionettmuseet, Stockholm. She had a retrospective exhibition, The Drawings of Franciszka Themerson at the Nordjyllands Kunstmuseum, in Aalborg in 1991, followed by a solo show in 1992, Franciszka Themerson Drawings at the Gardner Centre, University of Sussex, Falmer. In 1993, Lines from Life, the art of Franciszka Themerson was organized for the Foyer Galleries, Level 2, Royal Festival Hall, London.

Also from 1993, exhibitions featuring the work of the Themersons and Gaberbocchus Press include: The Themersons and the Gaberbocchus Press, an Experiment in Publishing 1948-1979 — La Boetie, New York, 1993, and Gaberbocchus Press at The Poetry Library, Royal Festival Hall, London; and in 1996 Gaberbocchus Press, un éditeur non conformiste 1948-1979 was presented at Galerie Colbert, Bibliothèque nationale de France, Paris, 23 January - 24 February 1996. Also in 1996, an exhibition of her letters, Franciszka Themerson: Unposted Letters 1940-42 was shown at the Imperial War Museum, London.

In 2009, Tate Britain, London presented Lightbox: Stefan & Franciszka Themerson, where several of her works are held in the permanent collection. In 2012, Themerson & Themerson, two exhibitions was featured at the Muzeum Mazowieckie, Płock; and the ICA London presented The Themersons & Gaberbocchus Press. The following year, Muzeum Sztuki w Łodzi, held the show, The Themersons and the Avant-Garde. In 2016, Franciszka & Stefan Themerson: Books, Camera, Ubu was presented at the Camden Arts Centre, London; and in 2019, Centre for Contemporary Art, Łaźnia, Gdańsk, featured the show, Franciszka Themerson Lifelines. Films by the Themersons were presented in the London Film Festival, Royal Festival Hall, London.

In 2022 several of her works were in the Barbican Centre exhibition Postwar Modern New Art in Britain 1945-1965. Her 1947 painting "Eleven Persons and One Donkey Moving Forwards" attracted particular comment.

In 2023 her work was included in the exhibition Action, Gesture, Paint: Women Artists and Global Abstraction 1940-1970 at the Whitechapel Gallery in London.

== Collections ==
Themerson's work is held in the permanent collections of the Museum of Modern Art, New York, the Tate Britain Gallery and the Tate Modern, London, the British Museum, (Muzeum Mazowieckie (Płock), and many other collections.

== See also ==
- Stefan Themerson
- Jasia Reichardt
