= Chiesa della Vittorina, Gubbio =

Roman Catholic church in Italy

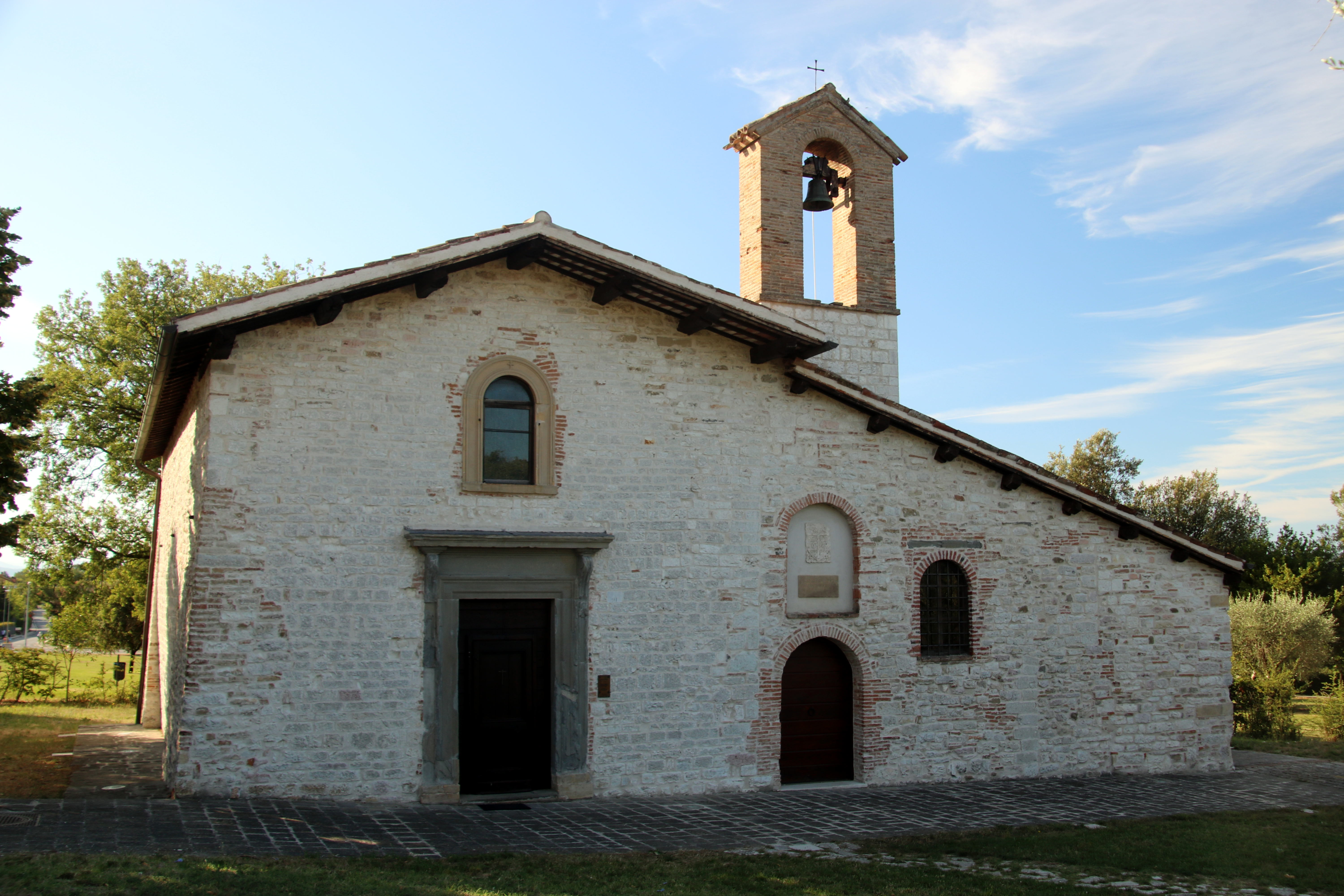
View of facade

The Chiesa della Vittorina (church of the small victory) is a small Roman Catholic shrine built at the site where St Francis of Assisi putatively tamed the Wolf of Gubbio.

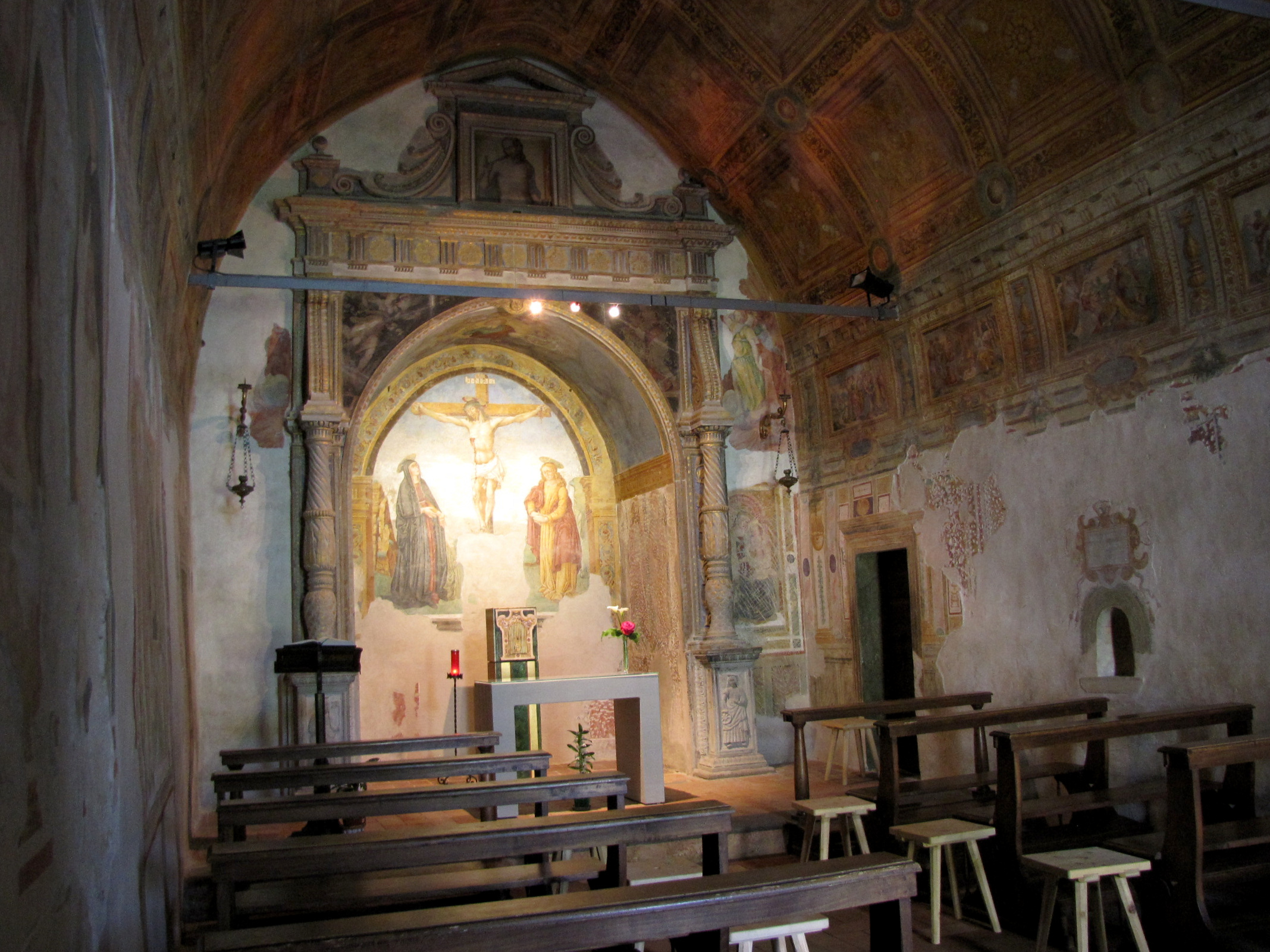
Apse and nave frescoes

A church had been either built or refurbished at the site by either the mid-9th-century or the 13th-century, and it was first populated by early Franciscan order followers. Putatively by 1213 the bishop of Gubbio, Beato Villano, personally transferred the church from the Benedictine order to St Francis for him to house his followers. In 1240–1241, the Franciscans moved to a convent inside the town, and the site was ceded to the female Clarrissan order. In 1538, the nuns ceded the building to the lay Company of Santa Maria della Vittorina. Notably, the church was entirely frescoed in the early 16th century with episodes of the life of the Virgin. Further frescoes were added to lateral walls with votive frescoes. Behind the main altar is a painted Crucifixion attributed to Orlando Merlini. In the lateral chapel to the right are frescoes depicting the Life of St Francis (1639) and a canvas depicting the Madonna col Bambino e Santi painted Giovanni Maria Baldassini.

The site was likely included in one of the 19th-century suppression of monastic orders. In 1948, it was restored to the Franciscan order and reconsecrated in 1957, after decades of restoration. Outside is a bronze bas relief with event of the encounter between the Francis and the wolf (1973) sculpted by Farpi Vignoli. A second bronze monument depicts a standing Francis and the wolf (2002) by Francesco Scalici.
