= Ubu Rock =

Ubu Rock is an American musical by composer/lyricist Rusty Magee, with a book by Andrei Belgrader, and Shelley Berc, based on Alfred Jarry's controversial 1896 French play Ubu Roi. It had its premiere on June 2, 1995 at the American Repertory Theater in Cambridge, Massachusetts. It ran through July 16, 1995 and then again from March 13 to March 23, 1996.

== Plot and production ==
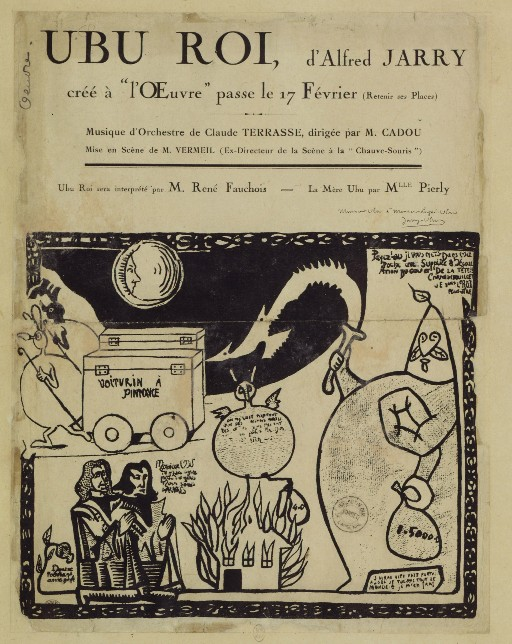
1st ed. cover of Jarry's Ubu Roi

At the urging of Ma Ubu, Pa Ubu seizes power by deposing the royal family of Poland. When the Polish population revolts against the Ubus' kakistocracy, Ma and Pa must flee to America.

In honor of Ubu Roi's controversial first word ("merdre"), the show began with an uptempo vocal jazz song, sung by the chorus, with just one lyric: "Shit."

During a war scene, the show features a lengthy "Button Song", in which General Lasky, head of the Polish Infantry, insisted that his troops sing a military cadence involving an increasingly large number of buttons on his jacket. During the American Repertory Theater production run, audience members routinely threw programs, bottles of water, food, and other items at the actors during this scene (angering Lasky and leading him to restart at one button).

== Reception ==
The Boston Globe called the show "scatological, sexually puerile and deliberately offensive, even in the Beavis and Butt-Head age", but said it was "the most entertaining and provocative production of the American Repertory Theatre schedule." It similarly praised the 1996 return engagement as "a hands-down, hilarious sendup of contemporary mores and modern musicals."

Artforum International said: "More freewheeling romp than Artaudian bit of cruelty, this musical-theater piece, a burlesque of pop-culture quotations, self-reflexivity, and good old-fashioned scatology, blunts what was once cutting edge," while praising its sight gags as "supremely innovative".

== Musical numbers ==
Act I

- Opening Song (Shit)
- Get What You Want
- We'll Kill Him Good
- My Son
- Song of the Ancestors
- I Am the Dicktator
- We Love Pa Ubu
- Wrong is Just the Same as Right
- I Am Everything There Is
- The Rat Sarabande

Act II

- Let's Go To War
- Ubu Chant
- The Button Song
- Back Together Again
- A New Land is Waiting
- Postlude

== Roles ==
Role	Premiere cast June 2, 1995
Pa Ubu	Charles Levin
Ma Ubu	Francine Torres
Captain Trash/General Lasky	Thomas Derrah
King's Messenger/Ladislas/Dregadier McShovit	Kevin Waldron
King Wenceslas/Dregadier McGreedy	Will LeBow
Queen Rosamond	Adrianne Krstansky
Bouggerslas	Ajay Naidu
Ballseslas/Dregadier McBalls/Lord de Konigsburg/Stanislas Leczinski/Tsar	Scott Ripley
Florenslas	Kerri Aldrich
Ralpheslas/Trash's Messenger/Tax Collector	J.C. Murad
Maria Leczinski	Marni Ratner
Eva Leczinski	Monique Wegele
Tax Collector/Jan Sobieski	John-Andrew Morrison

== Subsequent productions ==
Ubu Rock was performed in 2006 at John Jay College and, in 2008, as an "interactive theater" production by Empty Set Productions in San Francisco.
