= Jakub Weinles =

Polish painter

- Born: Jakub Weinles; 1870; Starokostiantyniv, Russian Empire
- Died: 1938 (aged 67–68); Warsaw, Poland
- Education: School of Fine Arts in Warsaw
- Known for: Painting
- Movement: Realism, Symbolism

Jakub Weinles (1870, Starokostiantyniv – 1938, Warsaw) was a Polish painter of Jewish ancestry, creating art around Jewish culture, and an active participant of the Jewish Society of the Nurture of Fine Arts (Yiddish: Jidiszer Gezelszaft cu Farszprajnt Kunst, Polish: Żydowskie Towarzystwo Krzewienia Sztuk Pięknych).

Weinles studied at Wojciech Gerson's art class, and at the School of Fine Arts in Warsaw in the 1890s. He completed art workshops with Szymon Hollosy in Munich. In 1898, he returned to Warsaw where he painted with other Jewish painters. His wife was Łucja from the House of Kaufman, with whom he had two daughters: Franciszka Themerson, also a painter and Maria Chajnik. He is buried at the Jewish Cemetery in Warsaw; however, his headstone has not survived.

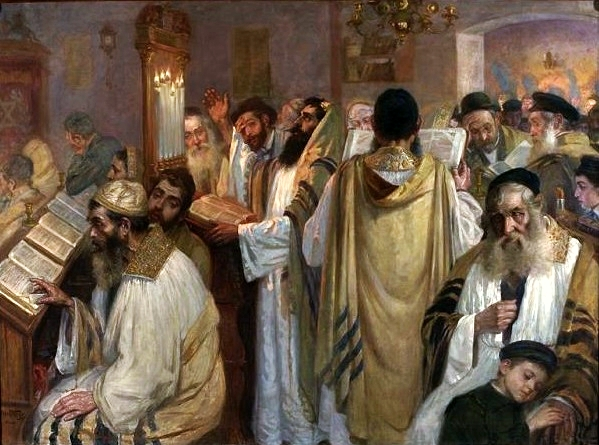
On the Eve of Yom Kippur

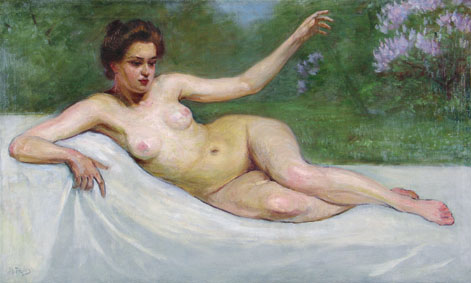
Nude

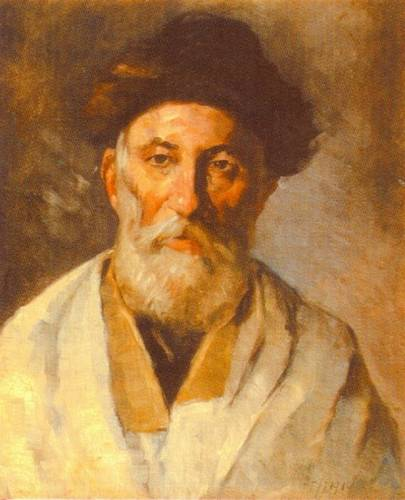
Portrait of a Jew
