= Uitgeverij De Harmonie =

Dutch publisher

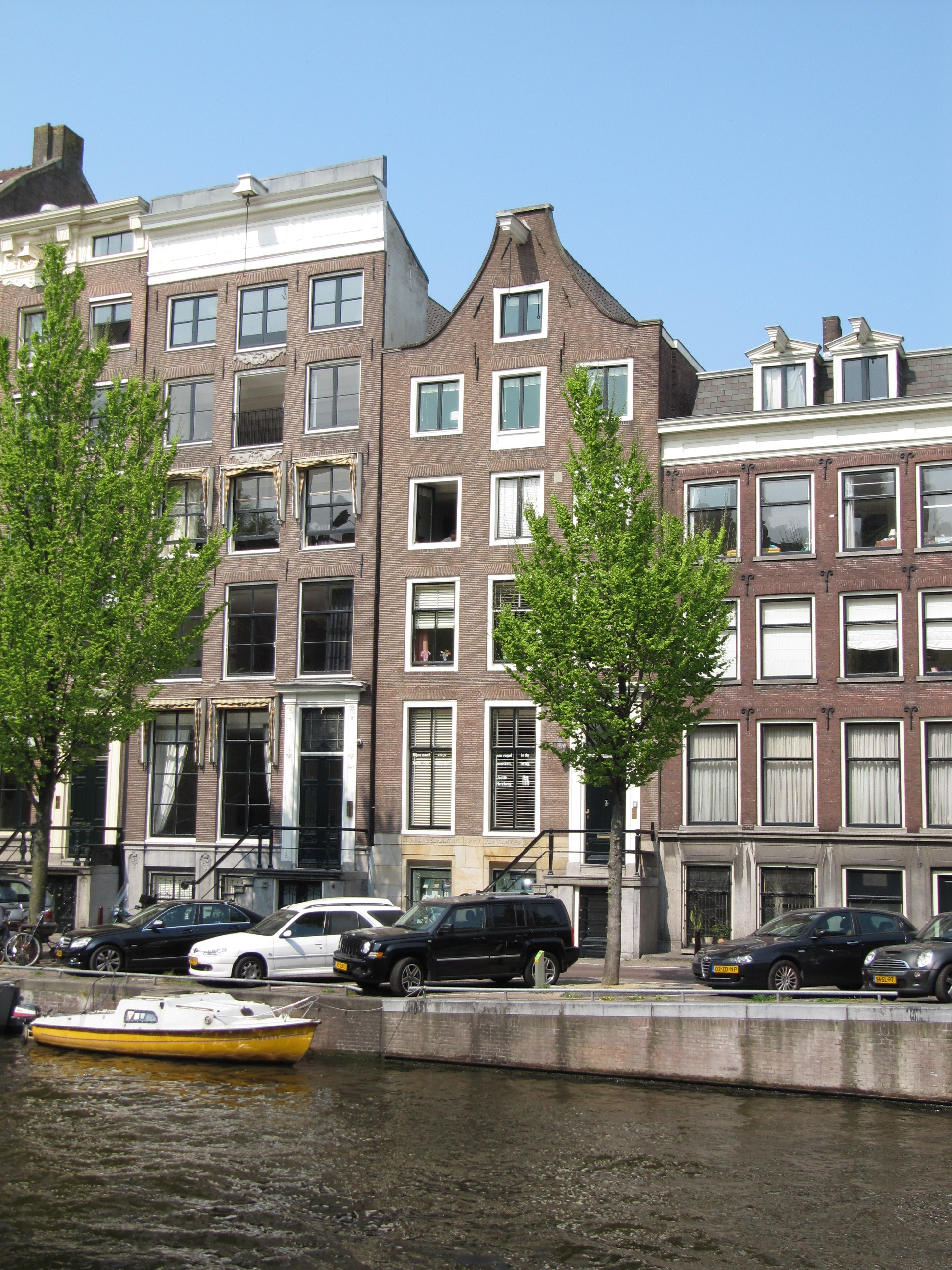
- Herengracht 555, current location of De Harmonie
- Founded: 1972
- Founder: Jaco Groot and Elisabeth Groot
- Country of origin: Netherlands
- Headquarters location: Amsterdam
- Publication types: Books
- Official website: www.deharmonie.nl

De Harmonie is a Dutch publishing company best known today as the publisher of the Harry Potter series of books since the 1990s, though their largest success didn't come until the 2000s and since 14 February 2008 they are located on Herengracht in Amsterdam.

The company was founded in 1972 by Jaco Groot and his wife Elisabeth, and publishes 30-40 new titles per year, mostly visually-oriented material such as illustrated children's books, comics and art books, but also poetry and prose. Choices whom to publish are still made by the founders, though from an attic room on the Singel they have come a long way since Harry Potter.

Other authors besides J.K. Rowling whose works they have published are Wim de Bie, Jan Blokker, Hugo Brandt Corstius, Arjan Ederveen, Karel Eykman, Jonas Geirnaert, Elma van Haren, Elke Heidenreich, Willem Frederik Hermans, Judith Herzberg, Isol, Freek de Jonge, Kamagurka, Hanco Kolk, Kees van Kooten, Kim van Kooten, Gerrit Kouwenaar, Jhumpa Lahiri, David Leavitt, Nicolaas Matsier, Colum McCann, Ian McEwan, Rebecca Miller, Joshua Mowll, Carel Peeters, Daniel Pennac, Ethel Portnoy, Frederick Reiken, Keith Ridgway, Jess Row, Wim T. Schippers, Herr Seele, Tom Sharpe, Posy Simmonds, Matthew Skelton, Ronald Snijders, Art Spiegelman, Peter van Straaten, Joost Swarte, Jacques Tardi, Stefan Themerson, Franciszka Themerson, Oyvind Torseter, Henny Vrienten, Elly de Waard, Wallace & Gromit, Ursus Wehrli, Micha Wertheim, and Peter de Wit.

The name of the company, which is a Dutch term for a marching band, resulted from an open naming contest in the Dutch paper Vrij Nederland and the poet Remco Campert won with his suggestion. Ever since he has received yearly a copy of all the books that the company produces. Campert's works are published by their literary competitor De Bezige Bij, which became part of the Weekbladpersgroep in 1997. Other Amsterdam-based competitors De Arbeiderspers and Querido have also become part of this larger publishing conglomerate. De Harmonie managed to stay afloat as an independent publisher during the 1990s mostly because they had only expanded their small staff from 2 to 4 over the years, and have experimented early with new media such as cd-roms and internet media. They maintain the Dutch Harry Potter website and the online archive of Gaberbocchus Press.
