= Gwen Barnard =

British artist (1912-1988)

- Born: 1912
- Died: 1988 (aged 75–76)
- Known for: Painting

Gwen Barnard (1912–1988) was a British artist notable for her ability as a painter and printmaker. Barnard's early paintings were naturalistic and with time her approach became more abstract, throughout her career rock shapes and river scenes, particularly of the River Thames, were constant themes.

== Biography ==
Barnard studied at the Chelsea School of Art between 1931 and 1935 and then at the Euston Road School in 1937 and 1938. Her first solo exhibition was at the Beaux Arts Gallery in London. She contributed works to group exhibitions and had further solo shows hosted by the Artists' International Association, at the Camden Arts Centre in 1976, the Upper Street Gallery in London and at overseas venues. In 1955 she illustrated Shapes of the River, a book on the Thames. The book was published by the Gaberbocchus Press of which Barnard was a director and for whom she illustrated several volumes.

Barnard was a member of the Women's International Art Club and served as the Club's chair for a time. She was also a member of the Royal Institute of Oil Painters. For many years Barnard lived in Hampstead in north London and wrote a history of the local Mall Studios, where she worked, for the Camden History Review in 1980.
