= Ubu Roi =

1896 play by Alfred Jarry

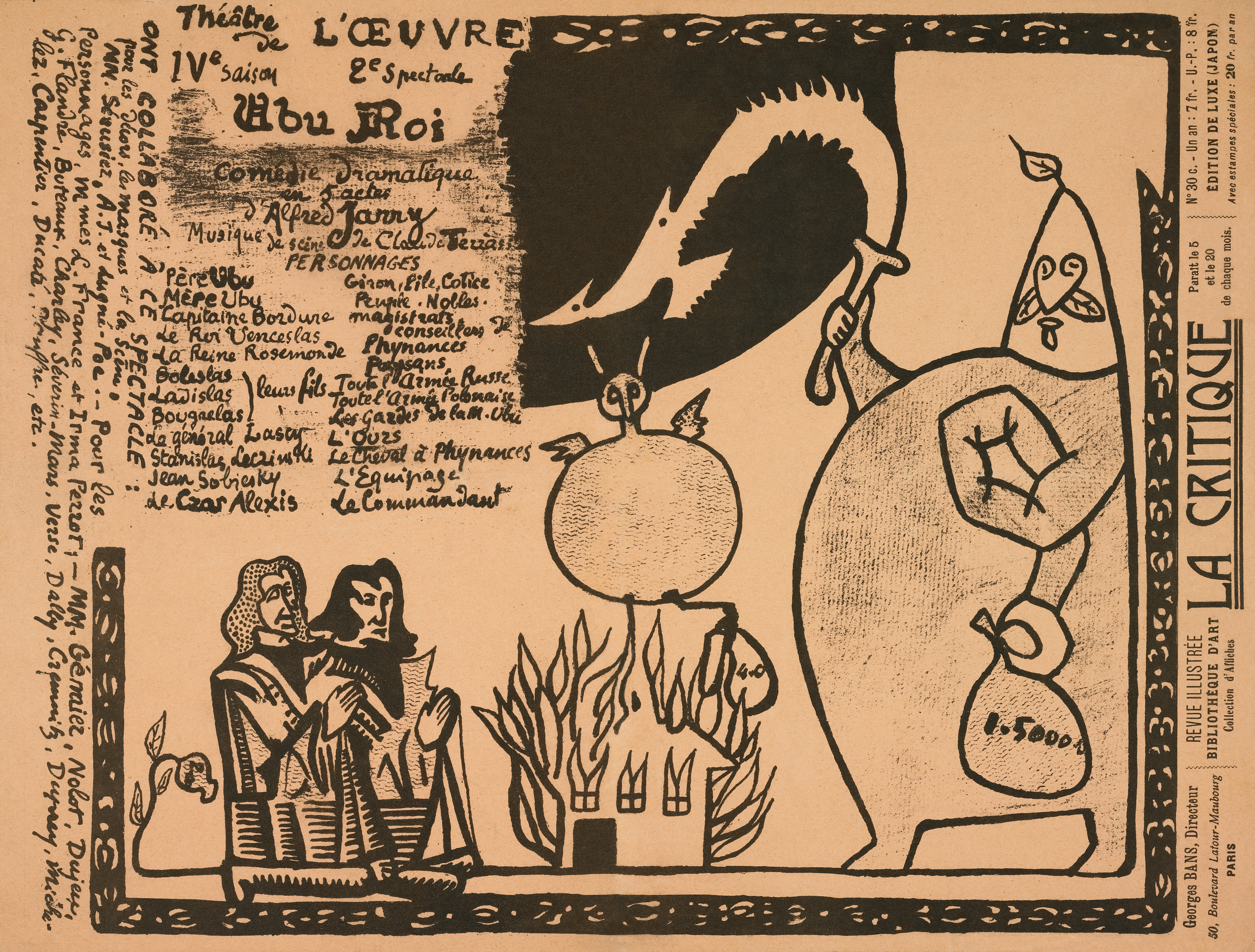
- Programme from the première
- Original language: French
- Written by: Alfred Jarry
- Series: Ubu Cocu; Ubu Enchaîné

Premiere
- Date: December 10, 1896
- Place: Paris

Ubu Roi (French: [yby ʁwa]; "Ubu the King" or "King Ubu") is a play by French writer Alfred Jarry, then 23 years old. It was first performed in Paris in 1896, by Aurélien Lugné-Poe's Théâtre de l'Œuvre at the Nouveau-Théâtre (today, the Théâtre de Paris). The production's single public performance baffled and offended audiences with its unruliness and obscenity. A wild, bizarre and comic play, significant for its overturning of cultural rules, norms and conventions, it is regarded by 20th- and 21st-century scholars as having opened the door for what became known as modernism in the 20th century, and as a precursor to Dadaism, Surrealism and the Theatre of the Absurd.

== Overview ==
Ubu Roi was first performed in Paris on December 10, 1896, by Aurélien Lugné-Poe's Théâtre de l'Œuvre at Nouveau-Théâtre (today, the Théâtre de Paris), 15, rue Blanche, in the 9th arrondissement. The play – scheduled for an invited "industry" run-through followed by a single public performance the next night – caused a riotous response in the audience and denunciatory reviews in the days after. It is considered a wild, bizarre and comic play, significant for the way it overturns cultural rules, norms, and conventions. To some of those who were in the audience on opening night, including W. B. Yeats and the poet and essayist Catulle Mendès, it seemed an event of revolutionary importance, but many were mystified and outraged by the work's seeming childishness, obscenity, and disrespect. It is now seen by some to have opened the door for what became known as modernism in the 20th century. It is a precursor to Dada, Surrealism and the Theatre of the Absurd. It is the first of three stylised burlesques in which Jarry satirises power, greed, and their evil practice – in particular the propensity of the complacent bourgeoisie to abuse the authority engendered by success.

The title is sometimes translated as King Turd; however, the word "Ubu" is actually merely a nonsense word that evolved from the French pronunciation of the name "Hebert", which was the name of one of Jarry's teachers, the satirical target and inspiration of the first versions of the play.

Jarry made some suggestions regarding how his play should be performed. He wanted King Ubu to wear a cardboard horse's head in certain scenes, "as in the old English theatre", for he intended to "write a guignol". He thought a "suitably costumed person would enter, as in puppet shows, to put up signs indicating the locations of the various scenes". He also wanted costumes with as little specific local colour reference or historical accuracy as possible.

Ubu Roi was followed by Ubu Cocu (Ubu Cuckolded) and Ubu Enchaîné (Ubu in Chains), neither of which was performed during Jarry's 34-year life. One of his later works, a novel/essay on "pataphysics", is offered as an explanation behind the ideas that underpin Ubu Roi. Pataphysics is, as Jarry explains, "the science of the realm beyond metaphysics". Pataphysics is a pseudo-science Jarry created to critique members of the academy. It studies the laws that "govern exceptions and will explain the universe supplementary to this one". It is the "science of imaginary solutions".

== Cast ==
Personnages

- Père Ubu
- Mère Ubu
- Capitaine Bordure
- Le Roi Venceslas, La Reine Rosemonde
- Boleslas, Bougrelas, Ladislas – leurs fils
- Le général Lascy
- Stanislas Leczinski
- Jean Sobieski
- Nicolas Rensky
- L'Empereur Alexis
- Giron, Pile, Cotice – Palotins
- La Machine à décerveler
- Le Commandant
- Michel Fédérovitch
- Nobles
- Magistrats
- Financiers
- Conseillers
- Toute l'Armée russe
- Toute l'Armée polonaise
- Les Gardes de la Mère Ubu
- Un Capitaine
- L'Ours
- Le Cheval à Phynances
- L'Equipage
- Conjurés & Soldats
- Peuple
- Larbins de Phynances
- Paysans

Characters

- Papa Ubu
- Mama Ubu
- Captain Bordure
- King Wenceslas and Queen Rosemonde
- Their sons Boleslas, Boggerlas, and Ladislas
- General Laski
- Stanislas Leczinsky
- Johannes Sobiesky
- Nicholas Rensky
- Emperor Alexei
- Palotins: Giron, Pile, Cotice
- The Disembraining Machine
- The Ship's Captain
- Michael Fedorovitch
- Nobles
- Magistrates
- Phynanciers
- Councilors
- The Whole Russian Army
- The Whole Polish Army
- Mama Ubu's Guards
- A Captain
- A Bear
- The Phynancial Horse
- The Crew
- Conspirators and Soldiers
- Crowds
- Lackeys of Phynance
- Peasants

== Synopsis ==
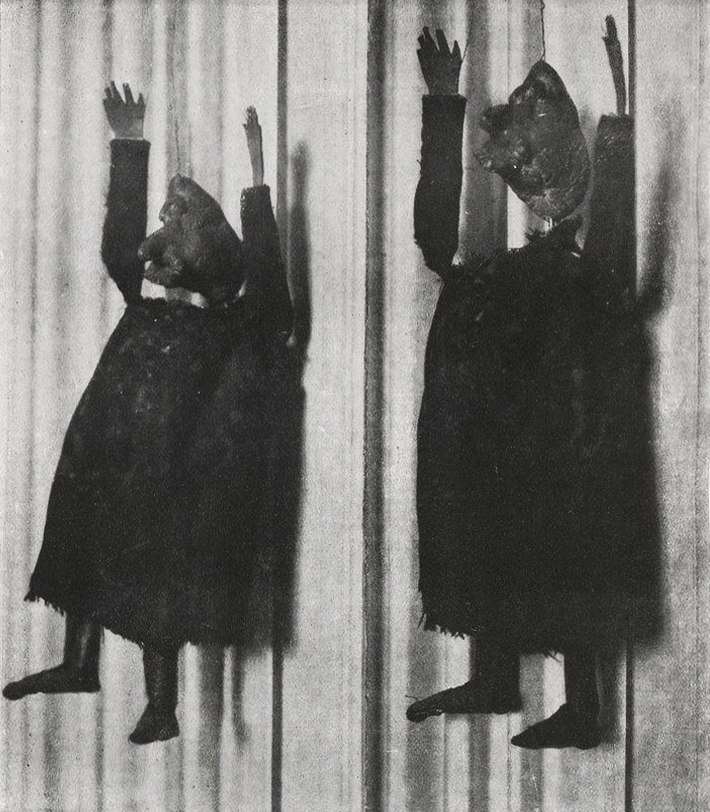
Alfred Jarry, Deux aspects de la marionnette originale d'Ubu Roi, premiered at the Théâtre de l'Œuvre on 10 December 1896

The story is a parody of Shakespeare's Macbeth and some parts of Hamlet and King Lear.

As the play begins, Ubu's wife convinces him to lead a revolution, and kills the King of Poland and most of the royal family. The King's son, Bougrelas, and the Queen escape, but the latter later dies. The ghost of the dead king appears to his son and calls for revenge. Back at the palace, Ubu, now King, begins heavily taxing the people and killing the nobles for their wealth. Ubu's henchman gets thrown into prison; he then escapes to Russia, where he has the Tsar declare war on Ubu. As Ubu heads out to confront the invading Russians, his wife tries to steal the money and treasures in the palace. She is driven away by Bougrelas, who is leading a revolt of the people against Ubu. She runs away to her husband, Ubu, who has, in the meantime, been defeated by the Russians, been abandoned by his followers, and been attacked by a bear. Ubu's wife pretends to be the angel Gabriel, in order to try to scare Ubu into forgiving her for her attempt to steal from him. They fight, and she is rescued by the entrance of Bougrelas, who is after Ubu. Ubu knocks down the attackers with the body of the dead bear, after which he and his wife flee to France, which ends the play.

The action contains motifs found in the plays of Shakespeare: a king's murder and a scheming wife from Macbeth, the ghost from Hamlet, Fortinbras' revolt from Hamlet, the reneging of Buckingham's reward from Richard III, and the pursuing bear from The Winter's Tale. It also includes other cultural references, for example, to Sophocles' Oedipus Rex (Œdipe Roi in French) in the play's title. Ubu Roi is considered a descendant of the comic grotesque French Renaissance author François Rabelais and his Gargantua and Pantagruel novels.

The language of the play is a unique mix of slang code-words, puns and near-gutter vocabulary, set to strange speech patterns.

== Development ==
"The beginnings of the original Ubu", writes Jane Taylor, "have attained the status of legend within French theatre culture". In 1888, when he became a student at the Lycée in Rennes at the age of fifteen, Jarry encountered a brief farcical sketch, Les Polonais, written by his friend Henri Morin, and Henri's brother Charles. This farce was part of a campaign by the students to ridicule their physics teacher, Félix-Frederic Hébert (1832–1917). Les Polonais depicted their teacher as the King of an imaginary Poland, and was one of many plays created around Père Hébé, the character that, in Jarry's hands, eventually evolved into King Ubu. Les Polonais was performed as a marionette play by the students at their homes in what they called the "Theatre des Phynances", named in honor of Père Hébert's lust for "phynance" (finance), or money. This prototype for Ubu Roi is long-lost, so the true and complete details of the authorship of Ubu Roi may never be known. It is clear, however, that Jarry considerably revised and expanded the play.

While his schoolmates lost interest in the Ubu legends when they left school, Jarry continued adding to and reworking the material for the rest of his short life. His plays are controversial for their scant respect to royalty, religion and society, their vulgarity and scatology, their brutality and low comedy, and their perceived utter lack of literary finish.

== Ubu ==
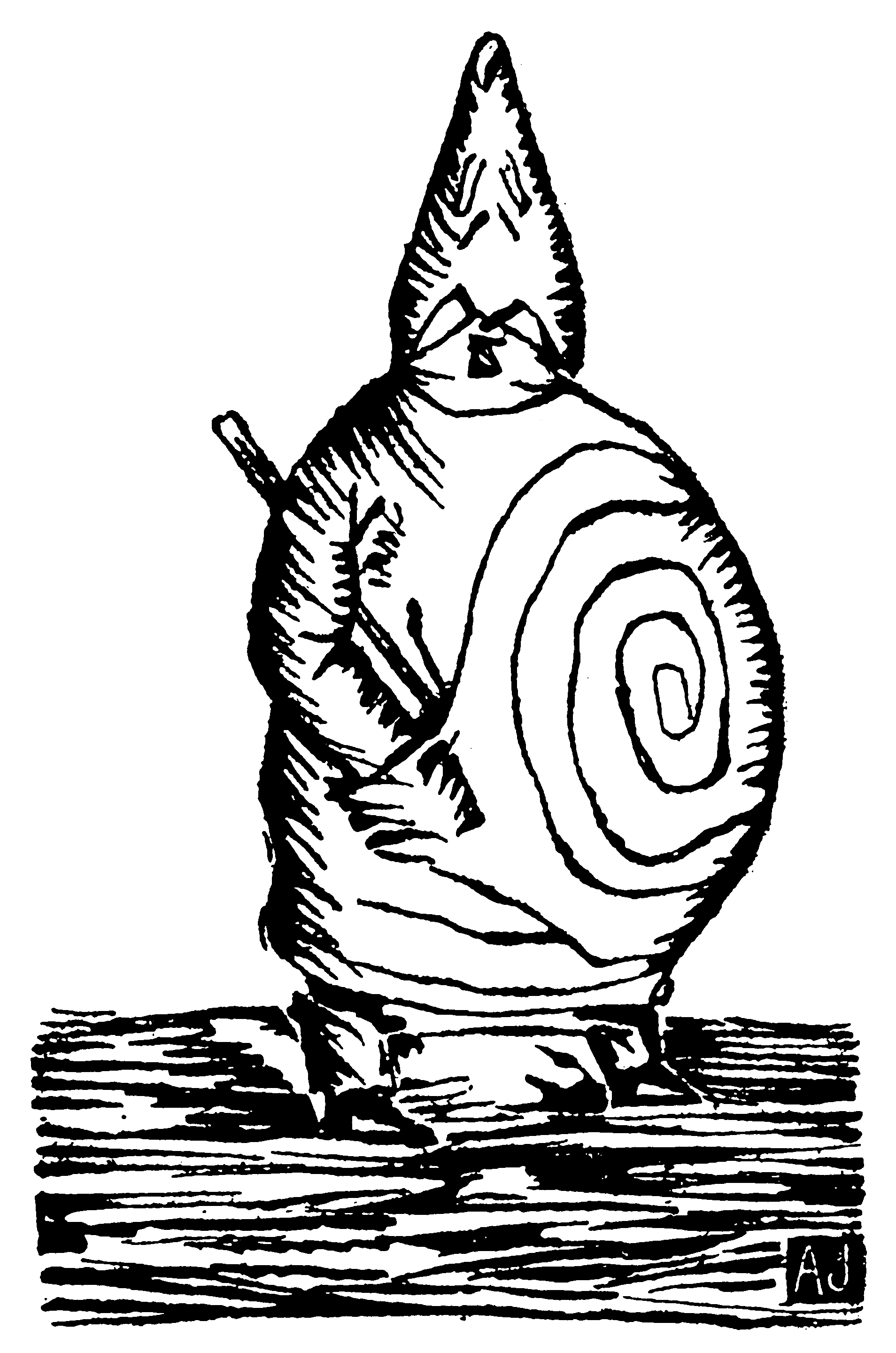
Jarry's woodcut of Ubu

According to Jane Taylor, "the central character is notorious for his infantile engagement with his world. Ubu inhabits a domain of greedy self-gratification". Jarry's metaphor for the modern man, he is an antihero – fat, ugly, vulgar, gluttonous, grandiose, dishonest, stupid, jejune, voracious, greedy, cruel, cowardly and evil – who grew out of schoolboy legends about the imaginary life of a hated teacher who had been at one point a slave on a Turkish galley, at another frozen in ice in Norway and at one more the King of Poland. Ubu Roi follows and explores his political, martial and felonious exploits.

"There is", writes Taylor, "a particular kind of pleasure for an audience watching these infantile attacks. Part of the satisfaction arises from the fact that in the burlesque mode which Jarry invents, there is no place for consequence. While Ubu may be relentless in his political aspirations, and brutal in his personal relations, he apparently has no measurable effect upon those who inhabit the farcical world which he creates around himself. He thus acts out our most childish rages and desires, in which we seek to gratify ourselves at all cost". The derived adjective "ubuesque" is recurrent in French and francophone political debate.

== Première ==
Both Ubu Cocu and Ubu Roi have a convoluted history, going through decades of rewriting and, in the case of the former, never arriving, despite Jarry's exertions, at a definitive version. By the time Jarry wanted Ubu Roi published and staged, the Morins had lost their interest in schoolboy japes, and Henri gave Jarry permission to do whatever he wanted with them. Charles, however, later tried to claim credit, but it had never been a secret that he had had some involvement with the earliest version. The music was composed and performed at the premiere by Claude Terrasse.

The first word of the play ("merdre", the French word for "shit", with an extra "r") may have been part of the reason for the response to the play in Paris. At the end of the performance a riot broke out, an incident which has since become "a stock element of Jarry biographia". After this, Ubu Roi was outlawed from the stage, and Jarry moved it to a puppet theatre.

Jarry said to the audience in a curtain speech just before that first performance in Paris: "You are free to see in M. Ubu however many allusions you care to, or else a simple puppet—a school boy's caricature of one of his teachers who personified for him all the ugliness in the world".

The poet W. B. Yeats, though he did not understand French, attended the premiere with a companion who interpreted the action for him. He recalled, in his memoir The Trembling of the Veil, his dismay that the play challenged the symbolist, spiritual-themed literature he advocated: "Feeling bound to support the most spirited party, we have shouted for the play, but that night at the Hotel Corneille I am very sad, for comedy, objectivity, has displayed its growing power once more. I say, 'After Stéphane Mallarmé, after Paul Verlaine, after Gustave Moreau, after Puvis de Chavannes, after our own verse, after all our subtle colour and nervous rhythm, after the faint mixed tints of Conder, what more is possible? After us the Savage God.'”

== Adaptations ==
=== 20th century ===
In 1936 Tadeusz Boy-Żeleński, the great Polish modernist and prolific writer and translator created in Polish Ubu Król czyli Polacy ("King Ubu, otherwise, The Poles"). Some of his phraseology in the play has passed into the language. In 1990, at the invitation of the Munich Opera, Krzysztof Penderecki wrote an opera buffa on Jarry's theme entitled Ubu Rex, staged on 8 July 1991 for the opening of the Munich Opera Festival; the opera was later mounted in Poland in 2003.

The first English translation was Ubu Roi. Drama in Five acts followed by the Song of Disembraining, by Barbara Wright, for which she wrote the preface. It was illustrated by Franciszka Themerson and published by the Gaberbocchus Press in 1951.

In 1964 the Stockholm Puppet theatre produced a highly popular version of Ubu Roi directed by Michael Meschke, with scenery by Franciszka Themerson.

Ubu Roi was translated into Serbian in 1964 by Ljubomir Draškić and performed at the Atelje 212 theatre in Belgrade for the next 20 years, until Zoran Radmilović, who played Père Ubu, died. The play was so successful that it was adapted into a movie in 1973.

Ubu Roi was translated into Czech by Jiří Voskovec and Jan Werich as Král Ubu, and premiered in 1928 at Osvobozené divadlo. The play was banned in Czechoslovakia after the 1968 Soviet invasion.

The play was the basis for Jan Lenica's animated film Ubu et la Grande Gidouille (1976).

In 1976–1977 Oakley Hall III translated and adapted Ubu Roi (called Ubu Rex) and its sequels, and directed them in New York City Off-Off-Broadway and at the Lexington Conservatory Theatre in Lexington, New York. The adaptations starred Richard Zobel, who also produced the play and created the masks for it.

In Lithuania (then part of the USSR) the play was adapted as Karalius Ūbas by director Jonas Vaitkus in 1983.

The play was adapted into an opera, with libretto by Michael Finnissy and Andrew Toovey and music by Toovey. It was produced by the Banff Centre Theatre, Canada, in collaboration with Music Theatre Wales, in May 1992, directed by Keith Turnbull.

A musical adaptation, Ubu Rock, book by Andrei Belgrader and Shelly Berc, music and lyrics by Rusty Magee, premiered at the American Repertory Theater in 1995 and was remounted at ART the following year.

The play was adapted for the Czech film Král Ubu, directed by F. A. Brabec in 1996. The film received three Czech Lion Awards.

Sherry C. M. Lindquist's adaptation was performed in Chicago, at The Public Theater in New York City, at the International Festival of Puppet Theater, and at the Edison Theater, St. Louis, Missouri, by Hystopolis Productions, Chicago, from 1996 to 1997.

Jane Taylor adapted Ubu Roi as Ubu and the Truth Commission (1998), a play addressing the emotional complexities revealed by the process of the South African Truth and Reconciliation Commission, which was formed in response to the atrocities committed during apartheid.

=== 21st century ===
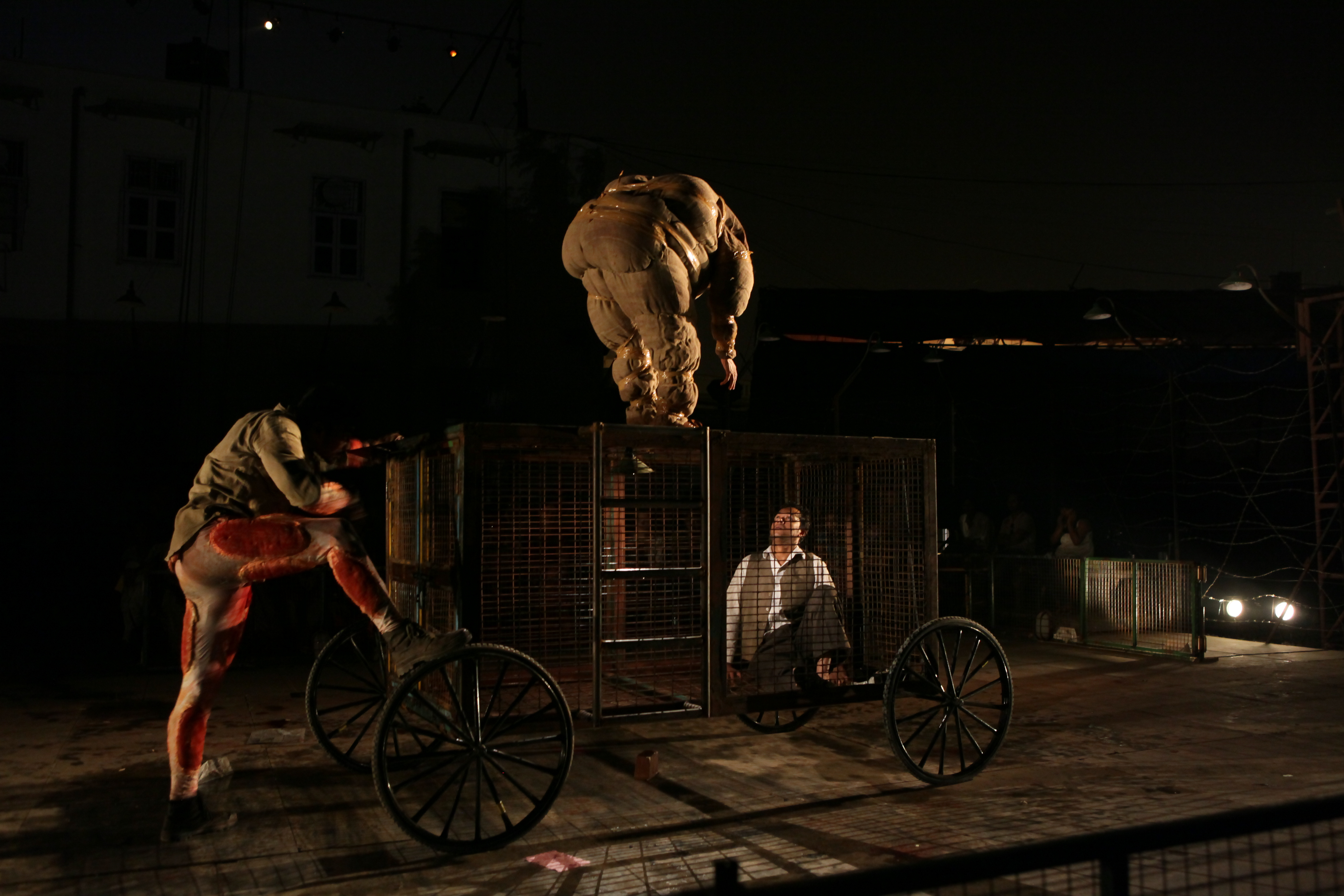
2012 production of Ubu Roi, produced by the National School of Drama (New Delhi) and directed by Deepan Sivaraman

In Poland the play was adapted for the film Ubu Król (2003) by Piotr Szulkin, highlighting the grotesque nature of political life in Poland immediately after the fall of communism.

The play was translated by David Ball in The Norton Anthology of Drama in 2010, and performed at the University of Virginia the same year.

Inspired by the black comedy of corruption within Ubu Roi, the Puerto Rican absurdist narrative United States of Banana (2011) by Giannina Braschi dramatizes, with over-the-top grotesque flourishes of "pataphysics", the fall of the American Empire and the liberation of Puerto Rico.

The play was adapted and directed by Dash Kruck as part of Vena Cava Production's 2013 mainstage season. Performed in Brisbane, Australia, the adaptation made cultural political references to Queensland's Premier Campbell Newman, even including him in the show's promotional poster.

In 2013, the international theatre company Cheek by Jowl created a French-language production of Ubu Roi, directed by Declan Donnellan and designed by Nick Ormerod. The production was presented across Europe, Russia, the United-States and Mexico. It was live-streamed worldwide from the Lincoln Center in New York on 26 July 2015. According to The New York Times "the Cheek by Jowl production asks us to see Jarry’s play through the eyes of a sulky, moody, sexually tormented adolescent, who is pitilessly judgmental of his elders."

In 2014, Toronto's One Little Goat Theatre Company produced Ubu Mayor: A Harmful Bit of Fun, combining the merde-filled sensibilities of Ubu Roi with the internationally renowned antics, absurdities and obscenities of Toronto's mayor Rob Ford and his brother Doug.

In 2014, the play was adapted into experimental musical production Ubu Sings Ubu, which incorporated music by similarly-inspired rock group Pere Ubu. Ubu Sings Ubu was presented for an encore in 2016.

In 2016, the play was adapted by Jared Strange into UBU ROY: An American Tale, an updated version of the original play through the lens of the 2016 United States presidential election. The show opened November 3, 2016, in Lubbock, Texas, as the Lubbock Community Theatre's first play in their "LCT After Dark" season.

In 2020, the play was adapted and set in modern-day Tasmania, taking place on a purpose-built stage in the Cataract Gorge.

In 2020, the play was also adapted into a musical by Kneehigh Theatre company.

In 2021, the play was condensed and adapted by Jen Silverman under the title Ubu Anew (A Play for Strange People) and is featured in Silverman's collection Real American Dinner Party & Other Short Plays.

== In literature and the arts ==
Max Ernst, Ubu Imperator, 1923. (Musée National d'Art Moderne, Paris)

In 1923, the Dadaist pioneer Max Ernst produced a painting entitled Ubu Imperator.

Between 1952 and 1953, the King Ubu Gallery existed at 3119 Fillmore Street in San Francisco. Founded by Robert Duncan, Jess Collins, and Harry Jacobus, the gallery was an important institution until it was replaced by the Six Gallery, where Allen Ginsberg first read "Howl."

Alfred Jarry is one of the few real figures to appear among the many literary characters in Les Faux-Monnayeurs (The Counterfeiters, 1925), by André Gide. In Part III, Chapter 8, Jarry attends a literary banquet, where the fictional Comte de Passavant introduces him as the author of Ubu Roi, saying of the literary set, "They have dubbed him a genius because the public have just damned his play. All the same, it's the most interesting thing that's been put on the stage for a long time".

Joan Miró used Ubu Roi as a subject of his 50 lithographs in 1940 called the Barcelona Series. These pictures could be Ubu Roi but they also satirise General Franco and his generals after he had won the Spanish Civil War.

In her book Linda McCartney's Sixties: Portrait of an Era, Linda McCartney mentions that Paul had become interested in avant-garde theatre and immersed himself in the writings of Jarry. This is how McCartney discovered the word "pataphysical", which he used in the lyrics of his song "Maxwell's Silver Hammer".

The American experimental rock group Pere Ubu is named after the main character. Their 2009 album Long Live Père Ubu! is an adaptation of Jarry's play.

Dead Can Dance's frontman Brendan Perry makes a reference to Père Ubu in the song "The Bogus Man" (on his second solo album Ark) with the line "Hail, Father Ubu, here comes the Grand Guignol".

The figure of Ubu Roi, particularly as depicted by Jarry in his woodcut, appears to have inspired the character Oogie Boogie in Tim Burton's animated film The Nightmare Before Christmas.

Television producer Gary David Goldberg named his dog Ubu and his production company Ubu Productions after Ubu Roi.

Australian band Methyl Ethel's song "Ubu" contains references to the play.

The protagonist of Walter Jon Williams' novel Angel Station is named Ubu Roy.

In Paul Auster’s last novel Baumgartner (2023), King Ubu is referenced, alluding to Donald Trump as “the deranged Ubu in the White House”.

== Bibliography ==
- Jarry, Alfred. Ubu Roi. Translated by Barbara Wright and illustrated by Franciszka Themerson. Gaberbocchus Press. 1951
- Jarry, Alfred. Ubu Roi. Translated by David Ball as Ubu the King. [Norton Anthology of Drama, 2010.]
- Jarry, Alfred. Ubu Roi. Translated by Beverly Keith and Gershon Legman. Dover, 2003.
- Innes, Christopher. Avant-Garde Theatre 1892–1992. London and New York: Routledge, 1993. 0415065186.
- Taylor, Jane. Ubu and the Truth Commission. Cape Town: University of Cape Town Press, 2007.
- Pile, Stephen, The Return of Heroic Failures, Harmondsworth, Penguin Books, 1988.
- Fell, Jill: Alfred Jarry: An Inagination in Revolt. Fairleigh Dickinson University Press. 2005
- Brotchie, Alastair. Alfred Jarry, a Pataphysical Life. MIT Press. 2013. ISBN 978 0 262 01619 3
