= Cozette de Charmoy =

British-Canadian artist

Cozette de Charmoy (born 3 August 1939 in London, England) is a British-born Canadian artist and poet.

Her artwork is included in the collections of the National Gallery of Canada, the Museu d'Art Contemporani de Barcelona, the National Museum of Women in the Arts, and the Cape Breton University Art Gallery.

In 1972, she co-founded, along with her husband Rodney de Charmoy Grey, the publishing house Éditions Ottezec.
