= Lodewijk Muns =

Dutch academic and musician

Lodewijk Muns is a Dutch academic, musicologist, author, and musician. He graduated in musicology at the University of Utrecht, and later studied at the Royal Conservatoire of The Hague with pianists Geoffrey Madge and Stanley Hoogland.

He works in a non-tonal (or allusively-tonal) idiom. Pedrillo Botón, a chamber opera for an audience of children and adults, is his only extensive work in a tonal idiom.

He also writes both non fiction and fiction. He is now an independent scholar, lecturer, and musician living in The Hague.

He wrote a soundtrack for the recently rediscovered silent film ''Europa'' in 2021.
