= Wolf of Gubbio =

Story about St. Francis of Assisi

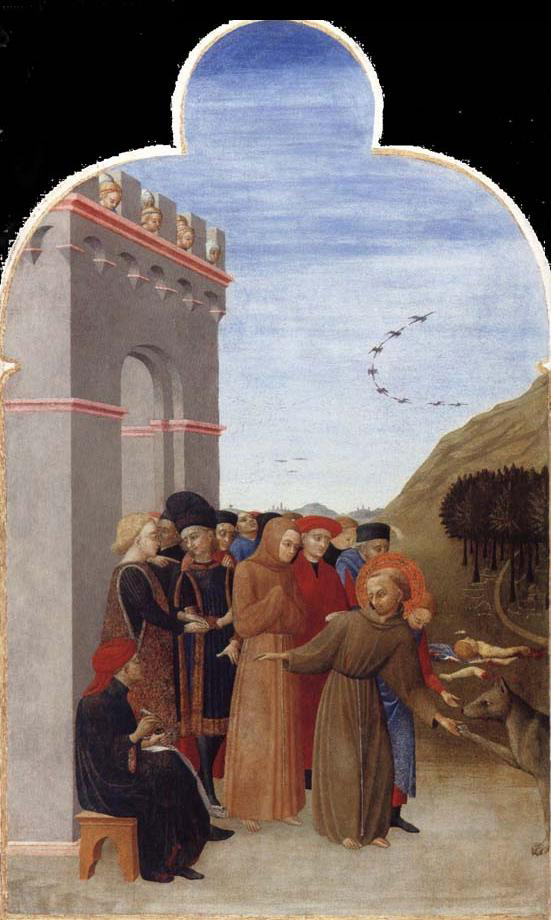
Saint Francis and the wolf of Gubbio, from San Sepolcro Altarpiece (Sassetta, 1437–1444)

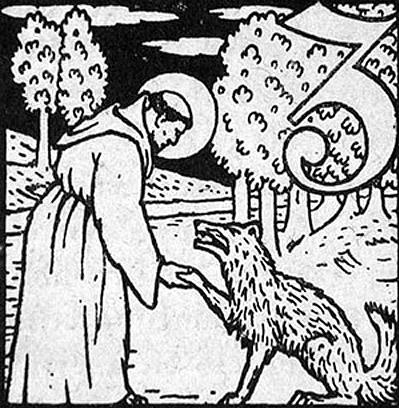
Francis instructing the wolf

The Wolf of Gubbio was a wolf who, according to the Little Flowers of St. Francis, terrorized the Umbrian city of Gubbio until he was tamed by Francis of Assisi acting on behalf of God. The story is one of many in Christian narrative that depicts saints exerting influence over animals and nature, a motif common to hagiography. Unlike many miracle stories of the Middle Ages, there is some physical evidence marking the origin of the story.

== Story ==
During the period around 1220 when Francis was living in Gubbio, a fierce wolf appeared in the country and began attacking livestock. Soon he graduated to direct assaults on humans, and not long after began to feed upon them exclusively. He was known for lingering outside of the city gates in wait for anyone foolish enough to venture beyond them alone. No weapon was capable of hurting him, and all who attempted to destroy him were devoured. Eventually mere sight of him caused the entire city to raise alarm and the public refused to go outside the walls for any reason. It was at this point, when Gubbio was under siege, that Francis announced he was going to take leave and meet the wolf. He was advised against this more than once but, irrespective of the warnings, made the sign of the cross and went beyond the gates with a small group of followers. When he neared the wolf's lair, the crowd held back at a safe distance, but close enough to witness what transpired.

The wolf, having seen the group approach, rushed at Francis with his jaws open. Again Francis made the sign of the cross and commanded the wolf to cease his attacks in the name of God. The wolf trotted to him docilely and lay at his feet, putting his head in Francis' hands. Francis then spoke:

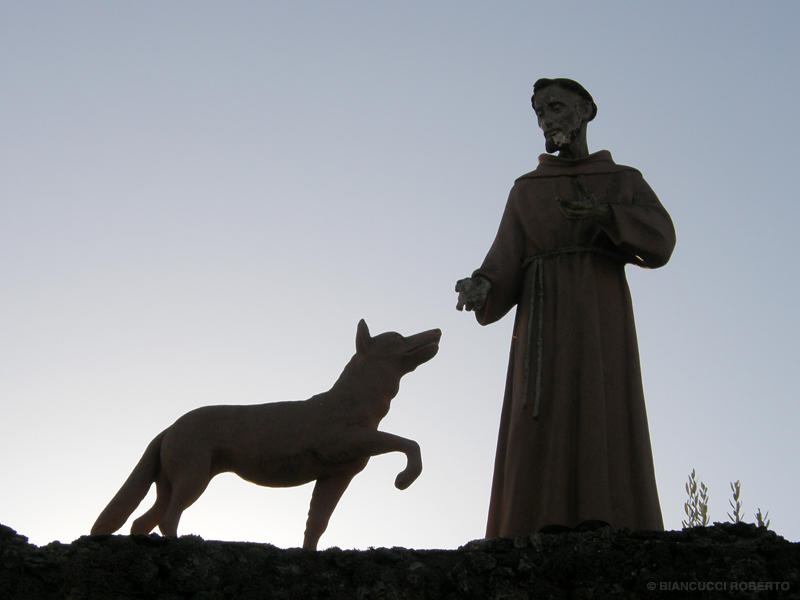
A statue of Francis with the wolf.

"Brother wolf, thou hast done much evil in this land, destroying and killing the creatures of God without his permission; yea, not animals only hast thou destroyed, but thou hast even dared to devour men, made after the image of God; for which thing thou art worthy of being hanged like a robber and a murderer. All men cry out against thee, the dogs pursue thee, and all the inhabitants of this city are thy enemies; but I will make peace between them and thee, O brother wolf, if so be thou no more offend them, and they shall forgive thee all thy past offences, and neither men nor dogs shall pursue thee any more."

The wolf bowed its head and submitted to Francis, completely at his mercy.

"As thou art willing to make this peace, I promise thee that thou shalt be fed every day by the inhabitants of this land so long as thou shalt live among them; thou shalt no longer suffer hunger, as it is hunger which has made thee do so much evil; but if I obtain all this for thee, thou must promise, on thy side, never again to attack any animal or any human being; dost thou make this promise?"

In agreement, the wolf placed one of his forepaws in Francis' outstretched hand, and the oath was made. Francis commanded the wolf to return with him to Gubbio. At this sight, the men who had followed him through the walls were utterly astonished and spread the news; soon the whole city knew of the miracle. The townsfolk gathered in the city marketplace to await Francis and his companion, and were shocked to see the ferocious wolf behaving as though his pet. When Francis reached the marketplace, he offered the assembled crowd an impromptu sermon with the tame wolf at his feet. He is quoted as saying: "How much we ought to dread the jaws of hell, if the jaws of so small an animal as a wolf can make a whole city tremble through fear?" With the sermon ended, Francis renewed his pact with the wolf publicly, assuring him that the people of Gubbio would feed him from their very doors if he ceased his predations. Once more the wolf placed his paw in Francis' hand.

== Aftermath ==
Thereafter, Gubbio venerated Francis and he received great praise from its citizens. Many of them were convinced by the miracle and offered their thanks to God, going on to be converted. This episode in the Fioretti is concluded with a note that the wolf lived for a further two years at Gubbio, going from home to home for sustenance and honoring the provisions of his agreement with Francis. At the wolf's death the city was saddened, for though he had slain so many, he was a symbol of the sanctity of Francis and the power of God.

According to tradition, Gubbio gave the wolf an honorable burial and later built the Church of Saint Francis of the Peace at the site. During renovations in 1872, the skeleton of a large wolf, apparently several centuries old, was found under a slab near the church wall and reburied inside. Legend holds that the church of the Vittorina was built on the spot where Francis met the wolf.

In 1913, the Nicaraguan poet Rubén Darío published Los motivos del lobo ("The wolf's reasons"), which subverts the tale's moral by showing the wolf renouncing Francis' pact and returning to its savage ways after experiencing abuse, starvation, and mockery at the hands of the people of Gubbio. When Francis is again asked by the town to intercede with the wolf, the creature despairs at the hypocrisy of humans and sends Francis away in tears, saying that it wishes simply to be left alone.

== See also ==
- Christian mysticism
- Christianization
- Order of Friars Minor
- Wolves in folklore, religion and mythology
