= 99 Ways to Tell a Story: Exercises in Style =

2005 graphic novel written by Matt Madden

- Date: 2005
- Publisher: Chamberlain Bros.

Creative team
- Creator: Matt Madden
- ISBN: 978-1-59609-078-1

99 Ways To Tell a Story: Exercises in Style is a 2005 experimental graphic novel by Matt Madden, published by the Penguin Group. Inspired by Raymond Queneau's 1947 book Exercises in Style, it tells the same simple story in 99 different ways.

The book is based on a simple one-page anecdote: a man (Madden himself) sits at his desk, gets up, walks to the refrigerator, tells someone (his wife, fellow cartoonist Jessica Abel) the time, and then realizes he's forgotten why he got up in the first place.

Madden then re-draws and re-tells the same set of events 99 times in different genres and drawing styles, in the form of homages and parodies, and in formal experiments that test the boundaries of the medium of comics. These ways include:

- Superhero
- Bayeux Tapestry (as a "newly discovered" fragment)
- Political cartoon
- How To with an explanation of the process of drawing a page like itself
- parodies (such EC Comics' horror titles)
- underground comix
- manga
- fantasy
- perspectives (from a voyeur looking in the window with binoculars)
- refrigerator, a fixed point in space in the downstairs room)
- a map
- a lifetime
- digitally — entirely in binary numbers
- nested stories
- advertisements
- Public Service Announcement
- Paranoid Religious Tract

== Reception ==
Print magazine's Steve Heller called the book "a fascinating analysis of and a treatise, of sorts, on language in comics," pointing out that the book proves that style itself creates meaning. Comics Worth Reading praises the book as a “clever, fascinating experiment" that highlights the expressive range of comics. By showcasing how style and structure shape meaning, the book "demonstrate[s] how varied approaches create very different kinds of art."

A positive review in The Guardian compared the book favorably to Queneau's version, writing, "Mercifully, Madden's comic-book homage manages to sidestep the creaking pretension of Oulipo, Queneau's 'potential literature workshop', and balances postmodern irony with genuine invention and amusement."

== Other editions ==
The book has been translated into numerous other languages, including French (L'Association), Spanish (Salamandra Graphic), Italian (Black Velvet), Flemish (Strip Turnhout), Japanese (Kokusho Kankokai), German, and Hungarian.
