= Zazie in the Metro =

Zazie in the Metro is the English translation of Zazie dans le Métro. It can refer to:

- Zazie dans le Métro (novel), a 1959 novel by Raymond Queneau
- Zazie dans le Métro (film), a 1960 film and adaptation of the novel
