= Exercises in Style =

1947 book by Raymond Queneau

- 1947 hardback edition
- Author: Raymond Queneau
- Original title: Exercices de style
- Translator: Barbara Wright (English)
- Illustrator: Mario Prassinos
- Language: French
- Genre: Constrained writing, Fiction
- Publisher: Gallimard
- Publication date: 1947
- Publication place: France
- English publication date: 1958
- Media type: Print

Exercises in Style (French: Exercices de style), written by Raymond Queneau, is a collection of 99 retellings of the same story, each in a different style. In each, the narrator gets on the "S" bus (now no. 84), witnesses an altercation between a man (a zazou) with a long neck and funny hat and another passenger, and then sees the same person two hours later at the Gare St-Lazare getting advice on adding a button to his overcoat. The literary variations recall the famous 33rd chapter of the 1512 rhetorical guide by Desiderius Erasmus, Copia: Foundations of the Abundant Style.

== Translations ==
The book has been translated into the following languages:

- English by Barbara Wright (1958); reprinted with 28 additional exercises (by Queneau) translated by Chris Clarke and 10 new exercises written in homage (New Directions, 2013)
- Serbian by Danilo Kiš (1964)
- German by Ludwig Harig and Eugen Helmlé (1974) and by Frank Heibert and Hinrich Schmidt-Henkel (2016)
- Dutch by Rudy Kousbroek (1978)
- Italian by Umberto Eco (1983)
- Greek by Achilleas Kyriakides (1984)
- Czech by Patrik Ouředník (1985)
- Esperanto by István Ertl (1986)
- Swedish by Lars Hagström (1987)
- Hungarian by Róbert Bognár (1988)
- Catalan by Annie Bats and Ramon Lladó (1989)
- Finnish by Pentti Salmenranta (1991)
- Danish by Otto Jul Pedersen (1994)
- Slovene by Aleš Berger (1994)
- Brazilian Portuguese by Luiz Resende (1995)
- Galician by Henrique Harguindey Banet and Xosé Manuel Pazos Varela (1995)
- Japanese by Asahina Koji (1996)
- Norwegian by Ragnar Hovland (1996)
- Spanish by Antonio Fernández Ferrer (1996)
- Russian by V. A. Petrov ed. (1998)
- European Portuguese by Helena Agarez Medeiros ed. (2000)
- Turkish by Armağan Ekici (2003)
- Zurich German by Felix E.Wyss (2004)
- Macedonian by Elizabeta Trpkovska (2005)
- Polish by Jan Gondowicz (2005)
- Basque by Xabier Olarra (2006)
- Romanian by Romulus Bucur ed. (2006)
- Ukrainian by Yaroslav Koval' and Yuriy Lisenko (the poems by Yurka Pozayaka) (2006)
- Bulgarian by Vasil Sotirov and Elena Tomalevska (2007)
- Estonian by Triinu Tamm and Jana Porila (2007)
- Croatian by Vladimir Gerić (2008)
- Traditional Chinese by Tan-Ying Chou (2016)
- Hebrew by Rotem Atar (2016)
- Lithuanian by Akvilė Melkūnaitė (2016)
- Korean by Jae-Ryong Cho (2020)
- Asturian by Pilar Fidalgo Pravia (2024)

Because, by their nature, the various retellings of the story employ fine subtleties of the French language, translations into these other languages are necessarily also adaptations.

== Styles employed ==
The English translation by Barbara Wright (reprinted in paperback in 1981) consists of the tale retold in the following 'styles'; where the original has been adapted (rather than translated), the original title is given in italics.

- Notation
- Double Entry
- Litotes
- Metaphorically
- Retrograde
- Surprises
- Dream
- Prognostication
- Synchysis
- The Rainbow
- Word Game
- Hesitation
- Precision
- The Subjective Side
- Another Subjectivity
- Narrative
- Word Composition
- Negativities
- Animism
- Anagrams
- Distinguo
- Homeoptotes
- Official Letter
- Blurb
- Onomatopoeia
- Logical Analysis
- Insistence
- Ignorance
- Past
- Present
- Reported Speech
- Passive
- Alexandrines
- Polyptotes
- Apheresis
- Apocope
- Syncope
- Speaking Personally
- Exclamations
- You Know
- Noble
- Cockney (Vulgaire)
- Cross examination
- Comedy
- Asides
- Parachesis
- Spectral
- Philosophic
- Apostrophe
- Awkward
- Casual
- Biased
- Sonnet
- Olfactory
- Gustatory
- Tactile
- Visual
- Auditory
- Telegraphic
- Ode
- Permutations by Groups
  of 2, 3, 4, and 5 letters
- Permutations by Groups
  of 5, 6, 7, and 8 letters
- Permutations by Groups
  of 9, 10, 11, and 12 letters
- Permutations by Groups
  of 1, 2, 3 and 4 words
- Hellenisms
- Reactionary
- Haiku
- Free Verse
- Feminine
- Gallicisms (Anglicismes)
- Prothesis
- Epenthesis
- Paragoge
- Parts of speech
- Metathesis
- Consequences
  (Par devant par derrière)
- Proper Names
- Rhyming Slang (Loucherbem)
- Back Slang (Javanais)
- Antiphrasis
- Dog Latin
- More or Less
- Opera English (Italianismes)
- For ze Frrensh (Poor lay Zanglay)
- Spoonerisms
- Botanical
- Medical
- Abusive
- Gastronomical
- Zoological
- Futile
- Modern Style
- Probabilist
- Portrait
- Mathematical
- West Indian (Paysan)
- Interjections
- Precious
- Unexpected

== Other adaptations ==
- Colin Crumplin's book Hommage A Queneau featuring drawings of a cup in 100 different styles was published in 1977 by Anthony Stokes.
- An homage in graphic novel form, 99 Ways to Tell a Story: Exercises in Style by Matt Madden, was published in 2005.
- A typographic interpretation of the German version of Exercices de Style, "Stilübungen – visuelle Interpretationen" by the graphic designer Marcus Kraft, was published in 2006.
- In Croatia (when it was part of SFR Yugoslavia), Tonko Maroević and Tomislav Radić adapted Exercices de Style (transferring the plot from the 1940s Paris to modern Zagreb) into a stage play for two actors, which has been played since 1968. Pero Kvrgić and Lela Margitić, who have been playing the only two roles since January 1970, hold a Guinness World Record for the Longest Theatrical Run with the Same Cast. They received a plaque in 2009.
- Inspired by Queneau's book, the first issue of uprightdown.com (2009) presented a single plot, which was retold in different forms and media by multiple participants.
- Following the formal example of Queneau, Paul Hoover of the United States published Sonnet 56 (2009), which consists of 56 stylistic versions of Shakespeare's sonnet 56, including "Villanelle," "Qasida," "Course Description," and "Ballad."
- Following the example of Queneau, Bethany M. Brownholtz published Exercises in Style: 21st Century Remix (2013), which consists of 40 additional versions, focusing on styles that have emerged over the last 60 years.
- The same story was told in more than hundred new styles in Russian by Tatiana Bonch-Osmolovskaya, Sergey Fedin, Sergey Orlov and others The styles includes combinatorial techniques, contemporary jargons and visuals poems.
- The British writer Ross Sutherland used techniques adapted from Exercises in Style in the audio story Me Versus the Spar (Parts 1 to 7) on the Imaginary Advice podcast in 2018.
- Turkish writer Ferit Edgü wrote a book titled "Yazmak Eylemi (The Act of Writing)" inspired by Queneau's book in 1980. Edgü tried to do similar style variations in Turkish language by playing with a news article about anarchists forcing local shop owners to close their shops for a whole day to demonstrate their power on the community.
- The mathematician Philip Ording published his 99 Variations on a Proof (2019) of a cubic equation that offers solutions from various perspectives.
- The computer scientist Cristina Videira Lopes (https://dl.acm.org/profile/81500647693) wrote a book titled "Exercises in Programming Style" Released November 2015, Publisher(s): Chapman and Hall/CRC, ISBN 9781498766739 From her department at UC Irvine: "In order to give programming styles the proper due, and inspired by Queneau, Lopes decided to embark on the project of writing the exact same computational task in as many styles as she has come across over the years. This project involves two artifacts: a collection of code examples currently hosted in github (https://github.com/crista/exercises-in-programming-style), and a textbook that explains 32 of those code examples line by line."
