= Citroën U55 Currus Cityrama =

U55 Currus Cityrama
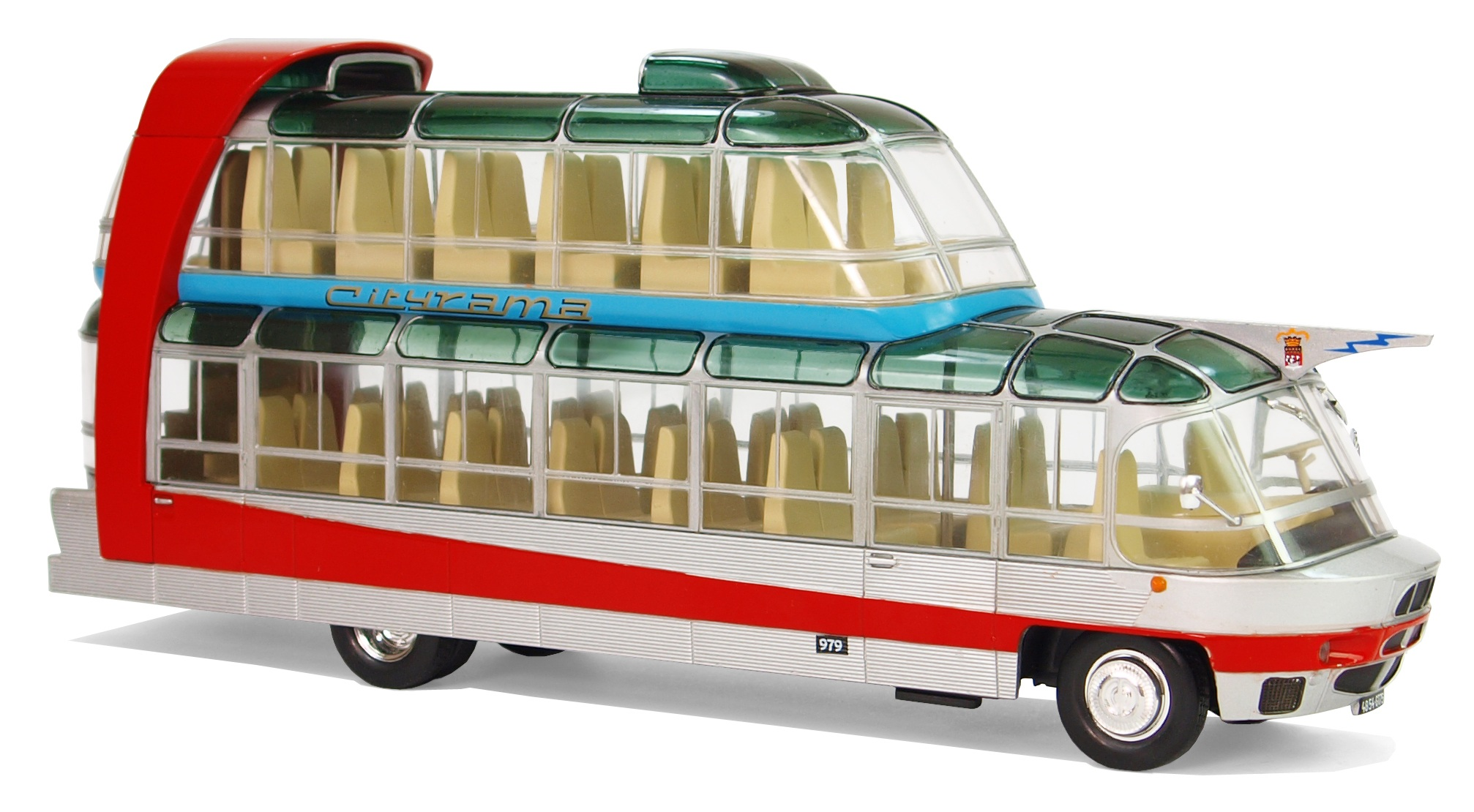
- Citroën U55 Currus Cityrama (scale model)

Overview
- Manufacturer: Citroën / Currus
- Production: 1956–1959
- Designer: Albert Lemaitre

Body and chassis
- Class: Bus

Dimensions
- Height: 4,350 mm (171 in)

Chronology
- Successor: Saviem-Chausson SC-1 Currus Cityrama

The Citroën U55 Currus Cityrama was a French sightseeing bus.

== History ==
=== Background ===
The newly founded Paris city tour operator Cityrama commissioned the coachbuilding company Currus in 1956 to build sightseeing buses that had to meet three requirements: They were to be constructed as double-deckers (Bus à impériale), their bodies were to be made of glass as much as possible to ensure a good all-round view for the passengers, and above all, their design was not to resemble any other sightseeing bus.

=== Origin ===
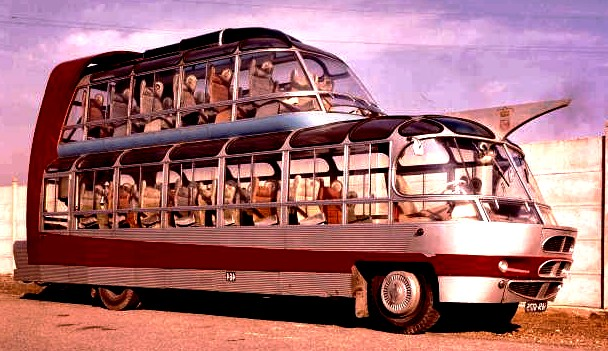
Citroën U55 Currus Cityrama

Based on these requirements, the technical director of Currus, Albert Lemaître, designed a bus based on the Citroën chassis of the Type 55, which had no prototype. The lower part of the light metal body was inspired by the hulls of the Mouches excursion boats that travelled on the Seine and ended in two tail fins, curved Plexiglas structures enclosed the two passenger decks, a wide red decorative stripe that ran the entire length of the vehicle merged at the rear into a kind of tail tail that spanned as a large arch over both bus decks, and a kind of ram protruded pointedly forwards from the edge of the roof of the lower deck at the front. Apart from its spectacular shape, the bus also featured technical innovations; for example, each seat had a pair of headphones, which allowed passengers to listen to the commentary during the journey in one of eight languages at the touch of a button.

The uniquely designed, eye-catching bus proved to be a great success, so much so that Cityrama ordered more units. However, the weaknesses of the design also became apparent during operation: when exposed to sunlight, the non-air-conditioned glass structure acted like a hothouse and heated up considerably; the fact that the roof of the upper deck could be opened almost completely did little to alleviate the problem. In addition, the buses' engines tended to overheat due to the heavy weight of the structure. The single radiator grille of the original design was not sufficient for cooling the drive, so additional radiators were added during conversions until the buses finally had three front radiator grilles arranged one above the other and another separate side oil cooler. Despite these measures, one of the buses caught fire on the Rue de Rivoli and burned out, but no one was injured.

=== Problems ===
The technical problems led Cityrama not to order any more vehicles of this type after the delivery of the last bus in 1959. Instead, a completely newly designed successor double-decker based on the Saviem-Chausson SC1 was ordered from Currus, whose conventional structure was far less spectacular and eccentric despite adopting some design elements.

=== Whereabouts ===
The existing Citroën Currus buses remained in use at Cityrama for decades, were an integral part of the street scene in Paris and often appeared in films with their outstanding appearance, such as in Zazie dans le Métro. The last Currus bus was decommissioned in 1980. One was subsequently used by the French circus Sabine Rancy, but its trace has been lost. The only surviving bus of this type, delivered in 1959, had been stored for over 30 years and is now owned by the Association Normande d’Anciens Utilitaires, which has begun its restoration.
