= Matt Madden =

U.S. comic book writer and artist

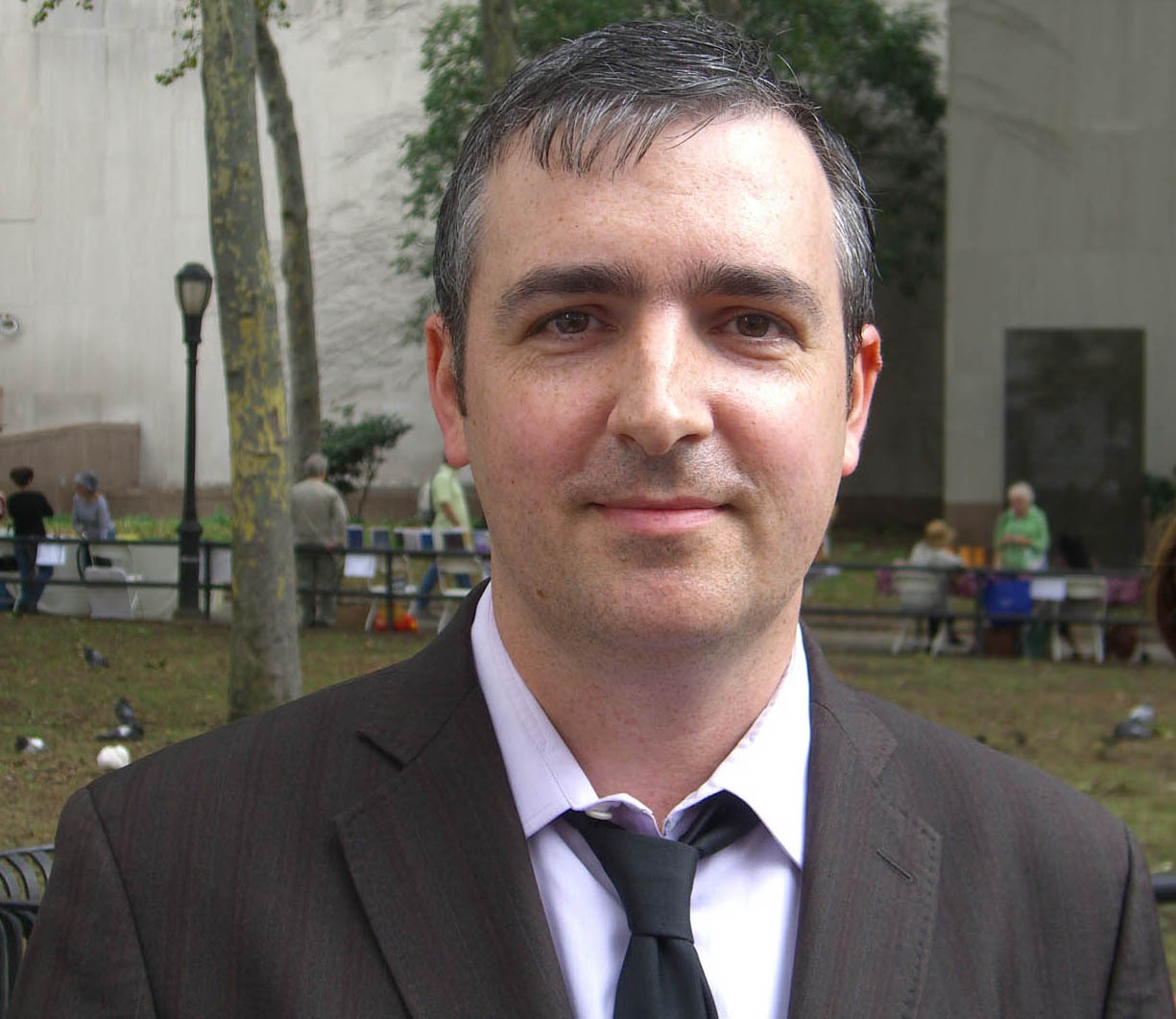
- Madden at the 2009 Brooklyn Book Festival
- Born: May 8, 1968 (age 58) New York City, U.S.
- Areas: Cartoonist, Writer, Colourist
- Notable works: 99 Ways to Tell a Story: Exercises in Style
- Awards: Chevalier dans l’Ordre des Arts et des Lettres (2013)
- Spouse: Jessica Abel

Matt Madden (born May 8, 1968, in New York City) is an American comic book writer, artist, and educator. He is best known for the experimental work 99 Ways to Tell a Story: Exercises in Style. In addition to his work in the realm of alternative comics, Madden is known for his coloring work in traditional comics. He has also taught comics at the School of Visual Arts and Yale University.

== Early life and education ==
Madden was born in New York City. He grew up primarily in Greenwich, Connecticut, though his family also spent about five years living in Paris, which gave him a deep connection to French language and culture.

Madden first attended Hamilton College, transferring to the University of Michigan after his sophomore year; he graduated from Michigan in 1990 with a B.A. in Comparative Literature (English and German). He later earned a Master of Foreign Language Education degree from the University of Texas at Austin.

== Career ==
=== Alternative comics ===
Madden began his career self-publishing minicomics in Ann Arbor, Michigan, in the early 1990s. He was co-editor with Matt Feazell and Sean Bieri of the anthology 5 O'Clock Shadow. After several of his short pieces appeared in established publications, Madden's first graphic novel, Black Candy, was published by Black Eye Books in 1998. His graphic novel Odds Off was published by Highwater Books (2001), and two issues of his periodical series of short works, A Fine Mess, were published by Alternative Comics (2002–2004).

Madden's work from the early 2000s often dealt with themes in settings in Mexico (where he lived for a time in the late 1990s), or that were rooted in Mexican culture. For a time, he was a consulting editor for the minicomic Le Sketch, published out of Portugal.

During this period, Madden also worked as an editorial illustrator.

=== Comics formalism ===
In 2002, Madden was named the "U.S. correspondent" of OuBaPo, a French comics movement which believes in the use of formal constraints to push the boundaries of the medium.

Madden's 99 Ways to Tell a Story: Exercises in Style, published in 2005, is an inventive comics homage to Raymond Queneau's 1947 book Exercises in Style. 99 Ways to Tell a Story retells a single, mundane one-page anecdote in 99 radically different visual and narrative variations. Both playful and analytical, the book serves as a living demonstration of the formal possibilities of comics — exploring how changes in style, structure, and design transform meaning while foregrounding the very language of the medium.

Madden's Ex Libris, published in 2021, is a playful, metafictional locked-room mystery in which a nameless narrator searches an endless, imaginary library for clues to his predicament. Mixing genres and visual styles — from superhero parody to indie romance to EC Comics horror — the book is both a puzzle and a celebration of comics themselves.

Other works expressing Madden's interests as a comics theorist/formalist include Bridge (2013/2016/2021) and Drawn Onward (2015).

Six Treasures of the Spiral: Comics Formed Under Pressure, a collection of Madden's experiments in comics formalism, was released in 2024 by Uncivilized Books. Stories take the form of a visual palindrome, align their structures with the letters of the alphabet, or adhere to strict poetic formats such as the villanelle and haiku.

=== Mainstream comics colorist ===
From 2001 to 2006, Madden worked as a comics colorist for DC and Marvel Comics, coloring such titles and series as Bizarro Comics, Bizarro World, Captain America: Dead Men Running, Soldier X, and The Thing: Night Falls on Yancy Street.

=== Criticism/education/translation ===
In the mid-1990s, Madden began writing reviews for The Comics Journal and other publications. In the early 2000s, he taught comics storytelling at the School of Visual Arts.

With his wife, fellow cartoonist Jessica Abel, Madden published two comics textbooks — Drawing Words and Writing Pictures, (First Second Books, 2008), and Mastering Comics: Drawing Words & Writing Pictures Continued (First Second, 2012).

Madden has translated a number of French bande dessinées for the English-language market, including works by Aristophane, Edmond Baudoin, and Blutch.

== Personal life ==
Madden currently lives in Philadelphia, Pennsylvania, with his wife, fellow comics creator Jessica Abel, and their two children. They took a sabbatical in France in August 2012.

== Awards ==
In 1998, Madden was nominated for an Ignatz Award for Promising New Talent (for Black Candy).

In 2013, Madden was named a Chevalier dans l’Ordre des Arts et des Lettres ("Knight in the Order of Arts and Letters") in a ceremony held at the Cultural Services of the French Embassy in New York.

== Bibliography ==
=== Comics and graphic novels ===
- Black Candy (Black Eye Books, 1998) ISBN 978-0-9698874-6-1
- Odds off, or, L'amour foutu (Highwater Books, 2001) ISBN 978-0-9665363-9-3
- A Fine Mess, 2 issues (Alternative Comics, 2002–2004)
- 99 Ways to Tell a Story: Exercises in Style (Chamberlain Bros., 2005) ISBN 978-1-59609-078-1
- Bridge (Kuš!, 2013/2016/2021)
- Drawn Onward (Retrofit Comics, 2015) — originally created for One Story
- Ex Libris: A Comic (Uncivilized Books, 2021) ISBN 978-1-941250-44-0
- Six Treasures of the Spiral: Comics Formed Under Pressure (Uncivilized Books, 2024) ISBN 978-1941250655

=== Textbooks ===
- Madden, with Jessica Abel, Drawing Words and Writing Pictures, (First Second, 2008) ISBN 978-1-59643-131-7
- Madden, with Jessica Abel, Mastering Comics: Drawing Words & Writing Pictures Continued, (First Second, 2012) ISBN 978-1596436176

=== As translator ===
- Aristophane, The Zabime Sisters (First Second, 2010) ISBN 1596436387
- Edmond Baudoin, Piero (New York Review Comics, 2018)
- Blutch, Mitchum (New York Review Comics, 2020)

== See also ==
- Scott McCloud
