= 99 Variations on a Proof =

2019 book by Philip Ording

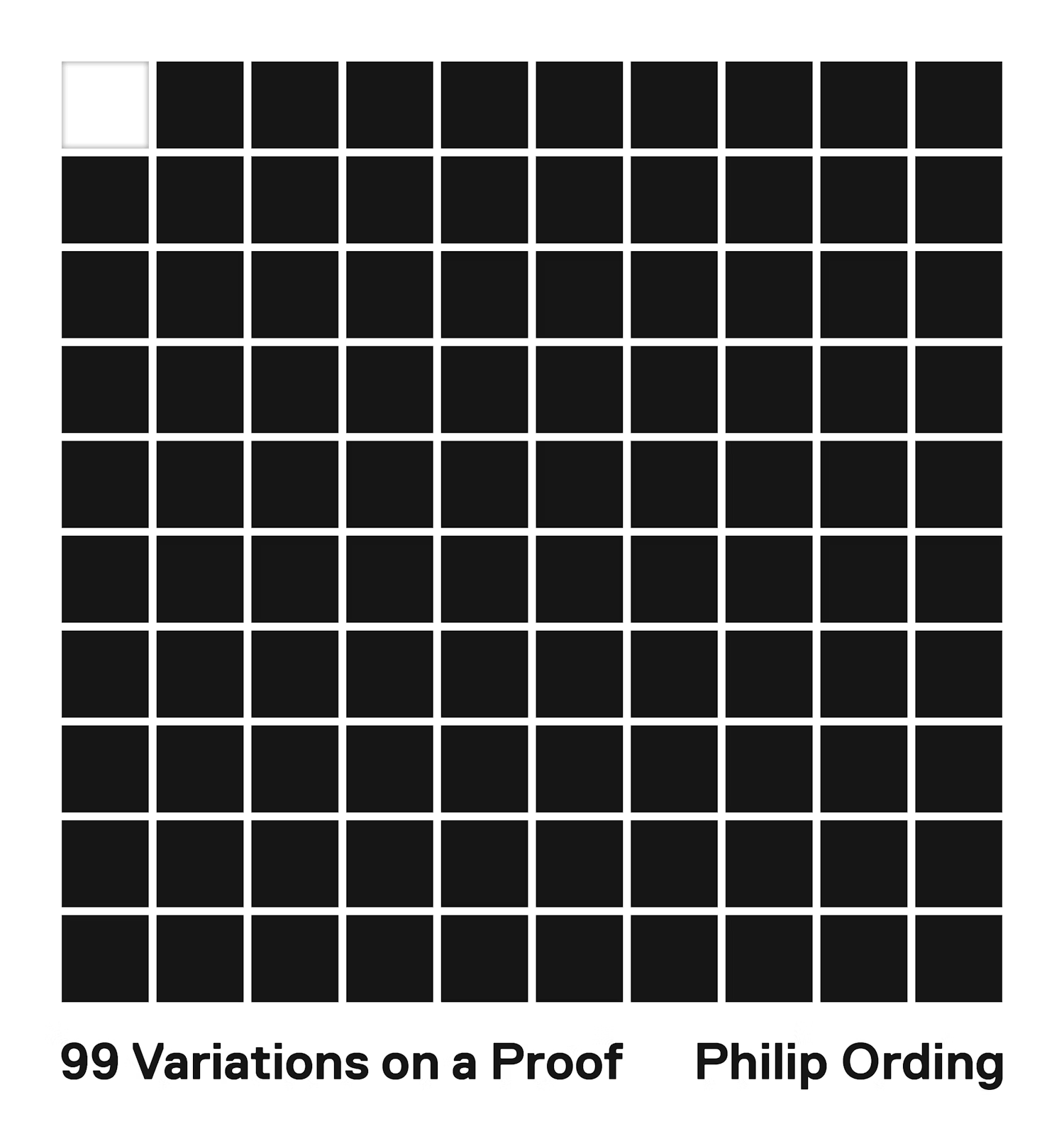
- Author: Philip Ording
- Subject: Mathematical proofs
- Publisher: Princeton University Press
- Publication date: January 22, 2019
- ISBN: 9780691218977
- Website: https://press.princeton.edu/books/paperback/9780691218977/99-variations-on-a-proof

99 Variations on a Proof is a mathematics book by Philip Ording, in which he proves the same result in 99 different ways. Ording takes an example of a cubic equation,
$$x^3 - 6x^2 + 11x - 6 = 2x - 2,$$
and shows that its solutions are $x = 1$ and $x = 4$ using a different method in each chapter. The structure of the book was inspired by Oulipo co-founder Raymond Queneau's Exercises de style (1947). The book was published in 2019 by Princeton University Press.

== Reception ==
Writing in The Mathematical Intelligencer, John J. Watkins described the book as "marvelous" and said that "Ording's inventiveness seems boundless". Watkins praised several of the proofs, particularly the visual proof in Chapter 10, while noting that some of the others left him "cold" by appealing to topics outside his own interests or exhausting his patience. While Watkins found the origami-based proof in Chapter 39 perplexing, Dan Rockmore's review in the New York Review of Books called the same proof "a delight". Reviewing the book for the Mathematical Association of America, Geoffrey Dietz also gave a positive evaluation, saying that he "learned something new" from several proofs and found some of them quite comedic.
