= The Blue Flowers =

1965 novel by Raymond Queneau

- First edition
- Author: Raymond Queneau
- Original title: Les fleurs bleues
- Translator: Barbara Wright
- Language: French
- Genre: Novel
- Publication date: 1965
- Publication place: France
- Media type: Print (Hardback & Paperback)
- ISBN: 0-8112-0945-8

The Blue Flowers, also known as Between Blue and Blue (original French title: Les fleurs bleues), is a French novel written by Raymond Queneau in 1965.

The English translation is by Barbara Wright, who also translated Queneau's Zazie in the Metro. The Italian translation was by Italo Calvino.

== Premise ==
Joaquin, Duke of Auge, dreams that he is Cidrolin, living alone on a barge in Paris, while Cidrolin dreams that he is the Duke of Auge, travelling through the history of France. Starting in 1264, he travels through time alongside two talking horses, skipping 175 years each time. They will meet in 1964.
