= La Perdida =

Alternative comic book series by Jessica Abel (2001–2005)

Publication information
- Publisher: Fantagraphics
- Schedule: Annually
- Publication date: Aug. 2001 – Feb. 2005
- No. of issues: 5
- Main character: Carla Olivares

Creative team
- Created by: Jessica Abel
- Written by: Jessica Abel
- Artist: Jessica Abel

Collected editions
- La Perdida: ISBN 978-0375423659

La Perdida is an alternative comic book series created by Jessica Abel and published by Fantagraphics. It was collected into graphic novel form by Pantheon Books, and has received a positive critical response.

== Publication history ==
La Perdida #1 debuted in August 2001 and new issues came out every year until 2005. Abel revised the text for its compilation and publication in 2006 as a 288-page hardcover volume by Pantheon.

== Plot ==
During her stay in Mexico City as an American expatriate attempting to gain a greater knowledge of her Mexican heritage, Carla encounters a variety of people, eventually rejecting her role within the expatriate social hierarchy and attempting to achieve a more authentic experience of life as an "ordinary" citizen of Mexico. Her encounters prove time and time again, however, that the dismissal of her background is not easily achieved and she eventually reconciles with the universality of human nature (in controversion to her initial notions of authenticity). Along the way, she confronts the complexities of an age-old civilization, upheavals of conflicting politics, and the criminal undercurrents of Mexico City.

== See also ==
- List of feminist comic books
- Portrayal of women in comics
