= Miroglyph =

Pictorial signs of artist Joan Miró

Miroglyph is a neologism coined by French author Raymond Queneau in his 1949 essay entitled Joan Miró ou le poète préhistorique, to describe the pictorial signs of artist Joan Miró, comparing them to letters of an alphabet.

== Historical context ==
=== Joan Miró and poetry ===
The love of the Catalan artist Joan Miró for poetry blossoms in the 1910s, in Barcelona, thanks to Francesc Galf, one of his first teachers, and to the international environment of Josep Dalmau's gallery. In this period Miró begins to read avant-garde magazines assiduously, such as Revista Nova, Sic, and 391, founded by artists Picabia and Man Ray, through which he follows the news of modern French art. But above all he is fond of North-South, the periodical of Pierre Reverdy, a French poet of great fame, who was an intimate friend of Picasso and of the main protagonists of the historical avant-gardes. For the young Miró, who is 24 years old at the time, Reverdy is a revelation: evenatully, the artist dedicates a painting to him and to his magazine, entitled North-South (1917).

Things change radically in the 1920s, when Miró discovers Paris. In Paris, he visits the Louvre, meets Picasso, joins the circle of surrealists and meets the merchants who, a few years later, would make his fortune. But the real thrill, for Miró, consists in knowing personally the authors of the verses that had nourished his imagination in his youth and who would have continued to do so throughout his life: Pierre Reverdy and Tristan Tzara, Paul Eluard and Jacqeus Prévert, André Breton and Guillaume Apollinaire, Louis Aragon and Antonin Artaud, Ernest Hemingway, René Char, and Raymond Queneau. Later, Miró confesses that, at that time, he was much more interested in poets than painters, fascinated by their way of looking at the world and their endless nocturnal discussions.

=== Friendship with Raymond Queneau ===
That with Raymond Queneau is a very intense friendship that lasts from 1948 to 1975: until his death in 1983, Miró entertains a fruitful exchange of correspondence with Queneau and other intellectual friends. The symbiosis between the French poet and the Spanish artist is perfect: when passing by Paris, Miró never forgets to visit his friend. After a day's work they meet up with their wives Pilar Juncosa and Janine Khan in a Catalan restaurant near the Folies Bergère, or they have a family dinner in Neuilly by the Queneaus. In 1951, Joan Miró is also entrusted with the task of illustrating a book of poems written by Queneau's wife, Janine.

The artistic collaboration between the two is vast, and like Tzara, Breton, Eluard and many other poets, Queneau composes verses to celebrate his artist friend, such as the short poem POUR (1948), in which he invents the pun adMIROns.

POUR
Ses pinceaux de plume,
ses tubes de crayon,
ses couleurs d'Angers,
ses toiles émérites,
ses encres de cygne,
nous l'adMIROns.

— Raymond Queneau (1948), "POUR". Derrière Le Miroir n. 14–15 (November–December)
Translation:

FOR
His feather brushes,
his pencil tubes,
his colors of Angers,
his distinguished paintings,
his swan inks,
we adMIRe him.

But it is in critical essays that Queneau shows his greatest commitment, speaking of Miró's painting with a living and dreamy language. In this regard, it must be mentioned the texts written for the second volume of the catalogue raisonné of Miró's lithographs (Joan Miró Litographs II, 1953–1963), published by Maeght in 1975, and the essay for Album 19 (1961), a coherent and homogeneous series of large-format lithographs, populated by vaguely figurative images, spots of pure color and visionary signs. Raymond Queneau's introductory text is handwritten, and his words are superimposed with drops of color and signs traced by Miró himself as lithography. In 1949 Queneau published the essay Joan Miró ou le poète préhistorique (Joan Miró or the prehistoric poet), an introduction to the monograph published by editor Albert Skira in the famous series Les trésors de la peinture, which deals with the hermeticism of Miró's art: in the text, the poet observes that in the production of Joan Miró recurs constant configurations and traits, which he defines miroglyphs. Similarly to hieroglyphs, miroglyphs, as characters of an ideographic script, can be associated with objects or ideas, translatable through an alphabet or a dictionary of convention to refer to. Queneau states that

Miró's painting is a writing that you must be able to decipher. A poem must be read in its original language; you have to learn the "miró", the "miroglyph", and once you know it (or think you know it), you can start reading his poems.

— Raymond Queneau (1949), Joan Miró ou le poète préhistorique. Geneva: Albert Skira

Queneau thus argues that it can be compiled the Dictionnaire des signes Miresques (Dictionary of Miró signs): however, the poet never realizes this project.

== Dictionnaire des signes Miresques ==
Many scholars have eventually elaborated a sort of dictionary of Miró language: the most relevant works have been published by Marc Rolnik (1966), Sidra Stich (1980), Domènec Corbella (1993), and Tiziana Migliore (2011).

=== Marc Rolnik (1966) ===
Art historian Marc Rolnik publishes the book Estrellas y Constelaciones: un glosario in 1966. Rolnik's project aims to offer all dictionary definitions of the term "star" in Spanish, French and English, and to propose a combination of such terms and:

- a list of titles of Miró's paintings in which astral words appear, as the artist has dedicated a series of 23 paintings on paper produced from January 1940 to September 1941 to the theme of constellations;
- a collection of passages by writers and poets who, referring to Miró, use an astral terminology;
- a list of symbols of the artist's language, divided into "symbols of the universe", "symbols of the creation", "symbols of passage", and "symbols of revelation".

=== Sidra Stich (1980) ===
American art historian Sidra Stich conducts a more detailed research than Rolnik's. In 1980, Stich publishes Joan Miró: The Development of a Sign Language, in which she focuses on the relationship between myroglyphs and pictograms of the Paleolithic age. Italian archaeologist Emmanuel Anati too finds that there are similarities between the signs of Miró and the pictograms of primitive art. Stich, contrary to Rolnik, does not provide a list of recurring symbols in Miró's paintings, but describes some works that she considers exemplifying the relationship with prehistoric art, such as The Hunter (Catalan Landscape) (1924). What unites the signs of Miró and prehistoric art, for Stich, is the tendency to stylization and the constant ability to recognize figures.

=== Domènec Corbella (1993) ===
The most detailed study on the language of the Catalan artist is Entendre Miró: Anàlisi del llenguatge mironià a partir de la sèrie Barcelona 1939–1944, published by Domènec Corbella in 1993. The art historian focuses on a representative corpus limited to the Barcelona Series, a group of 50 black and white lithographs realized between 1939 and 1944, which are the reaction to the Spanish Civil War, as they express a denunciation of the Franco regime and a tribute to the forces that support Barcelona against the occupation of Francisco Franco.

Starting from the small and homogeneous group, Corbella proceeds to collect constant grammatical elements and units, dividing them into:

- "cosmic configurations", that include spots, binary compositions, zigzags, stairs, spirals, suns, moons, and stars;
- "organic configurations", which include feet, buttocks, arms, anuses, phalluses, breasts, faces, eyes, profiles, teeth, large heads, thread-like characters, outlined characters, knots, birds, and snakes.

=== Tiziana Migliore (2011) ===
The latest attempt to draft a dictionary of the Miró language was conducted by Italian art historian Tiziana Migliore in 2011, entitled Miroglifici: Figura e Scrittura in Joan Miró. Migliore analyzes the artist's sketches, paintings and preparatory drawings, from which she reconstructs a real visual idiom, equipped with a grammar, syntax rules, a dictionary of figures, and even a pronunciation, identified thanks to the principles of semiotics. In addition, the Italian scholar analyzes the evolution of miroglyphs over time, noting how some of them disappear or are completely revised, as in the case of the dancer motif.

== From painting to language ==
Well before Raymond Queneau's intuition about the constant appearance of miroglyphs in the Catalan artists' paintings, Joan Miró himself presented the semiological nature of his works, implying that the signs impressed on his canvases always referred to concrete forms, as elements of a verbal language. In 1968, Miró provided a list containing an inventory of his pictorial signs with their definition, in one of the preparatory sketches of the choreographic, poetic and musical ballet L’OEil-Oiseau. The ballet, conceived and designed by French poet Jacques Dupin in 1968, was meant to show the artist's creative processes in a narrative form; the figures themselves, painted on panels of different sizes and interpreted by anonymous characters in the parade, were supposed to take on acting roles. In these drawings, Miró displayed his 'parade of obsessions', including symbols like the testicles, the woman, the numbers 3, 13 and 9, the colour blue, the star, the shooting star, the female sex, the three hairs, the escape ladder, the moon, the sun, the circle, the eye, the bird, infinity, and the enigma. The show was supposed to take place at the Fondation Maeght in Paris, but never went on stage.

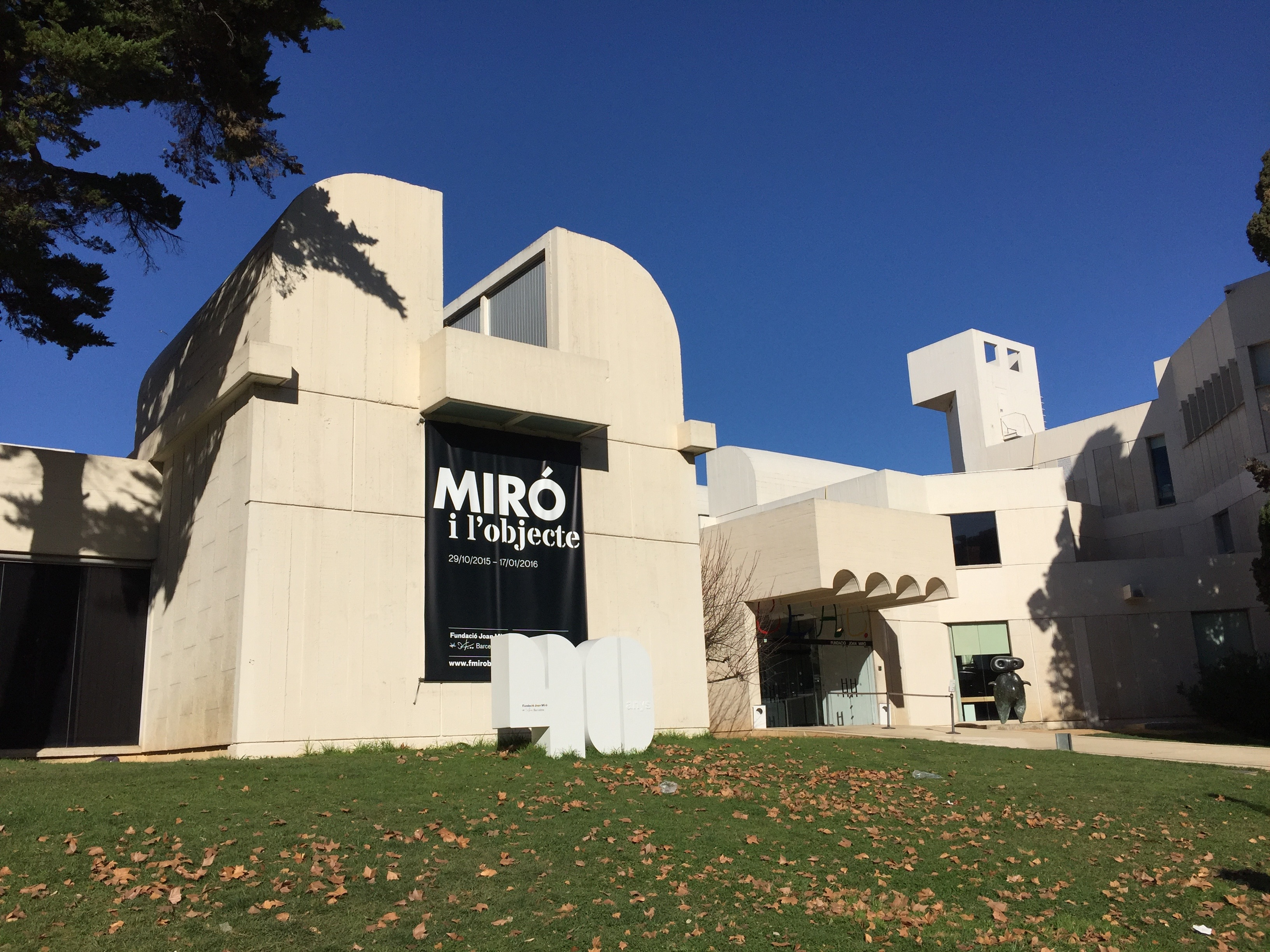
Fundació Joan Miró, Montjuïc (Barcelona). Founded by Joan Miró in 1975, designed by Josep Lluís Sert.

Even later, in 1975, Miró delivered a significant repertoire of drawings to the Fundació of Barcelona, that he had just set up: almost five thousand sketches, fragmentary sheets, in-depth studies, and preparatory drawings of works in which the presence of an enunciative writing was evident.

Joan Miró declared:

For me a tree is not a tree, it is not a thing that belongs to the vegetable category, but it is a human thing, a living being. A tree is a character, especially the trees in my area, the carob trees. A character who speaks, who has leaves. Even disturbing. You know that sometimes I put an eye or an ear on trees. It is the tree that sees and hears.

— Joan Miró (1978), in George Raillard, Conversaciones con Miró. Barcelona: Granica, pp. 60–61

== See also ==
- International Association for Visual Semiotics

== Bibliography ==
- Takiguchi, Shuzo (1940). Miró. Tokyo: Atelier.
- Sweeney, James Johnson (1941). Joan Miró. New York: Museum of Modern Art.
- Miró, Joan; Tzara, Tristan; Cassou, Jean; Queneau, Raymond; Eluard, Paul; Hemingway, Ernest (1948). Derrière Le Miroir N°s 14–15 (in French). Paris: Maeght.
- Cirici, Alexandre (1949). Miró y la imaginación (in Spanish). Barcelona: Omega.
- Cirlot, Juan Eduardo (1949). Joan Miró (in Spanish). Barcelona: Cobalto.
- Queneau, Raymond (1949). Mirò ou le poète préhistorique (in French). Geneva: Albert Skira.
- Dupin, Jacques (1961). Miró (in French). Paris: Flammarion (published 2004). ISBN 9782080113023.
- Rolnik, Marc (1966). Estrellas y Constelaciones: un glosario (in Spanish). Barcelona: Fundació Joan Miró.
- Cirici, Alexandre (1977). Miró-Mirall (in Spanish). Barcelona: Poligrafa. ISBN 9788434302563.
- Dupuis, Jules-François (1978). A Cavalier History of Surrealism. Chico: A K Pr Distribution (published 2000). ISBN 9781873176948.
- Raillard, George (1978). Conversaciones con Miró (in Spanish). Barcelona: Granica. ISBN 9788474320367.
- Stich, Sidra (1980). Joan Miró: The Development of a Sign Language. St. Louis: University Gallery of Art. ISBN 9780936316000.
- Barthes, Roland (1984). L'empire des signes (in French). Paris: Seuil (published 2015). ISBN 9782021229554.
- Bandini, Mirella (1986). La vertigine del moderno. Percorsi surrealisti (in Italian). Rome: Officina. ISBN 9788860493347.
- Goody, Jack (1989). Il suono e i segni (in Italian). Milan: Il Saggiatore. ISBN 9788804310914.
- Combalia, Victoria (1990). El descubrimiento de Miró: Miró y sus críticos, 1918-1929 (in Spanish). Barcelona: Destino.
- Corbella, Domènec (1993). Entendre Miró: Anàlisi del llenguatge mironià a partir de la sèrie Barcelona 1939–1944 (in Spanish). Barcelona: Publicacions Universitat de Barcelona. ISBN 9788447504527.
- Tone, Lilian (Autumn 1993). "The Journey of Miró's Constellations". MoMa. 15 (15): 1–6. JSTOR 4381235. Archived from the original on 10 June 2022.
- Dupin, Jacques; Lelong-Mainaud, Ariane (1999). Joan Miró. Catalogue raisonné (in French). Paris: Éditions Lelong.
- Serra, Catalina (14 June 2001). "El mundo de símbolos y obsesiones de Joan Miró se desvela en una exposición". El Paìs. Archived from the original on 14 June 2022.
- Anati, Emmanuel (2002). La struttura elementare dell'arte (in Italian). Capo di Ponte: Edizioni del Centro Camuno di Studi Preistorici. ISBN 9788886621182.
- Caws, Mary Ann (2002). Surrealist Painters and Poets: An Anthology. Cambridge: The MIT Press. ISBN 9780262532013.
- Migliore, Tiziana (2006). Miroglifici. Un modello di lingua nelle logiche dell'arte (in Italian). Urbino: University of Urbino. OCLC 956080514.
- Balsach, Maria Josep (2007). Joan Miró: Cosmogonies D'un Mon (in French). Barcelona: Galaxia Gutenberg. ISBN 9788481096835.
- Binni, Lanfranco (2007). Il surrealismo (in Italian). Rome: Newton Compton. ISBN 9788882897178.
- Clair, Jean; Debray, Regis (2007). Processo al Surrealismo (in Italian). Rome: Fazi. ISBN 9788881128433.
- Tavola, Michele; Gatti, Chiara (2009). Mirò Illustratore (in Italian). Pisa: ETS. ISBN 9788846723390.
- Migliore, Tiziana (2011). Miroglifici. Figura e scrittura in Joan Mirò (in Italian). Milan: et al. ISBN 9788864630427.
- Schiaffini, Ilaria (2011). Arte contemporanea: metafisica, dada, surrealismo (in Italian). Rome: Carocci. ISBN 9788843057870.
- Ottinger, Didier (2013). Dictionnaire de l'objet surréaliste (in French). Paris: Gallimard. ISBN 9782070141814.
- De Micheli, Mario (2014). Le avanguardie artistiche del Novecento (in Italian). Milan: Feltrinelli. ISBN 9788807884092.
- Matevosyan, Armine; Hovakimian, Nazeny (2014). "The Semiotic Interpretation of Joan Miró's World of Signs" (PDF). Armenian Folia Anglistika. 10 (12): 112–120. doi:10.46991/AFA/2014.10.1-2.112. Archived from the original (PDF) on 7 June 2022.
- Chen, Hsin-yen; Su, I-wen (2016). "Paintings as "Visual Poetry": Diagrammatic Iconicity in the Art of Juan Miró". Public Journal of Semiotics. 7 (2): 1–20. doi:10.37693/pjos.2016.7.16270. Archived from the original (PDF) on 7 June 2022.
- Orozco, Miguel (2016). La odisea de Miró y sus Constelaciones (in Spanish). Madrid: Visor. ISBN 9788498956757.
- Bohn, Willard (2017). Surrealist Poetry: An Anthology. New York: Bloomsbury Academic. ISBN 9781441153142.
- Vanzetto, Chiara (7 March 2017). "Joan Miró e le parole. Un rapporto inedito e multicolor". Corriere della Sera. Archived from the original on 10 June 2022.
- Lebel, Robert (2018). Il surrealismo come tergicristallo (in Italian). Monza: Johan & Levi. ISBN 9788860102034.
- Baratta, Ilaria (7 July 2019). "Miroglifici: il fantastico mondo di Joan Miró come una lingua da imparare a leggere". Finestre sull'Arte. Archived from the original on 14 June 2022.
