= Saint Glinglin (book) =

1948 novel by Raymond Queneau

- 1st English edition
- Author: Raymond Queneau
- Translator: James Sallis
- Language: French
- Genre: Fiction
- Published: 1948 Gallimard
- Publication place: France
- English publication date: 1993 Dalkey Archive Press
- Pages: 169

Saint Glinglin (French: Saint-Glinglin) is a 1948 novel by Raymond Queneau. The book is firmly situated in the postmodernist tradition, like much of Queneau's oeuvre. The title refers the Provencal Saint Glinglin, but the narrative is that of various stylings on the overarching theme of Oedipus. The story involves Pierre of Home Town, who is sent out to Foreign Town, where it does nothing but rain for one year, and the entire year at that. The book borrows from Queneau's involvement in the concept of 'Pataphysics.
