= Jean-Marie Queneau =

French painter (1934–2022)

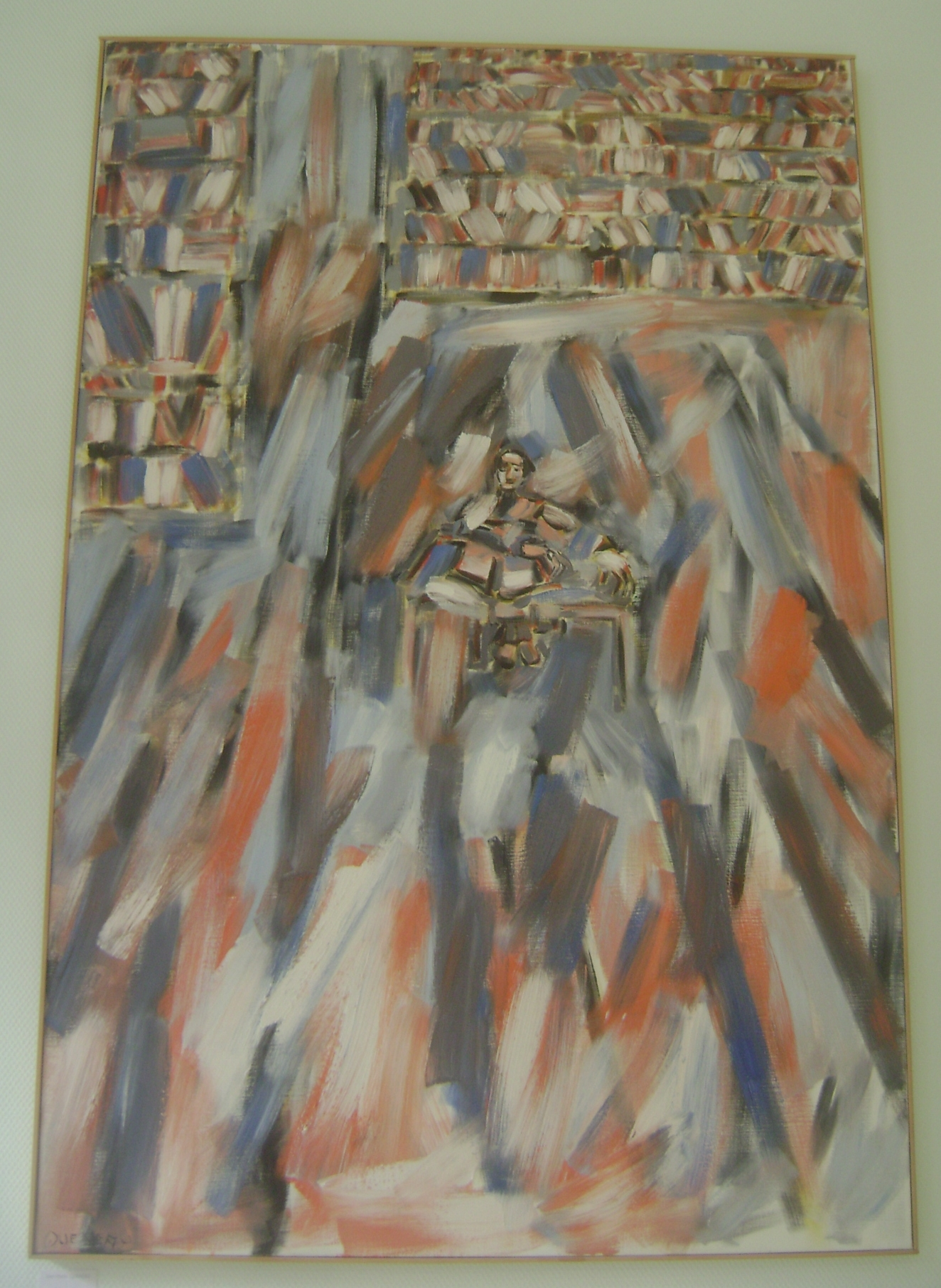
- Bibliothèque by Queneau
- Born: 21 March 1934; Paris, France
- Died: 16 February 2022 (aged 87); France
- Occupation: Painter

Jean-Marie Queneau (21 March 1934 – 16 February 2022) was a French painter, engraver, and editor.

== Biography ==
Jean-Marie was the son of the writer Raymond Queneau and his wife, Janine Kahn. He studied in Paris under the likes of artist Paul Colin. He began to paint while working at the Cinémathèque Française, Éditions Mazenod, and Hachette.

Queneau began exhibiting in 1958 within France and abroad. His paintings were shown at the Foire internationale d'art contemporain in 1985. His paintings were referenced in works by the likes of Marguerite Duras, Patrick Waldberg, Camille Bourniquel, Jacques Réda, Thomas Owen, Claude Esteban, and others. His works were largely centered around literature, with one of his favorite subjects being libraries.

Queneau died on 16 February 2022, at the age of 87.
