= Copia: Foundations of the Abundant Style =

1512 rhetoric textbook by Erasmus

Copia: Foundations of the Abundant Style (Latin: De Utraque Verborum ac Rerum Copia) is a rhetoric textbook written by Dutch humanist Desiderius Erasmus, and first published in 1512. It was a best-seller widely used for teaching how to rewrite pre-existing texts, and how to incorporate them in a new composition. Erasmus systematically instructed on how to embellish, amplify, and give variety to speech and writing.

== Production and publication ==
The first official edition of De Copia, titled De duplici copia rerum ac verborum commentarii duo, was published by Josse Bade in Paris in 1512 and helped establish Erasmus as a major humanist scholar. Erasmus began conceiving the work much earlier, in the 1490s, during a time when creating style manuals for school boys was considered to be a noble calling. It is widely believed that Erasmus left a working copy of the manuscript behind after a trip to Italy (1506–1509) and, upon hearing that an unauthorized version was forthcoming, quickly produced a version to thwart the effort. Though he was reluctant to publish the work in haste, Erasmus hoped to avoid being associated with what he called "a thoroughly bad text" and ultimately produced "the lesser evil of the two". The early draft version of the text that was left behind in Italy is written as a dialogue between two students and is titled Brevis de Copia Praeceptio; it was eventually printed in 1519 as an appendix to the Formulae.

Erasmus did not feel that his work was fully complete with the 1512 edition of De Copia, and he continued to update the work throughout his life. The general concept and structure of the work remained the same over time, even as Erasmus amended and expanded the text. Subsequent authorized editions of De Copia were published in December 1514 (in a volume which also included the Parabolae), April 1517, May 1526, and August 1534.

== Contents ==
Book 1 of De Copia (on verbum or words) contains Erasmus' thoughts on the abundance of expression and is divided into 206 short chapters or sections. The initial chapters concern themselves with general commentary on copia, its advantages, and its importance. Chapters 11–32 then detail twenty methods/varieties of expression, while the remaining chapters provide further examples of variety of expression.

Book 2 (on rerum or argument) deals with abundance of subject matter which Erasmus says, "involves the assembling, explaining, and amplifying of arguments by the use of examples, comparisons, similarities, dissimilarities, opposites, and other like procedures which I shall treat in detail in the appropriate place".

Book I:

Chapters 1–12 A discussion of the general nature and value of the abundant style

Chapters 13 – 33 An analysis of major tropes in classical literature: synecdoche, equivalence, allegory, etc. Chapter 33 is a famous demonstration of variety, where Erasmus illustrates 195 variations on the sentence, "Your letter delighted me greatly." (Latin: Tuae litterae me magnopere delectarunt.)

Chapters 34–94 Feature variations of grammatical and syntactic forms

Chapters 94 – 206 Operate like a Thesaurus, although the organization is haphazard, not alphabetical

Book II : Abundance of Subject Matter

Not divided into chapters, but does address 11 separate methods of using abundant subject matter. Here Erasmus uses a more dialectical approach, and typically gives a few lines of theory followed by many illustrations from classical sources.

== Themes and ideas ==
Erasmus' purpose was to contribute to the existing scholarship on style. To that end, he put forth in De Copia that style must be abundant in order to be effective, and that the abundance consists of two primary elements: variety of expression and variety of subject matter. Variety, he says, "is so powerful in every sphere that there is absolutely nothing, however brilliant, which is not dimmed if not commended by variety".

Written as both a manual on rhetoric and as a treatise against what Erasmus believed to be the "false copia" of the time that was inspired by an overwhelming admiration of the texts of Cicero, De Copia operates in multiple rhetorical spheres, for multiple purposes: mainly as a style guide for students and as an example of Erasmus' rhetorical virtuosity.

== Sources and influences ==
Erasmus wrote Copia while a professor at the University of Cambridge in 1511. He was teaching Greek, but between courses composed several texts designed to instruct Latin. Copia was one such text, perhaps as an attempt to expand on Quintillian's rhetorical guide, Institutio Oratoria.

The first chapter of book 10 in Quintillian's Oratoria is titled "De copia verborum". This is quite possibly where Erasmus received his most direct inspiration for the book. In that 10th chapter, Quintillian declined to give examples for employing the abundant style, on the grounds that each individual case requires a unique solution. This left the door open for Erasmus to detail the abundant style in Copia.

Erasmus acknowledges Quintillian in the preface, and borrows from him (and other classical authors) throughout Copia, sometimes citing, sometimes not. As further revisions of Copia are printed, Erasmus becomes increasingly careful to give credit to previous authors where it is due.

If Quintillian was the philosophical inspiration for Copia, his friend John Colet was most practically responsible. Colet and Erasmus had designs on replacing Medieval teaching with classical Greek and Latin writings. While Erasmus was at Cambridge, Colet was teaching at St. Paul's school in London. Colet requested that Erasmus pen something on rhetoric for him to teach at St. Paul's, and Erasmus presented him with Copia, dedicating the book to Colet in the preface.

== Reception ==
While designed as a university textbook, Copia enjoyed far broader appeal. The book was immensely popular in England and in Europe, at least 85 editions of the book were printed in Erasmus' own lifetime, and countless more after that. Erasmus made three separate revisions to the original text, adding chapters each time. The original 1512 edition contained 153 chapters, which swelled to 206 in the final version that Erasmus completed before his death.

== See also ==
- Exercises in Style, 20th century French book, illustrating variations
- Commonplace book
