= Aristophane =

Guadeloupe-born cartoonist

- Born: Firmin Aristophane Boulon; January 8, 1967 Baillif, Guadeloupe
- Died: May 11, 2004 (aged 37) Dissay, France
- Areas: Cartoonist, Writer, Artist
- Notable works: Les sœurs Zabîme,Conte Démoniaque

Firmin Aristophane Boulon (or simply Aristophane; 1967–2004) was a Guadeloupe-born cartoonist.

== Career ==
A graduate of the French schools École nationale supérieure des Beaux-Arts and the École européenne supérieure de l’image, Aristophane began work "preoccupied with evil and frailty as viewed through the lives of demons and mythological creatures."

His first work to receive attention was his 300-page graphic novel Conté Demoniaque ("Demonic Tale"): an epic set in hell inspired by Dante's Inferno, Paradise Lost, the philosophy of Max Stirner and the artist Gustave Doré. 50 of its pages were exhibited in the "Angels and Demons" during the 1994 Angoulême comics festival in the Centre National de la Bande Dessinée et de l’Image.

Sometime during 1998, Aristophane suffered a domestic accident that left him severely burned on the face and hands and was hospitalised in Nantes. Following this accident he burned all the original art of his breakthrough work Conté Demoniaque and Faune, which he considered blasphemous after converting to Hinduism. His last published work during his lifetime was the story "La Sentinelle" ("The Sentinel") in Ego Comme X no. 6 in 1999.

His 1996 graphic novel, Les sœurs Zabîme, is about children in Guadeloupe and considered a "small masterpiece." It was his final completed major work.

In school, he had been told, "In painting, everything has been explored. The future belongs to comics."

== Works ==
- Short works and Faune in Lapin no. 2, 4-5, 8-9 and 11 (1992-1996)
- Logorrhée ("Logorrhea", 1993)
- Le vieux Samson ("Old Samson") in le Cheval sans Tête no. 3-5 (1993)
- Tu Rêves Lili ("You Dream Lili"), children's book written by Christiane Renauld (1993)
- Short works and Les sept fantômes ("The seven ghosts") in Le Lézard no. 8-12 (1993-1996)
- "Le mauvaise odeur" ("The bad smell") in Bananas no. 3 (1995)
- Faune, ou l'histoire d'un immorale (1995)
- "Monde virtuel" in Avoir 20 ans en l'an 2000 (1995)
- Conte Démoniaque ("Demonic Tale", 1996)
- Les sœurs Zabîme ("The Zabime sisters", 1996)
- Short works and Shri-Ganesha ("The seven ghosts") in Jade no. 1, 4, 9, 11-13 and 15 (1995-1998)
- Short works and Les sœurs Zabîme in Ego Comme X no. 1-6 (1994-1999)
- The Zabîme Sisters (translated by Matt Madden 2010)
