= Zazie dans le Métro (novel) =

French novel written in 1959 by Raymond Queneau

Zazie in the Metro
- First English version
- Author: Raymond Queneau
- Original title: Zazie dans le Métro
- Language: French
- Published: 1959 (Gallimard) (French); Olympia (English)
- Publication place: France
- Media type: Print
- OCLC: 43955523

Zazie dans le Métro (translated as both Zazie in the Metro and Zazie) is a French novel written in 1959 by Raymond Queneau, and his first major success.

== Plot ==
Zazie, a foul-mouthed provincial girl, is dropped off at a Paris railway station to spend a weekend with her uncle Gabriel while her mother Jeanne Lalochère spends time with her lover. Zazie tells Gabriel that she wants to visit the Paris Métro, but Gabriel tells her she cannot as it is closed due to a strike. The two are driven off to Gabriel's apartment by Gabriel's friend Charles, a taxi driver. Upon arriving, Zazie encounters Turandot, the manager of La Cave, a restaurant under Gabriel's apartment, his pet parrot Laverdure, and Gabriel's wife Marceline.

The following day, Zazie leaves the apartment while Gabriel is sleeping to visit the subway by herself. She encounters a strange man implied to be a paedophile (or "satyr") who takes her to a flea market and buys her blue jeans. Gabriel learns from Gridoux, a cobbler and neighbour that she ran away after Turandot confronted her for running off. Zazie brings the man back to the apartment, and he identifies himself as "Pédro-Surplus" and accuses Zazie of stealing the jeans from him. When the man begins talking to Marceline, Gabriel kicks him out of the apartment. While serving food to Gridoux, Mado P'tits-Pieds, a waitress at La Cave tells him about her romantic interest in Charles.

Gabriel, Zazie and Charles then visit the Eiffel Tower. Gabriel soon goes down to the bottom due to vertigo. Charles then joins him without Zazie and tells him that he will drive home without them. When Zazie reunites with Gabriel, they encounter a group of foreign tourists guided by Fédor Balanovitch, who recognises Gabriel as a drag dancer. Throughout the rest of the novel, Zazie asks Gabriel if he is a "hormosessuel" (homosexual), to which he vigorously denies. The two are briefly pulled into the tour bus during a stampede of tourists, and jump off at a red light whereupon they encounter the aristocratic Widow Mouaque. When Gabriel is pulled into a car by tourists and kidnapped, a police officer named Trouscaillon comes to help Zazie and the Widow Mouaque. With his help, they find Gabriel, who invites Fédor Balanovitch's tourists to see his drag show.

Later, after Mado and Charles agree to get married, Gabriel also invites them, along with Gridoux and Turandot to watch his drag show with Zazie and the Widow Mouaque. As they are watching the show along with Laverdure and the tourists, a man identifying himself as "Bertin Poirée" enters Gabriel's apartment. He reveals to Marceline that he was also Trouscaillon and that he was also the satyr Zazie brought home earlier in the day. He attempts to seduce Marceline, but she flees from the apartment.

After the show, Charles and Mado drive home, and the tourists are driven back to their hotel by Fédor Balanovitch, while Gabriel, Zazie, Mouaque, Turandot, Gridoux and Laverdure encounter Trouscaillon again and identify him as the satyr from earlier in the morning. Trouscaillon is suddenly arrested for impersonating a police officer, breaking the widow's heart as she has fallen in love with him. Gabriel invites her to have onion soup with them to feel better.

While at the restaurant, Zazie falls asleep, and a large brawl erupts between the customers and the restaurant's staff. After Gabriel wins the fight, they see a large battalion of soldiers outside the restaurant, led by the satyr. When the Widow Mouaque exits the restaurant to approach him, she is killed in a hail of bullets. The satyr identifies himself now as "Aroun Arachide" and attempts to attack Gabriel and his friends with his soldiers, but they escape through a lift into the subway. The elevator operator tells them that the subway is now working again and they can use it to return home, and takes the sleeping Zazie with him, as he also has her suitcase. The next day, Jeanne Lalochère is reunited with Zazie at the train station by a man named Marcel. Zazie tells her mother that she did not see the subway during her stay in Paris but instead got older. Marcel is implied to be Marceline, leaving the question of Gabriel's sexual orientation ambiguous.

== Language ==
Zazie explores colloquial language as opposed to "standard" written French; Queneau referred to the language spoken by Zazie and the other characters as "neo-French". It is marked by colloquial diction and slang, by phonetic spelling, and by "the morpho-syntax typical of spoken French". For instance, the first word of the book, the neologism Doukipudonktan, is a phonetic transcription of D'où (est-ce) qu'il pue donc tant ? ("From where does he/do they/does it stink so much?"). In the English version of the novel, this is rendered as "Holifart watastink"; in the movie version the English subtitle reads "Whozit who stinks?"

According to a 1959 article from Elle, "to speak Zazie" was all the rage in France.

== Adaptations ==
In 1960 the book was adapted by Louis Malle into a film of the same name, starring Catherine Demongeot as Zazie and Philippe Noiret as Gabriel. In the film, Zazie is younger than in the book (where her mother is worried about Zazie's virginity). The book was also adapted for theatre and published as a comic book as well.

== Publication details ==
- ISBN 0-14-218004-1 (Penguin paperback, translated by Barbara Wright)
- ISBN 2-07-052813-8 (Éditions Gallimard Jeunesse, Paris 1999)

== See also ==
- Le Monde's 100 Books of the Century
