= Homeoptoton =

Figure of speech

The homeoptoton (from the Greek homoióptoton, "similar in the cases") is a figure of speech consisting in ending the last words of a distinct part of the speech with the same syllable or letter.

== Example ==
"In necessariis unitas, in dubiis libertas, in omnibus caritas" ("In necessary things unity, in doubtful things liberty, in all things charity").

"Hominem laudem egentem virtutis, abundantem felicitates" ("Am I to praise a man abounding in good luck, but lacking in virtue?").
