= Jessica Abel =

American cartoonist

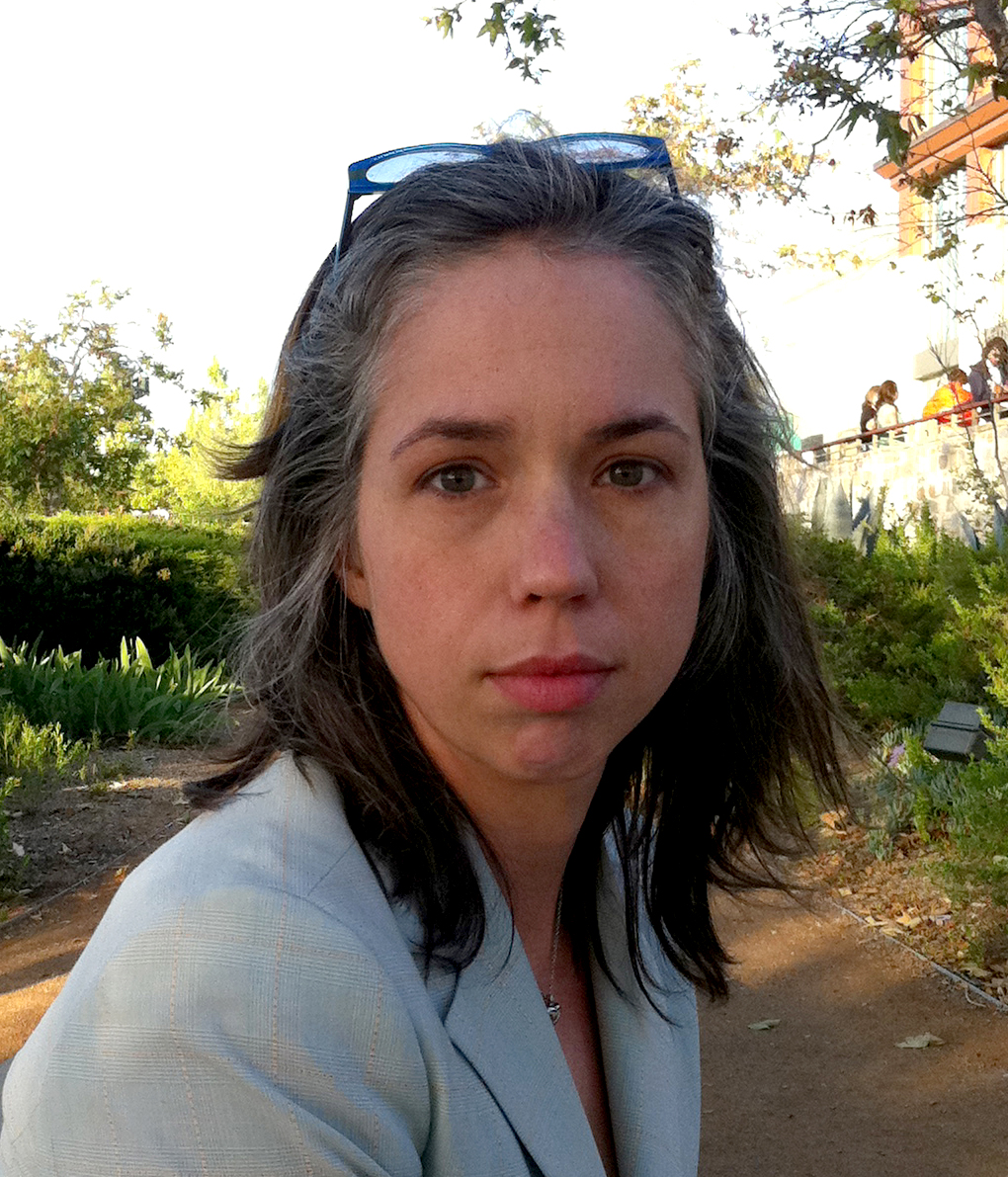
- Jessica Abel in April 2011
- Born: Jessica Courtney Clare Abel; 1969 (age 56–57) Chicago, Illinois
- Areas: Cartoonist, Writer, Artist
- Notable works: Artbabe; La Perdida; Drawing Words and Writing Pictures; Radio: An Illustrated Guide; Out On The Wire
- Awards: Xeric Award, 1995; Harvey Award, 1997, 2002
- Spouse: Matt Madden

Jessica Abel (born 1969) is an American cartoonist, author and educator. Her works include Artbabe, La Perdida, Radio: An Illustrated Guide (with collaborator Ira Glass), Drawing Words and Writing Pictures, and Out On The Wire. She chaired the illustration department at the Pennsylvania Academy of the Fine Arts for several years and also works as a coach for creative professionals.

== Early life ==
Abel was born in 1969 in Chicago, Illinois, and raised in the Chicago metropolitan area. She graduated from Evanston Township High School. She attended Carleton College for in 1987–88, and then transferred to the University of Chicago, where she published her first comics work in 1988, in the student anthology Breakdown. She also held administrative positions including Assistant to the Associate Dean and graduate and undergraduate chairs at SAIC. She graduated with a BA degree.

== Career ==
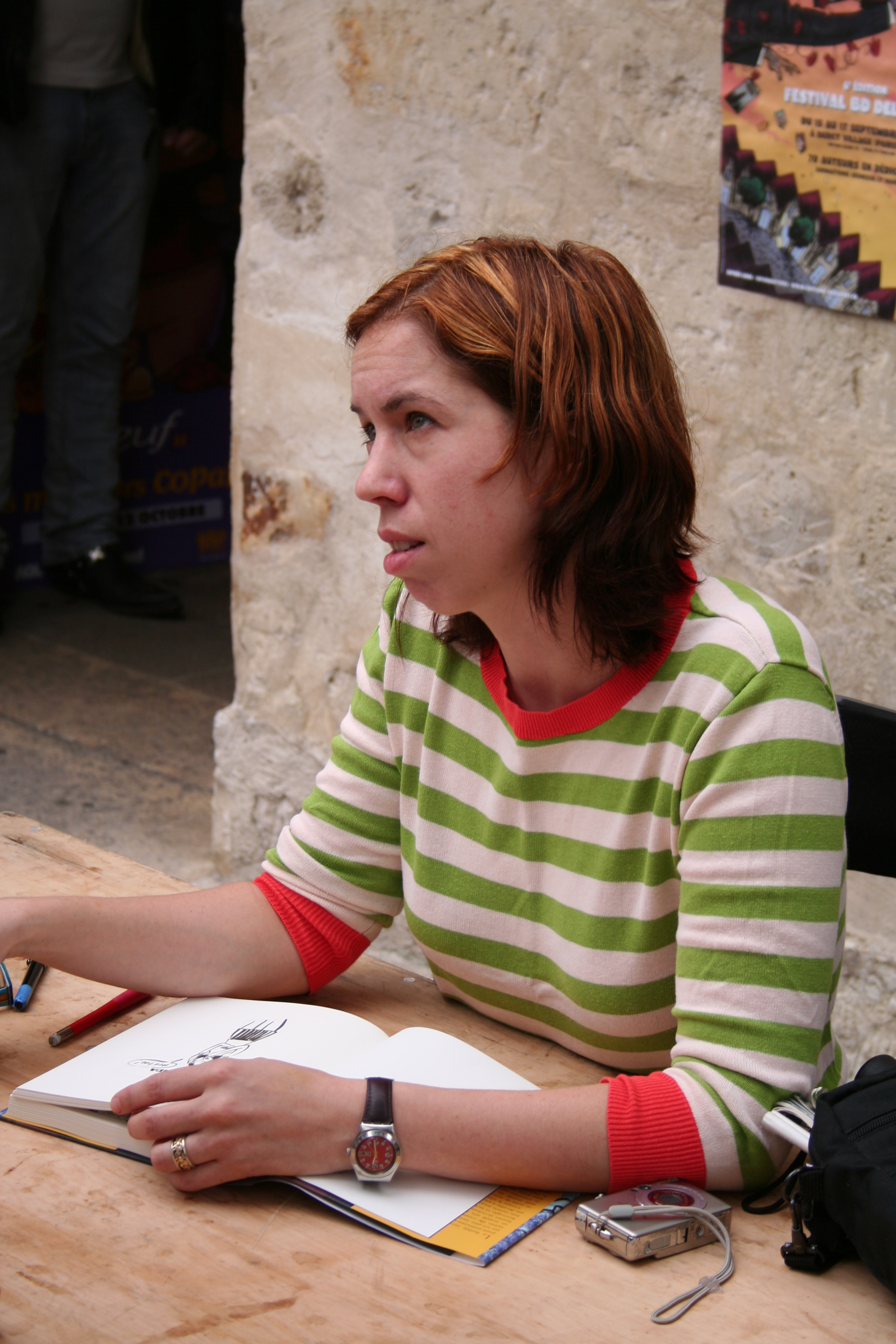
Abel at Delcourt Festival in Paris, France in 2006

Abel began her comics career through minicomics, self-publishing the photocopied, hand-sewn and embellished comic book Artbabe in 1992. Four annual issues followed, with Abel winning a Xeric Foundation grant to self-publish and distribute issue #5. With the publication of the Xeric issue of Artbabe, Abel came to the attention of Fantagraphics publisher Gary Groth, who offered to publish Artbabe. Each issue of Artbabe contained one or more complete stories; Abel did not begin any longer sequential work until La Perdida in 2000. She has stated that Artbabe is not autobiographical. In 1998, Abel moved to Mexico City with her boyfriend, now husband, comics artist Matt Madden. She went on hiatus from Artbabe in 1999.

From 1996 to 2005, Abel did a series of one-page journalistic comics for the University of Chicago Magazine. In 1997 she self-published Jessica Abel, Intrepid Girl Reporter, a 20-page minicomic collecting her various journalistic comic strips from that and other publications. Material from this mini was later reprinted in Abel's collections, Soundtrack and Mirror, Window. For LA Weekly in 2000 and 2001, she did a number of comics journalism pieces on such topics as the 2000 Democratic National Convention and evacuating from Lower Manhattan after the September 11 attacks. During this period she embarked on Radio: an Illustrated Guide for the radio program This American Life. This book depicted how an episode of the show is made, with behind-the-scenes reportage and a how-to guide to creating a radio show at home.

After two years in Mexico City, Abel moved to Brooklyn, New York. Abel wrote and illustrated La Perdida, published by Fantagraphics Books between 2000 and 2005 as a five-part mini-series. She revised the text for its compilation and publication in 2006 as a hardcover volume by Pantheon Books. The central character is a Mexican-American woman, Carla, raised by her Anglo mother, who moves on a whim to Mexico City to search for her identity. The book has received a positive critical response.

Abel taught undergraduate cartooning courses at the School of Visual Arts for a number of years, and gave workshops at other locations, such as Ox-Bow Summer School of Art.

In 2008, Abel and Madden produced Drawing Words and Writing Pictures for First Second Books. A comprehensive manual on creating comics, the book was a product of the years Abel and Madden spent as teachers. That same year, Abel also collaborated on Life Sucks, written with Gabe Soria and Warren Pleece. Abel and Madden produced a second comics teaching textbook together called Mastering Comics, published in May 2012.

In 2012, Abel and Madden moved to France for a one-year artists’ residency at La Maison des Auteurs in Angoulême that became an extended four-year stay. In 2015, while still based in France, Abel began publishing Trish Trash, Rollergirl of Mars, a science fiction comic following a young hoverderby player on a colonized future Mars. The first volume appeared in French as Trish Trash, Rollergirl sur Mars, tome 1 (Dargaud, 2015), with the English-language edition following in three volumes (NBM/Papercutz and Super Genius, 2017–2018). The series was subsequently collected as Trish Trash: Rollergirl of Mars — The Collected Edition (Super Genius, 2018), receiving coverage in NPR. In 2019, Dargaud published a French omnibus edition, Rollergirl sur Mars — Intégrale, which was reviewed in BD Gest'.

In 2015, Abel published a sequel to her 1999 comic Radio: An Illustrated Guide called Out On The Wire: The Storytelling Secrets of the New Masters of Radio. Out on the Wire examines narrative storytelling through interviews with producers from This American Life, Radiolab, Planet Money, and other radio and podcast programs. The book received positive reviews from Kirkus Reviews, the Los Angeles Times, Publishers Weekly, and the Chicago Reader.

In 2016, Abel returned to the United States to accept a position as chair of the brand-new illustration department at the Pennsylvania Academy of the Fine Arts (PAFA). She served in that position until the summer of 2024, when PAFA closed its degree programs.

In 2017, Abel self-published Growing Gills: How to Find Creative Focus When You're Drowning in Your Daily Life, a guide to creative productivity for working artists and writers. It was positively reviewed in Publishers Weekly. Abel also blogs on this subject and offers individual coaching. Her work in this area has been cited by Oliver Burkeman.

== Personal life ==
Abel is married to Matt Madden and has two children.

== Exhibitions ==
Abel's one-person exhibitions include "Corridoio Altervox" in Rome, the Phoenix Gallery in Brighton; the Oporto International Comics Festival in Portugal, Viñetas desde o Atlántico in A Coruna, Spain, and the Naples Comicon.

Her group exhibitions include the Jean Albano Gallery in Chicago, Athaneum, Stripdagen, in the Netherlands, the Davidson Galleries in Seattle, the Forbes Gallery at the Hyde Park Art Center, in New York, the Regina Miller Gallery and Vox Gallery in Philadelphia, Centre National de la Bande Dessinée et de l'Image in Angoulême, France, and the Norman Rockwell Museum in Stockbridge, Massachusetts.

== Fictional depictions ==
Abel appears as a character in the back-cover story of Hate #10 (Fall 1992) by Peter Bagge.

== Awards and honors ==
- Chicago Artists International Program Grant
- 1995 Xeric Grant (Artbabe)
- 1997:
  - Harvey Award for Best New Talent
  - Kimberly Yale Award for Best New Talent (Friends of Lulu)
- 2002 Harvey Award for Best New Series (La Perdida)
- 2006 (Finalist) Cybils Award (La Perdida)
- 2008 (Finalist) Cybils Award (Life Sucks)
- 2009 Great Graphic Novels for Teens top ten (Life Sucks)
- 2009 (nomination) Eisner Award for Best Comics-Related Book (Drawing Words & Writing Pictures)
- 2013 (nomination) Eisner Award for Best Comics-Related Book (Mastering Comics)
- 2017 (nomination) Eisner Award for Best Publication for Teens for Trish Trash: Rollergirl of Mars

== Bibliography ==
- (with Ira Glass) Radio: An Illustrated Guide, (WBEZ Alliance, 1999) ISBN 978-0-9679671-0-3
- Soundtrack: Short Stories 1989–1996 (Fantagraphics Books, 2001) ISBN 978-1-56097-430-7
- Mirror, Window: An Artbabe Collection (Fantagraphics Books, 2000) ISBN 978-1-56097-384-3; compilation of Artbabe Vol. 2, nos. 1–4 (1997–1999)
- La Perdida (Pantheon Books, 2006) ISBN 978-0-375-42365-9; a revised compilation of La Perdida nos. 1–5 (2001–2005, Fantagraphics Books)
- (Illustrator, with editor Carrie Russell) Complete Copyright: An Everyday Guide for Librarians (American Library Association, 2004) ISBN 0-8389-3543-5
- (with writer Gabriel Soria and artist Warren Pleece) Life Sucks (First Second, 2008) ISBN 978-1-59643-107-2
- (with Matt Madden) Drawing Words and Writing Pictures, (First Second, 2008) ISBN 978-1-59643-131-7
- (with Matt Madden) Mastering Comics: Drawing Words & Writing Pictures Continued (First Second, 2012) ISBN 978-1596436176
- (with Matt Madden and Lewis Trondheim) Cavalcade Surprise (L'Association, 2014) ISBN 978-2844144973
- Out On The Wire: The Storytelling Secrets of the New Masters of Radio (Crown, 2015) ISBN 978-0385348430
- Trish Trash, Rollergirl sur Mars vol. 1 (Dargaud, 2015) ISBN 978-2205063585 — in French
  - translated as Trish Trash, Rollergirl of Mars vol. 1 (NBM/Papercutz, 2017) ISBN 978-1629916149
- Trish Trash #2 (Super Genius, 2017) ISBN 978-1629916392
- Growing Gills: How to Find Creative Focus When You’re Drowning in Your Daily Life (self-published, 2017) ISBN 978-1521277874
- Trish Trash #3 (Super Genius, 2018) ISBN 978-1545800164
- Trish Trash: Rollergirl of Mars — The Collected Edition (Super Genius, 2018) ISBN 978-1545801673
- Rollergirl sur Mars — Intégrale (Dargaud, 2019) ISBN 978-2205072815 — in French

== See also ==
- List of women comics writers and artists
- List of American comics creators
