= Catherine Demongeot =

French actress

Catherine Demongeot (French: [katʁin dəmɔ̃ʒo]; born 16 May 1950 in Paris) is a French former child actress. Her debut role was Zazie in Zazie dans le Métro (1960); this was followed by only a few more films. According to an interview with Vincent Malle (film producer, and brother of Louis Malle) for the UK DVD release of Zazie (2006, Optimum Releasing), Demongeot never made another film and later went on to become a teacher.

Although Vladimir Nabokov originally thought that Sue Lyon was the right selection to play Lolita in Stanley Kubrick's film of that name, years later Nabokov said that the ideal Lolita would have been Demongeot.

== Selected filmography ==
- Zazie dans le Métro (1960)
- Une femme est une femme (1961, not mentioned)
- Faites sauter la banque! (1964)
- Mise à sac (1967)
