= Portrait (literature) =

The portrait, as a literary genre, is a written description or analysis of a person or thing. A written portrait often gives deep insight, and offers an analysis that goes far beyond the superficial. It is considered a parallel to pictorial portraiture.

The imitation of painting is apparent in the name of the genre itself, which is a painting term. Historians of antiquity recognised the task of the portrait as representation; we find the beginnings of the narrative portrait in Livy and Tacitus. However, the portrait began to emerge from the need to describe yourself (self-portrait) or one's contemporaries, as in the Essays of Montaigne. This latter work develops a line of questioning around the movement of the representation of the individual (or of a society) from the pictorial mode to the discursive mode.

The portrait can be realised in prose or in verse. Its objectives vary according to context: sociocultural, sociopolitical, historical, or again according to the subjectivity of the portraitist (the writer). Thus one can speak of a fictional portrait (corresponding to the characters who populate the fictional universe of each author) as much as a realist one (representing real-life people).

The portrait oscillates between reality and fiction, between eulogy and satire, between one portrait which imitates its original and another which moves away from it (such as the caricatures found in newspapers or in Molière). Nevertheless, the objective portrait which describes the flaws and qualities of the individual represented (or equally the object or the idea) is quite widespread. The literary portrait evolved through the centuries and its development has been shaped by writers as well as literary critics and theorists.

== The portrait in the seventeenth century ==
It is from the 1650s that the portrait began to be defined as a literary genre. It is through the social innovations of the précieuses - such as La Grande Mademoiselle who, influenced by the portrait-laden works of Madeleine de Scudéry, gathered around her (as a salonnière or ‘salon hostess’) men of letters - that the portrait was transformed into a ‘diversion of society’.

The literary portrait held to the essential aesthetic rules of the pictorial mode - that is, it had to describe the individual (model) faithfully in order to distinguish it as a type apart. Nevertheless, it was not to be inferred from the recognition of the individual represented, but rather from the portraitist's style. This narrative representation had the function of highlighting fixed and timeless physical and mental features, as one sees in the works of Molière or in the Caractères by Jean de La Bruyère. It had to be achieved through layers of successive description - as in painting - which were only distinct phrases describing the real model's features.

== The portrait in the eighteenth century ==
The Age of Enlightenment heralded a new phase in the development of the literary portrait. It invaded literature and even contaminated music. Mozart and Beethoven excelled in this genre. Nevertheless, the portrait carried more of the psychology of the model represented than his or her physical appearance.

In Denis Diderot, it is precisely the pictorial portrait that is the occasion of a narrative self-portrait effected in the form of an artistic critique of the paintings and statues which were made of him. Thus he did not like the painting by Louis Michel van Loo portraying him:

Quite alive; it’s his gentleness, with his vivacity; but too young, head too small, pretty like a woman, ogling, smiling, cute, giving a small kiss, affected mouth […] Sparkling close up, vigorous from afar, especially the skin. Besides, well-modelled beautiful hands, except the left, which is not drawn. We see it from the front; his head is bare; his grey tufts, with his preciousness, gives him the appearance of an old coquette who is still loveable; the position of a secretary of state and not a philosopher. The falsity of the first moment influenced everything else.

The philosopher blamed the painter's wife for having prevented him from being himself: “It is this madwoman, madame Van Loo, who had come to gossip with him while he was being painted, who gave him that air, and who spoiled everything.” Diderot took to imagining what his portrait would have been like:

If she had taken to her harpsichord and improvised, or sung

Non ha ragione, ingrate, Un core abbandonato

or some other piece of the same genre, the sensitive philosopher would have taken an altogether different character; and the portrait would have been effective. Or better still he had been left alone and abandoned to his reverie. So would the mouth have been ajar, his distracted looks would have been carried away, the inner workings of his head would have been painted on his face, and Michel would have done a beautiful thing.

After criticizing the portrait that portrays him, he writes:

But what will my little children say when they come to compare my sad works with that laughing, cute, effeminate old flirt there?

He informs them, “My children, I tell you that it is not me,” and undertakes to trace in writing the real portrait of himself:

I had in one day a hundred different physiognomies, according to the thing by which I was affected. I was serene, sad, dreamy, tender, violent, passionate, enthusiastic; but I was never such as you see me there. I had a large forehead, very lively eyes, broad features, a head quite like an ancient orator, a bonhomie that touched very closely the stupidity and rustic character of former times. Without the exaggeration of all the features in the engraving made from Greuze’s pencil, I would have been infinitely better. I have a mask that deceives the artist; either there is too much melted together or the impressions of my soul succeed each other very quickly and paint themselves all over my face: the eye of the painter does not find me the same from one moment to the other; his task becomes much more difficult than he had believed it to be.

According to Diderot, only one painter managed to make a pictorial portrait of him in which he recognizes himself and that is Jean-Baptiste Garand: by an apparent irony of fate, this success was the result of chance:

It never was done well save by a poor devil named Garand, who caught me, as happens to a fool who says a good word. Whoever sees my portrait by Garand, sees me. Ecco il vero Pulcinella.

Moreover, the semi-private sphere of correspondence also allowed the sketching of portraits in principle intended solely for the use of the recipient of the letter. Thus, Marie Du Deffand, taking the thermal waters at Forges-les-Eaux, was able to draw a sharp and cheerful portrait of Madame de Pecquigny, the companion that fate had assigned her during her treatment:

La Pecquigny is no resource, and her spirit is like space; there is no extension, depth, and perhaps all the other dimensions that I can not say, because I do not know them; but this is only empty for use. She has felt everything, judged everything, tested everything, chosen everything, rejected everything; she is, she says, a singular difficulty in company, and yet all day long she jabbers with our little ladies like a magpie.

However, it is not so much her spirit - or the way she uses it - that irritates Marie Du Deffand as the woman's quirks:

But that’s not what I do not like about her. It’s convenient for me today and it will be very pleasant for me as soon as Forment arrives. What is unbearable to me is dinner. She looks crazy while eating; she breaks up a chicken in the dish where it is served, then she puts it in another, has brought broth to put on it, just like the one she makes, and then she takes a wing, then the body, of which she only eats half, and then she does not want us to turn the calf to cut a bone, lest we soften the skin; she cuts a bone with all possible pain, she gnaws half of it, then returns to her hen; it lasts two hours. She has on her plate heaps of gnawed bones, of sucked skins, and, during that time, either I am bored to death or I eat more than I should. It is a curious thing to see her eat a biscuit; it lasts half an hour and the fact of the matter is that she eats like a wolf. It truly is an enraging exercise.

Marie Du Deffand completes this portrait of an eccentric by linking her to her interlocutor: “I am sorry that you have in common with her the impossibility of staying a minute at rest.” After which she concludes, in accordance with the philosophy of resignation and disinterest she defends, the temporary nature of that which she will have to endure on this “holiday meeting”:

Finally - do you want me to tell you? She is no less amiable. She has no doubt of her wit. But all this is poorly digested, and I do not think it is worth more. She lives comfortably, but I would challenge her to be difficult with me. I submit to all her whims because she does nothing to me. Our present union will be of no consequence for the future.

== The portrait of the nineteenth century ==
The evolution of the narrative portrait did not stop at the nineteenth century but, on the contrary, it became more refined and took on nuances through the intervention of Sainte-Beuve in the works or the critiques of such literary portraits.

In fact, the portrait found a true place in the novel where it represented not only real-life individuals but also fictional individuals (who could also be symbolic). It is in this way that the portrait became a predominant and recurring theme in the work of Balzac.

== The portrait of the twentieth century ==
The portrait continued its journey throughout the twentieth century with the modern novel. In Nathalie Sarraute (in the Portrait d'un inconnu) the features are not fixed, the temporality plays its role in the genre of the moving portrait, progressive, fragmented, as in the life of a human.

== The portrait of the twenty-first century ==
As an evolution of the portrait in twenty-first century literature, the writer & artist Ox Maló promoted the execution of the live portraying in the form of a participatory performance. The person portrayed sits in front of the writer, the writer observes and writes a poem on the spot with his typewriter. The poem-portrait is given to the person as a gift. The Written Portraits Performance format has included other disciplines such as dance, painting and music, inviting different artists to portray live.
