= Zazie dans le Métro =

1960 film by Louis Malle

- Theatrical release poster
- Directed by: Louis Malle
- Screenplay by: Louis Malle; Jean-Paul Rappeneau
- Based on: Zazie dans le Métro by Raymond Queneau
- Produced by: Louis Malle
- Starring: Catherine Demongeot; Philippe Noiret
- Cinematography: Henri Raichi
- Edited by: Kenout Peltier
- Music by: Fiorenzo Carpi; André Pontin
- Production company: Nouvelles Éditions de Films
- Distributed by: Consortium Pathé
- Release date: 28 October 1960
- Running time: 89 minutes
- Country: France
- Language: French

Zazie dans le Métro (translated as Zazie in the Metro and sometimes called Zazie) is a 1960 French comedy film directed by Louis Malle, based on the 1959 novel of the same name by Raymond Queneau. Frequently surreal, and full of visual and verbal jokes, the plot follows a group of protean characters around a crowded Paris during a Métro strike.

== Plot ==
At a Paris railway terminus, Gabriel greets his sister Jeanne, who leaves her ten-year-old daughter Zazie with him and goes off with her latest lover. Gabriel takes the child out to the taxi of his friend Charles, to Zazie's dismay: she wants to go on the Métro, but the workers are on strike. They arrive at Turandot's café, above which Gabriel lodges, and he hands the child over to his wife Albertine, who puts her to bed. Gabriel gets himself ready to go to work, on the way out getting into a dispute with Turandot, who is appalled by Zazie's precocity and filthy language.

In the morning, Zazie sneaks out alone but Turandot spots her and follows her. When he tries to take her home, she accuses him of paedophilia and a crowd gathers. Turandot is obliged to slink away and, when Gabriel returns from work, over several glasses tells him what has happened. After talking to Gridoux, the cobbler next door, instead of searching, Gabriel decides to go to bed. Zazie meanwhile is happily exploring Paris, trying every Métro station but all are shut. An elegant man picks her up and takes her to the flea market, where he buys her a pair of jeans and treats her to a dish of mussels. To reward his curiosity about her, she tells him how her mother killed her father gruesomely with an axe but was acquitted. She then describes life with her mother's lover, who got too interested in her, so she has been passed on to her uncle.

Sensing that the stranger also is getting too interested in her, she picks up her jeans and leaves. He accuses her of theft and a crowd gathers. He pretends to be a plain-clothes policeman and escorts Zazie back to her uncle's apartment, where a surprised Gabriel submits to the fake cop's interrogation. After a suggestion that Gabriel is prostituting the forward little girl, he is forced to reveal what his night job is: a drag act in a club. After the alleged cop then accuses Gabriel of homosexuality, he is thrown out of the flat and retreats to the bar below. Meanwhile, the café waitress, Mado, takes lunch to Gridoux next door, who is concerned over the nosy stranger. She however wants to talk about the cabbie Charles, who she hopes will marry her. When she goes back to her work, the stranger tries to pump the intractable Gridoux.

Gabriel and Charles now set off to show Zazie the sights of Paris. Various adventures and misunderstandings follow, particularly at the top of the Eiffel Tower. Zazie keeps annoying both men by trying to find out if her uncle is really homosexual. He however is a hit with a group of good-looking German girls, who think he is cute. As he walks along with Zazie, still pestering him over his sexuality, the two attract the attention of the overdressed widow Moaque. When the German girls descend on Gabriel and drag him onto their tour bus as their mascot, she finds a policeman to report this kidnapping. The cop, called Trouscaillon and identical to the man who earlier accused Gabriel of pimping and illegal sex, immediately becomes the object of Mouaque's desire.

After various adventures and misunderstandings, the three eventually find Gabriel, who has invited the German girls to see his show that night. He then invites Moaque and Trouscaillon to eat with him and Zazie at a restaurant. Seeking attention, Zazie does not behave well. Ringing the bar below his flat, Gabriel asks the waitress Mado to ask his wife Albertine to bring his costume to the club, as he is busy entertaining his friends. Mado tells him that the cabbie Charles has at last proposed, so Gabriel asks the two to join his swelling party. At the club, Gabriel orders champagne for his friends and waits anxiously for his costume. Albertine has however fallen asleep, to be woken by the fake cop from the morning who starts another of his bizarre interrogations. When he moves from words to attempted rape, she jumps out of the window. After his drag act, for which Albertine brought him a dress just in time, he takes everybody off to a bar. What starts with a couple slapping each other turns into a massive saloon brawl, which wrecks the place and brings on an army of cops. The group are rescued by Albertine who shows them a way into the Métro tunnels, and as they descend into the station, all the escalators of the Métro start up because the strike is over. Exhausted, Zazie sleeps through her Métro ride!

In the closing scene, Albertine carries the sleeping child to the railway station, where her mother Jeanne regrets that she will have to find a better-performing lover. Waking up, Zazie says her experiences have made her a bit more grown-up although- having failed to awaken earlier- she bemoans the "fact" that she has not ridden the Métro (as noted above, the ride in fact took place without Zazie's knowledge).

== Cast ==
- Catherine Demongeot as Zazie
- Philippe Noiret as Uncle Gabriel
- Hubert Deschamps as Turandot
- Carla Marlier as Albertine
- Annie Fratellini as Mado
- Vittorio Caprioli as Trouscaillon
- Jacques Dufilho as Ferdinand Grédoux
- Yvonne Clech as Madame Mouaque
- Odette Piquet as Zazie's mother
- Nicolas Bataille as Fédor
- Antoine Roblot as Charles
- Marc Doelnitz as M. Coquetti

== Production ==
William Klein was a great admirer of Queneau's work and had been working on adapting his books when Louis Malle approached him about co-directing Zazie dans le Métro. Klein was skeptical about how that would work, but he agreed to meet with Malle. After discussing the project, both agreed that Klein could function as an art director, finding visuals that corresponded to the writing.

Klein had never been close to the making of a commercial film before, and after the first day, he realized it was absurd that anyone could say they were co-directing a film, partly because all decisions on-set had to come from Malle.

On the second day, Klein saw rushes for the first time when he viewed them with the rest of the crew. After seeing one particular scene shot four to six times, Klein thought the repetition looked interesting and suggested they use it in the film and repeat a bit of dialogue a few times. His idea was greeted with silence, and it was then that Klein realized that co-directing would be impossible.

Nevertheless, Klein continued to work on the film, having already convinced them to use only two lenses, one of which was a telephoto lens and the other a wide angle lens. He even shot some sequences using a handheld camera that would ultimately appear in the film.

Klein also suggested making large posters like big advertisements that used abstract letters, reflecting some of the made-up words in Queneau's book. All the indoor shooting was also dominated by the electric light advertising outside of the windows, an idea inspired by Klein's own film, Broadway by Light.

When the film was completed, Klein would be credited as an "artistic consultant."

While several characters refer to a building as Sainte-Chapelle, it is in fact Saint-Vincent-de-Paul.

== Reception ==
The film received 854,495 admissions in France when released to cinemas. Bosley Crowther called it "an elaborate French exercise in cinematic Dadaism" and further stated, "The trouble (a gentle word for it!) with his picture simply is that there is no rhyme nor reason in it, no statement, no purpose and no point. It is strictly anarchism with a camera, crazy images created for the images' sake." Decades after its release, Jonathan Rosenbaum wrote that it was "arguably Louis Malle's best work ... A rather sharp, albeit soulless, film, packed with ideas and glitter and certainly worth a look." Richard Ayoade said that Zazie dans le Metro "isn't necessarily my favourite film, nor is it really 'in the canon' as a great piece of story construction. It's not even Louis Malle's best film. But I associate it with pure pleasure and joy. It was the first film I wanted to study and rewatch; it sparked my interest in film‑making."

Japanese filmmaker Akira Kurosawa cited this movie as one of his 100 favorite films.

== Home video ==
A digitally restored version of the film was released on DVD and Blu-ray by the Criterion Collection in June 2011.
