= Reading Pound Reading =

Book on Ezra Pound by Kathryne V. Lindberg

Reading Pound Reading: Modernism After Nietzsche
- Cover of first edition
- Author: Kathryne V. Lindberg
- Language: English
- Subject: Literary criticism
- Publisher: Oxford University Press
- Publication date: 1987
- Publication place: United Kingdom
- Media type: Print
- Pages: 306
- ISBN: 978-0195041651

Reading Pound Reading: Modernism After Nietzsche is a 1987 book on Ezra Pound by the literary scholar and professor Kathryne V. Lindberg. Lindberg considers the influence of Nietzsche (usually at second- and third-hand through Pound's reading of other writers) upon the prose criticism of Ezra Pound, including his essay "How to Read," his books The ABC of Reading and Guide to Kulchur, as well as in more ephemeral and fugitive sources such as newspapers and obscure literary journals.

== Overview ==
Lindberg examines Ezra Pound's prose critical writings, arguing that they reflect a critical approach comparable to that of Friedrich Nietzsche. Conceding that Pound read little if any of Nietzsche's writings, Lindberg offers evidence that Pound was influenced by Nietzsche through other writers principally the French man of letters Remy de Gourmont. Lindberg describes Pound's critical writings as relentlessly unsystematic and shows how Pound saw high culture as a system in which the influence of writers and artists upon each other is comparable to a system of flowing electric currents. Pound's pedagogy is "revolutionary" in the sense that he continually directed his attention to marginal figures such as Remy de Gourmont, opposing the traditionalist and more conventional critical approach of T.S. Eliot. Lindberg concludes her study with a chapter that relates the history of Pound's critical writings to the more contemporary thought of Gilles Deleuze and Félix Guattari, in which their rhizomatic theory of culture sets forth a vision of artistic creation and influence that resembles a system of tendrils and roots rather than a trees and branches.

== Reception ==
Reading Pound Reading was widely and positively reviewed in the academic press.

Cordell D. K. Yee, reviewing the book for the journal American Literature, stated that Reading Pound Reading "aims to unsettle critical orthodoxy.... By identifying affinities between Pound and Nietzsche, Lindberg seeks to undermine widely accepted views of early twentieth-century literary history." While praising the book overall, Yee contends that Lindberg's argument may overstate the differences between Eliot and Pound as critics:

[I]t is not entirely clear that the two writers are completely at odds in their critical aims. Eliot is not exactly the creature of orthodoxy that Lindberg's account makes him out to be: Eliot's revaluation of the metaphysical poets and devaluation of Milton did not represent orthodox views at the time they were published. In addition, Pound is not the only one of the two to question the separation of commentary from text: Eliot's addition of notes to The Waste Land is a maneuver that does just that. And Eliot's criticism of past literature, like Pound's, is often meant to provide guides to the reading of his own work.

Ian Bell, writing in the Journal of American Studies lauded the book. "Unusually and refreshingly, Lindberg's subjects are Pound's 'Kulchur' and his modes of reading," Bell wrote. Bell stated,

Lindberg has produced a major study both of Pound and modernism, a study that is productively 'after' Nietzsche (the pun is hers, and is properly deployed), and is certainly one of the best graphs of the Nietzschean filter we have. Here is exciting reading which, if occasionally given to unnecessary weightiness, forcefully obliges us to re-think our patterns of consuming texts. Lindberg's wish to avoid, in the main, 'the Poundians' is part of a necessary project to redeem Pound (and modernism) from what has so often been a debate that formalizes, dehistoricizes, and anaesthetizes its subject.

George Kearns reviewed the book for Paideuma. Kearns wrote that Lindberg "has now given us the finest study of Pound to date employing modes of reading informed by post-structuralist thought, in particular deconstruction.... Reading Pound Reading is an important contribution to Pound criticism, a book rich in its suggestions, its surprising angles of vision, and its productive close-readings of Pound's prose texts." Kearns went on to say:

Even readers inclined to resist Lindberg's emphasis on Pound's radically disruptive and heteroclite procedures and upon places where he “seems to announce the mutual undoing of the critical and poetic texts from which his own text is hardly immune," will find themselves challenged and richly instructed by her study. It stands as a useful, even polemical, corrective to both pre- and post-structuralist reductive readings.

Martin Melaver, reviewing Reading Pound Reading for Poetics Today, described the book as follows:

For Lindberg, it is precisely the poet-critic's lack of system—his disdain for copyright laws; his marginal commentaries; his use of tropes such as punning, cliche, and folk etymology to counter abstract thought; his manipulation of wide-ranging references and heterogeneous catalogs to inhibit generalization and hinder the recognition of simple facts, his efforts to break down generic distinctions; his fragmented borrowings, free translations, and misreadings; his destabilizing use of metaphor—that locates Pound within a modernist coterie, all of whose reading practices challenge and disrupt basic assumptions about a cultural tradition.

Bruce Clarke, writing in South Atlantic Review, found Reading Pound Reading to be "another reminder that many canonical modernists are most powerfully attended to at their margins, not in their stories and poems but in their 'nonfictions,' in the rhetorics of their 'doctrinal' discourses." Clarke describes Lindberg's study as one that

deposits [Pound] with pen and paper in the rhetorical study, reading and writing transgressively. Pound the literary/political performance artist attempting to dominate historical events; Pound the deconstructive writer/ critic anarchistically disrupting textual forms. We are beginning to appreciate just how completely these two Pound-personae are allotropic forms of the same ego-phenomenon, how this turbulent ego-phenomenon is a modernist Medusa—when we hold up the mirror to aim the spear, our own evasive faces are reflected in the glass.

== See also ==
- Friedrich Nietzsche
- Remy de Gourmont
- T. S. Eliot
- Leo Frobenius
- Jacob Burckhardt

== Sources ==
- Bell, Ian (April 1989). "Review of Reading Pound Reading: Modernism After Nietzsche". Journal of American Studies. 23 (1). Cambridge University Press on behalf of the British Association for American Studies: 144–145. doi:10.1017/S0021875800019629. JSTOR 27555137.
- Clarke, Bruce (September 1989). "Review of Reading Pound Reading: Modernism after Nietzsche by Kathryne V. Lindberg; Ezra Pound: The Legacy of Kulchur by Marcel Smith and William A. Ulmer". South Atlantic Review. 54 (3): 147–150. doi:10.2307/3200205. JSTOR 3200205.
- Kearns, George (Spring–Fall 1990). "Review of Reading Pound Reading: Modernism After Nietzsche by Kathryne V. Lindberg". Paideuma: Modern and Contemporary Poetry and Poetics. 19 (1/2). National Poetry Foundation: 241–245. JSTOR 24724082.
- Lindberg, Kathryne V. (1987). Reading Pound Reading: Modernism After Nietzsche. Oxford: Oxford University Press.
- Melaver, Martin (Winter 1989). "Review of Reading Pound Reading: Modernism After Nietzsche by Kathryne V. Lindberg". Poetics Today. 10 (4): 856. doi:10.2307/1772818. JSTOR 1772818.
- Yee, Cordell D. K. (October 1988). "Review of Ezra Pound: The Solitary Volcano, by John Tytell; Ezra Pound and Japan: Letters and Essays, by Sanehide Kodama; Reading Pound Reading: Modernism after Nietzsche, by Kathryne V. Lindberg". American Literature. 60 (3): 501–505. doi:10.2307/2926982. JSTOR 2926982.
