= Synolos =

British social enterprise

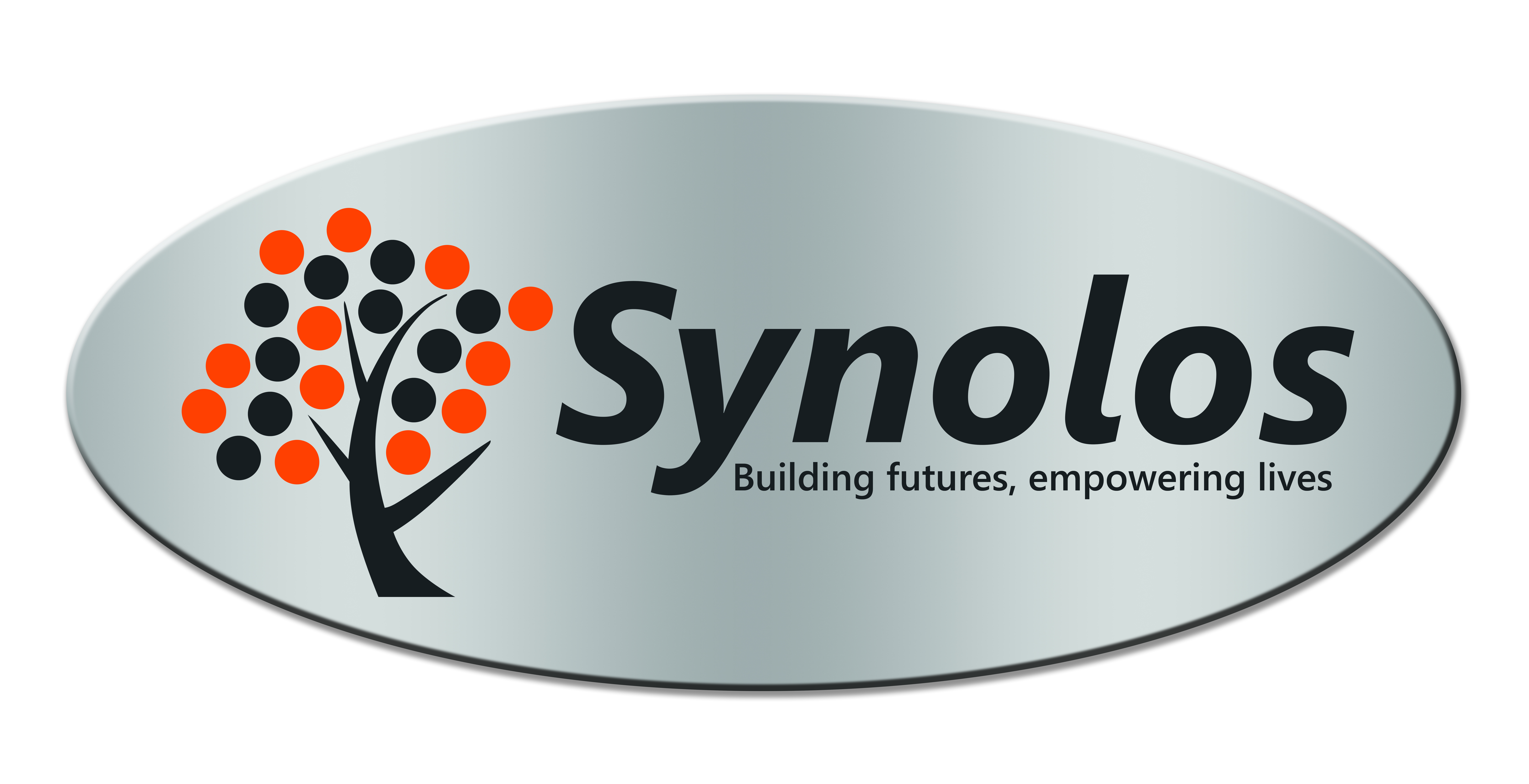
The Logo of Synolos

Synolos is a Social Enterprise (CIC) organisation based in Witney, West Oxfordshire, founded by Barry Ingleton in 2010 which helps individuals to improve their lives and build the future that they aspire to.

Synolos has three different programs: D1 (outreach to people at their homes), D2 (a social group) and D3 (education). The name Synolos derives from the Greek word synergos (συνεργός) which means "working together". Synolos's mascot is a robot character called "Rusty". He is on many of Synolos's official merchandise. Synolos sells a range of items from second-hand books to novelty items and 3D models. Synolos has numerous different items for service users to use including two 3D printers, a T-shirt printing machine, a printer, multiple gaming computers, two Nintendo switches, a wood workshop, tools, a pool table, a gym with punching bag and weights, a drawable whiteboard and a television.
