= Bazoches-au-Houlme =

- Commune
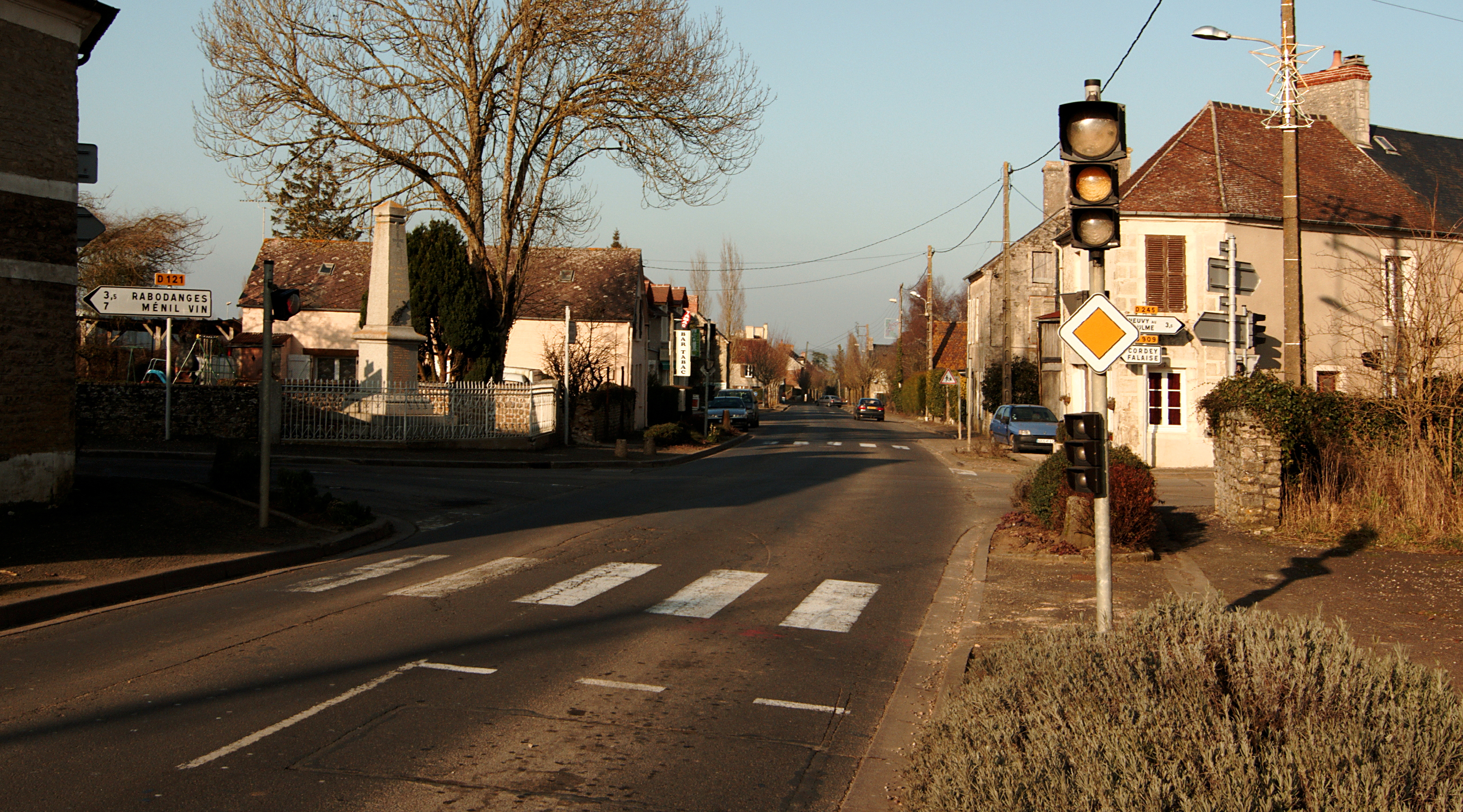
- A view within Bazoches-au-Houlme
- Location of Bazoches-au-Houlme
- Location within France Location within Normandy
- Coordinates: 48°49′06″N 0°14′22″W
- Country: France
- Region: Normandy
- Department: Orne
- Arrondissement: Argentan
- Canton: Athis-Val de Rouvre
- Intercommunality: Val d'Orne

Government
  - Mayor (2020–2026): Alix Dauger
- Area^{1}: 28.64 km^{2} (11.06 sq mi)
- Elevation: 183 m (600 ft)
- Highest elevation: 230 m (750 ft)
- Lowest elevation: 90 m (300 ft)
- Population (2023): 449
  - Density: 15.7/km^{2} (40.6/sq mi)
- Time zone: UTC+01:00 (CET)
  - Summer (DST): UTC+02:00 (CEST)
- INSEE/Postal code: 61028 /61210
- ^{1} French Land Register data, which excludes lakes, ponds, glaciers > 1 km^{2} (0.386 sq mi or 247 acres) and river estuaries.

Bazoches-au-Houlme (French pronunciation: [bazɔʃ o ulm]) is a commune in the Orne department in northwestern France.

== Toponymy ==
The etymology of the name is probably a blend of Latin and Old Norse origins: Basilicis ("church"; attested 11th c.) and holmr ("islet, meadow, etc.").

== Geography ==
The commune of Bazoches-au-Houlme is part of the area known as Suisse Normande.

The commune is made up of the following collection of villages and hamlets, Bazoches-au-Houlme, La Guilberdière, Le Pont de Baize and La Thiboudière. The commune is spread over an area of 28.64 square kilometres (7,080 acres) with a maximum altitude of 230 metres (754 ft 7 in) and minimum of 90 metres (295 ft 3 in)

The river Baize runs through the commune, along with four of its tributaries, Ruisseau des Vaux Viets, Ruisseau du Val Lienard, Ruisseau du Val and Ruisseau des Vallees.

=== Land distribution ===
The 2018 CORINE Land Cover assessment shows the vast majority of the land in the commune, 56% (1,607 hectares (3,970 acres)) is Arable land. The rest of the land is meadows at 37%, forests are 4% and rest of land is equally shared by heterogeneous agricultural, artificial, non-agricultural green spaces and urbanised areas.

== Notable buildings and places ==
=== National heritage sites ===
- Saint-Pierre Church is a church built during the 12th century that contains a group of sculptures of The Virgin Bringing Communion to Saint Avoie, from the old church of Saint-Pavin is classed as a Monument historique.
- Château de Bazoches-au-Houlme is a stately home built in many stages. At first it was castle fortress remnants from the 12th century that was partly destroyed by Geoffrey Plantagenet with a watchtower that was built in the 14th century added to the structure. Later in the 15th to 18th century a stately home was added to the structure. This is classed as a Monument historique.
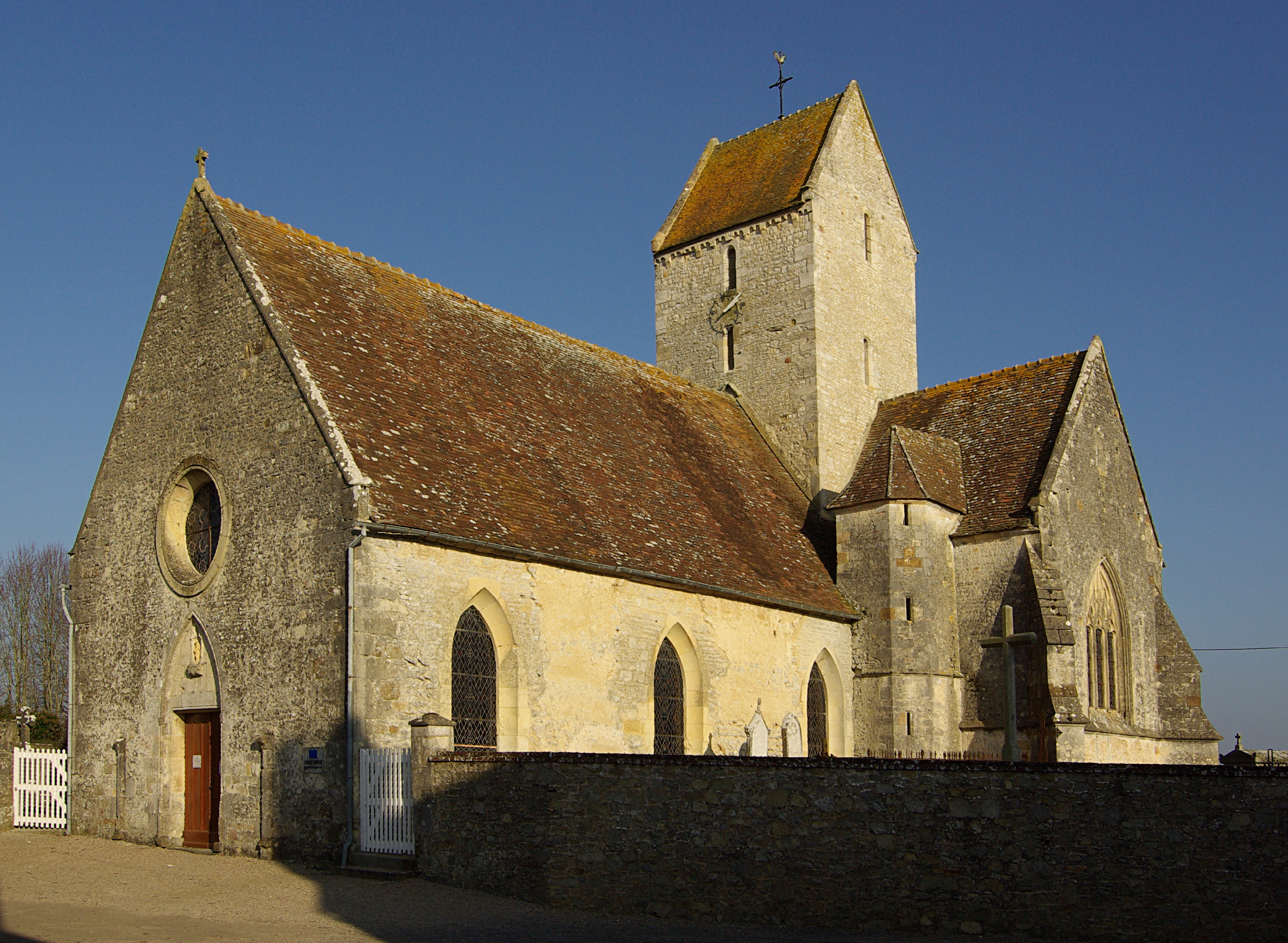
Saint-Pierre Church

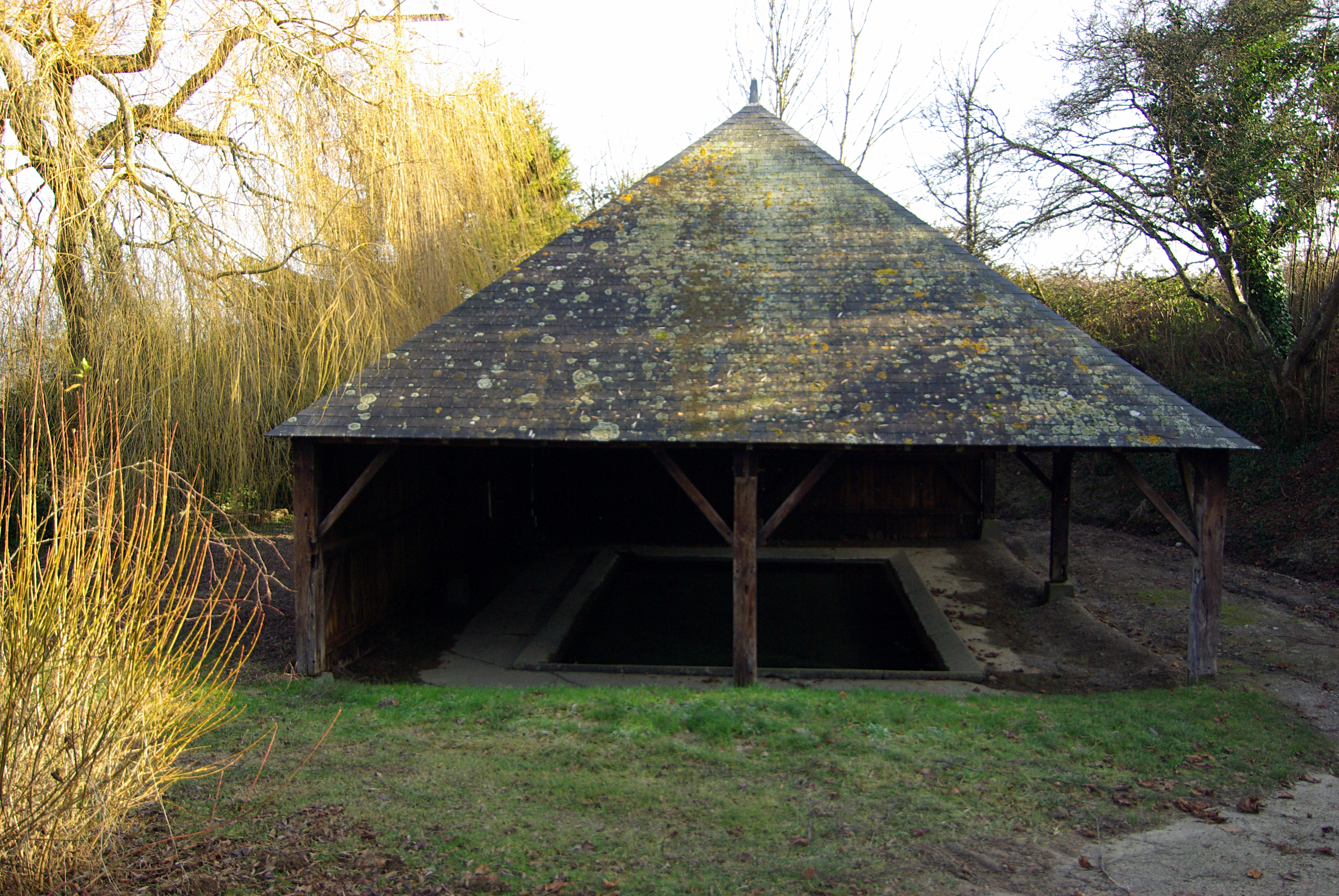
Bazoches-au-Houlme lavoir

== Notable people ==
- Remy de Gourmont, a French symbolist poet, novelist, and influential critic, was born in Bazoches-au-Houlme.
- Maurice Ephrussi, owned the Haras du Gazon, a breeding farm in Bazoches-au-Houlme which produced several horses of notable ability.

== Population ==
Historical population
Year	Pop.	±% p.a.
1968	442	—
1975	386	−1.92%
1982	332	−2.13%
1990	335	+0.11%
1999	334	−0.03%
2007	412	+2.66%
2012	497	+3.82%
2017	468	−1.20%
2023	449	−0.69%
Source: INSEE

== See also ==
- Communes of the Orne department
