= Caesar Antichrist =

1895 play by Alfred Jarry

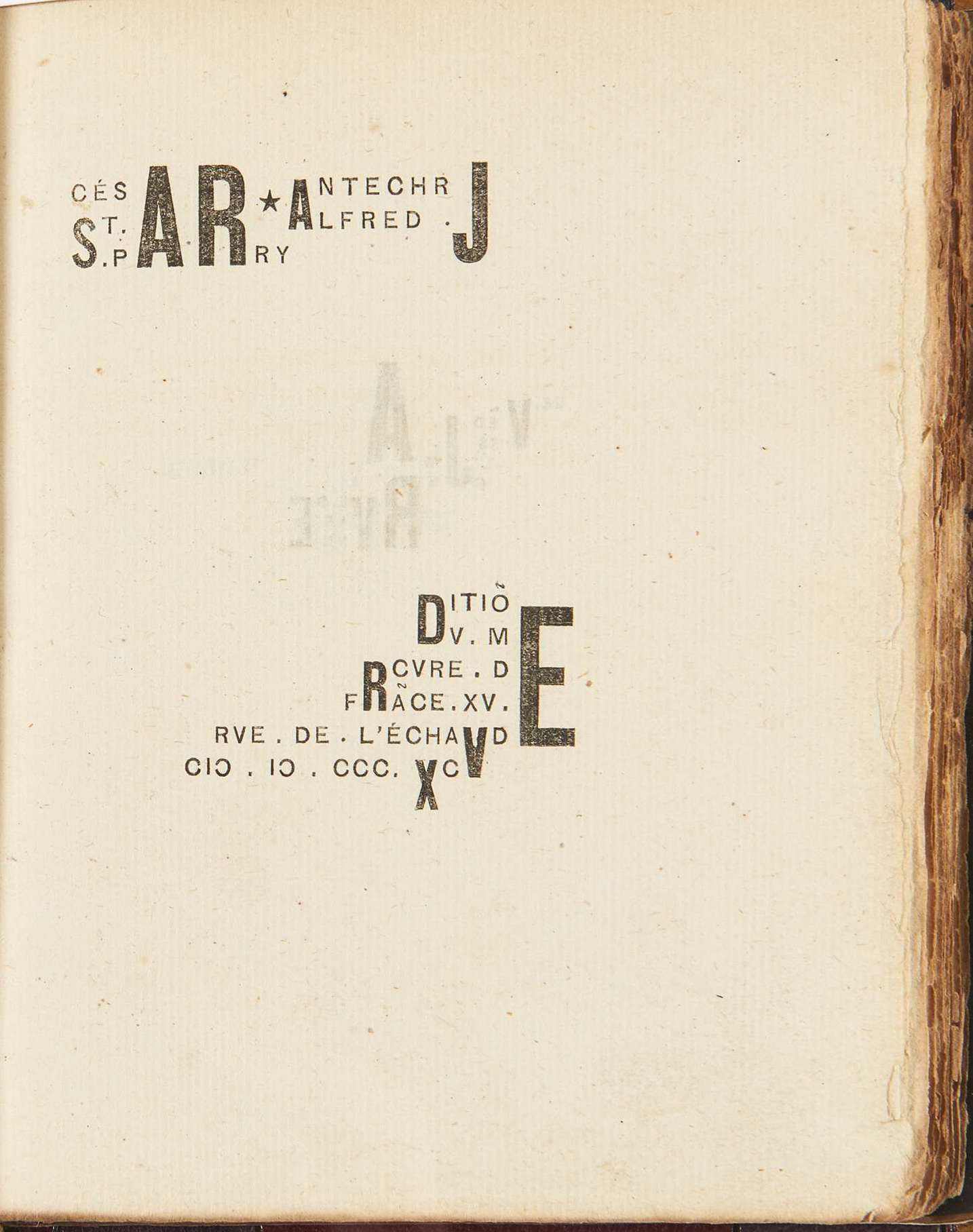
- Title page to the 1985 edition of César Antéchrist
- Written by: Alfred Jarry
- Original language: French

Caesar Antichrist (French: César-Antéchrist) is a play by the French writer Alfred Jarry, published in 1895. The third act is an early version of Jarry's next play, Ubu Roi; the main character of which, Père Ubu, appears here as the Antichrist. The play begins with a startling sequence of images of garbled Christianity from which Ubu emerges as the new Messiah. Scholar Kimberly Jannarone argues the play was 'not intended for the stage' and is Jarry's own form of 'the theatre of the book'. While not a closet drama, Jannarone argues this might be its closest lineage, and can be considered within a tradition of works ranging from the 'Platonic dialogues and Senecan tragedies through Milton’s Samson Agonistes, Byron’s Manfred, and Villiers de l’Isle-Adam’s Axel'.

== Production history ==
The play was not produced in Jarry's lifetime, and as Jannarone notes, 'almost no one attempts to stage it.' The Australian Live Performance Database lists a performance at Rusden State College in Melbourne, from 10–12 November 1978, which was performed by students in the first-year undergraduate course Drama-110. The world premiere of James Bierman’s original translation (revised by the translator) took place at the University of California Santa Cruz in March 2005. The Santa Cruz Sentinel noted, "Caesar Antichrist is both a strange and unusual play and a riotous and ribald production. It's not a show that is likely to be produced again (ever, anywhere), so if you want to experience patapyhsical apocalyptic theatre, this is probably your only chance'.

== See also ==
- 1895 in literature
- 19th-century French literature
