= Franz Marijnen =

Belgian theatre director (1943–2022)

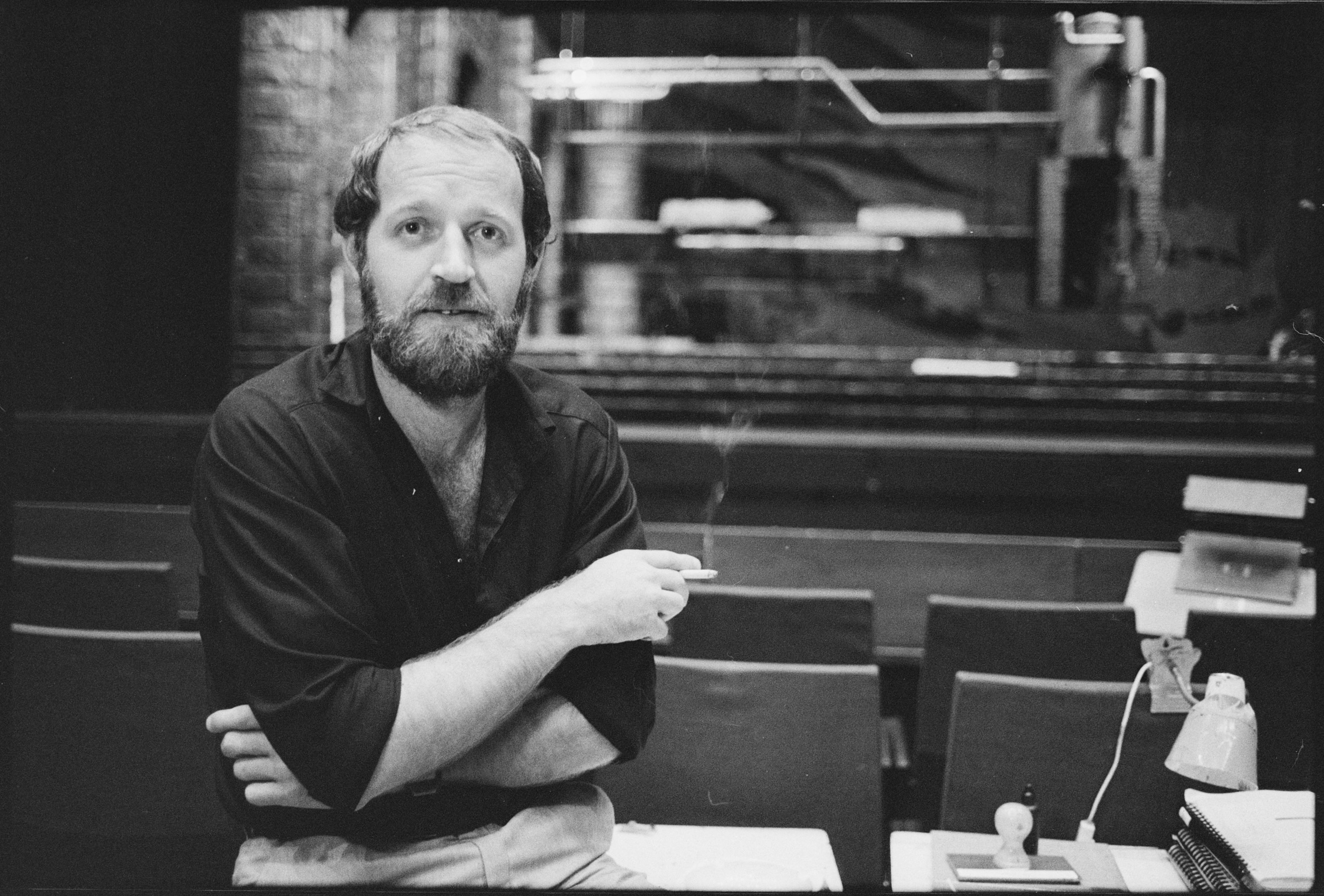
Franz Marijnen at The Hague Opera, 1979

Franz Marijnen (4 April 1943 – 3 August 2022) was a Belgian theatre director. His early career, in the Netherlands and Belgium, was influenced by the work of the Polish theatre director and theorist Jerzy Grotowski. Marijnen then moved to the United States where he founded the experimental theatre company Camera Obscura. By the latter half of the 1970s, he was again working primarily in Europe. He served as artistic director of several large theatres in the Netherlands and Belgium, including the Ro Theatre in Rotterdam and the KVS in Brussels.

== Life and career ==
Marijnen was born in Mechelen on 4 April 1943. He studied directing at the Royal Institute for Theatre, Cinema & Sound (RITCS) in Brussels. Marijnen began directing for the Mechels Miniatuur Teater while a student at RITCS, and in 1966 directed a production of Edward Albee's The Zoo Story that received positive reviews.

In 1966, Marijnen met Polish theatre director and theorist Jerzy Grotowski at a workshop in Brussels. In 1967, Marijnen went to Poland for an internship at Grotowski's Laboratory Theatre in Opole. He was inspired by Grotowski's method, which focused on the actor's physical presence on the stage. Marijnen wrote and published a report about Grotowski's workshop in the theatre magazine Windroos. The report was later reprinted in Grotowski's 1968 book Towards a Poor Theatre.

Marijnen tried to apply Grotowski's method upon his return to Belgium, in 1969. He taught workshops at multiple Flemish and Dutch theatre companies, including the Nederlandse Komedie in Amsterdam, and found that classically trained actors were not open to the method.

In 1971, Marijnen moved to the United States, looking for a more receptive environment to teach and apply Grotowski's method. He had several teaching appointments while in the United States, including at the Carnegie Mellon School of Drama. In 1973, he founded his own theatre company, Camera Obscura, which was based in Jamestown, New York. He directed multiple productions at La MaMa Experimental Theatre Club in New York City during the early 1970s, including Fernando Arrabal's Fando and Lis (1971), Camera Obscura in Andy Wolk's Oracles (1973), Camera Obscura in Wolk's adaptation of Comte de Lautreamont's Maldoror (1974), and Camera Obscura in Shakespeare's Measure for Measure (1974). Camera Obscura went on tour in Europe in 1973, 1974, and 1975.

He returned to Europe in 1977 to become the first director of the Ro Theatre in Rotterdam. As a freelance director at other theatres, he produced large-scale productions such as Wasteland (Rotterdam, 1980) and Bataille Bataille (Groningen, 1992). He continued using Grotowski's method, and was one of the few directors who successfully produced large-scale productions that were experimental.

In 1993, Marijnen became the director of the KVS in Brussels where he produced classical pieces such as King Lear (1987) and Oedipus / In Kolonos (1994). He brought audiences from French-speaking Brussels and endeavoured to give Arab culture a place in the theatre. He resigned in 2000 after seven years as director, partially due to financial issues the theatre was experiencing.

He then joined the National Theatre in The Hague to direct productions such as Glenn Gould (2008) and Pier Paolo Pasolini – PPP (2010). Since 2012, he was directing in Mechelen at Arsenaal, the former Mechels Miniatuur Teater, where he started his career. In early 2014, he produced Scarlatti with an international cast.

== Selected works ==
1966
The Zoo Story, Edward Albee – Mechels Miniatuur Teater
1968
Saved, Edward Bond – Mechels Miniature Teater
1970
Learn about Leather / Measure for Measure, William Shakespeare – Dutch Comedy
1973
Oracles, with Andy Wolk (after Sophocles' Oedipus) – Camera Obscura
Yerma, Federico García Lorca - Nederlands Toneel Gent (NTGent)
1975
Grimm! (collaborative project about the Brothers Grimm – Schauspielhaus Hamburg
1980
Wasteland (Simon Rozendaal Ensemble) – Ro Theater in collaboration with Werkcentrum Dans
De Meiden, Jean Genet – Ro Theater
1983
Aida, Giuseppe Verdi – Royal Ballet of Flanders, Antwerp Orchestra, and Flanders Opera
1984
Jules Verne, Rob Scholten and Marijnen – Ro Theater, Stichting Noordelijk Theater de Voorziening
Exit the King, Eugène Ionesco – NTGent
1985
I Jan Cremer, Lennaert Nijgh (after Jan Cremer) – Ro Theater
1987
Doktor Faust, libretto by Ferruccio Busoni – Dutch Opera Foundation
King Lear, William Shakespeare – NTGent
1988
Woyzeck, Georg Büchner – The National Theater
1989
Orgy, Pier Paolo Pasolini – The Southern Theater
1991
Endgame, Samuel Beckett – Royal Flemish Theater
1992
Waiting for Godot, Samuel Beckett – The National Theater
Bataille / bataille, Georges Bataille – North Dutch Theater
1993
King Lear, William Shakespeare – Royal Flemish Theater
1994
Oedipus, Hugo Claus (to Seneca) – Royal Flemish Theater
In Kolonos, Hugo Claus (after Sophocles) – Royal Flemish Theater
1996
Oresteia, Aeschylus – Royal Flemish Theater
2000
Winter, Jon Fosse – The Arsenal
2008
Red Rubber Balls, Peter Verhelst – The National Theater
Glenn Gould, Marijnen – The National Theater
2010
Pier Paolo Pasolini – PPP, Marijnen – The National Theater
2011
The Threepenny Opera, Bertolt Brecht with music by Kurt Weill – The National Theater
2014
Scarlatti, Marijnen – The Arsenal
