= Exploits and Opinions of Dr. Faustroll, Pataphysician =

Novel by Alfred Jarry

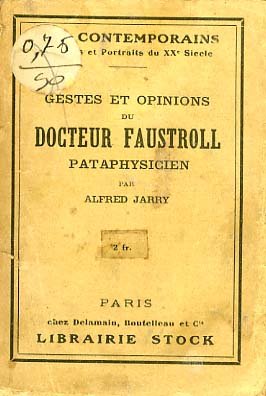
Frontpage. Faustroll

Exploits and Opinions of Dr. Faustroll, Pataphysician (original title in French: Gestes et opinions du docteur Faustroll pataphysicien : Roman néo-scientifique suivi de Spéculations) is a novel by the French author Alfred Jarry. It features Doctor Faustroll (an allusion to Doctor Faustus), a scientist who is born in 1898 in Circassia at the age of 63, and who dies the same year at the same age.

Written in 1898, the novel was first published posthumously in 1911 by Fasquelle. It was published in paperback in 2007 by Arléa (Arléa-Poche) on the centenary of Jarry's death.

== Plot ==
One of Jarry's 'pataphysical works, the novel relates the adventures of Dr. Faustroll and his companion, a lawyer named Panmuphle, on their travels in a copper skiff on a sea that is superimposed over the streets and buildings of Paris. Written in the first person by Panmuphle, the narrative describes the fantastic islands that they visit. The pair are accompanied by a monkey named Bosse-de-Nage, who perishes along the way, leaving Panmuphle wondering if he had imagined him or whether he had been real.

At the end of the novel Dr. Faustroll dies, and he sends a telepathic letter to Lord Kelvin describing the afterlife and the cosmos. The symbolism of the novel has imagination and language overriding the reality of the French capital, and the story is wryly comic and surrealistic in nature. The novel concludes with the line (in italics): "La 'Pataphysique est la science..."

== Publication ==
Jarry wrote of the novel: "This book will not be published in full until the author has acquired enough experience to savour all its beauties". ("Ce livre ne sera publié intégralement que quand l'auteur aura acquis assez d'experience pour en savourer toutes les beautés".) It was published in 1911, after Jarry's death in 1907.

== Influence ==
Via influence from dadaist literature, the musician Gregory Scharpen, as part of his Thomas Carnacki project, released the Oar of Panmuphle album with the title referencing Exploits and Opinions of Dr. Faustroll, Pataphysician. The blackgaze band Bosse-de-Nage, which takes much of its lyrical inspiration from literary surrealism, is named after the monkey from this book.
