= Zinzolin =

Shade of red, or reddish purple

Zinzolin or gingeolin is an old or literary color name that means a reddish purple color. It is often used to describe clothing.

== Origin ==
The word comes from the Italian zuzzulino and Arabic djoudjolân "sesame seed" as zizolin (1599, 1617), or the Spanish cinzolino and Italian giuggiolena, hence the term gingeolin, because you can get a stain from this seed. This explanation goes back to Gilles Ménage, who also mentions a Latin derivation of zinzolin from hysiginium, a plant mentioned by Pliny, and its diminutive hysiginolinum. This etymology has not always been popular, since Michel Eugène Chevreul says "Ginjolin (or gingeolin): color of dried jujube fruit (Zizyphus officinalis), formerly known as gingeole". The Italian and French Dictionary of 1663 indeed pairs the Italian giuggiolino (jujube) with Zinzolin. The Littré says "purple dye", without indicating a source.

In 1650 Paul Scarron speaks of it as a color long gone out of fashion, which probably explains the uncertainties as to its meaning.

The word, from the jargon surrounding tapestry, was used in burlesques in the seventeenth century and in the eighteenth century, with a 1769 pamphlet, still known and criticised by Diderot. Antoine de Rivarol used the word for satirical purposes. Max Jacob was able to use zinzolin many times in his novel The Bouchaballe land (1923), without giving any indication of the color or fabric in question, while providing a supremely fanciful etymology.

== Color ==
=== Red-purple ===
Gingeolin, a reddish color, was used in 1635 Zinzolin in 1599 was unambiguously described in ’Harmonie universelle by Marin Mersenne (1636) as the final color of prismatic light on the red end of the spectrum. The Dictionnaire du tapissier (Weaver's Dictionary) defined zizzolin or zinzolin as a purple garance (rose madder), going back to the inventory of Gabrielle d'Estrées.

Sesame-based dye, used in India, gives a reddish-brown color. In 1615, the zinzolin of the livery worn by Concino Concini's men was compared to the color of blood.

=== Red-orange ===
Sixty years later, however, the officials of the reign of Louis XIV wrote in a réglement (rule, regulation): "oranges, buckskin color, aurore (color) (dawn), gingeolins, golden yellow, tile and chamois color and onion peel, will be tinted according to their hue with weld (Reseda luteola) and rose madder. Same list by Antoine Furetière (1701), can only indicate a yellowish orange.

In the 19th century, Michel-Eugène Chevreul undertook a classification, both comparative and with respect to Fraunhofer lines. He categorized ginjolin (or gingeolin), a color of the Instruction générale pour la teinture of 1671 obtained with rose madder and similar to the color of tile, as in red-orange 4 tone 15.

=== Maybe not yellow, grey, or blue ===
In 1765 a new method for making a gingeolin orpiment made it yellower. But this translation from Italian mentions a clear yellow terre or earth, which in no way resembles gingeolin, and also mentions gingeolin de Naples. The work probably rendered giallorino (golden yellow or Naples yellow) with gingeolin. This may have been a translation error, since the term gingeolin was already obsolete, or a transcription of a local usage. Dauphiné and Provence were close to and had commercial ties with Italy, and in 1809, the Dictionaire des patois de l'Isère (Dictionary of the Dialects of the Isère) defined zinzolin or gingeolin as a color approaching a clear yellow. The patois of the Isère could have in this way adopted or adapted an Italian usage.

En 1911 a satirical work mentioned "the taste for pale upholstery fabrics, lemon yellows, pistachio greens, zinzolin greys, evanescent pinks", and in 2002 there is a reference to zinzolin blue (Amzallag-Augé 2002).

=== Purple in modern classifications ===
In recent color charts, the color zinzolin is a mauve or a purple. The shift in meaning, from purplish-red to reddish-purple then simply purple, took place in the second half of the 19th century, all the more easily because the word zinzolin has a pleasant sound, but remained rare, literary, pretentious and even bizarre. No doubt this should be seen in the context of the invention of artificial coloring and the fashion for purples in the 1860s.

==== Other modern uses ====
- In embroidery thread: zinzolin 1122 or 2704 Zinzolin Purple
- In buildings: T03 Zinzolin
- In colored concrete: Zinzolin 271
- In nail polish: Pale Zinzolin Purple

== Bibliography ==
Monographs

- Amzallag-Augé, Élizabeth (2002), Bleu zinzolin et autres bleus : un parcours en zigzag dans les collections du Centre Pompidou [Zinzolin Blue and Other Blues: A Zigzag Path through the Collections of the Centre Pompidou], Paris: Centre Pompidou, ISBN 2844261477

Chapters

- Rémy de Gourmont, Zinzolin , in "Couleurs", 1915 (online)

Articles

- Durand Guiziou, Marie-Claire (2002). "Le zinzolin, le zinzoline et la zinzolinette, étude du motif de l'étoffe dans Le terrain Bouchaballe de Max Jacob" [Zinzolin, Zinzoline and Zinzolinette, Study of the Fabric Motif in Le terrain Bouchaballe by Max Jacob]. EPOS: Revista de filología.
- Durand Guiziou, Marie-Claire (2004). "La symbolique des nombres trois, sept, douze et la valeur graphique du zinzolin dans Le terrain Bouchaballe de Max Jacob" [The Symbolism of the numbers three, seven, twelve, and the graphic value of Zinzolin in Le terrain Bouchaballe by Max Jacob]. EPOS: Revista de filología (20–21): 171. doi:10.5944/epos.20-21.2004.10471. hdl:10553/1422.

== See also ==
- Garance (pigment)
