= Supermale (novel) =

1902 novel by Alfred Jarry

Supermale (French: Le Surmâle, roman moderne) is a 1902 novel by French author Alfred Jarry. Its irreverent, darkly-humorous storyline contains elements of science fiction. The novel, Jarry's last, revolves around a race between a train and a team of cyclists fuelled by perpetual-motion food and the exploits of a "supermale" capable of prodigious feats of endurance and sexual athleticism. Supermale was translated into English by Barbara Wright in 1968.

== Plot ==
A large part of the novel takes place on Andre Marcueil's estate, Chateau de Lurance. It is set in the 1920s, the near future, when it was written.

During a dinner party at the mansion of Andre Marcueil, the main character, several guests discuss the nature of love. Arthur Gough, William Elson, Dr. Bathybius, and the host propose four definitions of love. Love is thought to be an emotion; an impression on the soul, an enfeebled sensation, and (which Andre tries to prove) an activity.

The story then flashes back to Andre’s childhood, introducing the idea of the Supermale. Andre, a sexually repressed 12-year-old, is confused about his body. He begins taking bromide and exercising to become super-strong.

Back at the dinner party, the discussion becomes earthier with the women absent. The men begin speculating about how many times a person can have sex in one day, and Andre tries to demonstrate his strength by breaking a dynamometer.

As the dinner party ends, Andre and Ellen have a sexual conversation and she admires the roses on his property. As soon as she leaves, he orders his servant to cut them down.

The story switches to the 10,000-mile race. A five-person bicycle is racing a train full of spectators, including Ellen. Perpetual-motion food is giving them the strength and stamina to keep up with the train. One of the cyclists dies, but the bicycle speeds up. The cyclists notice a mysterious shadow in the background, which passes them. They finish a day and a half ahead of schedule but instead of finding cheering fans, they find roses at the finish line.

At another dinner party at Andre’s mansion, the police appear and announce that they have found a girl who was raped and murdered on the estate; the matter is taken very lightly. Andre, trying to see how many times the girl can endure sex with him, is the culprit; this dents his heroic reputation.

Seven prostitutes begin to roam the mansion, and find themselves in a room. They hear mysterious footsteps, and assume that an "Indian" is coming for them. Trapped in the room for hours, they begin eating their cosmetics.

Bathybius, in the study, returns to his notes to find something unusual he had written, and considers the potential of God compared to man. The "Indian" (Andre) meets a disguised Ellen. Ellen tells Andre that she had locked the seven prostitutes in a room. They begin an experiment, with Bathybius observing and keeping count in a nearby room, and set a new record of 82 episodes of lovemaking (breaking the old record of 70).

During one of their breaks, Ellen falls asleep and Bathybius enters the room. Andre (as the Indian) greets him with "Who art thou, human creature?" The gallery is filled with people.

The Indian is carried to where the people are, and they speculate that he can revive them by producing offspring with supreme qualities. However, the Indian says that he is sterile (much to their dismay). He returns to the room where Ellen is sleeping.

The prostitutes break the window in their room, causing a commotion to get Andre’s attention. Irritated, he drowns them out with a phonograph. They continue, while Bathybius observes them from another room.

Andre realizes that his theory about love was wrong; sex does not equal love, since he has not fallen in love with Ellen. After he sees Ellen apparently dead (although she is asleep, he writes a poem for her about Helen of Troy and the carnage she caused). He falls into a deep sleep, murmuring "I adore her".

Andre is revealed as the Indian, and William Elson is convinced that Andre must love Ellen. It is agreed that a love machine (similar to an electric chair) must be built to force Andre to love Ellen. While Andre is still faint from the sex marathon, he is strapped to the love machine. He awakens when 11,000 volts are sent through his body, causing him to break free of his chair and try to escape, but he dies. Over time, Ellen eventually gets over Andre, and marries a man who can keep his love within human capacities.

== Characters ==
- Andre Marcueil - The "Supermale" of the novel, whose exploits are described in third-person narration. At first, Andre seems to be a misunderstood, psychologically scarred man with supernatural abilities. However, after the death of the girl on the Lurance estate he is revealed as callous and inhuman. Throughout the novel, Andre seeks to push human boundaries.
- The Indian - Andre's alter ego, a quiet, handsome, athletic-looking man. When Andre sets out to break the record, he disguises himself as an Indian (complete with tomahawk and makeup).
- Ellen Elson - Andre's love interest, although he does not appreciate her until he thinks she is dead. She breaks the Indian's and Andre's records. Ellen is described as a young American woman of indeterminate age who was a virgin.
- William Elson - An American chemist and Ellen's father, he organizes the 10,000-mile race and is the inventor of perpetual-motion food. William forces Andre to sit in the love machine, leading to Andre's death.
- Arthur Gough - "The millionaire engineer, electrical expert, and manufacturer of automobiles and aircraft", Arthur develops the high-speed train which races the five-man bicycle team in the 10,000-mile race.
- Mrs. Gough - Arthur's wife
- Senator de Saint-Jurieu - An aging aristocrat who attends Andre's dinner party and the later experiment
- Pusice-Euprepie de Saint-Jurieu - The senator's wife
- Cardinal Romuald - A dinner-party guest
- Doctor Bathybius - Andre's adversary, Bathybius' life revolves around medicine and science. When asked about love, he describes it as a biochemical reaction. The doctor dislikes Andre because his strength and stamina are outside the realm of scientific knowledge, which makes Bathybius uncomfortable. He, Arthur (an engineer) and William (a chemist) decide to use a love machine to force Andre to fall in love with Ellen.
- General Sider - A naive, oblivious dinner-party guest and observer of the experiment who is a comic foil to Andre
- Ted Oxborrow - A member of the five-man bicycle team in the 10,000-mile race. The account of the race is from Ted's perspective, in the form of a newspaper article.
- Jewey Jacobs - A member of the bicycle team who dies during the race, apparently from the perpetual-motion food. He continues to race after his death, reportedly performing better than he did when he was alive.
- George Webb and Sammy White - Two other members of the team
- Bill Gilbey - Leader of the team, who is jokingly called "Corporal" by the other members
- Bob Rumble - A little person who rides behind the bicycle team in a trailer, who controls the rear-wheel traction with his weight.
- Mr. Mathieu - The gamekeeper at Lurance, who appears briefly when Andre is questioned by the police
- Henriette Cyne - A well-known actress who is a dinner-party guest and has a snide, childish sense of humor
- Blanche, Adele, Eupure, Herminie, Irene, Modeste, and Virginie - Prostitutes who were physically attracted to the Indian. Hoping to make love to him, he locks them in a room instead. The women engage in an orgy, devouring their makeup. They later escape, and discover Ellen and the Indian having sex.

== Editions ==
- First published by Editions de la Revue Blanche, Paris, in 1902.
- Published in France by Fasquelle in 1945 and by Les Mille Et Une Nuits in 1997.
- In English: The Supermale, A Modern Novel, translated by Barbara Wright and published by Jonathan Cape in 1968.
- In English: The Supermale (translated by Barbara Wright), Exact Change, 1999. ISBN 1-878972-25-1
- In Norwegian: Overhannen, translated by Madeleine Gedde Metz and published by Fashion Moves Literature in 2014.

== See also ==
- 1902 in literature
- 20th-century French literature
