= L'Ymagier =

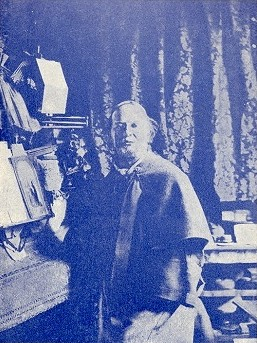
Remy de Gourmont

L'Ymagier, subtitled "A Magazine of Engravings", was a French symbolist art magazine edited by Alfred Jarry and Remy de Gourmont between 1894 and 1895. It ran for five issues and disbanded one year after its first printing, but in that time it published many prints and engravings by influential artists of the time, including Henri Rousseau.

== Beginnings ==
Jarry, a French playwright and artist, and Gourmont, a novelist and poet of the same nationality, had worked in woodcuttings for many years before they joined to form the magazine, although both men were so poor at times that they were forced to experiment with other mediums, such as linoleum and soap for their cuttings. Jarry had also been fascinated with the editorial aspects of publication since he, Francois Coulon and Louis Lormel had collaborated on L’Art Litteraire in 1893–94, which Jarry contributed to and Lormel edited. Jarry and Gourmont founded their own magazine in 1894 with a modest fortune, thus giving them a venue through which they would have complete artistic control over the expression and presentation of both their art and their interests.

=== Symbolism ===
Jarry wrote in L’Ymagier of the power of the direct and archetypal symbol, and set about comparing those symbols, such as the Passion and the Virgin Mary to the deliberately primitive pieces of Paul Gauguin and Émile Bernard, as well as many of his own works. The theme of the universal, primitive, and often childish forces at work in art and society was one that both Jarry and Gourmont would revisit often in their own writing and artwork, particularly in Jarry's most famous play "Ubu Roi." The two also attempted to impress in their magazine the rejection of an optical reality, and instead tried to return art to a place of cult and ritual, hence the heavy religious imagery which peppered several of the issues.

== Publication ==
The first issue was published in October 1894, and was entitled "The Passion" as it contained many woodcuttings depicting the Passion of Christ. It was filled with elaborate and striking religious imagery, yet it was followed shortly by the shockingly graphic and unusual issue "Monsters" in January 1895. Following that was an issue in April 1895 entitled "The Virgin and Christ Child" and then a revisiting of "The Passion" in July of the same year. The final issue, published in October 1895 was the most sparse of all. It was entitled "Gingerbread Figures" and contained only five pictures, four published under the name Alain Jans, Jarry's nom-de-plume, and one which was unsigned. Shortly after this issue Jarry and Gourmont separated and the magazine quietly died out.

=== Contributors ===
Aside from Jarry and Gourmont, L'Ymagier published engravings from Gauguin, Bernard, Francois Georgin, a renowned woodcutter of the day, and Henri Rousseau who developed the status of cult artist due to his work in the magazine and was consistently one of its most popular contributors.

== Afterwards ==
Following his father's death in 1895 Jarry used his inheritance to found Perhinderion, a journal whose title is a Breton word for pilgrimage. The journal was dedicated to juxtaposing conflicting elements often seen separately in art, such as intellectuality and naiveté, as well as presenting the complete works of Albrecht Dürer, a 15th-century painter and printmaker from Germany. Special attention was paid to Dürer's Saint Catherine which is highly symbolist in the way it moves between the formal and the hallucinatory. Jarry declared in the first issue of Perhinderion that the reproductions of the woodcuts would be photoengraved ... without reducing their size, and struck ... on laid paper, which is the most similar to the original paper." This, along with the lavish format, led production costs to be so high that publication was discontinued after only two issues. Though short lived, Jarry and Gourmont's work in L’Ymagier and the magazine's highly symbolist style influenced many artists and writers of the early 20th century, notably Pablo Picasso and Max Jacob, who would build on Jarry and Gourmont's work in symbolism through Surrealism and Dadaism in the 1900s.
