= Alfred Jarry =

French symbolist writer (1873–1907)

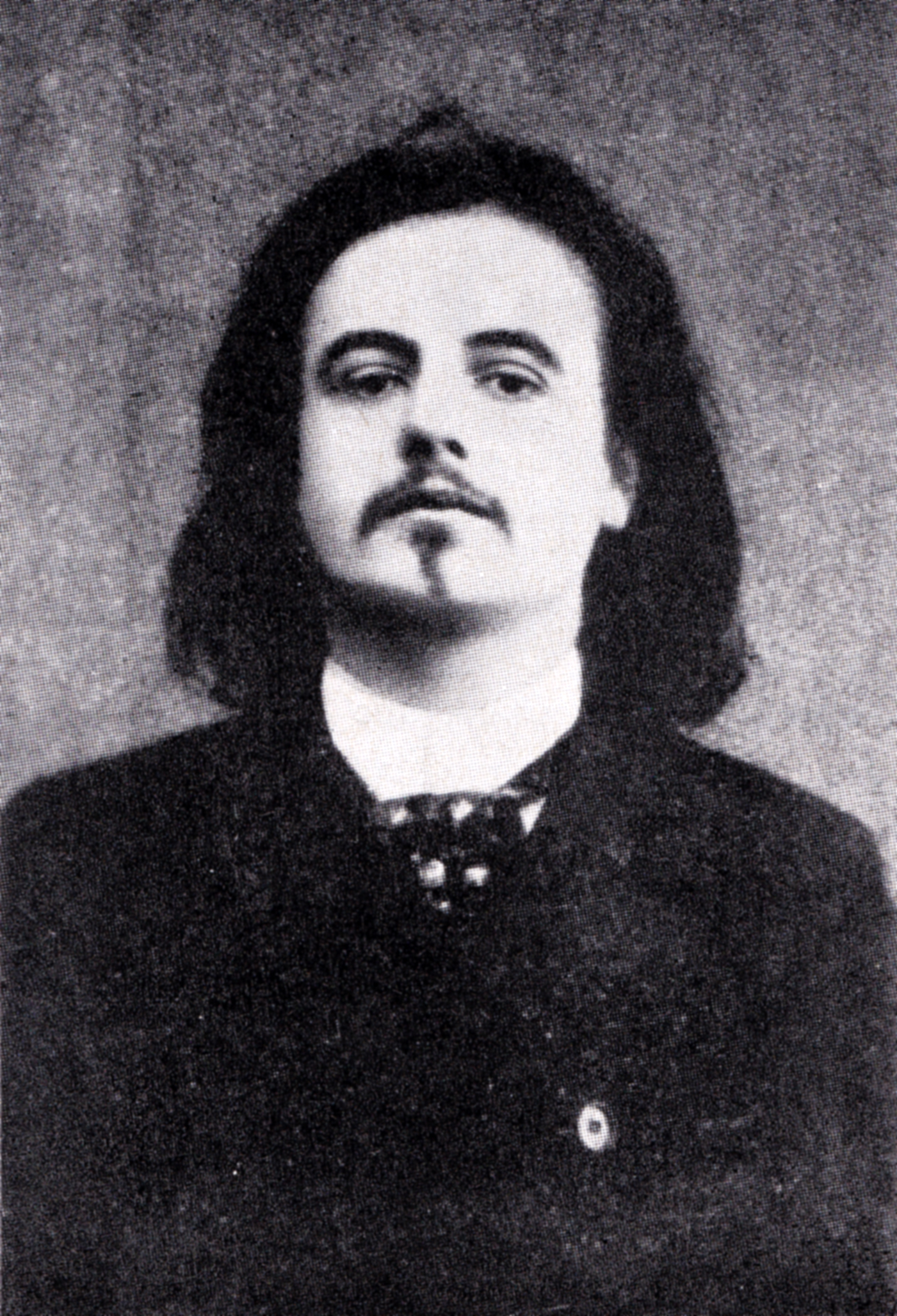
- Jarry in 1896
- Born: 8 September 1873; Laval, France
- Died: 1 November 1907 (aged 34); Paris, France
- Occupations: Writer and dramatist
- Writing career
- Genre: 'Pataphysics

Alfred Jarry (French: [alfʁɛd ʒaʁi]; 8 September 1873 – 1 November 1907) was a French symbolist writer who is best known for his play Ubu Roi (1896), often cited as a forerunner of the Dada, Surrealist, and Futurist movements of the 1920s and 1930s and later the theatre of the absurd in the 1950s and 1960s. He also coined the term and philosophical concept of 'pataphysics.

Jarry was born in Laval, Mayenne, France, although his mother was from Brittany. He wrote in a variety of hybrid genres and styles, prefiguring the postmodern, including novels, poems, short plays and opéras bouffes, absurdist essays and speculative journalism. His texts are considered examples of absurdist literature and postmodern philosophy.

== Biography and works ==
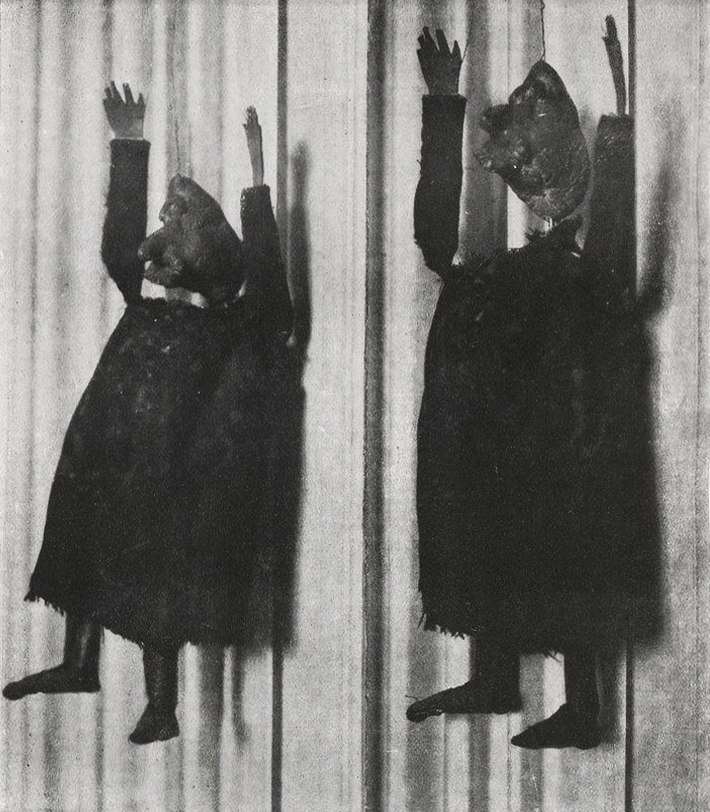
Alfred Jarry, Deux aspects de la marionnette original d'Ubu Roi, premiered at the Théâtre de l'Œuvre on 10 December 1896.

His father Anselme Jarry (1837–1895) was a salesman who descended into alcoholism; his mother Caroline, née Quernest (1842–1893), was interested in music and literature, but her family had a streak of insanity, and her mother and brother were institutionalized. The couple had two surviving children, a daughter Caroline-Marie, called Charlotte (1865–1925), and Alfred. In 1879 Caroline left Anselme and took the children to Saint-Brieuc in Brittany.

In 1888 the family moved to Rennes, where Jarry entered the lycée at 15. There he led a group of boys who enjoyed poking fun at their well-meaning but obese and incompetent physics teacher, a man named Hébert. Jarry and his classmate, Henri Morin, wrote a play they called Les Polonais and performed it with marionettes in the home of one of their friends. The main character, Père Heb, was a blunderer with a huge belly, three teeth (one of stone, one of iron and one of wood), a single, retractable ear and a misshapen body. In Jarry's later work Ubu Roi, Père Heb would develop into Ubu, one of the most monstrous and astonishing characters in French literature.

At 17 Jarry passed his baccalauréat and moved to Paris to prepare for admission to the École Normale Supérieure. Though he was not admitted, he soon gained attention for his original poems and prose-poems. A collection of his work, Les minutes de sable mémorial, was published in 1893.

That same year, Jarry contracted influenza. His mother and sister tended him, but once he recovered his mother fell ill of the disease and died; two years later his father perished from influenza as well, leaving Jarry a small inheritance which he quickly spent.

Jarry had meantime discovered the pleasures of alcohol, which he called "my sacred herb" or, when referring to absinthe, the "green goddess". A story is told that he once painted his face green and rode through town on his bicycle in its honour (and possibly under its influence).

When he was drafted into the army in 1894, his gift for turning notions upside down defeated attempts to instill military discipline. The sight of the diminutive Jarry in a uniform much too large for his less than 5-foot frame – the army did not issue uniforms small enough – was so disruptively funny that he was excused from parades and marching drills. Eventually the army discharged him for medical reasons. His military experience eventually inspired his novel Days and Nights.

In his youth, Jarry was homosexually inclined, although like many bohemians he disavowed sexual categorization. A brief but passionate relationship with future poet Léon-Paul Fargue inspired his semi-autobiographical play Haldernablou (1894).

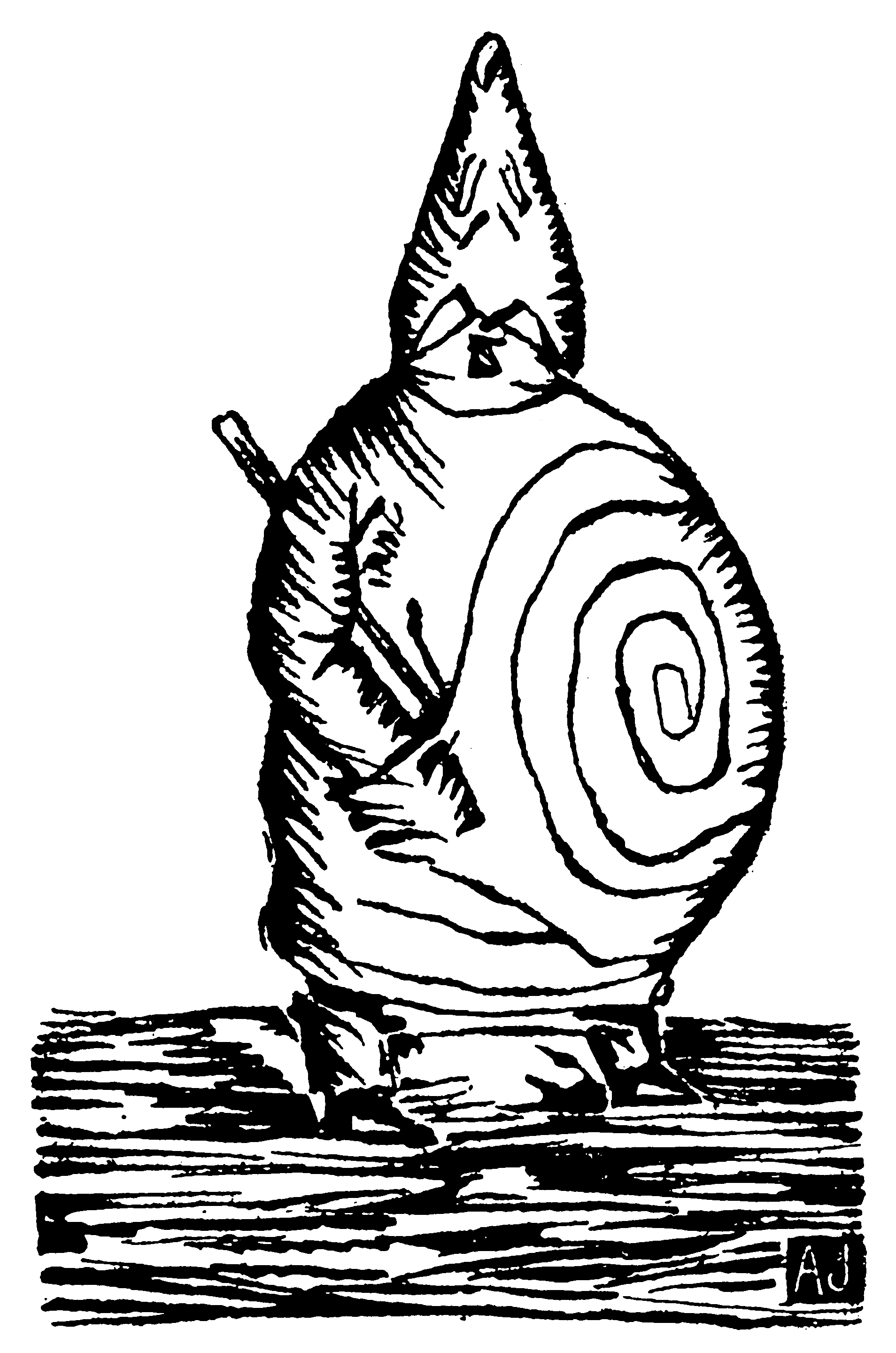
Père Ubu (later: Ubu Roi), from a woodcut by Alfred Jarry.

Jarry returned to Paris and applied himself to writing, drinking and the company of friends who appreciated his witty, sweet-tempered and unpredictable conversation. This period is marked by his intense involvement with Remy de Gourmont in the publication of L'Ymagier, a luxuriously produced "art" magazine devoted to the symbolic analysis of medieval and popular prints. Symbolism as an art movement was in full swing at this time, and L'Ymagier provided a nexus for many of its key contributors. Jarry's play Caesar Antichrist (1895) drew on this movement for material. This is a work that bridges the gap between serious symbolic meaning and the type of critical absurdity with which Jarry would soon become associated. Using the biblical Book of Revelation as a point of departure, Caesar Antichrist presents a parallel world of extreme formal symbolism in which Christ is resurrected not as an agent of spirituality but as an agent of the Roman Empire that seeks to dominate spirituality. It is a unique narrative that effectively links the domination of the soul to contemporaneous advances in the field of Egyptology such as the 1894 excavation of the Narmer Palette, an ancient artifact used for situating the rebus within hermeneutics. The character Ubu Roi first appears in this play.

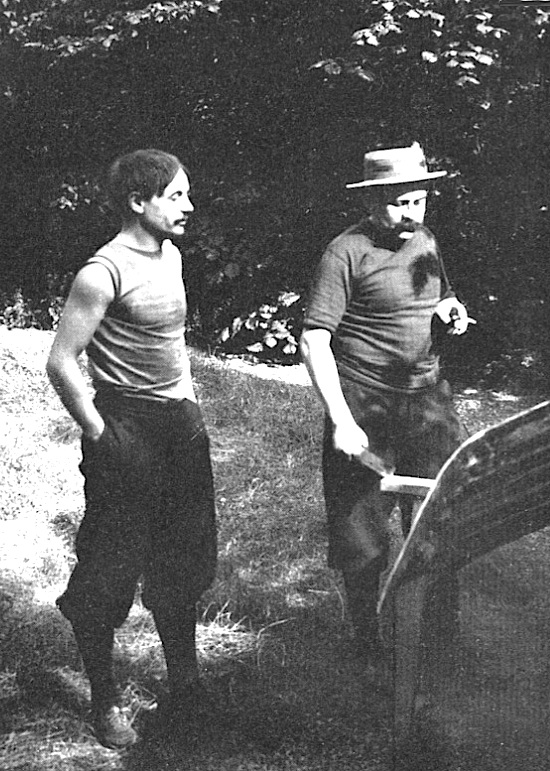
Jarry (left) and Alfred Vallette, editor of the literary magazine, Mercure de France. Vallette, in 1894, in his own home, hosted a presentation of Ubu Roi.

The spring of 1896 saw the publication, in Paul Fort's review Le Livre d'art, of Jarry's 5-act play Ubu Roi, the rewritten and expanded Les Polonais of his school days. Ubu Roi's savage humour and monstrous absurdity, unlike anything thus far performed in French theatre, seemed unlikely to ever actually be performed on stage. However, impetuous theatre director Aurélien-Marie Lugné-Poe took the risk, producing the play at his Théâtre de l'Œuvre.

On opening night (10 December 1896), with traditionalists and the avant-garde in the audience, King Ubu (played by Firmin Gémier) stepped forward and intoned the opening word, "Merdre!" (often translated as "Pshit" or "Shittr!" in English). A quarter of an hour of pandemonium ensued: outraged cries, booing, and whistling by the offended parties, countered by cheers and applause by the more bohemian contingent. Such interruptions continued through the evening. At the time, only the dress rehearsal and opening night performance were held, and the play was not revived until after Jarry's death.

The play brought fame to the 23-year-old Jarry, and he immersed himself in the fiction he had created. Gémier had modelled his portrayal of Ubu on Jarry's own staccato, nasal vocal delivery, which emphasized each syllable (even the silent ones). From then on, Jarry would always speak in this style. He adopted Ubu's ridiculous and pedantic figures of speech; for example, he referred to himself using the royal we, and called the wind "that which blows" and the bicycle he rode everywhere "that which rolls".

Jarry moved into a flat which the landlord had created through the unusual expedient of subdividing a larger flat by means of a horizontal rather than a vertical partition. The diminutive Jarry could just manage to stand up in the place, but guests had to bend or crouch. Jarry also took to carrying a loaded revolver. In response to a neighbour's complaint that his target shooting endangered her children, he replied, "If that should ever happen, ma-da-me, we should ourselves be happy to get new ones with you."

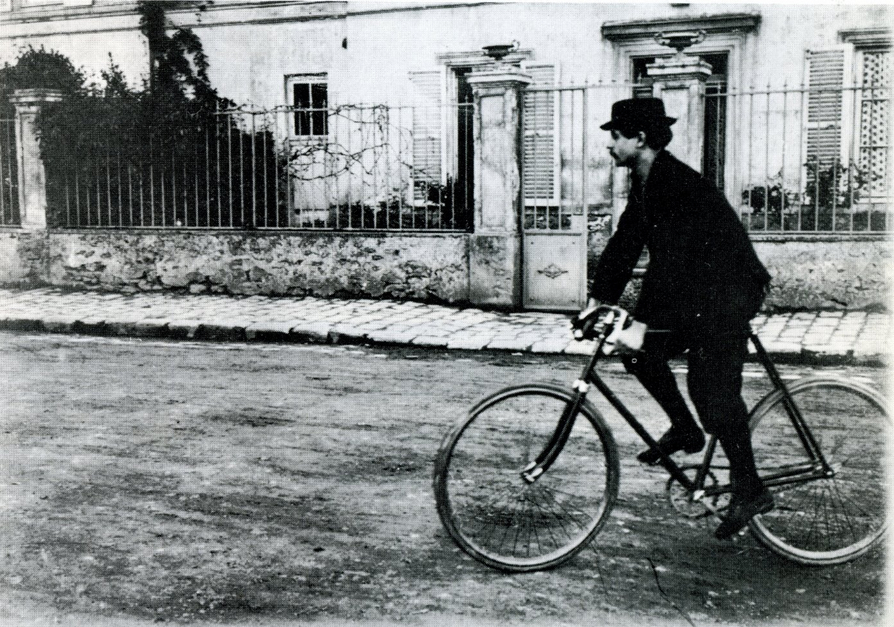
Jarry cycling in Corbeil in 1898.

With Franc-Nohain and Claude Terrasse he co-founded the Théâtre des Pantins, which in 1898 was the site of marionette performances of Ubu Roi.

Living in worsening poverty, neglecting his health and drinking excessively, Jarry went on to write the novel Le Surmâle (The Supermale), which is partly a satire on the Symbolist ideal of self-transcendence.

Alfred Jarry in 1906

Unpublished until after his death, his fiction Exploits and Opinions of Dr. Faustroll, Pataphysician (Gestes et opinions du docteur Faustroll, pataphysicien) describes the exploits and teachings of a sort of antiphilosopher who, born at age 63, travels through a hallucinatory Paris in a sieve and subscribes to the tenets of 'pataphysics. 'Pataphysics deals with "the laws which govern exceptions and will explain the universe supplementary to this one." In 'pataphysics, every event in the universe is accepted as an extraordinary event. In 1969, Paul McCartney used the word "pataphysical" in his song Maxwell's Silver Hammer.

In his final years, Jarry became the interest of multiple young writers and artists of Paris. Guillaume Apollinaire, André Salmon and Max Jacob sought him out in his truncated apartment. Pablo Picasso was also fascinated with Jarry. After Jarry's death Picasso acquired his revolver and wore it on his nocturnal expeditions in Paris. He later bought many of his manuscripts as well as executing a fine drawing of him.

Jarry died in Paris on 1 November 1907 of tuberculosis, aggravated by drug and alcohol abuse. When he could not afford alcohol, he drank ether. It is recorded that his last request was for a toothpick. He was interred in the Cimetière de Bagneux, near Paris.

The complete works of Alfred Jarry are published in three volumes by Gallimard in the collection Bibliothèque de la Pléiade.

== Selected works ==
=== Plays ===
- César-Antéchrist (1895) – (Caesar Antichrist) – which introduces Père Ubu and his symbolic meaning.
- Ubu Roi (1896, revised from 1888) – (Ubu Rex) – which portrays the ambition of Père Ubu.
- Ubu Cocu, ou l'Archeopteryx (1897) – (Ubu Cuckolded) – which portrays the inconstancy of Ubu's closest.
- Ubu Enchaíné (1899) – (Ubu in Chains) – which portrays Père Ubu in service.
- Ubu Sur La Butte (1906)

=== Novels ===
- Les Jours et Les Nuits, roman d'un déserteur (1897) – (Days and Nights, novel of a deserter). The first part of a fictional (or pataphysical) autobiography of life in the army.
- L'Amour en Visites (1897) – (Love in Visits). The second part of a fictional (or pataphysical) autobiography of life and the theatre.
- L'Amour Absolu (1899) – (Absolute Love). The third and final part of this autobiography.
- Messaline (1901) – (Messalina in English translation) – set in ancient Rome.
- Le Surmâle (1902) – (The Supermale) – features a superhuman bicycle race in which the hero is propelled by perpetual motion food (alcohol).
- Gestes et Opinions du Docteur Faustroll, Pataphysicien (Exploits and Opinions of Dr. Faustroll, Pataphysician) – published posthumously in 1911. This novel's symbolism defines the symbolic meaning of pataphysique.
- La Dragonne – assembled and published posthumously in 1943.

=== Other notable works ===
- Short story La Passion considérée comme course de côte (The Passion Considered as an Uphill Bicycle Race) has been widely circulated and imitated, notably by J. G. Ballard and Robert Anton Wilson.
- Comic operetta The Pope's Mustard-Maker (Le Moutardier du pape) First English translation (2019) by Doug Skinner.
- Speculative essays Speculations (Spéculations) English translation (2022) by R J Dent.
- Les Minutes de Sable Memorial (1894) – (Minutes of Memorial Sand) – a collection of short early works including the symbolist play Haldernablou.
- La Chandelle Verte: Lumières sur les Choses de ce Temps – (The Green Candle) – a collection of absurdist essays which revert his pataphysique the other way round. They address contemporary issues in an absurd manner. Originally published in reviews and collected in 1969.
- Illustrated Almanac of Père Ubu (1899).
- Illustrated Almanac of Père Ubu – 2nd edition (1901). Both the 1899 and 1901 almanacs are downloadable (in French) at http://alfredjarry.fr/jarry/
