= R. J. Dent =

R J Dent is an English writer of fiction and non-fiction.

== Work ==
His stories, poems and essays have appeared in publications including Writer’s Muse, Orbis, Chanticleer, Agenda, Panda, Roundyhouse, Quazen, Authspot, and Philosophy Now.

== Bibliography ==
=== Novels ===
- Myth (2006)

=== Short stories ===
- A Triumph (2002) Writer's Muse
- Jordy Michaels Leaps the Great Divide (2004) Philosophy Now
- More to the Picture (2006) Writer's Muse
- Chest of Wonders (2006) Express Art Gallery
- Mimique (2007) AWEN
- 9/11 Considered as the First Turn in a Game of Darts (2007) Authspot
- The Purple Butterfly (2008) Writer's Muse
- For Heart's Sake (2008) Authspot
- Yellow Bandana (2008) Authspot
- The Short Story (2008) Writinghood
- Tally (2008) Authspot
- Windows (2008) Authspot
- On The Bus (2008) Authspot
- The Six Letters of Henry VIII (2008) Authspot
- Echoes (2008) Authspot

=== Translations ===
- Alcaeus: Poems and Fragments (2012)
- Comte de Lautréamont: The Songs of Maldoror (2011)
- Charles Baudelaire: The Flowers of Evil (2009)

=== Essays ===
- A Collaboration of Unlike Minds: Robert Graves’ and William Blake’s The Tyger (2006) Roundyhouse
- You who magically make supple the old bones of the after-hours drunkard trampled by the horses’ – an essay on translating (2006) Agenda
- Violence and exquisite beauty – the aesthetics of Roy Campbell (2006) Agenda
- J. G. Ballard and the fiction of enclosed space (2007) Quazen
- The Life, Death and Afterlife of Richard Bachman(2007) Quazen

=== Poetry collections ===
- Moonstone Silhouettes

=== As contributor ===
- Sade: Sex and Death - Essays on the Marquis De Sade
- The Blood Delirium: The Vampire in 19th Century Literature
- 'Introduction: The Rolling Stones and Jeremy Reed' in Voodoo Excess: Rolling with the Stones by Jeremy Reed
